= 2011 Wolverhampton City Council election =

English local election

Elections to Wolverhampton City Council were held on 5 May 2011, the same day as the national referendum on the Alternative Vote, in Wolverhampton, England. One third of the council was up for election.

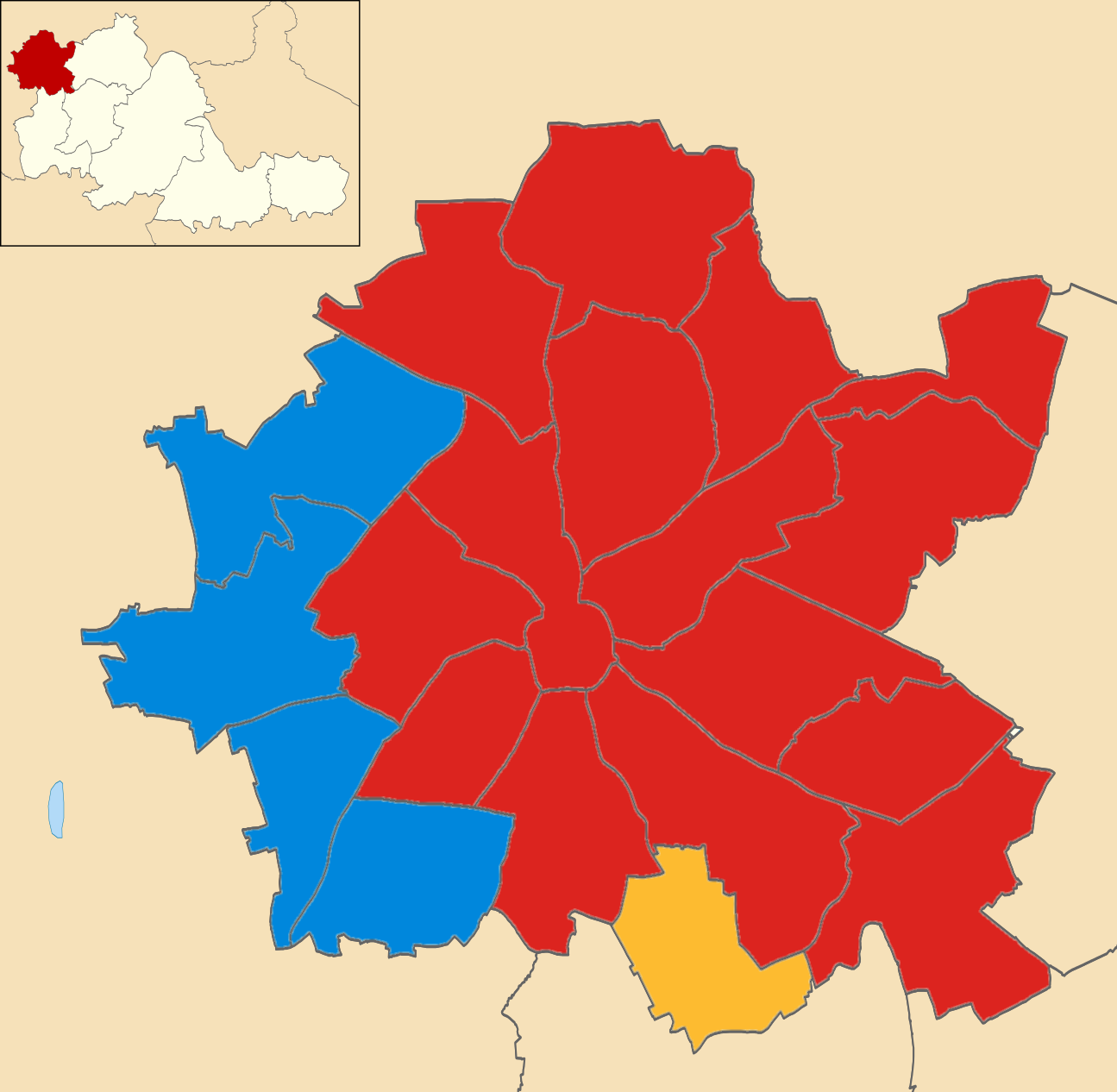
2011 local election results in Wolverhampton

== Composition ==
Prior to the election, the composition of the council was:

- Labour Party 31
- Conservative Party 25
- Liberal Democrat 4

Note: this differs from the total at the previous election, due to a by-election and a Liberal Democrat councillor defecting to Labour.

Following the election, the composition of the council is:

- Labour Party 35
- Conservative Party 22
- Liberal Democrat 3

== Election result ==
Wolverhampton local election result 2011
Party	Seats	Gains	Losses	Net gain/loss	Seats %	Votes %	Votes	+/−
Labour	35	4	0					
Conservative	22	0	3					
Liberal Democrats	3	0	1					
BNP	0	0	0		0			
Independent	0	0	0		0			
UKIP	0	0	0		0			

== Ward results ==
Bilston East
Party	Candidate	Votes	%	±%
Labour	Valerie Gibson	1,764	66.14	
Conservative	Tom Fellows	903	33.86	
Majority		861	32.28	
Turnout		2667	29.67	

Bilston North
Party	Candidate	Votes	%	±%
Labour	Sue Constable	1,696	59.82	
Conservative	David Hunt	625	22.05	
Liberal Democrats	Frances Heap	97	3.42	
BNP	Stewart Gardner	154	5.43	
UKIP	Remi Hodister	263	9.28	
Majority		1071	37.78	
Turnout		2,835	32.51	

Blakenhall
Party	Candidate	Votes	%	±%
Labour	Robert Jones	3,073		
Conservative	Sid Sidhu	678		
Majority		2,395	45.54%	
Turnout				

Bushbury North
Party	Candidate	Votes	%	±%
Conservative	Leslie Pugh	1,347		
Labour	Ian Angus	1,673		
BNP	Simon Patten	391		
Majority		326		
Turnout		3425	37.87%	

Bushbury South and Low Hill
Party	Candidate	Votes	%	±%
Labour	Peter O'Neill	1,763		
Conservative	Annette Pugh	625		
Majority		1,138		
Turnout		2,406	26.74%	

East Park
Party	Candidate	Votes	%	±%
Labour	Harman Banger	1,763		
Conservative	Darren Friel	1,508		
Majority		705		
Turnout		2,855	32.82%	

Ettingshall
Party	Candidate	Votes	%	±%
Labour	Sandra Samuels	Unopposed		−
Majority		-	-	−
Turnout		-	-	−

Fallings Park
Party	Candidate	Votes	%	±%
Labour	Valerie Evans	2,072		
Conservative	Simon Hewitt	1,123		
Majority		949		
Turnout		3,125	35.82%	

Graiseley
Party	Candidate	Votes	%	±%
Labour	Elias Mattu	2,399		
Conservative	Jazz Boparai	614		
Liberal Democrats	Eileen Birch	201		
Independent	John Mellor	505		
Majority		1,7585		
Turnout		3,746	45.44%	

Heath Town
Party	Candidate	Votes	%	±%
Labour	Milkinderpal Jaspal	1,488		
Conservative	John Lee	708		
Green	Matthew Addison	231		
Majority		1,785		
Turnout		2,448	31.85%	

Merry Hill
Party	Candidate	Votes	%	±%
Conservative	Christopher Haynes			
Labour	Nav Rana			
Liberal Democrats	Lexi Lawrence			
Independent	Timothy Broomer			
UKIP	Phil Templar			
Majority				
Turnout				

Oxley
Party	Candidate	Votes	%	±%
Conservative	Ian Bisbey	1,263		
Labour	Ian Claymore	1,749		
UKIP	Keith Sinclair	276		
Majority		513		
Turnout		3,285	37.12%	

Park
Party	Candidate	Votes	%	±%
Labour	Mike Hardacre	1,910		
Liberal Democrats	Jonathan Webber	568		
Conservative	Nasim Ullah	968		
Green	David Belcher	262		
Majority			942	
Turnout		3,730	46.73%	

Penn
Party	Candidate	Votes	%	±%
Conservative	Paul Singh			
Labour	Martin Waite			
Liberal Democrats	Bryan Lewis			
Green	Daniel Batchelor			
UKIP	Barry Hodgson			
Majority				
Turnout				

Spring Vale
Party	Candidate	Votes	%	±%
Liberal Democrats	Michael Heap			
Labour	Gurcharan Bedi			
Conservative	Trevor White			
BNP	David Bradnock			
Majority				
Turnout				

St Peter's
Party	Candidate	Votes	%	±%
Labour	Zahid Shah	1,867		
Liberal Democrats	Mary Garside	236		
Conservative	Shailesh Parekh	270		
Majority		1,597		
Turnout		2,391	35.07%	

Tettenhall Regis
Party	Candidate	Votes	%	±%
Conservative	Jonathan Yardley			
Labour	Muhammad Khan			
Liberal Democrats	Roger Gray			
UKIP	Donald Morris			
Majority				
Turnout				

Tettenhall Wightwick
Party	Candidate	Votes	%	±%
Conservative	Wendy Thompson			
Labour	Stu Goldcrusher			
Liberal Democrats	Peter Hollis			
Majority				
Turnout				

Wednesfield North
Party	Candidate	Votes	%	±%
Conservative	Tania Davis			
Labour	Rita Potter			
Majority				
Turnout				

Wednesfield South
Party	Candidate	Votes	%	±%
Conservative	Peter Dobb	1,074		
Labour	Bhupinder Gakhal	1,481		
Liberal Democrats	Oliver Williams	572		
Majority		407		
Turnout		3,1743	37.41%	
