= 2024 City of Wolverhampton Council election =

Local election in Wolverhampton, England

- 2 May 2024

20 out of 60 seats to City of Wolverhampton Council 31 seats needed for a majority

	Majority party	Minority party	Third party
Leader	Stephen Simkins	Wendy Thompson
Party	Labour	Conservative	Independent
Leader's seat	Bilston South	Tettenhall
Seats before	46	13	1
Seats won	16	4	0
Seats after	47	12	1
Seat change	▲1	▼1	Steady
- Map depicting the winners of each ward. Red shows a Labour win. Blue shows a Conservative win.
Leader before election
Stephen Simkins
Labour
Leader after election
Stephen Simkins
Labour

The 2024 City of Wolverhampton Council election was held on Thursday 2 May 2024, alongside the other local elections in the United Kingdom being held on the same day. One-third of the 60 members of City of Wolverhampton Council in the West Midlands were elected.

== Background ==
Wolverhampton is a strong Labour council. The party have controlled the council for most of its history, only failing to win a majority in 1987, 1992, 2008, and 2010. The 2023 election was for the entire council on new ward boundaries. In that election, Labour won 47 seats with 57.2% of the vote, and the Conservatives won 13 with 37.0%.

The 2024 election was for seats held by councillors who were elected with the fewest votes. Labour defended 15 seats and the Conservatives defended 5.

== Previous council composition ==
After 2023 election		Before 2024 election		After 2024 election	
Party	Seats	Party	Seats	Party	Seats
Labour	47	Labour	46	Labour	47
Conservative	13	Conservative	13	Conservative	12
Independent	0	Independent	1	Independent	1

Changes 2023–2024:

- June 2023: Celia Hibbert suspended from Labour
- July 2023: Ian Brookfield (Labour) dies; by-election held September 2023
- September 2023: Paul Brookfield (Labour) wins by-election

== Election result ==
Labour increased their majority on the council, gaining a seat from the Conservatives.

2024 City of Wolverhampton Council election
Party	This election			Full council			This election		
Party	Seats	Net	Seats %	Other	Total	Total %	Votes	Votes %	+/−
Labour	16	▲1	85.0	31	47	78.3	30,355	56.1	–1.1
Conservative	4	▼1	15.0	8	12	20.0	17,667	32.7	–4.3
Independent	0	Steady	0.0	1	1	1.7	652	1.2	+1.1
Green	0	Steady	0.0	0	0	0.0	3,286	6.1	+4.0
Liberal Democrats	0	Steady	0.0	0	0	0.0	1,949	3.6	+0.3
Party of Women	0	Steady	0.0	0	0	0.0	161	0.3	N/A

== Ward results ==
An asterisk denotes an incumbent councillor seeking re-election.

=== Bilston North ===
Bilston North
Party	Candidate	Votes	%	±%
Labour Co-op	Leigh New	1,763	71.29	+16.86
Conservative	Audrey Okere	710	28.71	+1.18
Majority		1,053	42.58	
Turnout		2,473	26.47	
Labour Co-op hold		Swing		

=== Bilston South ===
Bilston South
Party	Candidate	Votes	%	±%
Labour	Rashpal Kaur*	1,549	70.09	+9.54
Conservative	Lewis Wastell	661	29.91	+9.09
Majority		888	40.18	
Turnout		2,210	21.90	
Labour hold		Swing		

=== Blakenhall ===
Blakenhall
Party	Candidate	Votes	%	±%
Labour Co-op	Sally Green*	2,244	75.07	+11.15
Conservative	Adam Ansari	453	15.16	−4.22
Green	Stephen Petter	126	4.22	New
Liberal Democrats	Patrick Bentley	86	2.88	−6.81
Independent	Tracy Cooper	80	2.67	New
Majority		1,791	59.91	
Turnout		2,989	34.52	
Labour Co-op hold		Swing		

=== Bushbury North ===
Bushbury North
Party	Candidate	Votes	%	±%
Conservative	Simon Bennett*	1,321	47.03	+2.23
Labour	Gary Edwards	1,271	45.25	+3.17
Liberal Democrats	Gary Peck	217	7.72	−2.21
Majority		50	1.78	
Turnout		2,809	29.38	
Conservative hold		Swing		

=== Bushbury South and Low Hill ===
Bushbury South and Low Hill
Party	Candidate	Votes	%	±%
Labour	Paul Sweet*	1,323	70.45	+10.35
Conservative	Rob Williams	403	21.46	−1.20
Liberal Democrats	Ann Jenkins	152	8.09	−4.69
Majority		920	48.99	
Turnout		1,878	19.85	
Labour hold		Swing		

=== East Park ===
East Park
Party	Candidate	Votes	%	±%
Labour	Stephen Russell	1,433	63.04	+2.95
Conservative	Joe Stepien	379	23.00	+5.41
Independent	Steve Hall	294	13.96	+6.52
Majority		1,054	40.04	
Turnout		2,106	23.19	
Labour hold		Swing		

=== Ettingshall North ===
Ettingshall North
Party	Candidate	Votes	%	±%
Labour Co-op	Zee Russell*	2,224	81.98	+18.52
Conservative	Amar Bhandal	489	18.02	−1.58
Majority		1,735	63.96	
Turnout		2,713	28.20	
Labour Co-op hold		Swing		

=== Ettingshall South and Spring Vale ===
Ettingshall South and Spring Vale
Party	Candidate	Votes	%	±%
Labour Co-op	Harbinder Singh*	1,988	71.82	+22.87
Conservative	Sian Kumar	780	28.18	−5.70
Majority		1,208	43.64	
Turnout		2,768	29.46	
Labour Co-op hold		Swing		

=== Fallings Park ===
Fallings Park
Party	Candidate	Votes	%	±%
Labour	Valerie Evans*	1,299	56.75	+4.32
Conservative	Julia Dickens	716	31.28	−6.18
Party of Women	Charlotte Hawkins	161	7.03	New
Liberal Democrats	Peter Nixon	113	4.94	−4.89
Majority		583	25.47	
Turnout		2,289	25.64	
Labour hold		Swing		

=== Graiseley ===
Graiseley
Party	Candidate	Votes	%	±%
Labour Co-op	Jacqueline Sweetman*	1,724	59.31	−0.67
Conservative	Tony Gething	566	19.47	−4.64
Independent	Zahid Shah	278	9.56	New
Green	Amy Bertaut	240	8.26	−9.05
Liberal Democrats	Jessica Pringle	99	3.40	New
Majority		1,158	39.84	
Turnout		2,907	33.28	
Labour Co-op hold		Swing		

=== Heath Town ===
Heath Town
Party	Candidate	Votes	%	±%
Labour	Jaspreet Jaspal*	1,305	64.35	+10.56
Conservative	Joe Banla	432	21.30	+0.23
Green	Kwaku Tano-Yeboah	193	9.52	−9.89
Liberal Democrats	Vikas Chopra	98	4.83	New
Majority		873	43.05	
Turnout		2,028	23.55	
Labour hold		Swing		

=== Merry Hill ===
Merry Hill
Party	Candidate	Votes	%	±%
Labour	Ben Evans	1,540	47.65	+6.50
Conservative	Chris Haynes*	1,459	45.14	+0.84
Green	Jennifer Hibell	233	7.21	−9.47
Majority		81	2.51	
Turnout		3,232	35.66	
Labour gain from Conservative		Swing		

=== Oxley ===
Oxley
Party	Candidate	Votes	%	±%
Labour Co-op	Barbara McGarrity*	1,444	50.10	+1.85
Conservative	Adam Collinge	1,032	35.81	−2.82
Green	Mia Clark	266	9.23	New
Liberal Democrats	Ian Jenkins	140	4.86	−4.57
Majority		412	14.29	
Turnout		2,882	27.85	
Labour Co-op hold		Swing		

=== Park ===
Park
Party	Candidate	Votes	%	±%
Labour	Muhammad Nasim	1,668	52.97	−4.73
Conservative	Surrinder Ram	697	22.13	−4.77
Green	Paul Darke	491	15.59	New
Liberal Democrats	Bryan Lewis	293	9.31	−0.06
Majority		971	30.84	
Turnout		3,149	32.98	
Labour hold		Swing		

=== Penn ===
Penn
Party	Candidate	Votes	%	±%
Conservative	Paul Singh*	1,733	45.26	+2.74
Labour Co-op	Kashmire Hawker	1,656	43.25	+1.95
Green	Ayden Young	330	8.62	New
Liberal Democrats	Anna Khan	110	2.87	−7.65
Majority		77	2.01	
Turnout		3,829	39.45	
Conservative hold		Swing		

=== St Peters ===
St Peters
Party	Candidate	Votes	%	±%
Labour	Iqra Tahir*	1,249	51.40	−9.41
Green	Mohammed Naseem	599	24.65	New
Liberal Democrats	David Murray	300	12.35	−9.49
Conservative	Gillian Timms	282	11.60	−4.54
Majority		650	26.75	
Turnout		2,430	27.51	
Labour hold		Swing		

=== Tettenhall Regis ===
Tettenhall Regis
Party	Candidate	Votes	%	±%
Conservative	Udey Singh*	1,663	51.89	+3.17
Labour	Robert Siarkiewicz	1,051	32.79	−2.99
Liberal Democrats	Julian Donald	251	7.83	−1.29
Green	Don Gwinnett	240	7.49	New
Majority		612	19.10	
Turnout		3,205	35.00	
Conservative hold		Swing		

=== Tettenhall Wightwick ===
Tettenhall Wightwick
Party	Candidate	Votes	%	±%
Conservative	Sally Garner	2,228	63.03	+3.75
Labour	Bahadur Dehar	950	26.87	−2.74
Green	Andrea Cantrill	267	7.55	−6.02
Liberal Democrats	Arfan Khan	90	2.55	New
Majority		1,278	36.16	
Turnout		3,535	39.69	
Conservative hold		Swing		

=== Wednesfield North ===
Wednesfield North
Party	Candidate	Votes	%	±%
Labour	Mary Bateman*	1,431	66.10	+12.52
Conservative	Nathaniel Williams	754	33.90	−2.41
Majority		677	32.20	
Turnout		2,165	26.35	
Labour hold		Swing		

=== Wednesfield South ===
Wednesfield South
Party	Candidate	Votes	%	±%
Labour	Jacqui Coogan*	1,243	50.57	+0.08
Conservative	Pete Dickens	914	37.18	+1.05
Green	Hardev Singh	301	12.25	New
Majority		329	13.39	
Turnout		2,458	27.77	
Labour hold		Swing		

== Changes 2024-2026 ==
=== By-elections ===
==== Bilston North ====
Bilston North by-election: 31 October 2024
Party	Candidate	Votes	%	±%
Reform	Anita Stanley	652	34.8	N/A
Labour	Luke Guy	471	25.1	–46.2
Green	Hardev Singh	438	23.4	N/A
Conservative	Andrew Randle	257	13.7	–15.0
Liberal Democrats	Julian Donald	55	2.9	N/A
Majority		181	9.7	N/A
Turnout		1,873	19.2	–7.3
Registered electors		9,805		
Reform gain from Labour				
