= 2007 Wolverhampton City Council election =

2007 UK local government election

Map of the results of the 2007 Wolverhampton council election. Labour in red, Conservatives in blue and Liberal Democrats in yellow.

Elections to Wolverhampton City Council were held on 3 May 2007 in Wolverhampton, England. One third of the council was up for election and the Labour Party kept overall control of the council.

== Composition ==
Prior to the election, the composition of the council was:

- Labour Party 40
- Conservative Party 15
- Liberal Democrat 2
- Liberal 1
- Independent 2

After the election, the composition of the council was:

- Labour Party 36
- Conservative Party 19
- Liberal Democrat 3
- Liberal 1
- Independent 1

== Election result ==
Wolverhampton local election result 2007
Party	Seats	Gains	Losses	Net gain/loss	Seats %	Votes %	Votes	+/−
Labour	36	0	4	-4	60	38.32	24544	
Conservative	19	4	0	+4	31.67	37.58	24070	
Liberal Democrats	3	1	0	+1	5	14.39	9216	
Liberal	1	0	0	0	1.67	0.87	559	
BNP	0	0	0	0	0	4.87	3122	
Independent	1	0	1	-1	1.67	2.82	1808	
Green	0	0	0	0	0	0.92	592	

== Ward results ==
Bilston East
Party	Candidate	Votes	%	±%
Labour	Louise Miles	1304	46.73	
Conservative	Ann Modi	709	25.41	
Independent	Tom Fellows	558	20.00	
Liberal Democrats	Adam Birch	208	7.45	
Majority		595	21.33	
Turnout		2,790	29.70	
Labour hold		Swing		

Bilston North
Party	Candidate	Votes	%	±%
Labour	Sue Constable	1260	45.00	
Conservative	Gill Fellows	1051	37.54	
Liberal Democrats	Paul Mehmi	243	8.68	
Green	Eddie Clarke	231	8.25	
Majority		209	7.46	
Turnout		2,800	31.37	
Labour hold		Swing		

Blakenhall
Party	Candidate	Votes	%	±%
Labour	Robert Jones	2137	63.30	
Conservative	Sid Sidhu	980	29.03	
Liberal Democrats	Frances Heap	240	7.10	
Majority		1157	34.27	
Turnout		3,376	39.44	
Labour hold		Swing		

Bushbury North
Party	Candidate	Votes	%	±%
Conservative	Leslie Pugh	1312	37.25	
Labour	Michael Hardacre	944	26.80	
BNP	Simon Patten	790	22.43	
Liberal Democrats	James Lindly	466	13.23	
Majority		368	10.45	
Turnout		3,522	38.68	
Conservative hold		Swing		

Bushbury South and Low Hill
Party	Candidate	Votes	%	±%
Labour	Peter O'Neill	1186	55.73	
Conservative	Jennifer Brewer	493	23.17	
BNP	Sandra Newman	236	11.09	
Liberal Democrats	Ian Jenkins	207	9.72	
Majority		693	32.56	
Turnout		2,128	23.31	
Labour hold		Swing		

East Park
Party	Candidate	Votes	%	±%
Labour	Francis Docherty	1182	46.17	
Conservative	Peter Dobb	531	20.74	
Liberal Democrats	Darren Friel	436	17.03	
Independent	Stephen Hall	402	15.70	
Majority		651	25.43	
Turnout		2,560	28.76	
Labour hold		Swing		

Ettingshall
Party	Candidate	Votes	%	±%
Labour	Alan Smith	1923	66.77	
Conservative	John Corns	564	19.58	
Liberal Democrats	Eileen Birch	378	13.12	
Majority		1359	47.19	
Turnout		2,880	30.51	
Labour hold		Swing		

Fallings Park
Party	Candidate	Votes	%	±%
Labour	Valerie Evans	1386	42.82	
Conservative	Hazel Keirle	1008	31.14	
BNP	Dennis Organ	577	17.83	
Liberal Democrats	Stephen Birch	263	8.12	
Majority		378	11.68	
Turnout		3,237	35.97	
Labour hold		Swing		

Graiseley
Party	Candidate	Votes	%	±%
Labour	Elias Mattu	2082	56.41	
Conservative	Matthew Revell	1184	32.08	
Liberal Democrats	Bryan Lewis	405	10.97	
Majority		898	24.33	
Turnout		3,691	41.38	
Labour hold		Swing		

Heath Town
Party	Candidate	Votes	%	±%
Labour	Leslie Turner	921	43.06	
Liberal	Colin Hallmark	559	26.13	
Conservative	Lucie Turner	514	24.03	
Independent	David Jack	135	6.31	
Majority		362	16.92	
Turnout		2,139	28.25	
Labour hold		Swing		

Merry Hill
Party	Candidate	Votes	%	±%
Conservative	Christopher Haynes	2236	62.32	
Labour	Muhammad Yaseen	797	22.21	
Liberal Democrats	Edward Pringle	539	15.02	
Majority		1439	40.11	
Turnout		3,588	38.16	
Conservative hold		Swing		

Oxley
Party	Candidate	Votes	%	±%
Conservative	Ian Bisbey	1458	49.00	
Labour	Ian Brookfield	1249	41.97	
Liberal Democrats	John Steatham	258	8.66	
Majority		209	7.02	
Turnout		2,976	32.67	
Conservative gain from Labour		Swing	9.4	

Park
Party	Candidate	Votes	%	±%
Liberal Democrats	Robin Lawrence	1340	35.11	
Labour	Sandra Samuels	1204	31.55	
Conservative	Carl Husted	946	24.80	
Green	Stuart Hinde	196	5.14	
Independent	Claire Darke	110	2.88	
Majority		136	3.56	
Turnout		3,816	44.57	
Liberal Democrats gain from Labour		Swing		

Penn
Party	Candidate	Votes	%	±%
Conservative	Parambir Singh	2026	46.93	
Labour	Ricky Chima	1304	30.21	
Liberal Democrats	June Hemsley	968	22.42	
Majority		722	16.72	
Turnout		4,317	43.44	
Conservative gain from Independent		Swing		

Spring Vale
Party	Candidate	Votes	%	±%
Liberal Democrats	Michael Heap	1884	59.25	
Labour	William Langford	826	25.97	
Conservative	Brian Fellows	371	11.67	
Independent	Nichola Jack	90	2.83	
Majority		1058	33.27	
Turnout		3,180	36.17	
Liberal Democrats hold		Swing		

St Peter's
Party	Candidate	Votes	%	±%
Labour	Surjan Duhra	1156	56.03	
Liberal Democrats	Alexandra Lawrence	403	19.53	
Conservative	Didar Singh	334	16.19	
Green	Malcolm Verrall	165	7.99	
Majority		753	36.50	
Turnout		2,063	28.03	
Labour hold		Swing		

Tettenhall Regis
Party	Candidate	Votes	%	±%
Conservative	Jonathon Yardley	2695	70.70	
Labour	Julie Hodgkiss	693	18.18	
Liberal Democrats	Colin Ross	412	10.80	
Majority		2002	52.52	
Turnout		3,812	41.45	
Conservative hold		Swing		

Tettenhall Wightwick
Party	Candidate	Votes	%	±%
Conservative	Wendy Thompson	2942	70.15	
Labour	Malcolm Freeman	640	15.26	
Liberal Democrats	Roger Gray	356	8.49	
BNP	Phillip Bland	248	5.91	
Majority		2302	54.89	
Turnout		4,194	45.86	
Conservative hold		Swing		

Wednesfield North
Party	Candidate	Votes	%	±%
Conservative	Charlotte Quarmby	1327	35.58	
Labour	Dave Jones	1140	30.56	
BNP	Arthur Newman	844	22.63	
Independent	Irene Dodd	513	13.75	
Majority		187	5.01	
Turnout		3,370	41.30	
Conservative gain from Labour		Swing		

Wednesfield South
Party	Candidate	Votes	%	±%
Conservative	Carol Bourne	1389	42.82	
Labour	Helen King	1210	37.30	
BNP	Steven Haddon	427	13.16	
Liberal Democrats	Carole Jenkins	210	6.47	
Majority		179	5.52	
Turnout		3,244	37.31	
Conservative gain from Labour		Swing		

== Number of candidates ==
Of the main political parties, both the Conservative Party and Labour Party fielded a full slate of 20 candidates each.

The Liberal Democrats fielded 18 candidates, failing to have a candidate in place in both Wednesfield North and Heath Town wards.

One independent candidate stood in each of the following 6 wards:

- Bilston East
- East Park
- Heath Town
- Park
- Spring Vale
- Wednesfield North

The British National Party fielded 6 candidates, one candidate in each of the following wards:

- Bushbury North
- Bushbury South & Low Hill
- Fallings Park
- Tettenhall Wightwick
- Wednesfield North
- Wednesfield South

The Green Party had a candidate in each of the following 3 wards:

- Bilston North
- Park
- St Peter's

The Liberal Party stood in only one ward, Heath Town.
