= 2008 Wolverhampton City Council election =

2008 UK local government election

Map of the results of the 2008 Wolverhampton council election. Labour in red, Conservatives in blue and Liberal Democrats in yellow.

Elections to Wolverhampton City Council were held on 1 May 2008 in Wolverhampton, England. One third of the council was up for election and the Labour group lost overall control after losing eight seats across the City.

Turnout across the City was 34.6%, with variations in turnout ranging from 22.1% in the Bushbury South & Low Hill ward up to 45.4% in Tettenhall Wightwick.

Following the election, an alliance between the Conservative and Liberal Democrat groups was formed, ending 14 years of Labour Party rule.

== Composition ==
Due to the only Liberal Councillor officially joining the Liberal Democrats, the Liberal Democrats had increased their number of Councillors in 2007 from 3 to 4.

Prior to the election, the composition of the council was:

- Labour Party 36
- Conservative Party 19
- Liberal Democrat 4
- Independent 1

Following the election, the composition of the council is:

- Labour Party 28
- Conservative Party 27
- Liberal Democrat 5

== Election result ==
Wolverhampton local election result 2008
| Party | Seats | Gains | Losses | Net gain/loss | Seats % | Votes % | Votes | +/− |
|---|---|---|---|---|---|---|---|---|
| Labour | 28 | 0 | -8 | -8 | 46 | 34.4 | 21300 | -3244 |
| Conservative | 27 | 8 | 0 | +8 | 45 | 48.2 | 29833 | +5763 |
| Liberal Democrats | 5 | 1 | 0 | +1 | 8 | 15.6 | 9630 | +482 |
| BNP | 0 | 0 | 0 | 0 | 0 | 1.1 | 1158 | -1964 |
| Green | 0 | 0 | 0 | 0 | 0 | 0.5 | 340 | -252 |
| Equal Parenting Alliance | 0 | 0 | 0 | 0 | 0 | 0.2 | 101 | +101 |
| Independent | 0 | 0 | -1 | -1 | 0 | 0 | 0 | -1808 |

== Ward results ==
Bilston East
| Party | Candidate | Votes | % | ±% |
|---|---|---|---|---|
| Labour | Thomas Turner | 1168 | 47.2 | +0.2 |
| Conservative | Nick Thompson | 969 | 39.1 | +13.6 |
| Liberal Democrats | Geoffrey Cockayne | 339 | 13.7 | +6.2 |
| Majority | | 199 | 7.98 | |
| Turnout | | 2476 | 26.2 | −3.2 |
| Labour hold | | Swing | 6.7 | |

Bilston North
| Party | Candidate | Votes | % | ±% |
|---|---|---|---|---|
| Conservative | Gillian Fellows | 1272 | 44.6 | +6.9 |
| Labour | Trudy Bowen | 1180 | 41.4 | −3.8 |
| Liberal Democrats | Alexandra Lawrence | 209 | 7.3 | −1.4 |
| Green | Edward Clarke | 189 | 6.6 | −1.7 |
| Majority | | 92 | 3.21 | |
| Turnout | | 2850 | 31.8 | +0.8 |
| Conservative gain from Labour | | Swing | 5.4 | |

Blakenhall
| Party | Candidate | Votes | % | ±% |
|---|---|---|---|---|
| Labour | John Rowley | 1855 | 56.7 | −6.9 |
| Conservative | Avtar Sidhu | 1218 | 37.2 | +8.0 |
| Liberal Democrats | Frances Heap | 198 | 6.1 | −1.1 |
| Majority | | 637 | 19.5 | |
| Turnout | | 3271 | 37.9 | −1.2 |
| Labour hold | | Swing | 7.5 | |

Bushbury North
| Party | Candidate | Votes | % | ±% |
|---|---|---|---|---|
| Conservative | Carl Husted | 1723 | 47.9 | +9.9 |
| Labour | Paula Brookfield | 1024 | 28.5 | +1.1 |
| BNP | Simon Patten | 580 | 16.1 | −6.8 |
| Liberal Democrats | Susan Bem | 269 | 7.5 | −4.3 |
| Majority | | 699 | 19.4 | |
| Turnout | | 3596 | 39.0 | +1.4 |
| Conservative gain from Labour | | Swing | 4.4 | |

Bushbury South and Low Hill
| Party | Candidate | Votes | % | ±% |
|---|---|---|---|---|
| Labour | Peter Bilson | 982 | 48.0 | −7.8 |
| Conservative | Annette Pugh | 751 | 36.7 | +13.5 |
| Liberal Democrats | Ian Jenkins | 311 | 15.2 | +5.5 |
| Majority | | 231 | 11.3 | |
| Turnout | | 2044 | 22.1 | −1.0 |
| Labour hold | | Swing | 10.7 | |

East Park
| Party | Candidate | Votes | % | ±% |
|---|---|---|---|---|
| Conservative | Stephen Hall | 1309 | 46.6 | +25.7 |
| Labour | Patricia Byrne | 975 | 34.7 | −11.7 |
| Liberal Democrats | Darren Friel | 528 | 18.8 | +1.7 |
| Majority | | 334 | 11.9 | |
| Turnout | | 2812 | 31.5 | +3.0 |
| Conservative gain from Labour | | Swing | 18.7 | |

Ettingshall
| Party | Candidate | Votes | % | ±% |
|---|---|---|---|---|
| Labour | Bishan Dass | 1546 | 58.5 | −8.6 |
| Conservative | Ranjit Kaur | 648 | 24.5 | +4.8 |
| Liberal Democrats | Roger Gray | 448 | 17.0 | +3.8 |
| Majority | | 898 | 34.0 | |
| Turnout | | 2642 | 28.2 | −2.0 |
| Labour hold | | Swing | 6.7 | |

Fallings Park
| Party | Candidate | Votes | % | ±% |
|---|---|---|---|---|
| Conservative | James Wilson | 1536 | 49.7 | +18.5 |
| Labour | Geoffrey Foster | 1239 | 40.1 | −2.8 |
| Liberal Democrats | Stephen Birch | 316 | 10.2 | +2.1 |
| Majority | | 297 | 9.6 | |
| Turnout | | 3091 | 34.0 | −1.6 |
| Conservative gain from Labour | | Swing | 10.6 | |

Graiseley
| Party | Candidate | Votes | % | ±% |
|---|---|---|---|---|
| Labour | John Reynolds | 1603 | 49.5 | −7.2 |
| Conservative | Paul Armstrong | 1227 | 37.9 | +5.6 |
| Liberal Democrats | Bryan Lewis | 409 | 12.6 | +1.6 |
| Majority | | 376 | 11.6 | |
| Turnout | | 3239 | 36.5 | |
| Labour hold | | Swing | 6.4 | |

Heath Town
| Party | Candidate | Votes | % | ±% |
|---|---|---|---|---|
| Conservative | Margaret Findlay | 1063 | 54.1 | +29.9 |
| Labour | Milkinderpal Jaspal | 903 | 45.9 | +2.7 |
| Majority | | 160 | 8.1 | |
| Turnout | | 1966 | 25.7 | −2.2 |
| Conservative gain from Labour | | Swing | 13.6 | |

Merry Hill
| Party | Candidate | Votes | % | ±% |
|---|---|---|---|---|
| Conservative | John Pask | 2391 | 67.7 | +4.9 |
| Labour | Navjit Rana | 677 | 19.2 | −3.2 |
| Liberal Democrats | Edward Pringle | 466 | 13.2 | −1.7 |
| Majority | | 1714 | 48.5 | |
| Turnout | | 3534 | 37.5 | 0.0 |
| Conservative gain from Independent | | Swing | 4.1 | |

Oxley
| Party | Candidate | Votes | % | ±% |
|---|---|---|---|---|
| Conservative | Jennifer Brewer | 1591 | 51.1 | +1.9 |
| Labour | Christine Irvine | 1277 | 41.0 | −1.1 |
| Liberal Democrats | John Steatham | 247 | 7.9 | −0.8 |
| Majority | | 314 | 10.1 | |
| Turnout | | 3115 | 34.0 | +1.7 |
| Conservative gain from Labour | | Swing | 1.5 | |

Park
| Party | Candidate | Votes | % | ±% |
|---|---|---|---|---|
| Liberal Democrats | Claire Darke | 1490 | 42.0 | +6.7 |
| Labour | Jennifer Cromie | 1117 | 31.5 | −0.2 |
| Conservative | Arun Photay | 940 | 26.5 | +1.6 |
| Majority | | 373 | 10.5 | |
| Turnout | | 3547 | 41.7 | −2.4 |
| Liberal Democrats gain from Labour | | Swing | | |

Penn
| Party | Candidate | Votes | % | ±% |
|---|---|---|---|---|
| Conservative | Patricia Bradley | 2731 | 66.1 | +19.0 |
| Labour | Ricky Chima | 946 | 22.9 | −7.4 |
| Liberal Democrats | June Hemsley | 452 | 10.9 | −11.6 |
| Majority | | 1785 | 43.2 | |
| Turnout | | 4129 | 41.2 | −1.8 |
| Conservative hold | | Swing | 13.2 | |

Spring Vale
| Party | Candidate | Votes | % | ±% |
|---|---|---|---|---|
| Liberal Democrats | Richard Whitehouse | 1987 | 64.3 | +4.9 |
| Labour | Mangoo Mal | 583 | 18.9 | −7.2 |
| Conservative | Peter Dobb | 519 | 16.8 | +5.1 |
| Majority | | 1404 | 45.5 | |
| Turnout | | 3089 | 34.8 | +1.0 |
| Liberal Democrats hold | | Swing | | |

St Peter's
| Party | Candidate | Votes | % | ±% |
|---|---|---|---|---|
| Labour | Roger Lawrence | 964 | 44.7 | −11.5 |
| Liberal Democrats | Zahid Shah | 811 | 37.6 | +18.0 |
| Conservative | Catherine Bisbey | 381 | 17.7 | +1.4 |
| Majority | | 153 | 7.1 | |
| Turnout | | 2156 | 29.9 | +2.0 |
| Labour hold | | Swing | | |

Tettenhall Regis
| Party | Candidate | Votes | % | ±% |
|---|---|---|---|---|
| Conservative | John Davis | 2822 | 73.9 | +3.0 |
| Labour | Julie Hodgkiss | 643 | 16.8 | −1.4 |
| Liberal Democrats | Richard Fellows | 352 | 9.2 | −1.6 |
| Majority | | 2179 | 57.1 | |
| Turnout | | 3817 | 41.3 | +0.2 |
| Conservative hold | | Swing | 2.2% | |

Tettenhall Wightwick
| Party | Candidate | Votes | % | ±% |
|---|---|---|---|---|
| Conservative | Joan Stevenson | 3149 | 76.0 | +5.7 |
| Labour | Jagnandan Ghera | 491 | 11.9 | −3.4 |
| Liberal Democrats | Sarah Sinclair | 401 | 9.7 | +1.2 |
| Equal Parenting Alliance | Raymond Barry | 101 | 2.4 | |
| Majority | | 2658 | 64.2 | |
| Turnout | | 4142 | 45.4 | −0.1 |
| Conservative hold | | Swing | 5.8 | |

Wednesfield North
| Party | Candidate | Votes | % | ±% |
|---|---|---|---|---|
| Conservative | Hazel Keirle | 1699 | 45.2 | +10.5 |
| Labour | Philip Bateman | 1296 | 34.5 | +4.7 |
| BNP | Dennis Organ | 578 | 15.4 | −6.7 |
| Liberal Democrats | Colin Ross | 186 | 4.9 | +4.9 |
| Majority | | 403 | 10.7 | |
| Turnout | | 3759 | 41.5 | +0.5 |
| Conservative gain from Labour | | Swing | 2.9 | |

Wednesfield South
| Party | Candidate | Votes | % | ±% |
|---|---|---|---|---|
| Conservative | Simon Jevon | 1894 | 61.4 | +18.4 |
| Labour | Helen King | 831 | 26.9 | −10.5 |
| Liberal Democrats | Carole Jenkins | 211 | 6.8 | +0.3 |
| Green | Stuart Hinde | 151 | 4.9 | +4.9 |
| Majority | | 1063 | 34.4 | |
| Turnout | | 3087 | 35.5 | −1.4 |
| Conservative hold | | Swing | 14.5 | |
