= 2010 Wolverhampton City Council election =

2010 UK local government election

Map of the results of the 2010 Wolverhampton council election. Labour in red, Conservatives in blue and Liberal Democrats in yellow.

Elections to Wolverhampton City Council were held on 6 May 2010 in Wolverhampton, England. One third of the council was up for election, with the Wednesfield North ward electing two Councillors due to the resignation of a Councillor in January 2010 – the winning candidate will serve a 4-year term of office and the second placed candidate will serve a 1-year term.

The 2010 election saw a full slate of 20 candidates from the Conservative, Labour and Liberal Democrat parties. UKIP and the British National Party each fielded 4 candidates and 5 independents also stood. The Green Party had no candidates for the first time in a number of years.

== Composition ==
Prior to the election, the composition of the council was:

- Labour Party 28
- Conservative Party 26
- Liberal Democrat 5
- Vacant 1

Following the election, the composition of the council is:

- Labour Party 29
- Conservative Party 26
- Liberal Democrat 5

== Election result ==
Wolverhampton local election result 2010
Party	Seats	Gains	Losses	Net gain/loss	Seats %	Votes %	Votes	+/−
Labour	29	1	0	+1	48.33	40.25	43520	
Conservative	26	0	1	-1	43.33	36.69	39668	
Liberal Democrats	5	0	0		8.33	18.29	19784	
BNP	0	0	0		0	1.75	1900	
Independent	0	0	0		0	1.53	1655	
UKIP	0	0	0		0	1.47	1592	

== Ward results ==
Bilston East
Party	Candidate	Votes	%	±%
Labour	Stephen Simkins	2165		
Conservative	Tom Fellows	1393		
Liberal Democrats	Paul Darke	562		
UKIP	Raymond Hollington	496		
Majority		772		
Labour hold		Swing		
Turnout				

Bilston North
Party	Candidate	Votes	%	±%
Labour	Phil Page	2262		
Conservative	Marlene Berry	1481		
Liberal Democrats	Frances Heap	663		
BNP	Stewart Gardner	589		
Majority		781		
Turnout				
Labour hold		Swing		

Blakenhall
Party	Candidate	Votes	%	±%
Labour	Judith Rowley	3140		
Conservative	Avtar Sidhu	1480		
Liberal Democrats	Javid Kakroo	406		
Majority		1660		
Turnout				
Labour hold		Swing		

Bushbury North
Party	Candidate	Votes	%	±%
Conservative	Neville Patten	2280		
Labour	Ian Claymore	1938		
Liberal Democrats	Ian Jenkins	811		
BNP	Simon Patten	621		
Majority		342		
Turnout		5713	64	
Conservative hold		Swing		

Bushbury South and Low Hill
Party	Candidate	Votes	%	±%
Labour	Paul Sweet	2339		
Conservative	Nick Thompson	1156		
Liberal Democrats	Bryan Lewis	624		
Majority		1183		
Turnout		4144	47.49	
Labour hold		Swing		

East Park
Party	Candidate	Votes	%	±%
Labour	Keith Inston	2040		
Conservative	Roger Cartwright	1199		
Liberal Democrats	Darren Friel	914		
BNP	John Painter	391		
Majority		841		
Turnout		4569	53.33	
Labour hold		Swing		

Ettingshall
Party	Candidate	Votes	%	±%
Labour	Andrew Johnson	3071		
Conservative	Sera Aulakh	975		
Liberal Democrats	Rajinder Singh	687		
Majority		2096		
Turnout		4786	55.81	
Labour hold		Swing		

Fallings Park
Party	Candidate	Votes	%	±%
Labour	Steven Wayne Evans	2500		
Conservative	Madelaine Wilson	1898		
Liberal Democrats	Stephen Birch	751		
Majority		602		
Turnout		5180	58.70	
Labour hold		Swing		

Graiseley
Party	Candidate	Votes	%	±%
Labour	Man Mohan Passi	2440		
Conservative	Nasim Ullah	1270		
Liberal Democrats	Eileen Birch	840		
Independent	John Mellor	600		
Majority		1170		
Turnout		5196	62.95	
Labour hold		Swing		

Heath Town
Party	Candidate	Votes	%	±%
Labour	Caroline Siarzewicz	2122		
Conservative	John Lee	1242		
Liberal Democrats	Roger Gray	675		
Majority		880		
Turnout		4037	54.17	
Labour hold		Swing		

Merry Hill
Party	Candidate	Votes	%	±%
Conservative	Christine Mills	2993		
Labour	Navjit Rana	1823		
Liberal Democrats	Alexandra Lawrence	1135		
Independent	Timothy Broomer	255		
Majority		1170		
Turnout		6272	68.58	
Conservative hold		Swing		

Oxley
Party	Candidate	Votes	%	±%
Labour	Julie Hodgkiss	2155		
Conservative	Neil Macleod	1965		
Liberal Democrats	John Steatham	745		
UKIP	Keith Sinclair	363		
Majority		190		
Turnout		5085	58.03	
Labour hold		Swing		

Park
Party	Candidate	Votes	%	±%
Labour	Manohar Minhas	2137		
Liberal Democrats	Jonathan Webber	1690		
Conservative	Martin Berrington	1423		
Majority		447		
Turnout		5292	66.91	
Labour hold		Swing		

Penn
Party	Candidate	Votes	%	±%
Conservative	Patricia Patten	3262		
Labour	Martin Waite	2286		
Liberal Democrats	June Hemsley	1244		
UKIP	Barry Hodgson	372		
Majority		967		
Turnout		7213	73.41	
Conservative hold		Swing		

Spring Vale
Party	Candidate	Votes	%	±%
Liberal Democrats	Malcolm Gwinnett	2330		
Labour	Valerie Gibson	1542		
Conservative	Ben Mills	1186		
Majority		788		
Turnout		5087	60.24	
Liberal Democrats hold		Swing		

St Peter's
Party	Candidate	Votes	%	±%
Labour	Tersaim Singh	1863		
Liberal Democrats	Zahid Shah	1228		
Conservative	Annette Pugh	588		
Majority		635		
Turnout		3713	55.06	
Labour hold		Swing		

Tettenhall Regis
Party	Candidate	Votes	%	±%
Conservative	Barry Findlay	3310		
Labour	David Hartley	1542		
Liberal Democrats	Paul Fellows	1081		
UKIP	Donald Morris	361		
Independent	Keith Sutton	62		
Majority		1768		
Turnout		6396	70.66	
Conservative hold		Swing		

Tettenhall Wightwick
Party	Candidate	Votes	%	±%
Conservative	Andrew Wynne	3829		
Labour	Muhammad Khan	1267		
Liberal Democrats	Sarah Fellows	1046		
BNP	David Bradnock	299		
Independent	Anthony Callaghan	121		
Majority		2562		
Turnout		6606	73.28	
Conservative hold		Swing		

Wednesfield North
Party	Candidate	Votes	%	±%
Conservative	Neil Clarke	2264		
Labour	Rita Potter	2210		
Conservative	Catherine Bisbey	2108		
Labour	Derek Wollam	1755		
Liberal Democrats	Carole Jenkins	748		
Liberal Democrats	Alan Bamber	720		
Independent	Derek Watts	617		
Majority		54		
Majority		102		
Turnout		5684	65.15	
Conservative hold		Swing		
Labour gain from Conservative		Swing		

Wednesfield South
Party	Candidate	Votes	%	±%
Conservative	Matthew Holdcroft	2366		
Labour	Bhupinder Gakhal	1918		
Liberal Democrats	Oliver Williams	884		
Majority		448		
Turnout		5215	62.79	
Conservative hold		Swing		
