= City of Wolverhampton Council elections =

English local government elections

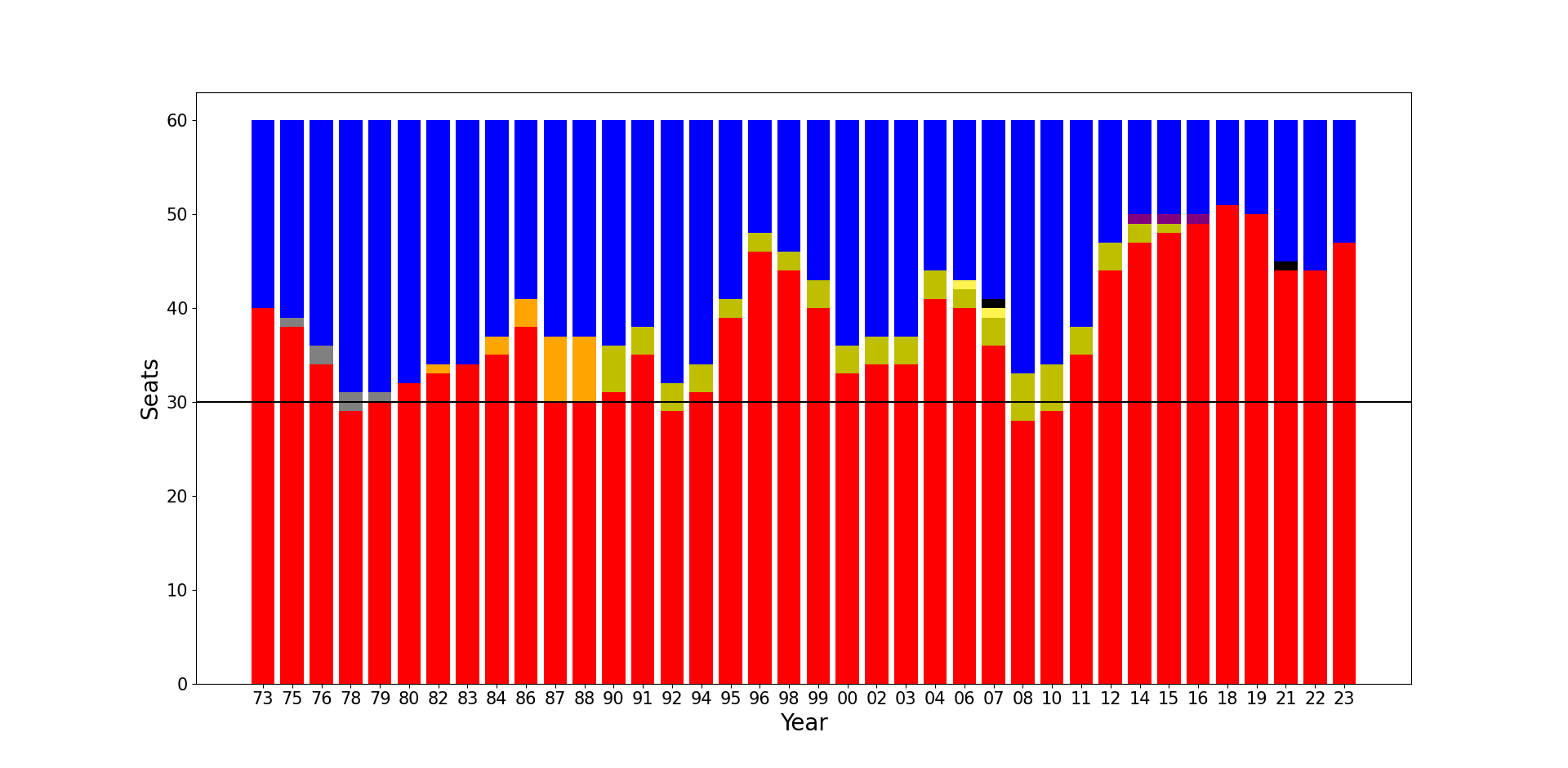
Seats by parties in Wolverhampton council after each election from 1973 to 2023.

City of Wolverhampton Council elections are held three years out of every four, with a third of the council elected each time. City of Wolverhampton Council is the local authority for the metropolitan borough of Wolverhampton in the West Midlands, England. Since the boundary changes in 2004, 60 councillors have been elected from 20 wards.

== Council elections ==
- 1973 Wolverhampton Metropolitan Borough Council election
- 1975 Wolverhampton Metropolitan Borough Council election
- 1976 Wolverhampton Metropolitan Borough Council election
- 1978 Wolverhampton Metropolitan Borough Council election
- 1979 Wolverhampton Metropolitan Borough Council election
- 1980 Wolverhampton Metropolitan Borough Council election
- 1982 Wolverhampton Metropolitan Borough Council election
- 1983 Wolverhampton Metropolitan Borough Council election
- 1984 Wolverhampton Metropolitan Borough Council election
- 1986 Wolverhampton Metropolitan Borough Council election
- 1987 Wolverhampton Metropolitan Borough Council election
- 1988 Wolverhampton Metropolitan Borough Council election
- 1990 Wolverhampton Metropolitan Borough Council election
- 1991 Wolverhampton Metropolitan Borough Council election
- 1992 Wolverhampton Metropolitan Borough Council election
- 1994 Wolverhampton Metropolitan Borough Council election
- 1995 Wolverhampton Metropolitan Borough Council election
- 1996 Wolverhampton Metropolitan Borough Council election
- 1998 Wolverhampton Metropolitan Borough Council election
- 1999 Wolverhampton Metropolitan Borough Council election
- 2000 Wolverhampton Metropolitan Borough Council election
- 2002 Wolverhampton City Council election
- 2003 Wolverhampton City Council election
- 2004 Wolverhampton City Council election (new ward boundaries)
- 2006 Wolverhampton City Council election
- 2007 Wolverhampton City Council election
- 2008 Wolverhampton City Council election
- 2010 Wolverhampton City Council election
- 2011 Wolverhampton City Council election
- 2012 Wolverhampton City Council election
- 2014 Wolverhampton City Council election
- 2015 Wolverhampton City Council election
- 2016 City of Wolverhampton Council election
- 2018 City of Wolverhampton Council election
- 2019 City of Wolverhampton Council election
- 2021 City of Wolverhampton Council election
- 2022 City of Wolverhampton Council election
- 2023 City of Wolverhampton Council election (new ward boundaries)
- 2024 City of Wolverhampton Council election
- 2026 City of Wolverhampton Council election

== Borough result maps ==
2004 results map

2006 results map

2007 results map

2008 results map

2010 results map

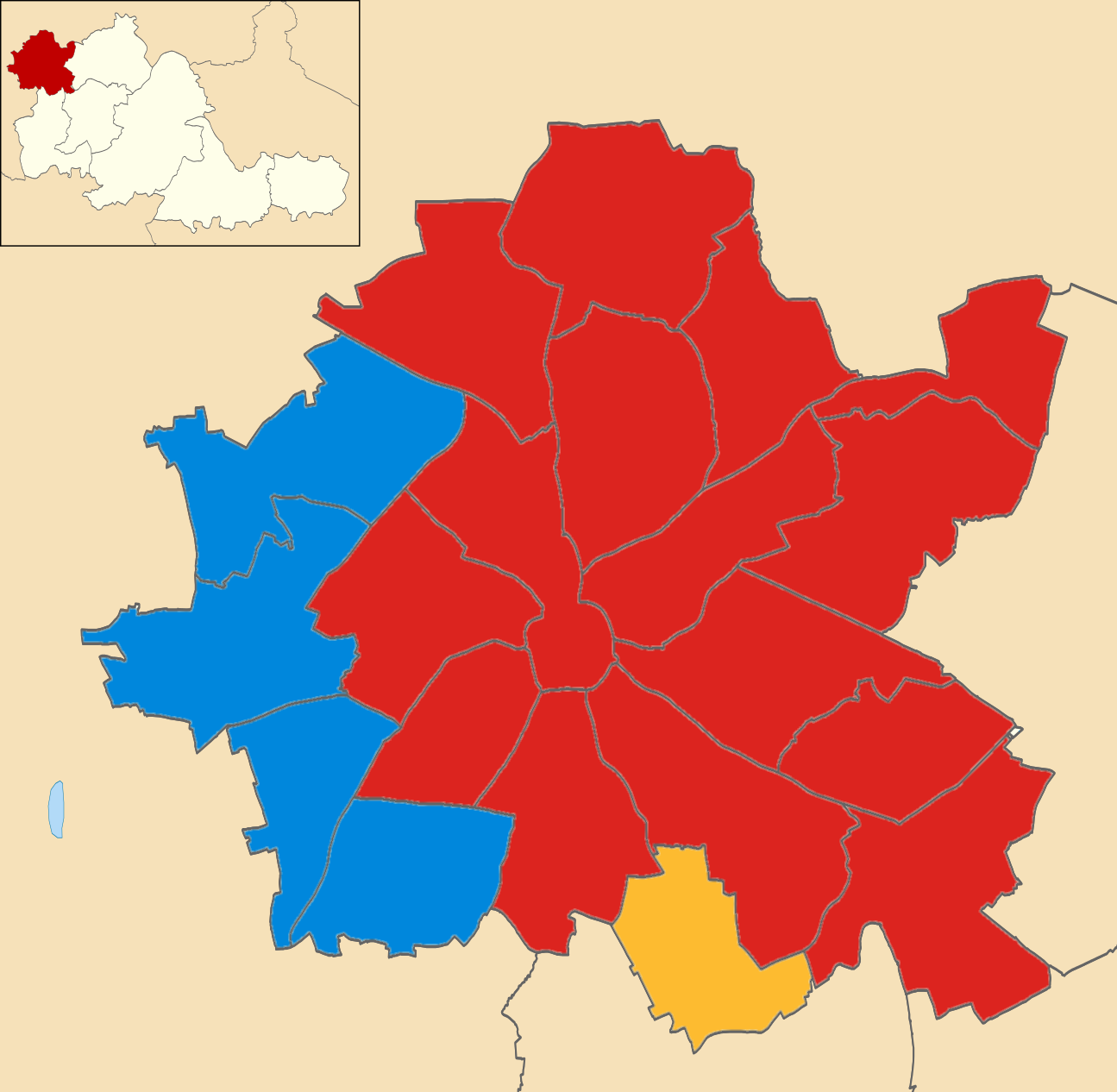
2011 results map

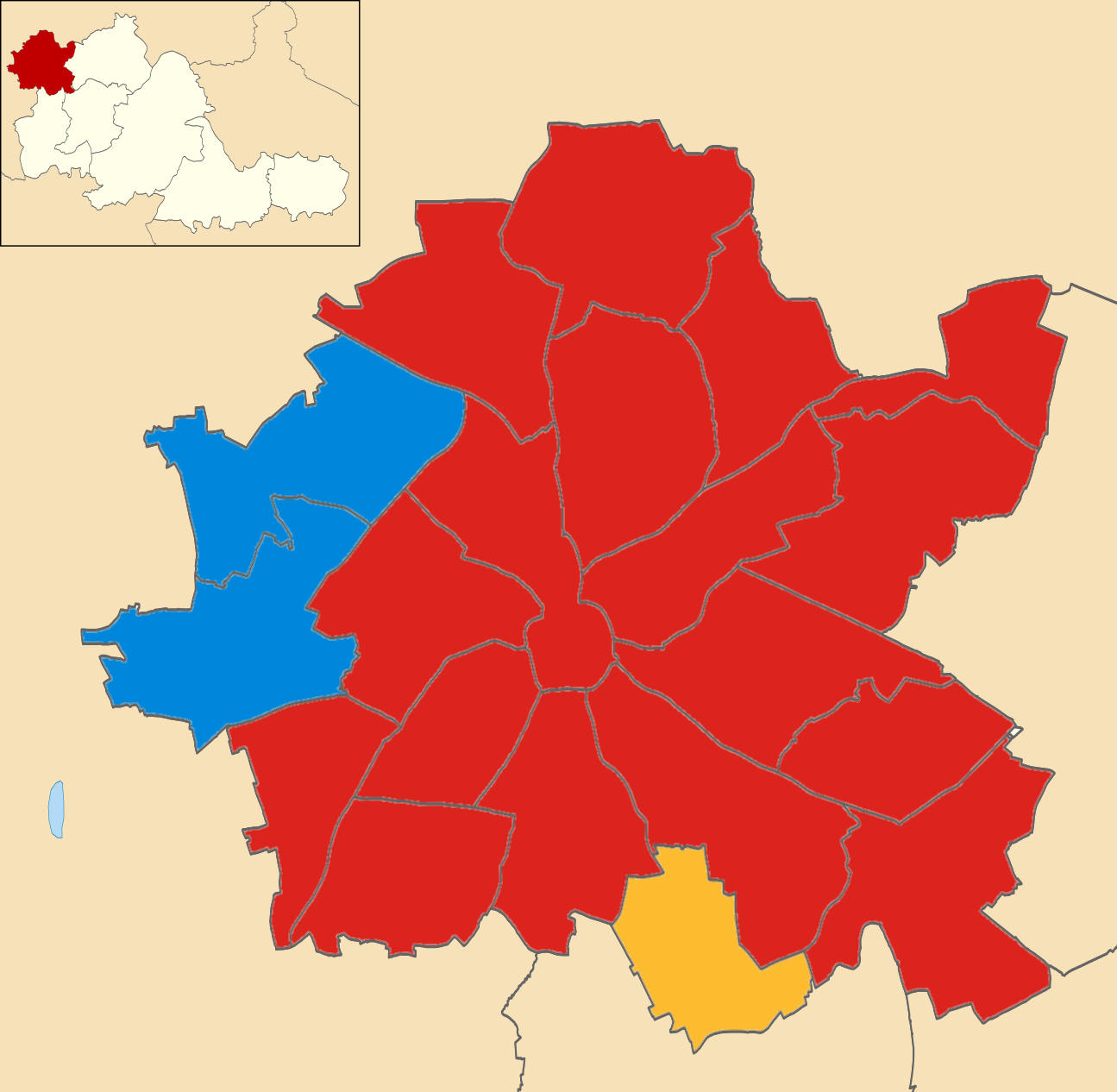
2012 results map

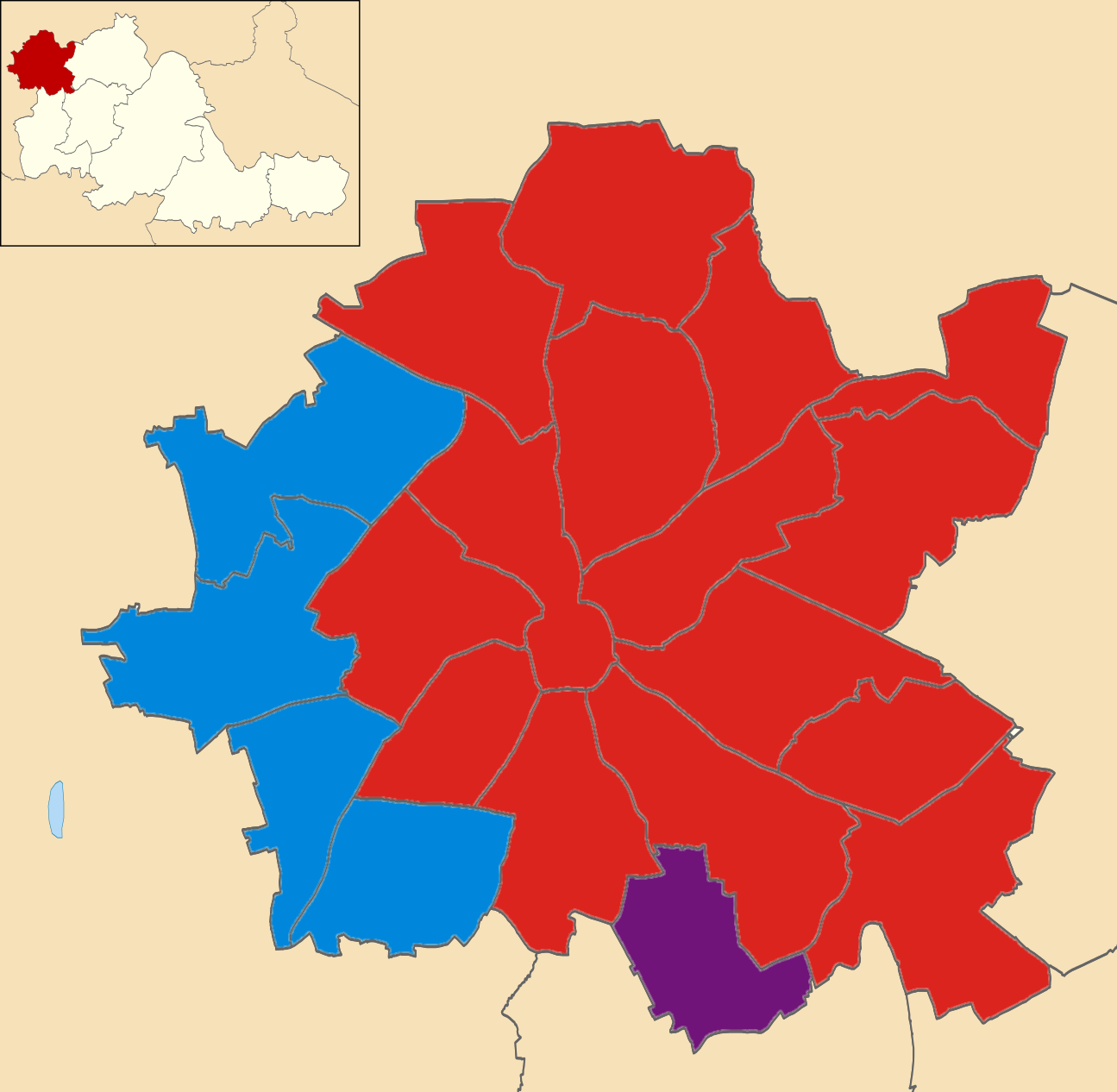
2014 results map

2015 results map

2016 results map

2018 results map

2019 results map

2021 results map

2022 results map

2023 results map

2024 results map

2026 results map

== By-election results ==
=== 1994–1998 ===
Heath Town By-Election 17 October 1996
Party	Candidate	Votes	%	±%
Labour	Greg Brackenridge	1,172	63.8	
Liberal Democrats		437	23.8	
Conservative	Peter O'Connell	227	12.4	
Majority		735	40.0	
Turnout		1,836	22.8	
Labour hold		Swing		

Ettingshall By-Election 10 July 1997
Party	Candidate	Votes	%	±%
Labour	Alan Smith	949	72.9	−5.1
Conservative	Simon Jevon	223	17.1	+0.7
Liberal Democrats		130	10.0	+4.3
Majority		726	55.8	
Turnout		1,302	16.1	
Labour hold		Swing		

Merry Hill By-Election 25 September 1997
Party	Candidate	Votes	%	±%
Conservative	Robert Hart	1,395	51.7	+3.6
Labour		1,003	37.2	−5.3
Liberal Democrats		298	11.1	+1.6
Majority		392	14.5	
Turnout		2,696		
Conservative gain from Labour		Swing		

=== 1998–2002 ===
Fallings Park By-Election 10 June 1999
Party	Candidate	Votes	%	±%
Labour		941	46.9	−2.9
Conservative		841	41.9	+2.4
Liberal Democrats		225	11.2	+11.2
Majority		100	5.0	
Turnout		2,007		
Labour hold		Swing		

=== 2002–2006 ===
Tettenhall Regis By-Election 13 March 2003
Party	Candidate	Votes	%	±%
Conservative	Jonathan Yardley	1,279	62.5	+0.1
Liberal Democrats	Ian Jenkins	431	21.0	+7.3
Labour	Michael Stafford	338	16.5	−7.4
Majority		848	41.5	
Turnout		2,048	22.5	
Conservative hold		Swing		

=== 2006–2010 ===
Wednesfield North By-Election 23 October 2008
Party	Candidate	Votes	%	±%
Conservative	Neil Clarke	1,295	45.3	+0.1
Labour	David Jones	1,072	37.5	+3.0
BNP	Dennis Organ	337	11.8	−3.6
Liberal Democrats	Ian Jenkins	156	5.5	+0.5
Majority		223	7.8	
Turnout		2,860	31.7	
Conservative hold		Swing		

Wednesfield South By-Election 23 October 2008
Party	Candidate	Votes	%	±%
Conservative	Peter Dobb	1,123	45.2	−16.1
Labour	Mike Hardacre	867	34.9	+8.0
BNP	David Bradnock	358	14.4	+14.4
Liberal Democrats	John Steatham	134	5.4	−1.4
Majority		256	10.3	
Turnout		2,482	28.5	
Conservative hold		Swing		

Heath Town By-Election 5 February 2009
Party	Candidate	Votes	%	±%
Labour	Milkinderpal Jaspal	621	49.1	+3.1
Conservative	Madeleine Wilson	497	39.3	−14.8
Liberal Democrats	Stephen Birch	147	11.6	+11.6
Majority		124	9.8	
Turnout		1,265	17.2	
Labour hold		Swing		

Ettingshall By-Election 26 March 2009
Party	Candidate	Votes	%	±%
Labour	Sandra Samuels	1,274	58.8	+0.3
Conservative	Arun Photay	449	20.7	−3.8
Liberal Democrats	Stephanie Kerrigan	366	16.9	−0.1
Independent	Jaswinder Tinsa	77	3.6	+3.6
Majority		825	38.1	
Turnout		2,166	25.2	
Labour hold		Swing		

=== 2010–2014 ===
Bilston North By-Election 29 July 2010
Party	Candidate	Votes	%	±%
Labour	Linda Leach	1,292		
Conservative	Marlene Berry	460		
BNP	Stewart Gardner	131		
UKIP	Barry Hodgson	55		
Liberal Democrats	Darren Friel	52		
Majority		832		
Turnout		1,993	22.3	
Labour gain from Conservative		Swing		

Graiseley By-Election 15 September 2011
Party	Candidate	Votes	%	±%
Labour	Jacqueline Sweetman	1,527	64.7	+0.2
Conservative	John Mellor	591	25.0	+8.5
Liberal Democrats	Eileen Birch	177	7.5	+2.1
UKIP	Don Cooper	65	2.8	+2.8
Majority		936	39.7	
Turnout		2,369	28.2	
Labour hold		Swing	-4.2	

Park By-Election 15 November 2012
Party	Candidate	Votes	%	±%
Labour	Craig Collingswood	1,023	58.0	
Conservative	Jenny Brewer	482	27.3	
Liberal Democrats	Roger Gray	179	10.1	
UKIP	Don Cooper	81	4.6	
Majority		538		
Turnout		1,815		
Labour hold		Swing	-	

Blakenhall By-Election 2 May 2013
Party	Candidate	Votes	%	±%
Labour	Harbans Singh Bagri	1,934	76.5	−9.2
UKIP	David Mackintosh	263	10.4	+10.4
Conservative	Stephen Dion	242	9.6	−4.7
Liberal Democrats	Eileen Birch	89	3.5	
Majority		1,671	66.1	
Turnout		2,528		
Labour hold		Swing	-	

=== 2022–2026 ===
East Park By-Election 7 April 2022
Party	Candidate	Votes	%	±%
Labour	Lovinyer Daley	783	65.52	
Conservative	Steve Hall	412	32.48	
Majority		371	32.94	
Turnout		1,195	13.18	
Labour hold		Swing		

Bushbury South and Low Hill By-Election 28 September 2023
Party	Candidate	Votes	%	±%
Labour	Paul Brookfield	686	59.2	−5.4
Conservative	Rob Williams	256	22.1	−0.5
Liberal Democrats	Ian Jenkins	139	12.0	−0.8
Green	Mohammed Naseem	78	6.7	+6.7
Majority		430	37.1	
Turnout		1,159		
Labour hold		Swing		

Bilston North By-Election 31 October 2024
Party	Candidate	Votes	%	±%
Reform	Anita Stanley	652	34.8	New
Labour	Luke Matthew Guy	471	25.2	−46.1
Green	Hardev Singh	438	23.4	New
Conservative	Andrew Randle	257	13.7	−15.0
Liberal Democrats	Julian Martin Donald	55	2.9	New
Majority		181	9.7	
Turnout		1,873	19.2	
Reform gain from Labour		Swing		
