= 2023 City of Wolverhampton Council election =

2023 local election in Wolverhampton

| ← 2022 | 4 May 2023 | 2024 → |

All 60 seats to City of Wolverhampton Council 31 seats needed for a majority

| | First party | Second party |
|---|---|---|
| Leader | Ian Brookfield | Wendy Thompson |
| Party | Labour | Conservative |
| Last election | 44 seats, 57.3% | 16 seats, 34.8% |
| Seats won | 47 | 13 |
| Seat change | ▲3 | ▼3 |
| Popular vote | 74,536 | 48,250 |
| Percentage | 57.2% | 37.0% |
| Swing | ▼0.1% | ▲2.2% |
- Winner of each seat at the 2023 City of Wolverhampton Council election
Leader before election
Ian Brookfield
Labour
Leader after election
Ian Brookfield
Labour

The 2023 City of Wolverhampton Council election took place on 4 May 2023, alongside other local elections across the United Kingdom. Due to changes in the boundaries of the wards, all 60 seats on the City of Wolverhampton Council, were up for election. All twenty wards elected three councillors. Labour increased its majority on the council.

== Background ==
In 2023, The Local Government Boundary Commission for England created the Wolverhampton (Electoral Changes) Order 2023, abolishing all 20 wards of the city council and replaced them with wards that have newly drawn boundaries. The number of wards and councillors remains the same as the previous election. The next election will be in 2024, with a third of the council (20 Seats) up for election of which are those candidates who finished 3rd at this poll.

=== Pre-Election Composition ===
| Party | Seats |
|---|---|
| Labour Party | 44 |
| Conservative Party | 16 |

== Summary ==
=== Election result ===
2023 City of Wolverhampton Council election
| Party | Candidates | Seats | Gains | Losses | Net gain/loss | Seats % | Votes % | Votes | +/− |
|---|---|---|---|---|---|---|---|---|---|
| Labour | 60 | 47 | 3 | 0 | ▲3 | 78.3 | 57.2 | 74,536 | –0.1 |
| Conservative | 60 | 13 | 0 | 3 | ▼3 | 21.7 | 37.0 | 48,250 | +2.2 |
| Liberal Democrats | 18 | 0 | 0 | 0 | Steady | 0.0 | 3.3 | 4,273 | –1.9 |
| Green | 9 | 0 | 0 | 0 | Steady | 0.0 | 2.1 | 2,759 | –0.4 |
| Independent | 3 | 0 | 0 | 0 | Steady | 0.0 | 0.2 | 324 | N/A |
| Reform UK | 1 | 0 | 0 | 0 | Steady | 0.0 | 0.1 | 164 | N/A |
| TUSC | 1 | 0 | 0 | 0 | Steady | 0.0 | 0.1 | 89 | –0.2 |

== Ward results ==
The following is a list of candidates by council ward.

Sitting Councillors of whom sought re-election, are marked with an asterisk (*).

=== Bilston North ===
Bilston North (3 Seats)
| Party | Candidate | Votes | % | ±% |
|---|---|---|---|---|
| Labour | Linda Leach* | 1,449 | 67.06 | |
| Labour | Susan Roberts* | 1,171 | 54.31 | |
| Labour | Rohit Mistry | 1,152 | 54.43 | |
| Conservative | Audrey Okere | 572 | 26.53 | |
| Conservative | Dan Perry-Preston | 521 | 24.17 | |
| Conservative | Surrinder Ram | 424 | 19.66 | |
| Green | Mia Clark | 274 | 12.71 | |
| Rejected ballots | | 11 | | |
| Turnout | | 2,156 | 22.72 | |
| Labour hold | | | | |
| Labour hold | | | | |
| Labour hold | | | | |

=== Bilston South ===
Bilston South (3 Seats)
| Party | Candidate | Votes | % | ±% |
|---|---|---|---|---|
| Labour | Stephen Simkins* | 1,167 | 64.12 | |
| Labour | Gillian Wildman* | 1,118 | 61.43 | |
| Labour | Rashpal Kaur* | 1,102 | 60.55 | |
| Conservative | Paul Hammond | 379 | 20.82 | |
| Conservative | Michael Rogers | 371 | 20.38 | |
| Conservative | Christopher Thompson | 367 | 20.16 | |
| Liberal Democrats | Jessica Pringle | 176 | 9.67 | |
| Liberal Democrats | Anna Khan | 126 | 6.92 | |
| Liberal Democrats | Hristina Atanasova | 121 | 6.65 | |
| Rejected ballots | | 10 | | |
| Turnout | | 1,820 | 17.78 | |
| Labour hold | | | | |
| Labour hold | | | | |
| Labour hold | | | | |

=== Blakenhall ===
Blakenhall (3 Seats)
| Party | Candidate | Votes | % | ±% |
|---|---|---|---|---|
| Labour Co-op | Bhupinder Gakhal* | 1,716 | 67.88 | |
| Labour Co-op | Tersaim Singh* | 1,642 | 64.95 | |
| Labour Co-op | Sally Green | 1,616 | 63.92 | |
| Conservative | Sunni Kaur | 490 | 19.38 | |
| Conservative | Mark Cooper | 438 | 17.32 | |
| Conservative | Sangeeta Bedi | 400 | 15.82 | |
| Liberal Democrats | Patrick Bentley | 245 | 9.69 | |
| Rejected ballots | | 11 | | |
| Turnout | | 2,528 | 29.14 | |
| Labour Co-op hold | | | | |
| Labour Co-op hold | | | | |
| Labour Co-op hold | | | | |

=== Bushbury North ===
Bushbury North (3 Seats)
| Party | Candidate | Votes | % | ±% |
|---|---|---|---|---|
| Conservative | Paul Appleby* | 1,236 | 48.11 | |
| Conservative | Andrew McNeil* | 1,225 | 47.68 | |
| Conservative | Simon Bennett* | 1,151 | 44.80 | |
| Labour | Gary Edwards | 1,081 | 42.08 | |
| Labour | Steve Russell | 1,018 | 39.63 | |
| Labour | Rob Siarkiewicz | 954 | 37.14 | |
| Liberal Democrats | Harry Marston | 255 | 9.93 | |
| Liberal Democrats | Alan Bamber | 194 | 7.55 | |
| Rejected ballots | | 26 | | |
| Turnout | | 2,569 | 26.58 | |
| Conservative hold | | | | |
| Conservative hold | | | | |
| Conservative hold | | | | |

=== Bushbury South and Low Hill ===
Bushbury South and Low Hill (3 Seats)
| Party | Candidate | Votes | % | ±% |
|---|---|---|---|---|
| Labour | Paula Brookfield* | 1,002 | 64.69 | |
| Labour | Ian Brookfield* | 979 | 63.20 | |
| Labour | Paul Sweet* | 931 | 60.10 | |
| Conservative | Simon Hewitt | 351 | 22.66 | |
| Conservative | Dawn McNeil | 303 | 19.56 | |
| Conservative | Freya Wastell | 292 | 18.85 | |
| Liberal Democrats | Ann Jenkins | 198 | 12.78 | |
| Rejected ballots | | 9 | | |
| Turnout | | 1,549 | 16.35 | |
| Labour hold | | | | |
| Labour hold | | | | |
| Labour hold | | | | |

=== East Park ===
East Park (3 Seats)
| Party | Candidate | Votes | % | ±% |
|---|---|---|---|---|
| Labour | Lovinyer Daley* | 1,150 | 67.89 | |
| Labour | Louise Miles* | 1,113 | 65.70 | |
| Labour | Anwen Muston* | 1,018 | 60.09 | |
| Conservative | Allen Roberts | 298 | 17.59 | |
| Conservative | Aran Cheema | 295 | 17.41 | |
| Conservative | Reetu Agrawal | 290 | 17.12 | |
| Independent | Steve Hall | 126 | 7.44 | |
| Independent | Aaron Hall | 118 | 6.97 | |
| Green | Martin Kruczynski | 110 | 6.49 | |
| Independent | Jake Hall | 80 | 4.71 | |
| Rejected ballots | | 9 | | |
| Turnout | | 1,694 | 18.48 | |
| Labour hold | | | | |
| Labour hold | | | | |
| Labour hold | | | | |

=== Ettingshall North ===
Ettingshall North (3 Seats)
| Party | Candidate | Votes | % | ±% |
|---|---|---|---|---|
| Labour | Jenny Cockayne | 1,538 | 69.47 | |
| Labour | Jeszemma Howl | 1,447 | 65.36 | |
| Labour | Zee Russell* | 1,405 | 63.46 | |
| Conservative | Raj Chagger | 434 | 19.60 | |
| Conservative | Atul Kumar | 419 | 18.93 | |
| Conservative | Emily Williams | 403 | 18.20 | |
| Green | Stephen Petter | 225 | 10.16 | |
| Rejected ballots | | 15 | | |
| Turnout | | 2,214 | 22.72 | |
| Labour hold | | | | |
| Labour hold | | | | |
| Labour hold | | | | |

=== Ettingshall South and Spring Vale ===
Ettingshall South and Spring Vale (3 Seats)
| Party | Candidate | Votes | % | ±% |
|---|---|---|---|---|
| Labour Co-op | Lamina Lloyd | 1,305 | 51.69 | |
| Labour Co-op | Jas Dehar* | 1,262 | 49.98 | |
| Labour Co-op | Harbinder Singh | 1,236 | 48.95 | |
| Conservative | Mak Singh* | 892 | 35.33 | |
| Conservative | Sian Kumar | 836 | 33.88 | |
| Conservative | Surjit Khunkhun | 805 | 33.11 | |
| Green | Rosa van Doorn | 279 | 11.05 | |
| Rejected ballots | | 10 | | |
| Turnout | | 2,525 | 26.15 | |
| Labour Co-op hold | | | | |
| Labour Co-op hold | | | | |
| Labour Co-op gain from Conservative | | | | |

=== Fallings Park ===
Fallings Park (3 Seats)
| Party | Candidate | Votes | % | ±% |
|---|---|---|---|---|
| Labour | Steve Evans* | 1,079 | 54.69 | |
| Labour | Chris Burden* | 1,061 | 53.78 | |
| Labour | Valerie Evans* | 1,037 | 52.43 | |
| Conservative | Julia Dickens | 739 | 37.46 | |
| Conservative | Robert Williams | 724 | 36.70 | |
| Conservative | Sucha Sahota | 603 | 30.56 | |
| Liberal Democrats | Peter Nixon | 194 | 9.83 | |
| Rejected ballots | | 8 | | |
| Turnout | | 1,973 | 21.93 | |
| Labour hold | | | | |
| Labour hold | | | | |
| Labour hold | | | | |

=== Graiseley ===
Graiseley (3 Seats)
| Party | Candidate | Votes | % | ±% |
|---|---|---|---|---|
| Labour Co-op | Asha Mattu* | 1,606 | 64.21 | |
| Labour Co-op | John Reynolds* | 1,541 | 61.62 | |
| Labour Co-op | Jacqueline Sweetman* | 1,500 | 59.98 | |
| Conservative | Marlene Berry | 603 | 24.11 | |
| Conservative | James Montero | 502 | 20.07 | |
| Conservative | Mohammed Salim | 480 | 19.19 | |
| Green | Amy Bertaut | 433 | 17.31 | |
| Rejected ballots | | 10 | | |
| Turnout | | 2,501 | 28.72 | |
| Labour Co-op hold | | | | |
| Labour Co-op hold | | | | |
| Labour Co-op hold | | | | |

=== Heath Town ===
Heath Town (3 Seats)
| Party | Candidate | Votes | % | ±% |
|---|---|---|---|---|
| Labour | Jasbir Jaspal* | 910 | 56.07 | |
| Labour | Milkinderpal Jaspal* | 903 | 55.64 | |
| Labour | Jaspreet Jaspal* | 873 | 53.79 | |
| Conservative | Stephanie Amanze | 416 | 25.63 | |
| Conservative | Adam Wood | 410 | 25.26 | |
| Conservative | Joseph Banla | 342 | 21.07 | |
| Green | Kwaku Tano-Yeboah | 315 | 19.41 | |
| Rejected ballots | | 13 | | |
| Turnout | | 1,623 | 18.76 | |
| Labour hold | | | | |
| Labour hold | | | | |
| Labour hold | | | | |

=== Merry Hill ===
Merry Hill (3 Seats)
| Party | Candidate | Votes | % | ±% |
|---|---|---|---|---|
| Conservative | Wendy Dalton* | 1,525 | 49.97 | |
| Labour | Carol Hyatt* | 1,358 | 44.50 | |
| Conservative | Chris Haynes* | 1,352 | 44.30 | |
| Conservative | Tony Gething | 1,335 | 43.74 | |
| Labour | Suki Bains | 1,256 | 41.15 | |
| Labour | Bryan Cook | 1,218 | 39.91 | |
| Green | Paul Darke | 448 | 16.68 | |
| Rejected ballots | | 16 | | |
| Turnout | | 3,052 | 33.37 | |
| Conservative hold | | | | |
| Labour hold | | | | |
| Conservative hold | | | | |

=== Oxley ===
Oxley (3 Seats)
| Party | Candidate | Votes | % | ±% |
|---|---|---|---|---|
| Labour Co-op | Alan Butt | 1,329 | 51.55 | |
| Labour Co-op | Jayne Francis | 1,302 | 50.50 | |
| Labour Co-op | Barbara McGarrity* | 1,244 | 48.25 | |
| Conservative | Adam Collinge* | 996 | 38.63 | |
| Conservative | Sally Garner | 910 | 35.30 | |
| Conservative | Maurice Harris | 858 | 33.28 | |
| Liberal Democrats | Ian Jenkins | 243 | 9.43 | |
| Liberal Democrats | Salah Abbes | 175 | 6.79 | |
| Liberal Democrats | Rachel Ashby-Filippin | 174 | 6.75 | |
| TUSC | Joshua Allerton | 89 | 3.45 | |
| Rejected ballots | | 7 | | |
| Turnout | | 2,578 | 25.22 | |
| Labour Co-op hold | | | | |
| Labour Co-op hold | | | | |
| Labour Co-op gain from Conservative | | | | |

=== Park ===
Park (3 Seats)
| Party | Candidate | Votes | % | ±% |
|---|---|---|---|---|
| Labour | Claire Darke* | 1,743 | 62.79 | |
| Labour | Craig Collingswood* | 1,742 | 62.75 | |
| Labour | Michael Hardacre* | 1,602 | 57.70 | |
| Conservative | Robert Brotherton | 732 | 26.90 | |
| Conservative | David Davies | 711 | 25.61 | |
| Conservative | Sham Sharma | 639 | 23.02 | |
| Liberal Democrats | Bryan Lewis | 260 | 9.37 | |
| Liberal Democrats | Roger Gray | 247 | 8.90 | |
| Liberal Democrats | Arfan Khan | 193 | 6.95 | |
| Rejected ballots | | 16 | | |
| Turnout | | 2,776 | 29.40 | |
| Labour hold | | | | |
| Labour hold | | | | |
| Labour hold | | | | |

=== Penn ===
Penn (3 Seats)
| Party | Candidate | Votes | % | ±% |
|---|---|---|---|---|
| Labour | Celia Hibbert* | 1,934 | 51.53 | |
| Conservative | Stephanie Haynes* | 1,800 | 47.96 | |
| Conservative | Paul Singh* | 1,596 | 42.52 | |
| Labour | Kashmire Hawker | 1,550 | 41.30 | |
| Conservative | Ranjit Dillon | 1,431 | 38.12 | |
| Labour | Mohammed Naseem | 1,358 | 36.18 | |
| Liberal Democrats | Michael Hopkins | 395 | 10.52 | |
| Rejected ballots | | 12 | | |
| Turnout | | 3,753 | 38.29 | |
| Labour hold | | | | |
| Conservative hold | | | | |
| Conservative hold | | | | |

=== St. Peter's ===
St Peters (3 Seats)
| Party | Candidate | Votes | % | ±% |
|---|---|---|---|---|
| Labour | Obaida Ahmed* | 1,234 | 67.73 | |
| Labour | Qaiser Azeem* | 1,208 | 66.30 | |
| Labour | Iqra Tahir | 1,108 | 60.81 | |
| Liberal Democrats | David Murray | 398 | 21.84 | |
| Conservative | Joan Stevenson | 312 | 17.12 | |
| Conservative | Gillian Timms | 294 | 16.14 | |
| Conservative | Imre Stanley | 183 | 10.04 | |
| Rejected ballots | | 11 | | |
| Turnout | | 1,822 | 21.67 | |
| Labour hold | | | | |
| Labour hold | | | | |
| Labour hold | | | | |

=== Tettenhall Regis ===
Tettenhall Regis (3 Seats)
| Party | Candidate | Votes | % | ±% |
|---|---|---|---|---|
| Conservative | Robert Maddox | 1,658 | 53.64 | |
| Conservative | Sohail Khan* | 1,509 | 48.82 | |
| Conservative | Udey Singh* | 1,506 | 48.72 | |
| Labour | Ben Evans | 1,106 | 35.78 | |
| Labour | Andrew Morris | 1,089 | 35.23 | |
| Labour | Chester Morrison | 1,027 | 33.23 | |
| Liberal Democrats | Sarah Fellows | 397 | 12.84 | |
| Liberal Democrats | Julian Donald | 282 | 9.12 | |
| Rejected ballots | | 10 | | |
| Turnout | | 3,091 | 33.34 | |
| Conservative hold | | | | |
| Conservative hold | | | | |
| Conservative hold | | | | |

=== Tettenhall Wightwick ===
Tettenhall Wightwick (3 Seats)
| Party | Candidate | Votes | % | ±% |
|---|---|---|---|---|
| Conservative | Wendy Thompson* | 2,178 | 61.82 | |
| Conservative | Jonathon Crofts* | 2,088 | 59.27 | |
| Conservative | Ellis Turrell* | 2,085 | 59.18 | |
| Labour | Leigh New | 1,043 | 29.61 | |
| Labour | Darren Porter | 1,009 | 28.64 | |
| Labour | Alan Simmons | 929 | 26.37 | |
| Green | Andrea Cantrill | 478 | 13.57 | |
| Rejected ballots | | 9 | | |
| Turnout | | 3,523 | 39.10 | |
| Conservative hold | | | | |
| Conservative hold | | | | |
| Conservative hold | | | | |

=== Wednesfield North ===
Wednesfield North (3 Seats)
| Party | Candidate | Votes | % | ±% |
|---|---|---|---|---|
| Labour | Phillip Bateman* | 1,213 | 56.47 | |
| Labour | Rita Potter* | 1,153 | 53.68 | |
| Labour | Mary Bateman* | 1,151 | 53.58 | |
| Conservative | Nathaniel Williams | 780 | 36.31 | |
| Conservative | Janette Wastell | 653 | 30.40 | |
| Conservative | Joseph Stepien | 644 | 29.98 | |
| Green | Ayden Young | 197 | 9.17 | |
| Rejected ballots | | 13 | | |
| Turnout | | 2,148 | 25.35 | |
| Labour hold | | | | |
| Labour hold | | | | |
| Labour hold | | | | |

=== Wednesfield South ===
Wednesfield South (3 Seats)
| Party | Candidate | Votes | % | ±% |
|---|---|---|---|---|
| Labour | Greg Brackenridge* | 1,213 | 52.49 | |
| Labour | Ciaran Brackenridge | 1,168 | 50.54 | |
| Labour | Jacqui Coogan | 1,167 | 50.49 | |
| Conservative | Lewis Wastell | 843 | 36.48 | |
| Conservative | Peter Dickens | 835 | 36.13 | |
| Conservative | Andy Randle* | 786 | 34.01 | |
| Reform UK | Simon Kelsey | 164 | 7.10 | |
| Rejected ballots | | 8 | | |
| Turnout | | 2,311 | 25.96 | |
| Labour hold | | | | |
| Labour gain from Conservative | | | | |
| Labour hold | | | | |

== By-elections ==
=== Bushbury South and Low Hill ===
Bushbury South and Low Hill: 28 September 2023
| Party | Candidate | Votes | % | ±% |
|---|---|---|---|---|
| Labour | Paul Brookfield | 686 | 59.2 | –5.4 |
| Conservative | Rob Williams | 256 | 22.1 | –0.5 |
| Liberal Democrats | Ian Jenkins | 139 | 12.0 | –0.8 |
| Green | Mohammed Naseem | 78 | 6.7 | N/A |
| Majority | | 430 | 37.1 | |
| Turnout | | 1,169 | | |
| Labour hold | | Swing | ▼2.5 | |
