= 1999 Wolverhampton Metropolitan Borough Council election =

1999 UK local government election

The 1999 Wolverhampton Metropolitan Borough Council election took place on 6 May 1999 to elect members of Wolverhampton Metropolitan Borough Council in the West Midlands, England. One third of the council was up for election and the Labour party kept overall control of the council. Overall turnout in the election was 30.63%.

After the election, the composition of the council was

- Labour 39
- Conservative 17
- Liberal Democrat 3

== Election results ==
The results saw Labour keep its majority on the council but lose four seats to other parties. The Conservatives gained seats in Bushbury, Merry Hill and Park wards, while the Liberal Democrats gained in Spring Vale.

Wolverhampton local election result 1999
Party	Seats	Gains	Losses	Net gain/loss	Seats %	Votes %	Votes	+/−
Labour	12	0	4	-4	60.0	47.7	26,620	+0.6%
Conservative	7	3	0	+3	35.0	39.0	21,734	+1.1%
Liberal Democrats	1	1	0	+1	5.0	11.5	6,396	-1.4%
Liberal	0	0	0	0	0	1.9	1,055	+0.2%

== Ward results ==
Bilston East
Party	Candidate	Votes	%	±%
Labour	Thomas Turner	1,191	66.1	+0.8
Conservative	Arthur Mills	375	20.8	+1.3
Liberal Democrats	Edward Pringle	236	13.1	−2.0
Majority		816	45.3	−0.5
Turnout		1,802	22.1	+1.4
Labour hold		Swing		

Bilston North
Party	Candidate	Votes	%	±%
Labour	Margaret Benton	1,292	53.4	−0.8
Conservative	Alwyne Murray	907	37.5	+0.0
Liberal Democrats	Michael Rowan	222	9.2	+0.9
Majority		385	15.9	−0.8
Turnout		2,421	23.2	−0.9
Labour hold		Swing		

Blakenhall
Party	Candidate	Votes	%	±%
Labour	Judith Rowley	2,197	72.6	−3.8
Conservative	John Corns	670	22.1	+4.9
Liberal Democrats	June Hemsley	158	5.2	−1.2
Majority		1,527	50.5	−8.7
Turnout		3,025	34.5	+3.2
Labour hold		Swing		

Bushbury
Party	Candidate	Votes	%	±%
Conservative	Christine Riddle	1,295	49.3	−1.7
Labour	James O'Grady	1,110	42.2	+2.1
Liberal Democrats	David Buckley	224	8.5	−0.4
Majority		185	7.1	−3.8
Turnout		2,629	29.8	+0.4
Conservative gain from Labour		Swing		

East Park
Party	Candidate	Votes	%	±%
Labour	Francis Docherty	1,305	68.9	+2.2
Conservative	Maxine Bradley	414	21.8	−1.1
Liberal Democrats	Ann Whitehouse	176	9.3	−1.1
Majority		891	47.1	+3.3
Turnout		1,895	23.1	−1.1
Labour hold		Swing		

Ettingshall
Party	Candidate	Votes	%	±%
Labour	Alan Smith	1,399	71.9	+1.6
Conservative	Matthew Green	390	20.1	−1.4
Liberal Democrats	Eileen Birch	156	8.0	−0.2
Majority		1,009	51.8	+3.0
Turnout		1,945	23.6	+2.2
Labour hold		Swing		

Fallings Park
Party	Candidate	Votes	%	±%
Labour	Geoffrey Foster	1,302	49.8	+0.9
Conservative	Kenneth Hodges	1,033	39.5	+1.3
Liberal Democrats	Anthony Bourke	278	10.6	−2.3
Majority		269	10.3	−0.4
Turnout		2,613	31.9	+1.9
Labour hold		Swing		

Graiseley
Party	Candidate	Votes	%	±%
Conservative	John Mellor	1,934	48.2	+12.6
Labour	Louise Miles	1,916	47.7	−4.0
Liberal Democrats	Mary Millar	166	4.1	−5.0
Majority		18	0.5	
Turnout		4,016	43.6	+5.8
Conservative hold		Swing		

Heath Town
Party	Candidate	Votes	%	±%
Labour	Malkinderpal Jaspal	914	48.8	−11.9
Liberal	Colin Hallmark	658	35.1	+9.5
Conservative	Brenda Wilson	300	16.0	+2.3
Majority		256	13.7	−21.4
Turnout		1,872	23.3	−2.0
Labour hold		Swing		

Low Hill
Party	Candidate	Votes	%	±%
Labour	Peter O'Neill	1,158	72.3	+5.9
Conservative	Paul Cook	336	21.0	−1.7
Liberal Democrats	John Stocking	108	6.7	−4.1
Majority		822	51.3	+7.6
Turnout		1,602	18.2	−0.6
Labour hold		Swing		

Merry Hill
Party	Candidate	Votes	%	±%
Conservative	Wayne Lawley	1,848	57.0	+1.7
Labour	Carl Smith	1,059	32.7	+1.2
Liberal Democrats	William Beard	333	10.3	−2.9
Majority		789	24.3	+0.5
Turnout		3,240	33.9	+1.0
Conservative gain from Labour		Swing		

Oxley
Party	Candidate	Votes	%	±%
Labour	Ian Brookfield	1,504	53.8	+5.8
Conservative	David Meredith	986	35.3	−2.1
Liberal Democrats	Ian Jenkins	305	10.9	−1.0
Majority		518	18.5	+7.9
Turnout		2,795	29.4	+1.7
Labour hold		Swing		

Park
Party	Candidate	Votes	%	±%
Conservative	Geoffrey Patten	1,744	45.5	−1.3
Labour	John Potts	1,712	44.6	+2.1
Liberal Democrats	Brian Lewis	381	9.9	−0.8
Majority		32	0.9	−3.4
Turnout		3,837	37.1	+1.3
Conservative gain from Labour		Swing		

Penn
Party	Candidate	Votes	%	±%
Conservative	Patricia Bradley	2,137	53.9	−1.5
Labour	Barry Thomas	1,522	38.4	+2.5
Liberal Democrats	Paul Beeston	305	7.7	−1.0
Majority		615	15.5	−4.0
Turnout		3,964	40.2	−0.7
Conservative hold		Swing		

St Peter's
Party	Candidate	Votes	%	±%
Labour	Roger Lawrence	1,906	70.9	+6.1
Liberal Democrats	Paul Hodson	448	16.7	+2.8
Conservative	Rina Nayer	336	12.5	−8.7
Majority		1,458	54.2	+10.6
Turnout		2,690	27.8	+2.8
Labour hold		Swing		

Spring Vale
Party	Candidate	Votes	%	±%
Liberal Democrats	Michael Heap	2,056	58.8	−0.5
Labour	Malcolm Thomas	1,174	33.6	−0.4
Conservative	Christopher Haynes	266	7.6	+0.9
Majority		882	25.2	−0.1
Turnout		3,496	34.8	+0.6
Liberal Democrats gain from Labour		Swing		

Tettenhall Regis
Party	Candidate	Votes	%	±%
Conservative	John Davis	1,972	64.7	+8.8
Labour	Sherbalwant Dulai	554	18.2	−0.2
Liberal Democrats	Roger Gray	522	17.1	−8.6
Majority		1,418	46.5	+16.3
Turnout		3,048	33.2	−2.0
Conservative hold		Swing		

Tettenhall Wightwick
Party	Candidate	Votes	%	±%
Conservative	Joan Stevenson	2,511	72.8	+0.8
Labour	Patricia Wesley	672	19.5	+0.1
Liberal Democrats	Philip Bennett	264	7.7	−1.0
Majority		1,839	53.3	+0.7
Turnout		3,447	37.6	+0.9
Conservative hold		Swing		

Wednesfield North
Party	Candidate	Votes	%	±%
Labour	Gwendoline Stafford-Good	1,392	52.1	−1.4
Conservative	David Jack	989	37.0	−1.6
Liberal Democrats	Carole Jenkins	174	6.5	+2.4
Liberal	Kate Hallmark	119	4.5	+0.7
Majority		403	15.1	+0.2
Turnout		2,674	29.5	−2.9
Labour hold		Swing		

Wednesfield South
Party	Candidate	Votes	%	±%
Labour	Paul Kalinauckas	1,341	48.0	−1.2
Conservative	Simon Jevon	1,291	46.2	+3.8
Liberal Democrats	John Steatham	162	5.8	−2.5
Majority		50	1.8	−5.0
Turnout		2,794	31.5	+0.6
Labour hold		Swing		
