= Castlecroft =

Suburb in the West Midlands, England

Coordinates: 52.5770°N 2.1832°W

- Location within the West Midlands
- Population: 1,869 (2001 Census)
- Metropolitan borough: Wolverhampton
- Metropolitan county: West Midlands
- Region: West Midlands
- Country: England
- Sovereign state: United Kingdom
- Post town: Wolverhampton
- Postcode district: WV3
- Dialling code: 01902
- Police: West Midlands
- Fire: West Midlands
- Ambulance: West Midlands
- UK Parliament: Wolverhampton West

Castlecroft is a suburb of Wolverhampton, West Midlands, located on the edge of the city, WSW of the city centre. It is situated where the Merry Hill, and Tettenhall Wightwick wards meet, and also borders South Staffordshire.

== History ==
The name Castlecroft is derived from Castlecroft House, a large house and former hotel that was converted into flats in 2004/2005.

== Demography ==
The plurality (23%) of Castlecroft's population is aged between 25 and 44. 16.3% of Castlecroft's population is aged over 75, compared with just 7.8% for Wolverhampton as a whole. The majority of people in Castlecroft (82.2%) classify their religion as Christian.

== Housing and amenities ==
It has two distinct estates, divided by a former railway line. The eastern part is mostly 1930s private housing, the western part mostly 1950s council housing. There are several houses in the area, notably Castlecroft Gardens, constructed by Major Kenneth Hutchinson Smith from reclaimed bricks and timber.

Smestow Academy and Castlecroft Primary school are located here. Bhylls Acre Primary school is also in the area, but thanks to historical accident, it falls under the jurisdiction of Staffordshire County Council.

Castlecroft has a shopping arcade at Windmill Lane, as well as The Firs pub.

== Sport ==
A.F.C. Wulfrunians football club, an association football club who currently play in the Midland Football League, are based here, at the Castlecroft Stadium. Wolverhampton Rugby Union Football Club and Wolves Women are also based at the same location.

== See also ==
- Listed buildings in Lower Penn
