= 1976 Wolverhampton Metropolitan Borough Council election =

1976 UK local government election

The 1976 Wolverhampton Metropolitan Borough Council election for the City of Wolverhampton Council in Wolverhampton, England, was held on 6 May.

The Labour Party retained control of the council.

The composition of the council prior to the election was:

- Labour 38
- Conservative 21
- Wolverhampton Association of Ratepayers 1

The composition of the council following the election was:

- Labour 34
- Conservative 24
- Wolverhampton Association of Ratepayers 2

== Ward results ==
Bilston East
Party	Candidate	Votes	%	±%
Labour	T H Larkin	1422		
Conservative	W Allen	381		
WAR	T Smith	158		
Liberal	T Snell	155		
Majority		1041		
Labour hold		Swing		

Bilston North
Party	Candidate	Votes	%	±%
Conservative	E Mears	1458		
Labour	R Reynolds	1124		
Liberal	W Leach	243		
WAR	F Cooper	227		
Majority		334		
Conservative gain from Labour		Swing		

Blakenhall
Party	Candidate	Votes	%	±%
Conservative	Mrs J E Shore	1899		
Labour	E Pritchard	1296		
WAR	R Hamp	604		
National Front	J Eyre	346		
Liberal	Mrs R Buckingham	144		
Majority		603		
Conservative hold		Swing		

Bushbury
Party	Candidate	Votes	%	±%
Labour	J Bird	1121		
Conservative	J Bussey	934		
WAR	C Raynolds	785		
Majority		187		
Labour hold		Swing		

Eastfield
Party	Candidate	Votes	%	±%
Labour	F Smith	1121		
Conservative	Mrs R Smith	679		
WAR	Mrs F Gunter	459		
National Front	R Davison	349		
Communist	Dr G Barnsby	37		
Majority		442		
Labour hold		Swing		

Ettingshall
Party	Candidate	Votes	%	±%
Labour	Mrs C Durham	928		
Conservative	M Fleming	638		
WAR	Mrs P Shelton	201		
Liberal	Mrs S Snell	103		
Majority		290		
Labour hold		Swing		

Graiseley
Party	Candidate	Votes	%	±%
Labour	Mrs V A Fletcher	1759		
Conservative	R Dorsett	1403		
WAR	A Powell	235		
Majority		356		
Labour hold		Swing		

Low Hill
Party	Candidate	Votes	%	±%
Labour	R Garner	915		
Conservative	Mrs I Bickley	607		
WAR	A Shelton	450		
Majority		308		
Labour hold		Swing		

Merry Hill
Party	Candidate	Votes	%	±%
Conservative	J Blackburn	3165		
WAR	S Smith	1658		
Labour	N Docherty	884		
National Front	G Oldland	269		
Majority		1507		
Conservative hold		Swing		

Oxley
Party	Candidate	Votes	%	±%
WAR	Mrs H Reynolds	1807		
Conservative	F Haley	1114		
Labour	R Haynes	928		
Majority		693		

WAR gain from Labour

Park
Party	Candidate	Votes	%	±%
Conservative	Mrs M S Machin	2043		
Labour	R Jones	643		
Liberal	R Gray	486		
WAR	C Dunning	273		
National Front	J Thomas	180		
Majority		1400		
Conservative hold		Swing		

Parkfield
Party	Candidate	Votes	%	±%
Labour	E Lane	1463		
Conservative	P Cope	694		
National Front	Mrs C Simpson	207		
WAR	B Read	125		
Liberal	Mrs C Sweet	42		
Communist	A Barr	17		
Majority		769		
Labour hold		Swing		

Penn
Party	Candidate	Votes	%	±%
Conservative	A Hart	3166		
WAR	F Slater	1210		
Labour	F Ledsham	461		
Liberal	F Hemsley	360		
Majority		1956		
Conservative hold		Swing		

St Peters
Party	Candidate	Votes	%	±%
Labour	M James	1911		
Conservative	Mrs G Hodson	972		
WAR	C Crane	214		
Majority		939		
Labour hold		Swing		

Spring Vale
Party	Candidate	Votes	%	±%
Labour	N G Davies	1661		
Conservative	C Barber	1084		
National Front	E Shaw	879		
Liberal	B Batchelor	341		
WAR	Mrs J Slater	287		
Majority		577		
Labour hold		Swing		

Tettenhall Regis
Party	Candidate	Votes	%	±%
Conservative	Mrs D M Seiboth	2079		
WAR	L Birch	1881		
Labour	J Tuck	296		
Liberal	L Maclean	291		
Majority		198		
Conservative hold		Swing		

Tettenhall Wightwick
Party	Candidate	Votes	%	±%
Conservative	P Snell	2710		
WAR	J Green	958		
Labour	I Turner	441		
Liberal	Mrs M Millar	208		
Majority		1752		
Conservative hold		Swing		

Wednesfield Heath
Party	Candidate	Votes	%	±%
Conservative	F Wadsworth	1763		
Labour	Dr P Young	1063		
WAR	G Evans	611		
Liberal	A Dawson	318		
National Front	Mrs C Thomas	279		
Majority		700		
Conservative gain from Labour		Swing		

Wednesfield North
Party	Candidate	Votes	%	±%
Labour	R Davies	1430		
Conservative	R Squires	1426		
WAR	M Pearson	858		
National Front	Mrs M McNally	382		
Majority		4		
Labour hold		Swing		

Wednesfield South
Party	Candidate	Votes	%	±%
Conservative	J Curtiss	1705		
Labour	J F Torrington	1273		
Majority		432		
Conservative gain from Labour		Swing		
