= 1983 Wolverhampton Metropolitan Borough Council election =

1983 UK local government election

The 1983 Council elections held in Wolverhampton on Thursday 5 May 1983 were one third, and 20 of the 60 seats were up for election.

During the 1983 election the Conservatives gained the Bushbury seat from Labour whilst Labour gained the Wednesfield South from the Conservatives, leaving the overall constitution unchanged and Labour as the controlling group.

Prior to the election the constitution of the Council was:

- Labour 34
- Conservative 26

Following the election the constitution of the Council was:

- Labour 34
- Conservative 26

== Ward results ==
Bilston East
Party	Candidate	Votes	%	±%
Labour	J Geraghty	2021		
Conservative	A Lewis	536		
Alliance	Mrs J Gladstone	426		
Majority		1485		

Bilston North
Party	Candidate	Votes	%	±%
Labour	N Dougherty	1756		
Conservative	R Green	1503		
Alliance	G Carter	1001		
Majority		253		

Blakenhall
Party	Candidate	Votes	%	±%
Labour	R Reynolds	2192		
Conservative	A Nelson	1631		
Alliance	Mrs G Hammond	409		
Majority		561		

Bushbury
Party	Candidate	Votes	%	±%
Conservative	P Turley	1860		
Labour	S S Gangar	949		
Alliance	I Jenkins	767		
Majority		911		

East Park
Party	Candidate	Votes	%	±%
Labour	A Steventon	2046		
Conservative	J Rixson	736		
Alliance	J White	371		
Communist	P Hodson	35		
Majority		1310		

Ettingshall
Party	Candidate	Votes	%	±%
Labour	P Richards	1909		
Conservative	M Hutt	583		
Alliance	Mrs A Whitehouse	329		
Majority		1326		

Fallings Park
Party	Candidate	Votes	%	±%
Conservative	H Turner	1945		
Labour	Mrs T Walton	1920		
Alliance	P Fisher	464		
Majority		25		

Graiseley
Party	Candidate	Votes	%	±%
Labour	Mrs M Chevannes	2259		
Conservative	Mrs K Dass	1875		
Alliance	N T S Khalsa	738		
Majority		384		

Heath Town
Party	Candidate	Votes	%	±%
Labour	B Dass	1221		
Conservative	J Margetts	954		
Residents	W Garbett	822		
Alliance	C Hallmark	596		
Majority		267		

Low Hill
Party	Candidate	Votes	%	±%
Labour	C Laws	2091		
Conservative	Mrs C Horton	837		
Alliance	J Thompson	394		
Majority		1254		

Merry Hill
Party	Candidate	Votes	%	±%
Conservative	R Hart	2684		
Alliance	B Lamb	1318		
Labour	Mrs A Denham	681		
Majority		1366		

Oxley
Party	Candidate	Votes	%	±%
Conservative	J Perry	1711		
Labour	J Clifford	1709		
Alliance	R Steel	358		
Majority		2		

Park
Party	Candidate	Votes	%	±%
Conservative	Mrs M Hodson	2843		
Labour	Mrs J Jones	1339		
Alliance	L Sherwin	581		
Majority		1504		

Penn
Party	Candidate	Votes	%	±%
Conservative	Mrs P Bradley	3175		
Alliance	J Nock	963		
Labour	Mrs V Winder	638		
Majority		2212		

St Peter's
Party	Candidate	Votes	%	±%
Labour	R Lawrence	2842		
Conservative	N Rooke	691		
Alliance	R Gray	450		
Communist	Dr G Barnsby	70		
Majority		2151		

Spring Vale
Party	Candidate	Votes	%	±%
Labour	A Garner	1942		
Conservative	A Rissbrook	1200		
Alliance	R Whitehouse	1152		
Majority		742		

Tettenhall Regis
Party	Candidate	Votes	%	±%
Conservative	J Davis	2393		
Alliance	L McLean	1548		
Labour	Mrs N Jones	600		
Majority		845		

Tettenhall Wightwick
Party	Candidate	Votes	%	±%
Conservative	J Inglis	2871		
Labour	B Hill	716		
Alliance	Mrs P Andrews	545		
Majority		2155		

Wednesfield North
Party	Candidate	Votes	%	±%
Labour	A Morey	1898		
Conservative	R Woodhouse	1744		
Alliance	M Pearson	684		
Majority		154		

Wednesfield South
Party	Candidate	Votes	%	±%
Labour	A McPherson	1994		
Conservative	A Griffiths	1661		
Alliance	E George	655		
Majority		333		
