= 2019 City of Wolverhampton Council election =

2019 UK local government election

The 2019 City of Wolverhampton Council election took place on 2 May 2019. It was held on the same day as other local elections.

== Ward results ==
=== Bilston East ===
Bilston East
| Party | Candidate | Votes | % | ±% |
|---|---|---|---|---|
| Labour | Rashpal Kaur | 1,045 | 50.7 | |
| UKIP | Robert Wells | 550 | 26.7 | |
| Conservative | Sian Kumar | 275 | 13.3 | |
| Independent | Tom Fellows | 191 | 9.3 | |
| Majority | | | | |
| Turnout | | 2,061 | | |
| Labour hold | | Swing | | |

=== Bilston North ===
Bilston North
| Party | Candidate | Votes | % | ±% |
|---|---|---|---|---|
| Labour Co-op | Olivia Birch | 1,216 | 58.6 | |
| UKIP | Brian Lawley | 540 | 26.0 | |
| Conservative | Mohammed Sohaib | 318 | 15.3 | |
| Majority | | | | |
| Turnout | | 2,074 | | |
| Labour Co-op hold | | Swing | | |

=== Blakenhall ===
Blakenhall
| Party | Candidate | Votes | % | ±% |
|---|---|---|---|---|
| Labour | Paul Birch | 2,221 | 79.0 | |
| Conservative | Josh Moreton | 335 | 11.9 | |
| UKIP | Christopher Gleve | 142 | 5.0 | |
| Liberal Democrats | Patrick Bentley | 115 | 4.1 | |
| Majority | | | | |
| Turnout | | 2,813 | | |
| Labour hold | | Swing | | |

=== Bushbury North ===
Bushbury North
| Party | Candidate | Votes | % | ±% |
|---|---|---|---|---|
| Conservative | Paul Appleby | 795 | 33.8 | |
| Labour | Wayne O'Brien | 787 | 33.5 | |
| UKIP | John Rickhuss | 515 | 21.9 | |
| Green | Michelle Webster | 134 | 5.7 | |
| Liberal Democrats | Ann Jenkins | 118 | 5.0 | |
| Majority | | | | |
| Turnout | | 2,349 | | |
| Conservative gain from Labour | | Swing | | |

=== Bushbury South and Low Hill ===
Bushbury South and Low Hill
| Party | Candidate | Votes | % | ±% |
|---|---|---|---|---|
| Labour | Paula Brookfield | 1,067 | 61.6 | |
| Conservative | Robert Hornsby | 331 | 19.1 | |
| Green | Clive Wood | 209 | 12.1 | |
| Liberal Democrats | Alan Bamber | 126 | 7.3 | |
| Majority | | | | |
| Turnout | | 1,733 | | |
| Labour hold | | Swing | | |

=== East Park ===
East Park
| Party | Candidate | Votes | % | ±% |
|---|---|---|---|---|
| Labour | Harman Banger | 1,013 | 59.3 | |
| Independent | Steve Hall | 395 | 23.1 | |
| Conservative | Andrew Timmins | 299 | 17.5 | |
| Majority | | | | |
| Turnout | | 1,707 | | |
| Labour hold | | Swing | | |

=== Ettingshall ===
Ettingshall
| Party | Candidate | Votes | % | ±% |
|---|---|---|---|---|
| Labour | Sandra Samuels | 2,005 | 75.8 | |
| Liberal Democrats | David Murray | 347 | 13.1 | |
| Conservative | Fortune Sibanda | 292 | 11.0 | |
| Majority | | | | |
| Turnout | | 2,644 | | |
| Labour hold | | Swing | | |

=== Fallings Park ===
Fallings Park
| Party | Candidate | Votes | % | ±% |
|---|---|---|---|---|
| Labour | Valerie Evans | 931 | 50.0 | |
| Conservative | Ranjit Dhillon | 537 | 28.8 | |
| Green | Helen Currie | 229 | 12.3 | |
| Liberal Democrats | Peter Nixon | 165 | 8.9 | |
| Majority | | | | |
| Turnout | | 1,862 | | |
| Labour hold | | Swing | | |

=== Graiseley ===
Graiseley
| Party | Candidate | Votes | % | ±% |
|---|---|---|---|---|
| Labour Co-op | Jacqueline Sweetman | 1,630 | 65.1 | |
| Conservative | Giuliano Pisarski | 497 | 19.9 | |
| Green | Daniel Flynn | 234 | 9.3 | |
| Liberal Democrats | Joanne Taaffe | 142 | 5.7 | |
| Majority | | | | |
| Turnout | | 2,503 | | |
| Labour Co-op hold | | Swing | | |

=== Heath Town ===
Heath Town
| Party | Candidate | Votes | % | ±% |
|---|---|---|---|---|
| Labour | Milkinderpal Jaspal | 1,124 | 61.1 | |
| Conservative | Sucha Singh | 436 | 23.7 | |
| Liberal Democrats | Ian Jenkins | 281 | 15.3 | |
| Majority | | | | |
| Turnout | | 1,841 | | |
| Labour hold | | Swing | | |

=== Merry Hill ===
Merry Hill
| Party | Candidate | Votes | % | ±% |
|---|---|---|---|---|
| Conservative | Chris Haynes | 1,499 | 51.1 | |
| Labour | Paul Darke | 1,020 | 34.8 | |
| Green | Kate Gilbert | 415 | 14.1 | |
| Majority | | | | |
| Turnout | | 2,934 | | |
| Conservative hold | | Swing | | |

=== Oxley ===
Oxley
| Party | Candidate | Votes | % | ±% |
|---|---|---|---|---|
| Labour | Clare Simm | 971 | 46.1 | |
| Conservative | Andrew McNeil | 492 | 23.4 | |
| Black Country Party | Bob Southam | 320 | 15.2 | |
| Liberal Democrats | Leyla Abbes | 180 | 8.5 | |
| Green | Helen Tudor | 114 | 5.4 | |
| Socialist Alternative | Joshua Allerton | 30 | 1.4 | |
| Majority | | | | |
| Turnout | | 2,107 | | |
| Labour hold | | Swing | | |

=== Park ===
Park
| Party | Candidate | Votes | % | ±% |
|---|---|---|---|---|
| Labour Co-op | Michael Hardacre | 1,354 | 53.4 | |
| Conservative | David Davies | 651 | 25.7 | |
| Green | Amy Bertaut | 359 | 14.2 | |
| Liberal Democrats | Nicholas Machnik-Foster | 171 | 6.7 | |
| Majority | | | | |
| Turnout | | 2,535 | | |
| Labour Co-op hold | | Swing | | |

=== Penn ===
Penn
| Party | Candidate | Votes | % | ±% |
|---|---|---|---|---|
| Conservative | Paul Singh | 1,880 | 51.5 | |
| Labour | Muhammad Nasim | 1,127 | 30.9 | |
| Green | Holly Whitmill | 394 | 10.8 | |
| Liberal Democrats | Peter Hollis | 248 | 6.8 | |
| Majority | | | | |
| Turnout | | 3,649 | | |
| Conservative hold | | Swing | | |

=== Spring Vale ===
Spring Vale
| Party | Candidate | Votes | % | ±% |
|---|---|---|---|---|
| Labour | Rupinderjit Kaur | 1,105 | 55.5 | |
| Liberal Democrats | Kathryn Ball | 480 | 24.1 | |
| Conservative | Safyaan Salim | 405 | 20.4 | |
| Majority | | | | |
| Turnout | | 1,990 | | |
| Labour hold | | Swing | | |

=== St. Peter's ===
St. Peter's
| Party | Candidate | Votes | % | ±% |
|---|---|---|---|---|
| Labour | Lynne Moran | 1,391 | 76.3 | |
| Conservative | Gillian Timms | 254 | 13.9 | |
| Green | Terry Hancox | 179 | 9.8 | |
| Majority | | | | |
| Turnout | | 1,824 | | |
| Labour hold | | Swing | | |

=== Tettenhall Regis ===
Tettenhall Regis
| Party | Candidate | Votes | % | ±% |
|---|---|---|---|---|
| Conservative | Jonathan Yardley | 1,692 | 57.0 | |
| Labour | Chester Morrison | 850 | 28.6 | |
| Green | Benjamin Brunsdon | 254 | 8.6 | |
| Liberal Democrats | Julian Donald | 171 | 5.8 | |
| Majority | | | | |
| Turnout | | 2,967 | | |
| Conservative hold | | Swing | | |

=== Tettenhall Wightwick ===
Tettenhall Wightwick
| Party | Candidate | Votes | % | ±% |
|---|---|---|---|---|
| Conservative | Wendy Thompson | 2,073 | 63.5 | |
| Conservative | Jonathan Crofts | 1,997 | 61.2 | |
| Labour | Pat Cross | 754 | 23.1 | |
| Green | Andrea Cantrill | 609 | 18.7 | |
| Liberal Democrats | Bryan Lewis | 247 | 7.6 | |
| Liberal Democrats | David Marsh | 186 | 5.7 | |
| Majority | | | | |
| Turnout | | 3,312 | | |
| Conservative hold | | Swing | | |
| Conservative hold | | Swing | | |

=== Wednesfield North ===
Wednesfield North
| Party | Candidate | Votes | % | ±% |
|---|---|---|---|---|
| Labour | Rita Potter | 957 | 42.5 | |
| UKIP | Eddie Szwarc | 702 | 31.1 | |
| Conservative | Adam Collinge | 473 | 21.0 | |
| Green | Lee Harris | 122 | 5.4 | |
| Majority | | | | |
| Turnout | | 2,254 | | |
| Labour hold | | Swing | | |

=== Wednesfield South ===
Wednesfield South
| Party | Candidate | Votes | % | ±% |
|---|---|---|---|---|
| Labour | Bhupinder Gakhal | 1,063 | 43.5 | |
| Labour | Jacqui Coogan | 933 | 38.2 | |
| Conservative | Alison Webb | 675 | 27.6 | |
| Conservative | Raj Chaggar | 674 | 27.6 | |
| UKIP | Sandra Hopkins | 545 | 22.3 | |
| Green | Zak Roche | 252 | 10.3 | |
| Majority | | | | |
| Turnout | | 2,454 | | |
| Labour hold | | Swing | | |
| Labour hold | | Swing | | |
