= Spring Vale, Wolverhampton =

Coordinates: 52.553°N 2.107°W

Spring Vale
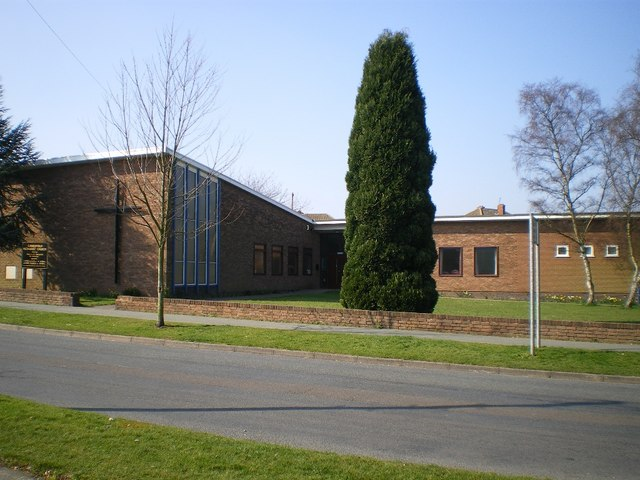
- Lanesfield Methodist Church

- Location within the West Midlands
- Metropolitan borough: Wolverhampton
- Metropolitan county: West Midlands
- Region: West Midlands
- Country: England
- Sovereign state: United Kingdom
- Police: West Midlands
- Fire: West Midlands
- Ambulance: West Midlands

Spring Vale is a district and former ward of Wolverhampton City Council, West Midlands, England. It is situated SSE of the city centre, on the city's border with the Metropolitan Borough of Dudley. The population of the ward at the 2011 census was 12,243.

It now forms a part of the Ettingshall South and Spring Vale ward, the new boundaries taking effect from the May 2023 Council elections.

== Geography ==
As well as Dudley, Spring Vale borders the Blakenhall, Ettingshall and Bilston East wards, and forms part of the Wolverhampton South East constituency. It contains the suburbs of Ettingshall Park, Woodcross (which is actually part of the Bilston township) and Lanesfield.

== History ==
The area has seen some regeneration in recent years, as a result of the closure of the Bilston Steel Works in 1979 by British Steel Corporation. The works were a major employer for the area and the location where the first Bessemer blast furnace was installed, which allowed the invention of Tarmac using burnt coal residue. The closure resulted in the loss of 2,000 jobs and significant damage to the local economy.

== Places of interest ==
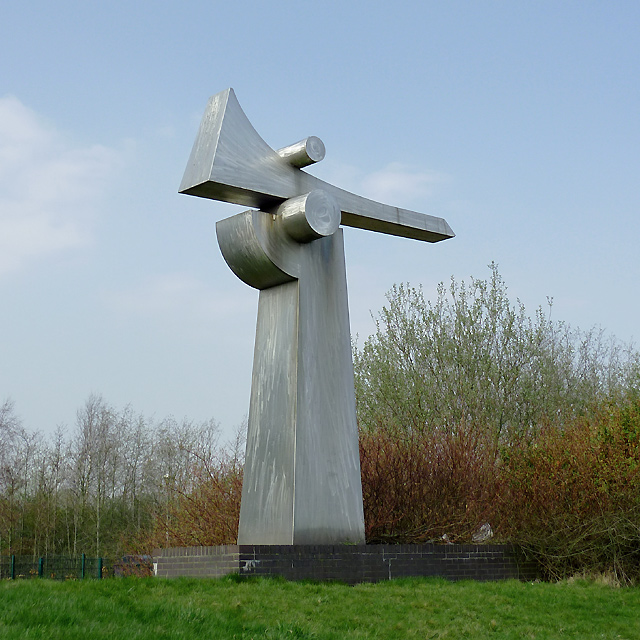
'Roll Down' by Robert Erskine

In 1994, Blue Lamp and Tarmac Industries developed the land building Springvale Retail Park, providing new employment. In 1995, Blue Lamp Business Parks Ltd. commissioned a landmark sculpture called 'Roll Down', designed and created by sculptor Robert Erskine FRSS. 'Roll Down' stands on the exact location of where the number 1 Bessemer Blast Furnace, known as Elizabeth to the steel workers, was sited. At a height of 45 feet (14 m) and 18.5 feet (6 m) wide, 'Roll Down' is made of wrought stainless steel. It was nominated for the Anderson Sculpture Prize. The sculpture was unveiled on 19 October 1994 by Labour MP Dennis Turner, who had worked as a steelman at the Elizabeth blast furnace. Past steel workers were invited to the ceremony and reception. 250 children from the adjacent Springvale Primary school buried memory capsules beneath the sculpture. This was after a tour organised by Robert Erskine to the works in Derby where he was creating 'Roll Down', and involved the children in the project. The capsules contain stories of the children's families experiencing unemployment, but also messages of thought for the future. Many children provided artifacts and objects from their relatives, which in time will be revealed and preserved for future generations. 'Roll Down' is designed to last a minimum of 500 years.

Also located in the area is Spring Vale Library on Bevan Avenue.

== See also ==
- City of Wolverhampton Council elections
