= St Peter's (Wolverhampton ward) =

Coordinates: 52.587°N 2.129°W

St Peter's is a ward of Wolverhampton City Council, West Midlands. It has two parts: the city centre (i.e. the area inside the city's Ring Road), and the inner-city areas immediately to the north and north-west, including Dunstall Hill and part of Whitmore Reans.

It is bordered by the wards of Bushbury South and Low Hill, Heath Town, East Park, Ettingshall, Blakenhall, Graiseley, Park, Tettenhall Regis and Oxley. It forms part of the Wolverhampton West constituency.

The city centre includes the main shopping centres: the Mander Centre (named after the Mander family whose paint factory once stood on the site) and Wulfrun Centre), the Civic Centre (the headquarters of the city council), the main campus of the University of Wolverhampton and the terminus of the West Midlands Metro. St Peter's Church is in that part of the ward: it is the principal Anglican church in the city, and gives the ward its name.

The rest of the ward includes the Molineux Stadium (home of Wolverhampton Wanderers F.C.), further parts of the University, and Dunstall Park (the city's horse racing course).

== See also ==
City of Wolverhampton Council elections
