= Tettenhall Wightwick (ward) =

Electoral ward of Wolverhampton City Council

Coordinates: 52.582°N 2.184°W

Tettenhall Wightwick is a ward of Wolverhampton City Council, West Midlands. The population of this ward taken at the 2011 census was 10,872.

== Geography ==
It is one of two wards covering the Tettenhall area, the other being Tettenhall Regis. It is situated on the western edge of the city, bordering South Staffordshire and the Tettenhall Regis, Park and Merry Hill wards. It forms part of the Wolverhampton West constituency.

As well as the southern part of Tettenhall, it covers the suburbs of Compton, Tettenhall Wood and Wightwick, and parts of Castlecroft and Finchfield.

== Education ==
The ward is home to Tettenhall College, Smestow Academy and a number of primary schools.

== Architecture ==
The ward contains some interesting architecture such as The Mount, now a hotel which was a home of the Mander family and was the location where David Lloyd George called the "Coupon" General Election. Round the corner from the Mount is Wightwick Manor, built in the arts and crafts style and one of the earliest houses to be given to the National Trust. A house bordering the ward but actually in South Staffordshire is Wightwick Hall (now a special school), which was formerly the home of Sir Alfred Hickman MP, the founder of Tarmac. There were several notable houses in this vicinity that were demolished in the 1960s and 1970s, including the Gothic-style Perton Grove, built by the Underhill family. In the Tettenhall end of the ward is Tettenhall Towers, now home to Tettenhall College but once home to an eccentric ironmaster called Colonel Thorneycroft.

== See also ==
- City of Wolverhampton Council elections
