= Bilston North (ward) =

Coordinates: 52.572°N 2.073°W

Bilston North is a ward of City of Wolverhampton Council, West Midlands. As its name suggests, it covers the northern parts of the town of Bilston, such as Bunkers Hill, Portobello. It borders the Bilston South, Ettingshall North and East Park wards, and the Metropolitan Borough of Walsall. It forms part of the Wolverhampton South East constituency.

The Bilston campus of the City of Wolverhampton College and Moseley Park Secondary School are situated in the ward.

== See also ==
- City of Wolverhampton Council elections
