= Tettenhall Regis (ward) =

Electoral ward of Wolverhampton City Council

Coordinates: 52.602°N 2.17°W

Tettenhall Regis is a ward of Wolverhampton City Council, West Midlands. The population of this ward at the 2011 census was 11,911.

== Geography ==
The modern ward of Tettenhall Regis is one of two covering the Tettenhall area, the other being Tettenhall Wightwick. It is situated on the western edge of the city, bordering South Staffordshire and the Oxley, St Peter's, Park and Tettenhall Wightwick wards. It forms part of the Wolverhampton West constituency.

As well as the northern part of Tettenhall, it covers the suburbs of Aldersley and Claregate.

== Name ==
Historically, Tettenhall parish was divided into two manors, Tettenhall Regis ("Tettenhall of the king") and Tettenhall Clericorum ("Tettenhall of the clergy"). Likewise, the smaller prebend of Tettenhall was divided into two constablewicks called Tettenhall Regis and Tettenhall Clericorum.

== Architecture ==
The ward contain some interesting architecture including the Clifton Road conservation area. Woodthorne, once the home of Lord Wolverhampton, has long since been demolished and its site is now used by DEFRA. The Church of St. Michael on Lower Green was a medieval church (and formerly a Royal Free Chapel) that was badly damaged by a fire in the 1950s and rebuilt in the Gothic style.

== Places of interest ==
The A41 runs through the western area of the ward, this section of A41 "Holyhead Road" was designed by Thomas Telford who organised blasting through Tettenhall Rock. Adjacent to the A41 is Tettenhall Green which was gifted to Tettenhall Parish Council by a Miss Jenks, the Green contains Tettenhall pool (a well known local paddling pool). Adjacent to Tettenhall Green is Wolverhampton Cricket Club and also nearby is the South Staffordshire Golf Club.

== Education ==
The ward is home to Aldersley and The King's secondary schools and a number of primary schools.

== See also ==
City of Wolverhampton Council elections
