= Park (Wolverhampton ward) =

Coordinates: 52.583°N 2.155°W

Park, or Park Ward, is a ward of Wolverhampton City Council, West Midlands. It is located to the west of the city centre, and covers parts of the suburbs Bradmore, Compton, Finchfield, Merridale, Newbridge and Whitmore Reans. It borders the St Peter's, Graiseley, Merry Hill, Tettenhall Wightwick and Tettenhall Regis wards. It forms part of the Wolverhampton West constituency.

== Geography ==
Its name comes from the fact that two of the city's main parks, West Park and Bantock Park, lie within its boundaries. Two of the city's main thoroughfares are contained largely within the ward, namely the A41 Tettenhall Road and the Compton Road (A454).

The Halfway House on Tettenhall Road was formerly a coaching house on the London to Holyhead route and as the name suggests, was the halfway point. It was a pub for many years but closed (2009) to reopen as a pharmacy.

== Main sights ==
Park contains the Chapel Ash conservation area and also the Parkdale conservation area. Some other interesting architecture can be seen within the ward, particularly on the Tettenhall Road, such as first Mayor of Wolverhampton, George Thorneycroft's House.

== Economy ==
The ward contains the Marstons Park Brewery, one of the city's main employers. Other employers in the ward tend to be office or school based but there are also a number of well-known pubs and restaurants. The city's now closed Eye Infirmary was located at the top of Compton Road in Chapel Ash. The site began redevelopment in 2023 and plans to provide new housing and employment.

== Education ==
Also inside Park ward are a number of schools, including Wolverhampton Grammar School, Wolverhampton Girls' High School, St Peter's Collegiate Academy and St Edmund's Catholic Academy, as well as numerous Primary schools. The Compton campus of the University of Wolverhampton is there, as is the Paget Road campus of the City of Wolverhampton College.

== See also ==
City of Wolverhampton Council elections
