= Oxley, Wolverhampton =

Suburb of Wolverhampton, England

Coordinates: 52.614°N 2.133°W

Oxley
- Location within the West Midlands
- Population: 12,797 (2011.Ward Census)
- Metropolitan borough: City of Wolverhampton
- Metropolitan county: West Midlands
- Region: West Midlands
- Country: England
- Sovereign state: United Kingdom
- Post town: Wolverhampton
- Postcode district: WV
- Dialling code: 01902
- Police: West Midlands
- Fire: West Midlands
- Ambulance: West Midlands
- UK Parliament: Wolverhampton West

Oxley is a suburb of Wolverhampton, West Midlands, and a ward of the City of Wolverhampton Council. Its area code is WV10. It is situated in the north of the city, bordering South Staffordshire and the Bushbury North, Bushbury South and Low Hill, St Peter's and Tettenhall Regis wards. It forms part of the Wolverhampton West constituency.

== Name and origins ==
The place name Oxley has its origins in the Old English language. 'Ox' from old English 'Oxa' (for the animal), and 'Ley' from the old English 'lēah' (recorded in the Domesday Book by the Normans as 'Oxelie'), meaning woodland clearing or meadow. The majority of Wolverhampton's place names are old English (Anglo-Saxon) in origin, and at that time, much of the land was covered in woodland. Cannock forest stretched down through Wolverhampton and would have encompassed the Oxley area – so the name means a clearing in the woodland with the presence of oxen.

Up until the 20th century, Oxley was very much a rural area, sitting on the route of the Wolverhampton to Stafford road.

== Transport ==
The borough's western border is also the location of Autherley Junction, where the Shropshire Union Canal meets the Staffordshire & Worcestershire Canal, and of Aldersley Junction, where the BCN Main Line meets the Staffordshire & Worcestershire Canal.

The mainline of the former Shrewsbury and Birmingham Railway (S&BR) transits the area. In 1907, the Great Western Railway developed a railway depot at Oxley, to replace the existing S&BR shed at Wolverhampton railway works. A standard two-turntable shed, it housed nearly 100 locomotives, mainly freight types for servicing the co-located major freight yard. After allocation to British Railways London Midland Region in January 1963, it closed the dilapidated Wolverhampton (Stafford Road) TMD, and moved all locomotives to Oxley from September 1963. The shed closed to steam locomotives from March 1967, redeveloped as a diesel maintenance facility.

In 1972 the stretch of railway between Wolverhampton North Junction and Oxley was electrified on the 25 kV overhead line AC system (using catenary designed for low-speed movements only), the first stretch of the former Great Western network to be thus treated. This enabled electric locomotives to work empty coaching stock on West Coast Main Line services from London Euston that terminated at Wolverhampton. Today Oxley TRSMD is operated by Alstom to maintain Class 390 Pendolinos for Avanti West Coast. Since 2021 Oxley TRSMD has been the home depot for Avanti West Coast Class 805 and 807s.

Oxley is well served by buses with National Express West Midlands services 3 and 4 providing a combined 7 minute service between the City Centre and Three Tuns Island. Additional services are operated by Select Bus Service on service 877/878 which runs to Brewood and occasionally to Stafford.

== Modern times ==
The focal point of Oxley is the Three Tuns Parade, a shopping area on the A449 Stafford Road, adjacent to the boundary with Bushbury North. Principal local landmarks include the two towering railway viaducts crossing the Birmingham Canal Navigations Main Line Canal. After car tyre production ceased in 2006, the Goodyear plant went into an almost complete shutdown. Its 81-year-old blue and yellow chimney stack was demolished in June 2008 as part of a regeneration and housing project. A new housing estate was built here from summer 2011 which includes an Aldi and a Hungry Horse pub named "The Gatehouse" as it sits on the site of the old Goodyear gatehouse.

The Church of the Epiphany is the Anglican parish Church on Lymer Road, the building dates to the early 1960s. Installed within the Church is a fine example of a Compton Theatre organ originally installed at the Windsor Theatre in Bearwood, Birmingham. The local Polish community has its centre and Catholic Church on Stafford Road, Oxley.

The suburb of Pendeford falls within Oxley ward. Wolverhampton Science Park is situated near Oxley's south border, on the site of the old Gas Works at Gorsebrook. Ormiston NEW Academy lies in the ward.

== Sources ==
- Canal Companion - Birmingham Canal Navigations, J. M. Pearson & Associates, 1989, ISBN 0-907864-49-X
- https://web.archive.org/web/20120305171636/http://www.wolverhampton.gov.uk/NR/rdonlyres/D608419B-8BF8-493F-89B7-204FF5C8306C/0/Oxley.pdf 2001 Census
