= Wednesfield North (ward) =

Electoral ward of Wolverhampton City Council

Coordinates: 52.615°N 2.058°W

Wednesfield North is a ward of Wolverhampton City Council, West Midlands. As the name suggests, it covers the northern parts of the town of Wednesfield. It borders the Wednesfield South, Heath Town and Fallings Park wards, as well as South Staffordshire and the Metropolitan Borough of Walsall. It forms part of the Wolverhampton North East constituency.

Most of the ward is formed from the Ashmore Park housing estate, and part of Wood End. Coppice High School is situated in the ward.

== See also ==
- City of Wolverhampton Council elections
