= Ettingshall =

Area of Wolverhampton, England

Coordinates: 52.566°N 2.101°W

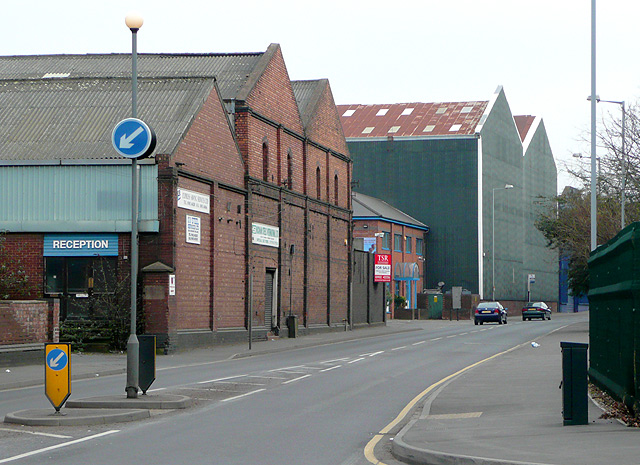
Industrial units, Millfields Road, Ettingshall

Ettingshall is an area of Wolverhampton, West Midlands, England. It lies within two wards of Wolverhampton City Council: Ettingshall North and Ettingshall South and Spring Vale. The population of Ettingshall taken at the 2011 census was 13,482.

== History ==
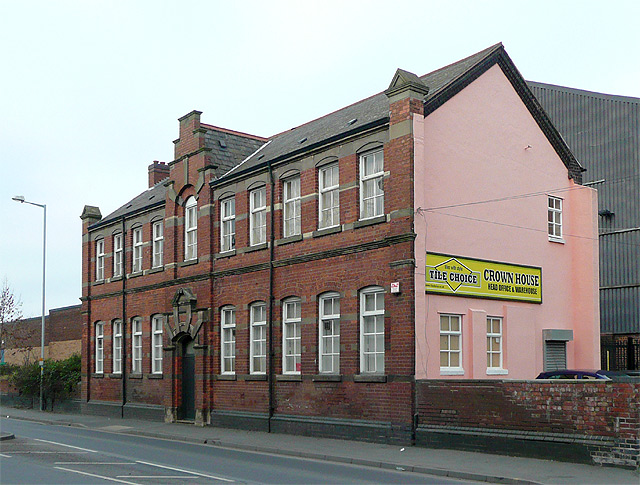
Crown House, Millfields Road

Historically part of Staffordshire, Ettingshall was mentioned as an ancient manor in the Domesday Book of 1086. The surrounding areas of Priestfield, Parkfield, Lanesfield and Millfields are believed to have been property of the manor.

From the 18th century onwards, Ettingshall became heavily industrialised as a result of the Industrial Revolution. Until April 1979, an area of wasteland on the southside of Millfields Road was the location of the Bilston Steelworks and old Bilston quarries. Ettingshall Road was the location for Cables and Instruments, Dixon's Wallcoverings and Tools and Machines. Spring Road was the location of Tarmac Limited (head office closed 2013) and John Thompson Limited (closed 2004). Ettingshall was the location for the manufacture of the 240 ton boiler drum with a length of 122 feet in 1965. This was the heaviest load carried by British Rail. It was transported to Eggborough in Yorkshire.

== Geography ==
It is situated 1¼ miles to the south-east of the city centre and centred on the A4039 and A4126 roads. It is situated on the western edge of the former Borough of Bilston and began as an expansion of the Sedgley village of Ettingshall in the Victorian era, becoming part of the new Coseley Urban District Council in 1897.

As the northern parts of the original Ettingshall extended across the border into Bilston, many new houses and factories were built and this area became known as "Ettingshall New Village", the Ettingshall that still exists in the present day.

In 1966, the bulk of the old Ettingshall village was absorbed into the borough of Wolverhampton, along with parts of Brierley village, while most of the rest of Coseley along Brierley Hill and the bulk of neighbouring Sedgley – was incorporated into an expanded Dudley borough.

Ettingshall's population grew in the early 2010s when Persimmon Homes built the Ettingshall Place estate comprising 460 new homes, housing up to 2,200 people. In 2021, a park was created in Ettingshall Place comprising a playground, basketball court, cricket practice pitch and outdoor gym equipment.

A few references to the original village in Sedgley still exist, with the Ettingshall Park Estate below the eastern slopes of Sedgley Beacon, while two roads in Coseley, Upper Ettingshall Road and Ettingshall Road still remain, their names reflecting the upper and lower parts of the extensive village.

Until 2023 Ettingshall had a single ward on Wolverhampton Council. It is now represented within two wards: Ettingshall North, which borders East Park, Bilston North, Blakenhall and St Peter's wards, and neighbouring Ettingshall South and Spring Vale ward. The new ward boundaries took effect at the May 2023 Council elections. Both wards form part of the Wolverhampton South East constituency.

== Transport ==
The West Midlands Metro tramway has two stops in the area: The Royal (named after the long-closed Royal Wolverhampton Hospital) and Priestfield.

The nearest railway station is Wolverhampton, although the area was served by Ettingshall Road on the Stour Valley Line until the station closed in 1964.

The area is well served by buses with connections to Sedgley, Wolverhampton, Willenhall and Bilston.
