= Merry Hill, Wolverhampton =

Suburb of Wolverhampton, West Midlands

Coordinates: 52.57070°N 2.17258°W

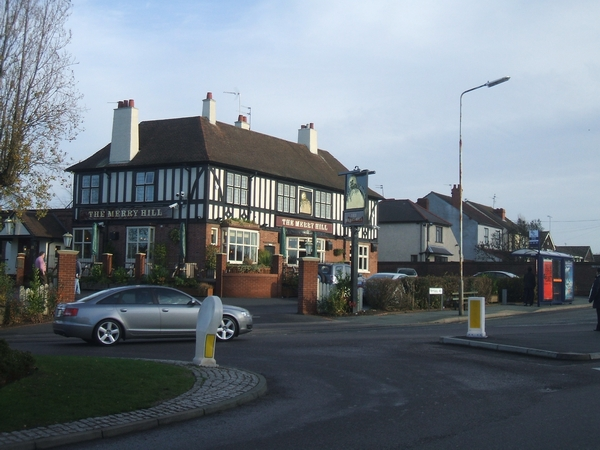
The Merry Hill public house next to roundabout and local centre in Merry Hill

Merry Hill is a suburb of Wolverhampton, West Midlands and a ward of Wolverhampton City Council. It is situated in the south-west of the city, bordering South Staffordshire and the Tettenhall Wightwick, Park, Graiseley and Penn wards. It forms part of the Wolverhampton West constituency.

Merry Hill is itself is the main focal point of the ward, situated at the junction of five main roads. Because of the layout of the ward boundaries, parts of the suburbs of Bradmore, Castlecroft and Finchfield are covered by Merry Hill ward. The population of the ward at the 2011 census was 12,189.

Highfields Secondary school, Uplands Junior school, St Michael's RC Primary school and Springdale Primary school are all situated within the ward.

Merry Hill is served by National Express West Midlands service 4 which operates daily between Spring Hill and the i54 via the city centre.

== History ==
Merry Hill once had a large house with surrounding gardens and an orchard named Bellencroft. Now demolished, it is now the location of a street named Bellencroft Gardens, with 2-3 private homes where the house once stood. The orchard of Bellencroft is now a cul-de-sac named Orchard Crescent which leads to Orchard Court.

Three multi-storey blocks of flats were erected at Merry Hill, on the edge of the Highfields estate, in 1967, where they dominated the local scene.

There is also a public house called the Merry Hill.

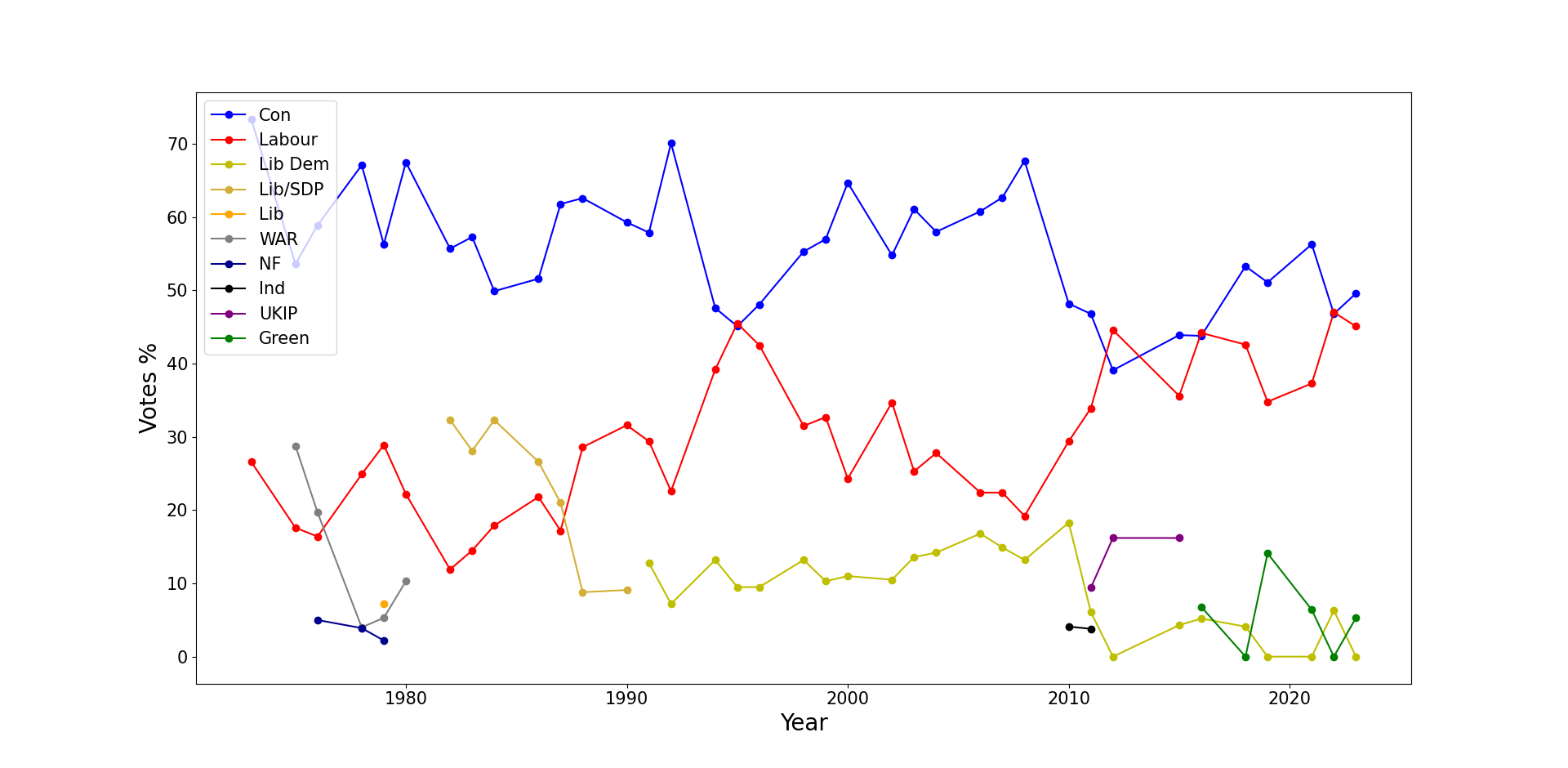
Graph of Merry Hill Local Election Vote share for parties from 1973 to 2023

Merry Hill is a ward represented by three councillors. Historically it has been a safe ward for the Conservative Party with Labour candidates regularly getting third place in the 1980s. Since 2010 it is considered to be a marginal ward between the Conservative and Labour Parties.

== See also ==
City of Wolverhampton Council elections
