= Fallings Park =

Suburb of Wolverhampton, England

Coordinates: 52°36′05″N 2°06′26″W

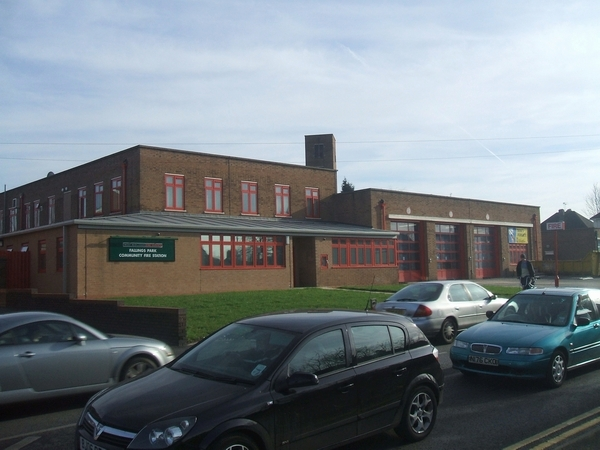
- Fallings Park Community Fire Station

- Location within the West Midlands
- Population: 12,356
- Metropolitan borough: Wolverhampton
- Metropolitan county: West Midlands
- Region: West Midlands
- Country: England
- Sovereign state: United Kingdom
- Dialling code: 01902
- Police: West Midlands
- Fire: West Midlands
- Ambulance: West Midlands

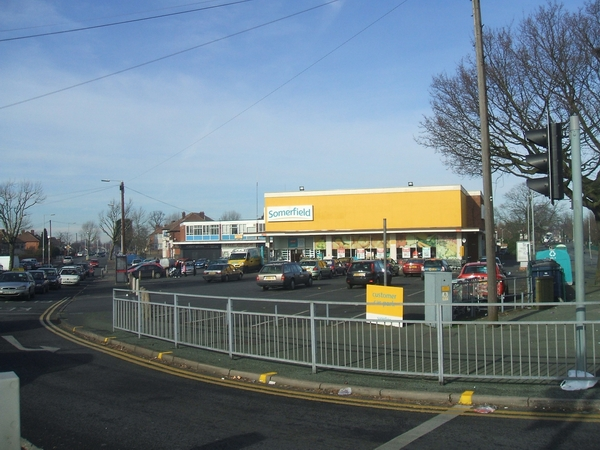
Fallings Park shopping centre

Fallings Park is a suburb of Wolverhampton, West Midlands, and a ward of Wolverhampton City Council. It is situated in the northeast of the city, bordering South Staffordshire and the Wednesfield North, Heath Town, Bushbury South and Low Hill and Bushbury North wards. It forms part of the Wolverhampton North East constituency. Fallings Park ward covers over 5,000 properties in Longknowle, Newbolds, Scotlands, Underhill and Willows.

A 50-house model housing exhibition was erected by Wolverhampton Council at Fallings Park in 1908, but the planned housing estate was never completed due to the outbreak of World War I in 1914.

== Local amenities ==
In the area there is a fire station, many shops, a petrol station, three churches, a number of primary schools (Fallings Park, D'Eyncourt, St Mary's, Long Knowle, Berrybrook and Bushbury Hill), Moreton Secondary School and two pubs, The Golden Lion and the Otter and Vixen. A third pub, the Great Horse was situated on Prestwood Road, and attracted celebrities such as former footballers Geoff Hurst and Alan Ball, as well as darts start Phil Taylor and boxer Joe Egan for charity events under former landlady, Sylvia Johnson, before closing in March 2009.

Buses services operate between Wolverhampton and the Underhill Estate. Chaserider service 70 operates between Wolverhampton and Cannock while National Express operate service 25 to Wolverhampton via Wednesfield, Willenhall and Bilston in one direction and to Pendeford in the other. On Sundays the service operates between Bilston and Pendeford only. National Express service 50 runs between Wolverhampton and Wednesfield during the off-peak serving D'Eyncourt Road and Wood End.

== History ==
The bulk of the area of Fallings Park around Wimborne Road was built in the 1930s with many of the houses retaining the World War II Air-raid shelters.
