= List of schools in Wolverhampton =

This is a list of schools in Wolverhampton, West Midlands, England.

== State-funded schools ==
=== Primary schools ===
- Bantock Primary School, Penn Fields
- Berrybrook Primary School, Scotlands
- Bilston CE Primary School, Ettingshall
- Bushbury Hill Primary School, Bushbury
- Bushbury Lane Academy, Oxley
- Castlecroft Primary School, Castlecroft
- Christ Church CE Infant School, Tettenhall Wood
- Christ Church CE Junior School, Tettenhall Wood
- Claregate Primary School, Claregate
- Corpus Christi RC Primary Academy, Ashmore Park
- D'Eyncourt Primary School, Wood Hayes
- Dovecotes Primary School, Dovecotes
- Dunstall Hill Primary School, Dunstall Hill
- East Park Academy, East Park
- Eastfield Primary School, Moseley
- Edward the Elder Primary School, Wood End
- Elston Hall Primary School, Fordhouses
- Fallings Park Primary School, Fallings Park
- Field View Primary School, Bunker's Hill
- Goldthorn Park Primary School, Goldthorn Park
- Graiseley Primary School, Graiseley
- Grove Primary Academy, All Saints
- Hill Avenue Primary School, Lanesfield
- Holy Rosary RC Primary Academy, Monmore Green
- Holy Trinity RC Primary School, The Lunt
- Lanesfield Primary School, Lanesfield
- Long Knowle Primary School, Wood Hayes
- Loxdale Primary School, Parkfields
- Manor Primary School, Woodcross
- Merridale Primary School, Merridale
- Nishkam Primary School, Merridale
- Northwood Park Primary School, Bushbury
- Oak Meadow Primary School, Ashmore Park
- Palmers Cross Primary School, Tettenhall
- Parkfield Primary School, Parkfields
- Perry Hall Primary School, Ashmore Park
- Rakegate Primary School, Oxley
- The Royal School, Blakenhall
- St Alban's CE Primary Academy, Ashmore Park
- St Andrew's CE Primary School, Whitmore Reans
- St Anthony's RC Primary Academy, Fordhouses
- St Bartholomew's CE Primary School, Penn
- St Jude's CE Primary Academy, Tettenhall
- St Luke's CE Primary School, Blakenhall
- St Martin's CE Primary School, Bradley
- St Mary's RC Primary School, Fallings Park
- St Michael's CE Primary School, Tettenhall
- St Michael's RC Primary Academy, Merry Hill
- St Patrick's RC Primary Academy, Wood End
- St Paul's CE Primary School, Pendeford
- St Stephen's CE Primary School, Heath Town
- St Teresa's RC Primary Academy, Parkfields
- St Thomas' CE Primary Academy, Wood End
- SS Mary and John's RC Primary Academy, All Saints
- SS Peter and Paul RC Primary Academy, Newbridge
- Spring Vale Primary School, Parkfields
- Springdale Primary School, Penn
- Stow Heath Primary School, Stow Heath
- Stowlawn Primary School, Stowlawn
- Trinity CE Primary Academy, Heath Town
- Uplands Junior School, Finchfield
- Villiers Primary School, Stow Heath
- Warstones Primary School, Warstones
- West Park Primary School, Whitmore Reans
- Westacre Infant School, Finchfield
- Whitgreave Primary School, Low Hill
- Wilkinson Primary School, Bradley
- Woden Primary School, Heath Town
- Wodensfield Primary School, Wood End
- Wood End Primary School, Wood End
- Woodfield Primary School, Bradmore
- Woodthorne Primary School, Tettenhall

=== Non-selective secondary schools ===
- Aldersley High School, Pendeford
- Colton Hills Community School, Goldthorn Park
- Coppice Performing Arts School, Ashmore Park
- Heath Park School, Heath Town
- Highfields School, Penn
- The Khalsa Academy, Ettingshall
- Moreton School, Bushbury
- Moseley Park School, The Lunt
- Ormiston NEW Academy, Fordhouses
- Ormiston SWB Academy, Parkfields
- Our Lady and St Chad Catholic Academy, Fallings Park
- The Royal School, Blakenhall
- St Edmund's Catholic Academy, Compton
- St Matthias School, Deansfield
- St Peter's Collegiate Academy, Compton
- St Regis Church of England Academy, Tettenhall
- Smestow Academy, Castlecroft
- Thomas Telford University Technical College, Horseley Fields
- Wednesfield Academy, Ashmore Park

=== Grammar schools ===
- Wolverhampton Girls' High School, Tettenhall

=== Special and alternative schools ===
- Broadmeadow Special School, Whitmore Reans
- The Braybrook Centre, Parkfields
- Evergreen Academy, Whitmore Reans
- Green Park School, Stowlawn
- Midpoint Centre, Parkfields
- The Orchard Centre, Parkfields
- Penn Fields School, Penn Fields
- Penn Hall School, Penn
- Pine Green Academy, Whitmore Reans
- Tettenhall Wood School, Tettenhall Wood
- Westcroft School, Scotlands
- Wolverhampton Vocational Training Centre, Ettingshall

=== Further education ===
- City of Wolverhampton College

== Independent schools ==
=== Primary and preparatory schools ===
- Newbridge Preparatory School, Newbridge

=== Senior and all-through schools ===
- Tettenhall College, Tettenhall
- Wolverhampton Grammar School, Park Dale

=== Special and alternative schools ===
- Aurora Cedars School, Compton
- Bow Street School, The Lunt
- Progress Schools - Wolverhampton, Wolverhampton City Centre
- Woodbury School, Bushbury
- WV2 Education, Blakenhall
