= List of areas in Wolverhampton =

This is a list of areas in the City of Wolverhampton local authority district in the West Midlands, England.

- Aldersley
- All Saints
- Ashmore Park
- Batmans Hill
- Bilston
- Blakeley Green
- Blakenhall
- Bradley
- Bradmore
- Bunker's Hill
- Bushbury
- Bushbury Hill
- Castlecroft
- Chapel Ash
- Cinder Hill
- Claregate
- Compton
- Deansfield
- Deepfields
- Dovecotes
- Dunstall Hill
- East Park
- Elston Hall
- Ettingshall
- Ettingshall Park
- Fallings Park
- Finchfield
- Fordhouses
- Freezeland
- Goldthorn Hill
- Goldthorn Park
- Gorsebrook
- Graiseley
- Green Lanes
- Hall Green
- Heath Town
- Horseley Fields
- Ladymoor
- Lanesfield
- Low Hill
- Lower Bradley
- Loxdale
- March End
- Merridale
- Merry Hill
- Millfields
- Monmore Green
- Moseley
- Moseley Village
- Neachells
- Newbolds
- Newbridge
- New Cross
- Nordley Hill
- Northycote
- Oakfield
- Old Fallings
- Oxbarn
- Oxley
- Palmer's Cross
- Park Dale
- Parkfield
- Park Village
- Pendeford
- Penn Fields
- Penn
- Portobello
- Priestfield
- Rough Hills
- St Chads
- Scotlands
- Springfield
- Spring Hill
- Spring Vale
- Stockwell End
- Stow Heath
- Stowlawn
- Tettenhall
- Tettenhall Wood
- The Lunt
- Underhill
- Warstones
- Wednesfield
- Wergs
- Whitmore Reans
- Wightwick
- Wolverhampton
- Wood End
- Wood Hayes
- Woodcross
