= Springfield, Wolverhampton =

Area of Wolverhampton, England

Coordinates: 52.594°N 02.115°W

Springfield
- Location within the West Midlands
- Interactive map of Springfield
- OS grid reference: SO921994
- Metropolitan borough: Wolverhampton
- Metropolitan county: West Midlands
- Region: West Midlands
- Country: England
- Sovereign state: United Kingdom
- Post town: Wolverhampton
- Postcode district: WV10 0
- Dialling code: 01902
- Police: West Midlands
- Fire: West Midlands
- Ambulance: West Midlands

Springfield is an area of Wolverhampton, England immediately north east of the city centre. It was the home of the Springfield Brewery from 1873 until 1991. The brewery site has been redeveloped by the University of Wolverhampton and serves as the campus for the university's School of Architecture and Build Environment, which includes the National Brownfield Institute. There are modern student residential blocks, one of which is the tallest structure in Wolverhampton. For local government, Springfield is within the ward of Heath Town.

== Geography ==
Springfield is divided from Wolverhampton city centre by the A4150 ring road St Patricks, the Birmingham Canal Navigations Main Line and the Wolverhampton–Shrewsbury and Rugby–Birmingham–Stafford railway lines. It lies between the A460 Cannock Road and the A4124 Wednesfield Road, and to the east borders Heath Town.

== History ==
Wolverhampton Low Level railway station was opened in 1854 and Springfield was one of the first areas of Wolverhampton east of the Oxford, Worcester & Wolverhampton railway line to be developed. By 1860 terraced housing had been built on Culwell Street, Bridge Street (now renamed Culwell Street), Field Street, Bagnal Street, Junction Street and Spring Street, the latter three of which disappeared in the 1960s following redevelopment. In 1878, Wolverhampton Council using provisions in the Artisans' and Labourers' Dwellings Improvement Act 1875 bought land and laid out streets and sewers for a planned 290 houses for people displaced from slum clearances in the town centre.

=== Springfield Brewery ===
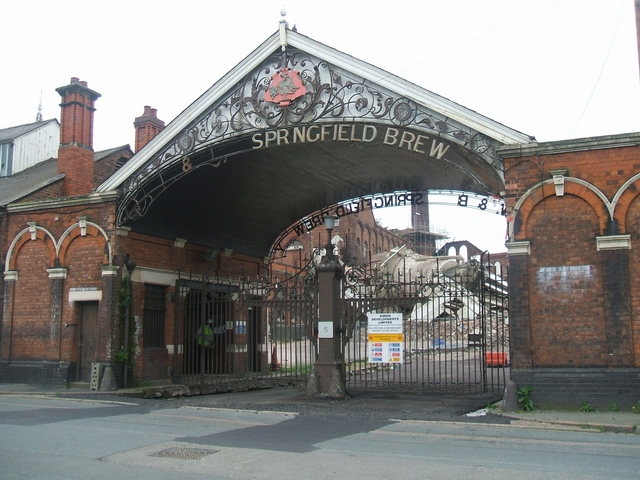
Springfield Brewery

The brewery opened in 1873 after William Butler and Company had outgrown its existing site at Priestfield in the south east of Wolverhampton. Springfield had an abundance of water from natural springs, and the land had remained undeveloped because the ground was marshy. The company acquired a seven-acre site, partly bordering Grimstone Street and built a new brewery with maltings, cooperage and stables. Production started the following year. With the new brewery close to the canal and railway lines, the company began to trade outside of the local area. The good communications also made the acquisition of public houses in other areas a viable proposition, especially when the Great Western Railway extended a siding into the site. The area of the site was extended to cope with the success of the company. Between 1881 and 1883 a new brewing tower was constructed, enabling William Butler and Company to increase production from 400 to 1,500 barrels a week. One of the beers brewed was named Springfield Bitter. In 1960 Mitchell's and Butler's acquired the company and the Cape Hill brewery but kept the Springfield Brewery open. Brewing ceased in 1991 and the main brewery building Grade II listed the same year. Thereafter the site was used simply as a distribution centre. In 2004 and 2005 fires reduced the main brewery building to a shell. Groundwork for a residential development began but was abandoned in 2008. In 2014 the site was bought by the University of Wolverhampton and Wolverhampton City Council for redevelopment.

=== Joshua Bigwood ===
Joshua Bigwood was an electrical engineering company founded in 1874. Its head office and works were on Wednesfield Road. It was taken over in 1965 by B & S Massey. Prior to its closure in 1986 the company manufactured metal forming machinery and combustion equipment and had around 85 employees. The premises have been demolished and the site redeveloped with housing on an extended Field Street.

== Government ==
Springfield is in Heath Town ward of the City of Wolverhampton and the parliamentary constituency of Wolverhampton North East. It was formerly in the Wolverhampton ward of St Mary's and Wolverhampton East parliamentary constituency.

== Landmarks ==
=== Victoria Hall student residences ===
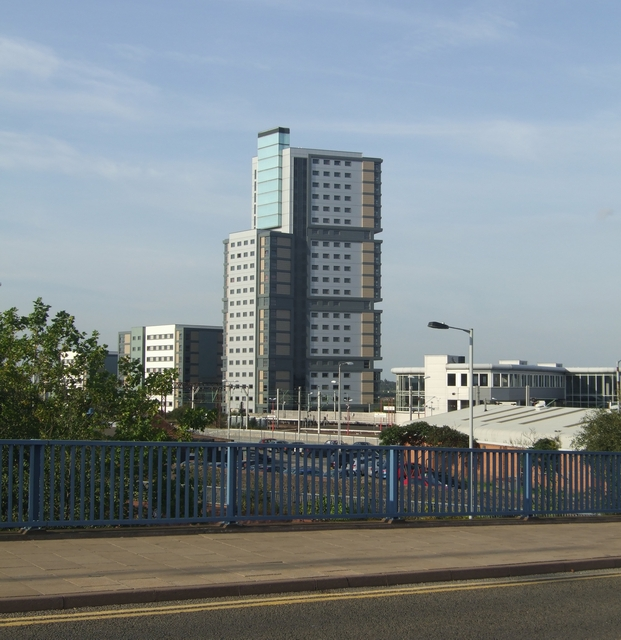
Victoria Hall, University of Wolverhampton student accommodation

Victoria Hall is a development of student accommodation for the University of Wolverhampton consisting of four tower blocks. The tallest block has 25 floors and at 77 metres (253 ft) was the highest modular building in Europe when erected in 2009. 383 modules built in Ireland were fixed together above the ground floor, each one having a structural steel frame, concrete floor, dry walls, ceiling and pre-fitted plumbing for connection, interior finishing and cabinets. The tower is the tallest building in Wolverhampton, but has been surpassed as the tallest modular building in Europe by the 135 metres (443 ft) Ten Degrees tower in Croydon.

=== University of Wolverhampton Springfield Campus ===
The 12-acre (4.9 ha) Springfield Brewery site was acquired by the University of Wolverhampton in 2014. The buildings were derelict and in a state of dilapidation. The pumphouse near the Grimstone Street entrance was the first building to be restored. West Midlands Construction University Technical College, renamed Thomas Telford University Technical College opened on the site in 2017 and The Elite Centre for Manufacturing Skills a year later in the former brewery's stable blocks. The University's School of Architecture and Built Environment relocated to Springfield in 2020. By design, the redevelopment architects left much of the surviving brickwork unrestored. The brewery courtyard has been enclosed and covered by a glass atrium and the brewery tower topped with an illuminated glazed box that replaces a steel water tank. The tower clock is an exact replica of the 1922 original. The canopied Cambridge Street gateway and surrounding stable blocks have been restored. The RIBA Journal describes the School of Architecture building's west facade as having a modern method of construction (MMC) aesthetic with repeating bays of precast concrete, red, brown and gold coloured metal cladding panels, windows of vertical louvres and a saw-tooth shaped roof. The National Brownfield Institute opened in September 2022. The Institute researches the redevelopment of brownfield land to unlock its potential for housing. The 1,900 sq.m modular building, designed by Associated Architects houses a research and innovation centre, which includes laboratories to analyse soil samples and drainage conditions. One of the Institute's assets is Spot, a robotic dog designed by Boston Dynamics fitted with scanners to scan potentially dangerous industrial land.

== Housing ==
Older terraced housing remains on Hilton Street, Springfield Road and Woden Road, and there are 1920s council-built homes in Burton Road and Burton Crescent, but otherwise houses largely date from the 1980s onwards. Since 2000, the former factory sites of Chubb and Gunnebo off Woden Road have given way to housing on Tumbler Grove and Charles Drive respectively. Likewise, the Springfield Brewery's maintenance yard, now Peterhill Close; here the original brick walls on Cambridge Road have been retained though reduced in height.

== Education ==
Woden Primary School is on Springfield Road. The site opened as Hilton Street Board School, but was soon renamed Springfield Road School. In 1931, after reorganisation it became Springfield Road Senior Boys' School. This school was attended by Johnny Nicholls in the 1940s, who went on to play professional football for West Bromwich Albion. The school was later renamed Springfield Secondary Modern Boys School and closed in 1974. The site reopened in 1977 with the transfer of the Infant and Junior sections of Woden Road School.

== Places of worship ==
St Stephen the Martyr is a Church of England congregation in the Anglo-Catholic tradition within the Diocese of Lichfield. It is associated with St Stephen’s C of E Primary School on Woden Road. The red brick and terracotta church building was built in 1907.

The New Testament Church of God, Harvest Temple is based in the former St Barnabas Church of England building on Wednesfield Road. It is affiliated to the Church of God (Cleveland, Tennessee). The fellowship originated in Stafford Street, Wolverhampton in 1953 and was the first New Testament Church of God in the United Kingdom. The Church bought the nearby Traveller's Rest public house in 1996, renamed it New Trust Centre and uses the building for community support programmes.

== Public transport ==
=== Bus ===
The main bus service provider is National Express West Midlands.

Eastbound all services terminate in Wolverhampton city centre except no. 2 which continues to Penn Fields and Warstones.

Westbound along Cannock Road: service no. 2 goes to Bushbury Hill; 11 to Underhill via Fallings Park and The Scotlands; 70 to Cannock (operated by Chaserider).

Westbound along Wednesfield Road: service no. 9 runs to Walsall via Bentley Bridge, Wednesfield, New Invention, Bloxwich, Pelsall and Rushall; 57 to Bilston via Wednesfield (operated by Diamond West Midlands); 59 to Ashmore Park via New Cross Hospital and Wednesfield; 65 to Fordhouses; 69 to Walsall via New Cross Hospital, Wood End, New Invention and Beechdale; 71 to Cannock (operated by Chaserider).

=== Rail ===
Wolverhampton railway station is immediately south west.

== Planned developments ==
In July 2021 it was announced that the site of Wolverhampton Council's Culwell Street depot and office building is set to be redeveloped. Funding from the West Midlands Combined Authority for the demolition of existing buildings and site clean-up was secured in November 2022. The development is part of a larger scheme named Brewers Yard. Outline planning permission was granted in July 2023.

== Famous residents ==
Don Howe, the footballer and football manager, was born at Springfield in 1935.
