= East Park (ward) =

Electoral ward of Wolverhampton City Council

Coordinates: 52.582°N 2.094°W

East Park is a ward of Wolverhampton City Council, West Midlands, England. It lies to the east of Wolverhampton city centre, stretching to the city's boundary with the Metropolitan Borough of Walsall. It also borders the wards of Bilston North, Ettingshall, St Peter's, Heath Town and Wednesfield South. It forms part of the Wolverhampton South East constituency.

Its name comes from East Park, a large urban park in the south of the ward. The ward also covers the Monmore Green and Deansfield areas.

== See also ==
City of Wolverhampton Council elections
