= Bradmore =

Bradmore may refer to:

- Bradmore, Nottinghamshire, Nottinghamshire, England
- Bradmore, West Midlands, Wolverhampton, West Midlands, England

== See also ==
- Bradmore Road, Oxford, England
