= Wednesfield South (ward) =

Electoral ward of Wolverhampton City Council

Coordinates: 52.600°N 2.075°W

Wednesfield South is a ward of Wolverhampton City Council, in the English Metropolitan county of the West Midlands. It covers the southern and eastern parts of the town of Wednesfield, as well its town centre. It borders the East Park, Heath Town and Wednesfield North wards, as well as the Metropolitan Borough of Walsall. It forms part of the Wolverhampton North East constituency.

The eastern part is mainly residential covering the areas of Wednesfield Village and High Street, Lyndale Park, Perry Hall, Castlebridge, Wood End, Moathouse and Broad Lane South areas while the southern part is made up of the numerous industrial estates around Neachells Lane. Wednesfield Academy is located within the ward. Central to the ward is the church of St. Thomas', this provides the focal point and landmark for Wednesfield.

== See also ==
- City of Wolverhampton Council elections
