= Penn, West Midlands =

Suburb of Wolverhampton, West Midlands County, England

Coordinates: 52.560°N 2.154°W

Penn
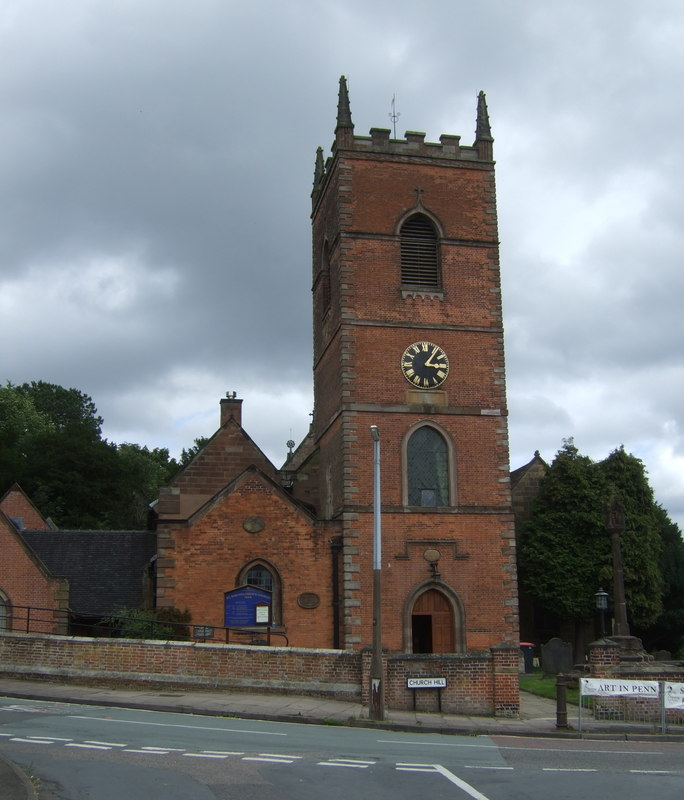
- St Bartholomew's Church

- Location within the West Midlands
- Metropolitan borough: Wolverhampton
- Metropolitan county: West Midlands
- Region: West Midlands
- Country: England
- Sovereign state: United Kingdom
- Police: West Midlands
- Fire: West Midlands
- Ambulance: West Midlands

Penn is an area divided between the City of Wolverhampton district of the West Midlands and South Staffordshire district of Staffordshire, England. The population of the Wolverhampton Ward taken at the 2011 census was 12,718. Originally, it was a village in the historic county of Staffordshire.

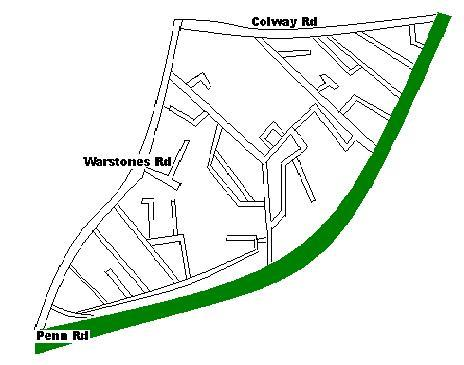
Map of West Penn (Upper Penn)

The area to the east of Penn Road (A449) and around St Bartholomew's church is referred to as Upper Penn, historically also as Penn Over. The village within South Staffordshire, and around St Anne's church is Lower Penn or Penn Under. These historic usages tend to confirm that the name has long been considered to refer to the ridge to the east, which is ascended via Church Hill, Wakeley Hill or Mount Road.

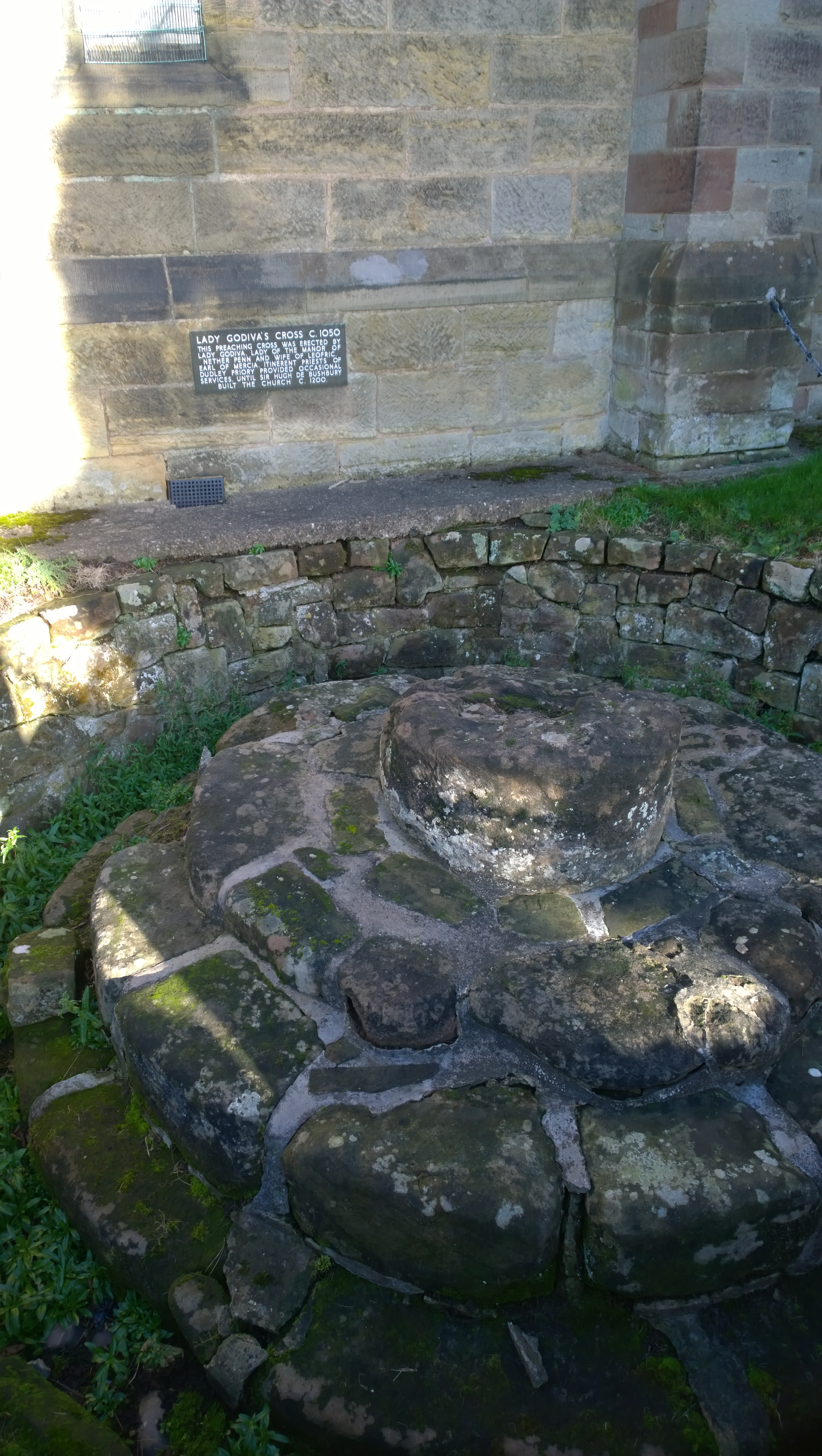
Base of a Saxon Cross at St Bartholomew's Church, Penn at the time owned by Lady Godiva

It is not clear exactly which areas fall within Penn. In 19th century censuses, Merry Hill, Bradmore were understood to form part of Penn, although these areas are generally understood to be separate today. However, the two historic settlements of Upper and Lower Penn form the core of the area.

== History ==
"Penn" is probably derived from the Welsh language, signifying a hill or promontory, and is believed to refer to the hill on which St Bartholomew's Church stands. The pre-Anglo-Saxon name may indicate relatively late survival of Celtic-speaking settlement. There was a settlement and possibly a church in Anglo-Saxon times: Domesday Book records Lower Penn as having belonged to Countess Godiva of Mercia and Upper Penn to her son, Earl Algar. In 1912, the base of an Anglo-Saxon preaching cross was discovered close to St Bartholomew's church. In fact, the name Penn suggests (but does not prove) that there was a pre-Anglo-Saxon settlement, with possible survival of Celtic language and culture locally into the Anglo-Saxon period.

The Norman conquest of England brought a major shift in land ownership. The Penn area, along with a wide tract of Mercia, was assigned by William the Conqueror to Ansculf de Picquigny, who built a motte and bailey fortress at Dudley. By 1087, the time of Domesday Book, the Penn area belonged to Ansculf's son, William Fitz-Ansculf. He had installed in Upper Penn a tenant called Robert, who also held lands from him in Bushbury, Ettingshall, Moseley and Oxley. The settlement had eight villagers and two smallholders. In Lower Penn, which had only 6 villagers with one freeman, he had another tenant, called Gilbert. Clearly both places were still mere hamlets.

Penn has had a church since at least around 1200 when St. John the Baptist's Church was first established by Sir Hugh de Bushbury, apparently a descendant of the tenant Robert. The provision of a sizeable church suggests that Upper Penn, at least, had expanded considerably by this time, in line with a general growth of population and prosperity that began in the late 12th century. Hugh gave all the tithes from Upper Penn to the support of the church, making the holder of the living a Rector. The first incumbent was John of Wolverhampton. Around 1228, the founder's son, also Sir Hugh de Bushbury, married his cousin. As this match fell within the bounds of consanguinity he was forced to bribe the Bishop of Coventry and Lichfield with the living of Penn. This did not stop the Bushbury family trying to reassert their control in later generations, although the bishops ultimately managed to retain their authority over appointments. The dedication of the church was later changed to St Bartholomew, but it is unclear when the name was changed: it is not attested before the 19th century. Some of the original fabric survives, but the present, mainly brick, building is largely the result of major restorations and enlargements in 1765, 1799 and 1845.

By the mid-12th century, Lower Penn was in the hands of the Buffery or Buffor family, who held it until the mid-15th century. It was sometimes called Penn Buffor.

Penn's growth in the Middle Ages was probably driven by its position on a major route, connecting not just the local towns of Wolverhampton, Stourbridge and Kidderminster, but the county towns of Stafford and Worcester, and forming part of the main north–south route of Western England. Traffic struggled up and along the ridge, past the hamlet of Ryecroft to Upper Penn. The present route of the A449/Penn Road evolved only in the modern period, with an 18th-century toll road providing a more convenient thoroughfare and bypassing Upper Penn village.

At the 1831 census Penn had a population of 863.

A guidebook of 1851 says:

Penn is a large parish, comprising 3890 acres, and the two townships and villages of Upper and Lower Penn, the former of which has 716 and the latter 226 inhabitants. The Duke of Sutherland is lord of the manor, and owner of a large portion of the soil. The rest belongs to the following resident freeholders, JW Sparrow, Esq, of Penn Hall; the Rev William Dalton, of Lloyd House; Robert Thacker, Esq, of Muchall Hall; Sidney Cartwright, Esq, of the Leasowes, and a few smaller owners.

A large part of Penn has been absorbed progressively into Wolverhampton, which became a County Borough in 1930 and a Metropolitan borough in 1974, thus detaching much of Penn from the administrative county of Staffordshire. This gradual expansion of the boundaries of Wolverhampton was accompanied by a rapid development of suburban housing, particularly from the Edwardian period, with many residents depending on the Sunbeam car works for employment. Despite the depression of the 1930s, a further surge in housebuilding occurred, with much post-war infill. As a result, the area to the north and west of St. Bartholomew's church is almost entirely occupied by Wolverhampton's suburban housing.

== Ecclesiastical divisions ==
Nowadays, the Parish of Penn contains part of suburban Wolverhampton and part of rural South Staffordshire, where the village of Lower Penn is situated about one mile (1.6 km) to the west, within South Staffordshire and containing the parish's other church, St Anne's. However a large part of Penn in suburban Wolverhampton now falls within other parishes, in particular the Parish of Penn Fields, served by the churches of St Philip, St Joseph and St Aidan.

== Penn ward within Wolverhampton ==
Penn (population 12,392) is a formal ward of Wolverhampton, West Midlands. Penn ward borders the wards of Merry Hill, Graiseley and Blakenhall as well as South Staffordshire. It forms part of the Wolverhampton West constituency.

There are three focal points where shops and other facilities are located, all situated on the A449 Penn Road, which runs south-west from Wolverhampton City Centre: Upper Penn (which is closest to Wolverhampton and contains a hospital), Penn itself, and Springhill (which is adjacent to the city's boundary with Staffordshire).

Penn is a generally advantaged area with many upmarket houses that are mostly situated in the south of the area on land bordering the extensive South Staffordshire countryside.

There are four primary schools within Penn: Springdale, St Bartholomew's C of E, Warstones and Woodfield, all of which include nursery schools. There is also a community special school called Penn Hall School in Vicarage Road. There are no secondary schools in the ward, although a secondary school existed in Manor Road (Penn Secondary Modern School) which was later used by Colton Hills Secondary School for the first two years of senior school prior to expansion of the main Colton Hills site. Shortly after closure, the school buildings were demolished to make way for the present Penn Manor Medical Centre with housing built on the remaining site.

Penn Library is situated in Upper Penn. Planned for closure under council cutbacks, it was ultimately retained. In addition to St. Bartholomew's Church (Anglican), there is St Michael's Roman Catholic Church, Penn United Reformed Church and Springdale Methodist Church. A further smaller Anglican church is St. Aidan's, located in Mount Road. A church in Wynchcombe Avenue was demolished and replaced by housing in the 1980s.

There are currently five public houses in Penn, these are The Mount Tavern, The Roebuck, Rose & Crown and The Holly Bush on Penn Road while the Barley Mow is in Pennwood Lane next to Penn Golf Course (technically in South Staffordshire). The Stag's Head in Sedgley Road has been closed for several years and recently was the subject of a planning application for conversion to a six bedroom house. As of April 2022, this is awaiting a council decision. Still standing but no longer a pub is the former Fox & Goose next to Tesco Express. This was converted to a restaurant several years ago but is currently closed.

== Penn Common ==
Penn Common is a substantial area of countryside which juts into the urban area between Penn, Wolverhampton and Sedgley (part of Dudley). An important amenity for local people, it is occupied by a golf course and farmland. It is overlooked from the east by St Bartholomew's church, descends to a hamlet centred on the old Lloyd's brewery, and rises again to the village of Gospel End. Most of its area falls within South Staffordshire.

== Transport ==
Most of Penn is served by National Express West Midlands 16 (Wolverhampton - Wombourne - Stourbridge) and Diamond Bus 64 (Wolverhampton - Penn, Wakeley Hill). Additional late evening and Sunday journeys are provided by service 16A (Wolverhampton - Wombourne). Warstones Road is served by the 4 (which starts from Pendeford) and operates via the City Centre, Bradmore and Merridale.

Service 16 is based on a former Midland Red bus route. Local service 2 connects the Warstones housing estate with the City Centre and Bushbury. The wide junctions at Mount Road and Springhill Lane date back to trolleybus services, these being the turning points for the service. Older residents still refer to the area located at the Springhill Lane shops as "the terminus".

Penn Common was served by a regular bus service from Wolverhampton to Sedgley which started as a Midland Red service whose main custom was Baggeridge Colliery (closed 1968). For several years after closure additional short workings to Gospel End continued. In 1986, the 564 service was split with West Midlands Travel retaining the route along Mount Road and the Penn Common section being operated under Staffordshire County Council tender by Midland Red West until 1992. The tender was subsequently operated by a number of operators including Stevensons and Arriva Midlands. Over time the number of journeys across Penn Common dwindled until the service was withdrawn in 2017. In August 2020, the Green Bus ran a commercial shopping service (582) to Kidderminster but this attracted little custom.
