= Merridale =

Area of Wolverhampton, West Midlands, England

Coordinates: 52.58420°N 2.15640°W

- Location within the West Midlands
- Population: 3,044 (2001 Census – Merridale / Chapel Ash)
- Metropolitan borough: Wolverhampton
- Metropolitan county: West Midlands
- Region: West Midlands
- Country: England
- Sovereign state: United Kingdom
- Post town: Wolverhampton
- Postcode district: WV
- Dialling code: 01902
- Police: West Midlands
- Fire: West Midlands
- Ambulance: West Midlands
- UK Parliament: Wolverhampton West

Merridale is an area of Wolverhampton, West Midlands, England. It is situated to the south-west of the city centre, on the border of the city council's Graiseley and Park wards.

== Origins and history ==
The place name, Merridale, can be traced back to its earliest known medieval form, 'Muriden' – likely from Old English 'myrge' (meaning sweet, pleasant, agreeable) 'denu' (valley).

Parts of the former Merridale Farm (recently restored and converted into apartments) are the oldest buildings in Wolverhampton apart from the Church and Saxon Pillar. Merridale Court, a 156-home council estate of low rise flats, was opened there in 1955.

Within the area are a number of locally listed buildings – including a coach house dating from the 1850s, built in the Tudor Revival style. This property, along with the nearby former Eye Infirmary, is part of The Oaks (Merridale Road) Conservation Area.

Bantock Park and House are within the area, the house is believed to date from the 1730s, and was originally a farm called New Merridale Farm, then named Merridale House.

The Wolverhampton Grammar School is in the area.

== Today ==
Merridale has changed little since the 1950s when Merridale Court was constructed. Apartments / flats were built circa 2000s near the junction of Merridale Road and Merridale Lane. There are also some private houses (completed 2017) next to merridale court on an old MEB site.

== Public houses ==
There are several pubs in the area. 'The Royal Oak' is on Compton Road and nearby on the corner of Merridale Road and Merridale Gardens is 'The Chindit' – both traditional pubs specialising in ales and lagers. Until the late 2000s, The Quarterhouse pub stood on Compton Road – this has now been demolished. It has been replaced by a vets practice and Sainsbury's Local.
