= Blakenhall =

Suburb of Wolverhampton, England

Coordinates: 52.5730°N 2.127°W

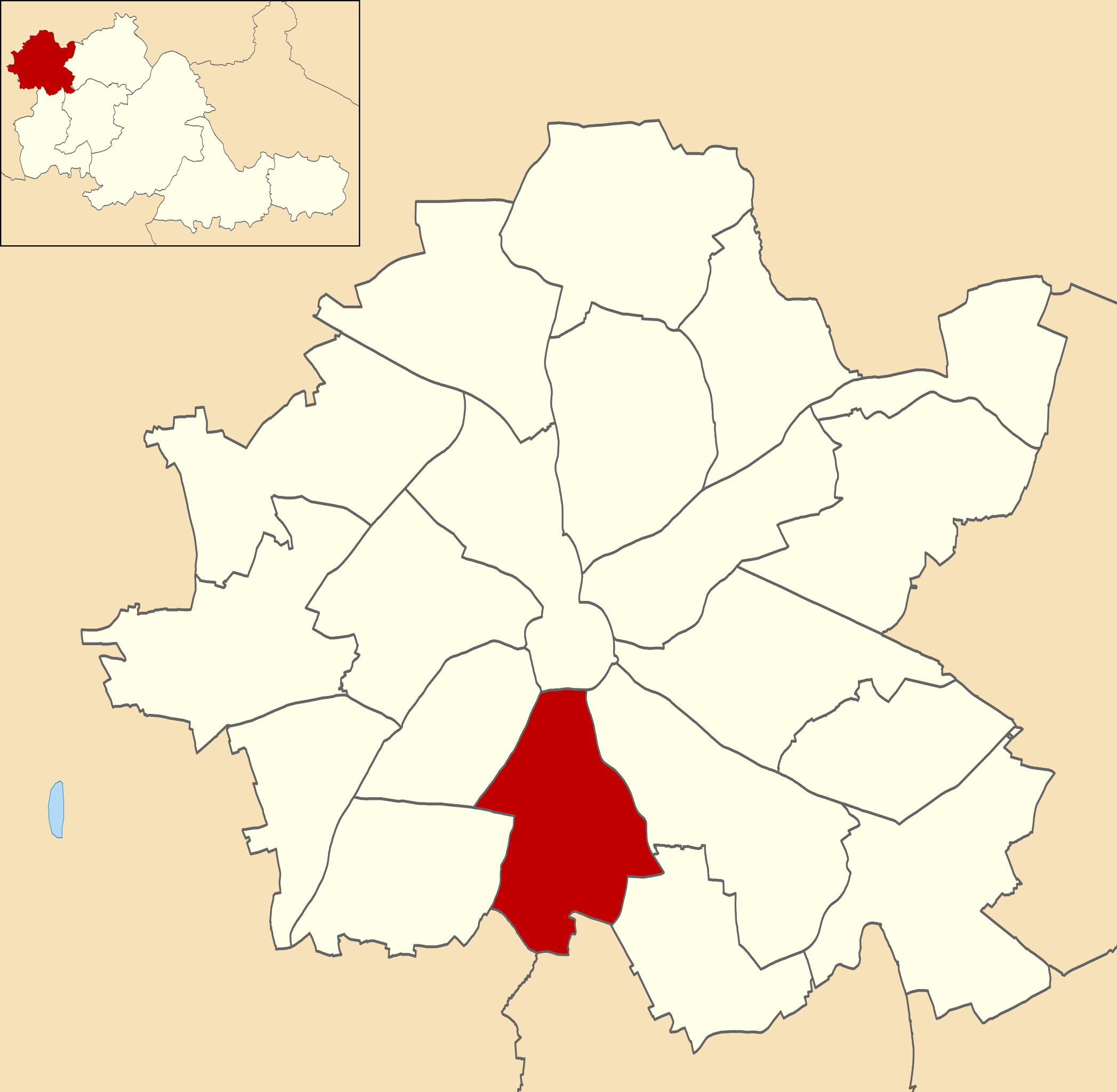

- Location within the West Midlands
- Population: 12,600 (2021)
- OS grid reference: SO910966
- Metropolitan borough: Wolverhampton
- Metropolitan county: West Midlands
- Region: West Midlands
- Country: England
- Sovereign state: United Kingdom
- Post town: Wolverhampton
- Postcode district: WV2
- Dialling code: 01902
- Police: West Midlands
- Fire: West Midlands
- Ambulance: West Midlands
- UK Parliament: Wolverhampton West

Blakenhall is a suburb and ward of Wolverhampton, England. The population of the ward, including Goldthorn Park, was around 12,600 at the 2021 census.

== Toponymy and history ==
Blakenhall's name, according to toponymists, comes from the Old English "blæc" (meaning "black") and "halh" (meaning "nook" or "corner"). It was developed during the late 19th century just south of the town centre with hundreds of terraced houses, some with shop fronts, being built on the Dudley Road (A459) towards Sedgley. Many were also built down the side streets. Wanderers Avenue, the original home of Wolverhampton Wanderers FC, can be found in Blakenhall. The team regularly played on the adjacent Phoenix Park until 1889. Names of the players can be found on the front of the terraced houses along the street.

Wolverhampton's first council houses were built in Blakenhall in 1902, though it would be nearly 20 years before mass council house building took place anywhere else in the area. By the 1980s, these properties were outdated and were finally demolished in the spring of 1988. Vehicle maker AJS moved to a new factory built around Graiseley House in 1914. It closed upon their insolvency in 1931 and the site, now occupied by a supermarket (Tesco since July 2021, previously Waitrose and Safeway), is marked by a sculpture called The Lone Rider, designed by Steve Field.

In 1919, when work began on Wolverhampton's first major council housing development to rehouse families from town centre slums, a site around Green Lane (later renamed Birmingham Road and Thompson Avenue) and Parkfield Road was included in this development. In 1960, 1st Blakenhall Scout Group was formed. The group now meets at St. Johns Methodist Church and is open to boys and girls aged 6–14. The next major development in Blakenhall took place in the 1960s when six tower blocks were constructed. One of the two taller tower blocks, Cobden House, was demolished by a controlled explosion in August 2002. The four smaller tower blocks (Neale House, Villiers House, Cross House, and Ranelagh House) were cleared with mechanical demolitions in 2007. The final taller tower block, Phoenix Rise (previously known as Franchise House), was demolished in 2011.

== Demographics ==
Faith in Blakenhall (2021)
1. Sikhism (40.7%)
2. Christianity (24.3%)
3. No religion (12.2%)
4. Hinduism (10.4%)
5. Islam (4.30%)
6. Buddhism (0.40%)
7. Other Religions (3.30%)
8. Religion not Stated (4.40%)

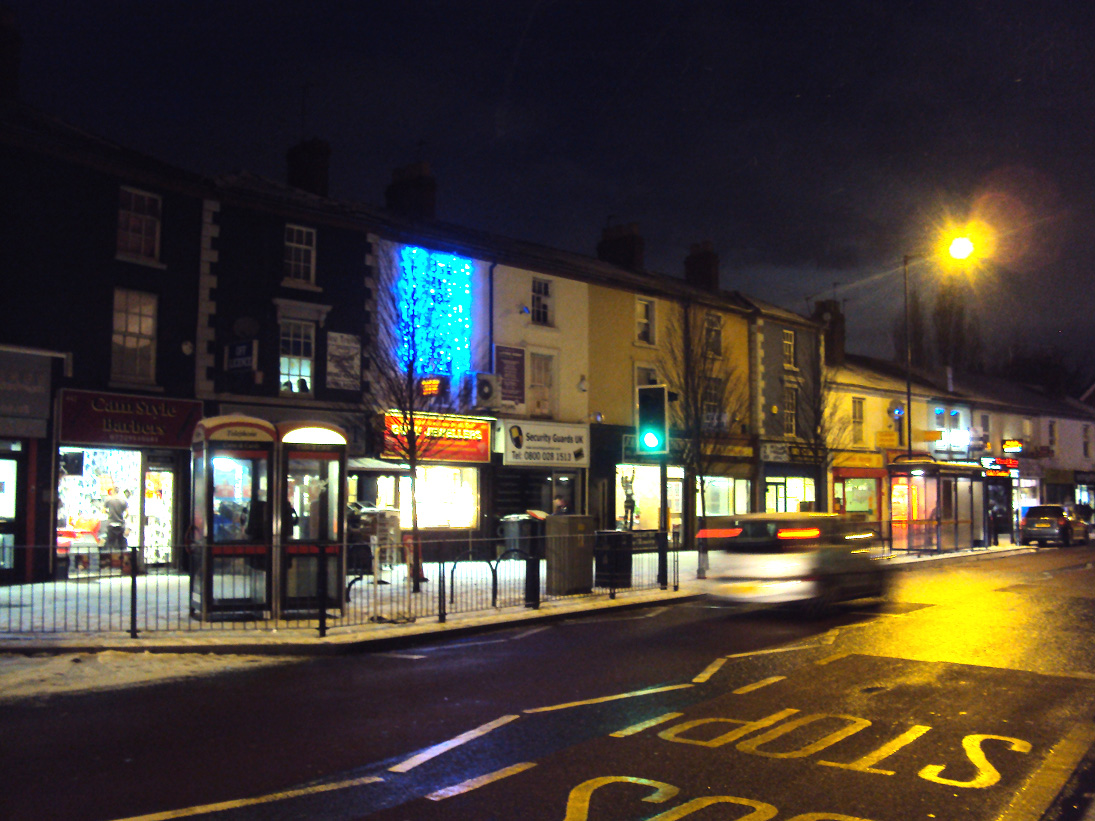
Terraced shops on Dudley Road, Blakenhall

The Blakenhall ward serves Wolverhampton City Council and forms part of the Wolverhampton West constituency. The ward also covers the suburb of Goldthorn Park, immediately to the south, and part of Graiseley. It borders Graiseley, Penn, St Peter's, Ettingshall, and Spring Vale wards, as well as (briefly) South Staffordshire and the Metropolitan Borough of Dudley.

Blakenhall's residents are predominantly descendants of Indians who settled in the area following World War II, with 45.6% of the population claiming Indian ethnicity. The local Gurdwara occupies the site of a former Corona drinks factory, and has at times laid claim to be the largest Gurdwara in Europe. Blakenhall's religious makeup as of the 2021 census was 40.7% Sikh, 24.3% Christian, 16.6% non-religious, 10.4% Hindu, 4.3% Muslim, 3.3% other, and 0.4% Buddhist.

Blakenhall is one of the most deprived districts of Wolverhampton, although it has improved slightly since the 1990s due to its designation as an ABC Regeneration Area. A similar initiative covers the neighbouring All Saints district. Colton Hills Community School and senior part of The Royal School, Wolverhampton are situated in Blakenhall ward. The junior side of The Royal School, Wolverhampton is in Graiseley ward. South Wolverhampton and Bilston Academy was also located in the area in the former Parkfield High School but the academy relocated all facilities to Bilston in 2012.

It was incorrectly reported in 2013 that one of Blakenhall's oldest and most notable buildings, the 1861 St Luke's Church, was to close due to mounting repair bills and structural problems with the tower and spire. The building, which is grade II listed, finally closed as a church in 2017 and became an antiques centre. The congregation now meets in St. Luke's School a short distance away.

The new Blakenhall Community and Healthy Living Centre, operated by Wolverhampton City Council, opened in 2010.
