= Ashmore Park =

Housing estate in Wednesfield, England

Coordinates: 52.60°N 02.06°W

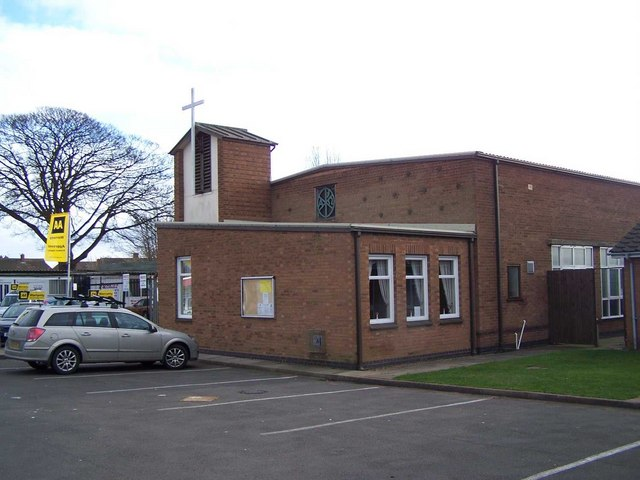
- St. Alban's Church, Ashmore Park

- Location within the West Midlands
- Population: 6,734
- OS grid reference: SJ9601
- Metropolitan borough: Wolverhampton
- Metropolitan county: West Midlands
- Region: West Midlands
- Country: England
- Sovereign state: United Kingdom
- Post town: Wolverhampton
- Postcode district: WV11 2
- Dialling code: 01902
- Police: West Midlands
- Fire: West Midlands
- Ambulance: West Midlands

Ashmore Park is a large housing estate in Wednesfield, England. It has been part of the city of Wolverhampton, West Midlands since 1966, when the majority of Wednesfield was incorporated into Wolverhampton. It forms part of the Wednesfield North ward of the City of Wolverhampton council. The estate consists predominantly of council-built houses, flats and bungalows from the 1950s.

== History ==
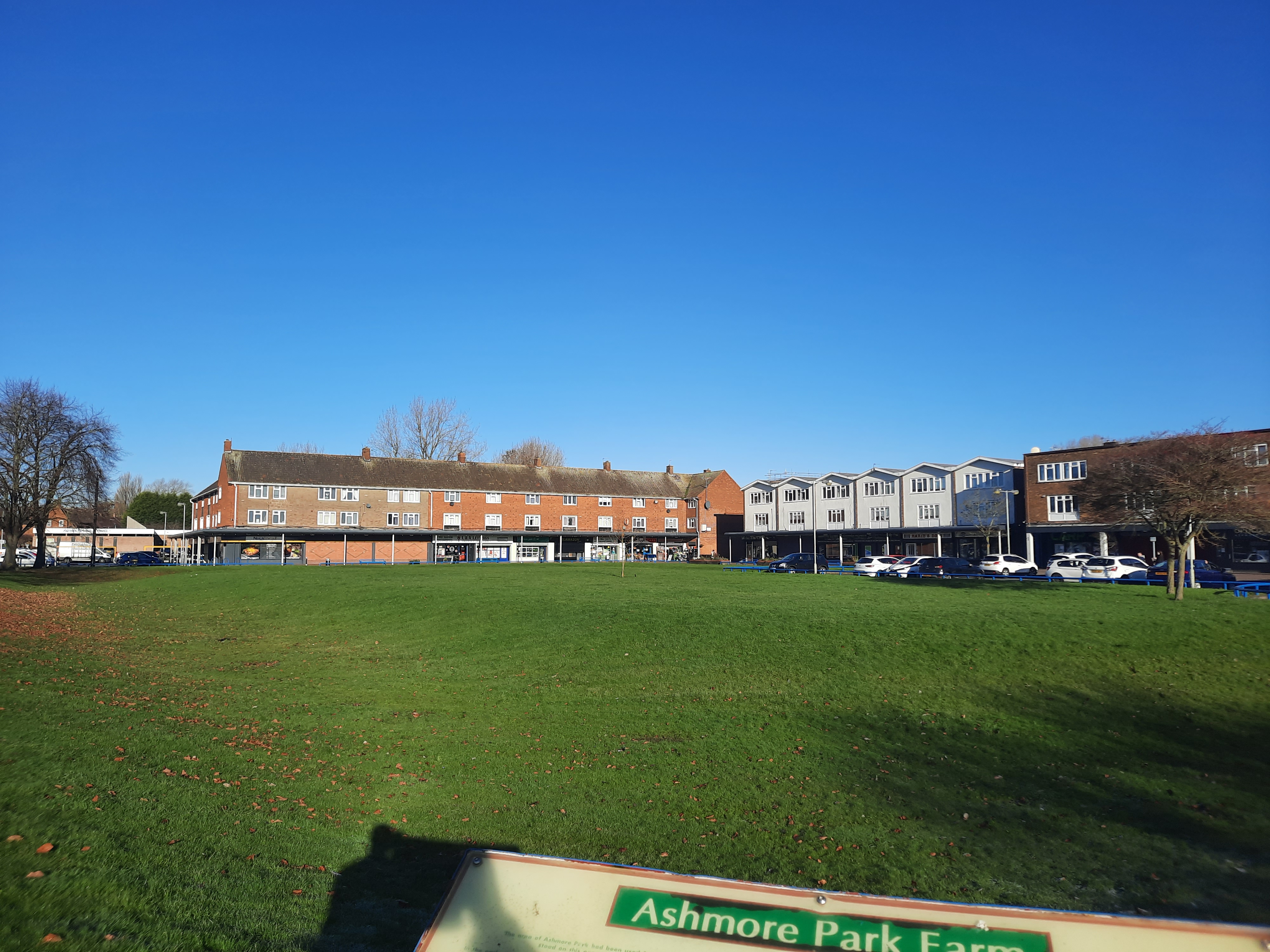
The 14th century Ashmore Park Moat in 2023

Ashmore Park was initially one of the wooded estates Lady Wulfruna transferred to St. Peter's Fold to allow the park to generate income and food. A moat-surrounded farmhouse was built here sometime during the mid-14th century. Three-quarters of the moat still exists today in the "bottom shops" precinct.

A plaque placed by Wolverhampton Civic Society and Ashmore Park Community Association on The Hub Community Centre states Ashmore Park Colliery operated from 1875 to 1948 and employed a total of over 230 people below and above ground. Ordnance Survey mapping shows the colliery linked by a mineral tramway to a basin on the Wyrley and Essington Canal. The land was owned by the Duke of Cleveland. A reminder of the area's mining history arose in 2019 when melting snow revealed a shaft near a children's playground. The Coal Authority carried out work to seal the shaft and compact the filling material.

1,500 homes were initially planned for Ashmore Park by Wednesfield Urban District Council in 1954 as part of Staffordshire County Council's overspill housing scheme for Wolverhampton. The first house was opened on 16 June 1955 by the Chairman of Staffordshire County Council, Alderman A G B Owen, and it was reported that 6,500 people would be housed in 1,750 homes. A shopping precinct and dwellings were opened by Cannock constituency MP Jennie Lee in September 1958.

The Dean of Wolverhampton probably used the homestead in his role as Dean (landlord) of Ashmore Park. The original farmhouse was removed when a new one was built in the early 19th century. In 1957 authorities demolished that farmhouse and built a library near its site.

== Demographics ==
According to the 2001 United Kingdom census, Ashmore Park had a total population of 6,734. Of these, 27.6% of its residents were between the ages of 25 and 44 years old, while 24.3% reported being between the ages of 60 and 74. The neighbourhood is not ethnically diverse, with 97.4% of its residents classified as Caucasian; the largest ethnic minority group is Black Caribbean, representing just 0.9% of the population.

54.5% of the 2,968 households in the neighbourhood were owner-occupied, while 39.4% of homes were council houses. Ashmore Park had an unemployment rate of 7.1%, ranking above the Wolverhampton average of 5.3%. Of those identified as economically inactive, 24.4% were retired. And of all households in the neighbourhood, only 11.1% were not considered deprived at all, while 7.2% were overcrowded.

Christianity is the area's predominant religion, with 81.6% of the population identifying as Christian. 9.4% of residents reported that they did not have a religious affinity.

== Education ==
The estate was served by Ashmore Park County Primary School and Danesfield Primary School. The two merged in 1983 to form Danesmore Primary, but this closed in February 1993. Both schools have since been demolished.

Today a secondary school, Coppice Performing Arts School, serves the estate, with three primary schools: Oak Meadow Primary School, Corpus Christi Catholic School, and St. Alban's Primary School.

== Places of interest ==
At the heart of the estate is a large green park consisting of a children's play area and several sports facilities, including a skate park, multi-sports pitch, BMX track, and bowling green. The park is on the site of Ashmore Colliery and the play area had to be made safe in 2019 after a mine shaft was discovered. The park is also home to the Wednesfield Aces and Wednesfield Dragons cycle speedway teams.

There are two main shopping areas, known locally as the "top" and "bottom" shops due to their geographic location. The "bottom shop" precinct houses a mix of local and independent businesses and underwent an extensive facelift during the early 2000s that included work to preserve the historic moat site.

In 2014 a revamped community centre opened called The Hub at Ashmore Park with many facilities for the local community to use. The library which was located next to the "bottom shops" shopping precinct was closed and merged into the hub, whilst many other libraries were closed or had reduced opening hours in Wolverhampton.

There are two public houses and a social club on the estate: The True Briton, The Ashmore Inn and Corpus Christi Social Club.

In 2014 more than 350 members of the local community signed a petition to save The Ashmore Inn public house from being closed and turned into a retail store. The petition succeeded in having The Ashmore Inn listed as an Asset of Community Value. In 2016 a Coop Food convenience store and Tanning Salon were opened on adjacent land sharing the car park with the public house, whilst the bookmakers previously there moved to the "bottom shops" shopping precinct.

== Transport ==
=== Trains ===
The nearest train stations to Ashmore Park are Bloxwich North, Bloxwich and Wolverhampton.

=== Buses ===
Bus routes serving Ashmore Park include the 9, 57, 59 and 69 lines.

The 59 route, operated by National Express West Midlands and Let'sGo, provides the most frequent service to the estate from Wolverhampton via Heath Town, New Cross Hospital and Wednesfield roughly every six minutes during the day (Monday-Saturday) and every 12 minutes in the evenings, on Sundays, and bank holidays.

The 69 route, also operated by National Express West Midlands, services the lower part of the estate between Wolverhampton and Walsall via Heath Town, New Cross Hospital, Wood End, Coppice Farm, New Invention, Beechdale, and Reedswood Retail Park. This service operates every 30 minutes during the day (Monday-Saturday) and hourly during the day on Sunday.

The 57 route, operated by Chaserider, also serves the lower zone of the estate. It runs from Wolverhampton to Willenhall via Heath Town, Park Village, Wednesfield, Wood End and Lyndale Park. An hourly service operates during the daytime, Mon-Sat. The service previously continued to Bilston.

The 9 route, operated by National Express West Midlands, runs between Walsall and Wolverhampton via Rushall, Pelsall, Bloxwich, New Invention, Wednesfield and Bentley Bridge retail park. This does not enter the estate, rather running along Lichfield Road with stops near Peacock Avenue.
