= Bantock House Museum and Park =

Museum and surrounding parkland in Wolverhampton, England

Coordinates: 52.579988°N 2.154066°W

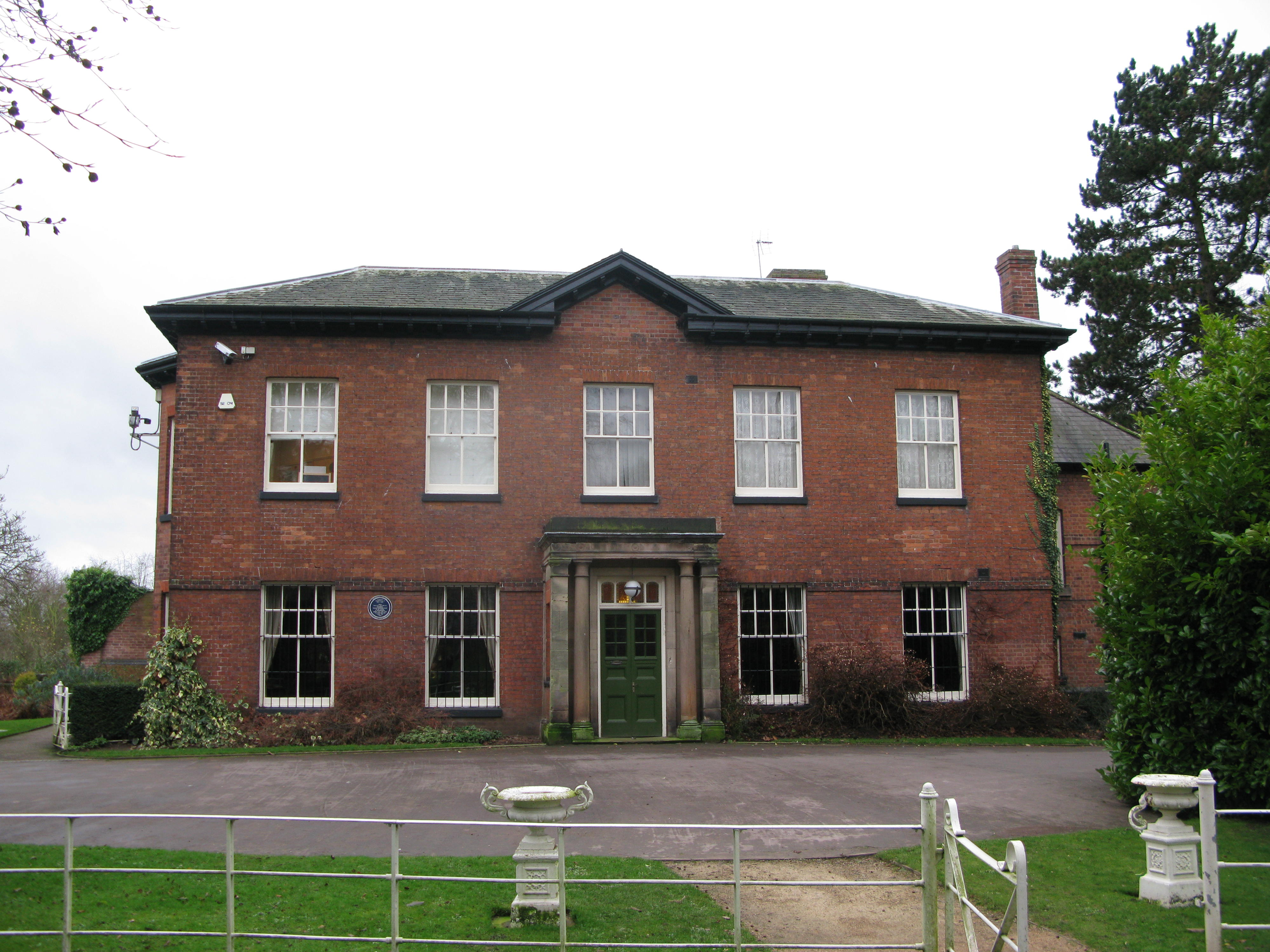
- Established: 1938
- Location: Finchfield, Wolverhampton
- Type: Local history
- Website: wolverhamptonart.org.uk/bantock
- Area: 48 acres (194,249 m^{2})

Bantock House Museum and Park is a museum of Edwardian life and local history, with 48 acres (190,000 m^{2}) of surrounding parkland in Wolverhampton, England. It is named after Alderman Baldwin and Kitty Bantock, who once lived there. Wolverhampton City Council's Arts and Museums service runs it.

== History ==
The house was built in the 1730s as New Merridale Farm. It was extended and improved during Thomas Herrick's occupancy at the beginning of the 19th century and renamed Merridale House. The house had several tenants but in about 1864 was bought by Thomas Bantock, a canal and railway agent. His son Albert Baldwin Bantock, who was twice Mayor of Wolverhampton and also High Sheriff of Staffordshire in 1920, further improved the property following his father's death in 1896. On his death in 1938, without children, he bequeathed the house and park to Wolverhampton Corporation. The house was renamed in his honour in 1940. It is a Grade II listed building.

== Bantock House ==
Bantock House contains displays exploring the lives of the Bantock family and other locally important people. On the ground floor, there are displays about the Bantock family and the way they lived. Upstairs, the focus shifts to the men and women who shaped Wolverhampton and the industries they created, with displays featuring locally made enamels, steel jewellery and japanned ware. The museum is unusual in that it largely avoids traditional "glass case" displays, instead presenting a "more informal and imaginative setting"; visitors are, for example, encouraged to sit on any furniture they can find.

== Bantock House Gardens ==
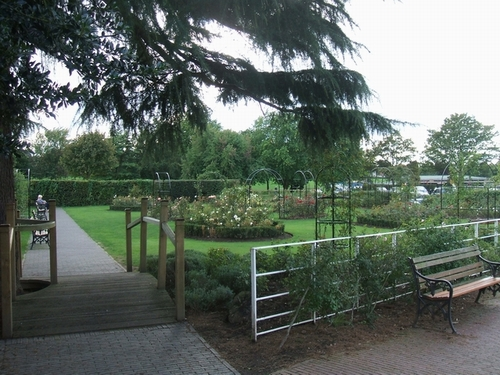
The rose garden

Albert Baldwin Bantock designed the gardens surrounding the house, and in 1998 Wolverhampton City Council restored them to his original designs, allowing visitors today to see the different spaces Baldwin created. At the back of the house there is a sunken garden called the Dutch Garden. There is also a rose garden, with an array of roses named Blythe Spirit, Chapeau de Napoleon, and Glamis Castle; colourful flower borders in the house garden; and a woodland garden that now forms part of a nature trail around the park.

== Bantock Park ==
Bantock Park has 48 acres (190,000 m^{2}) of land and includes a play area for children, a small 18-hole golf course, a putting green, and football fields.

Highland cattle were bred by the Bantock family and are believed to have roamed the park grounds until around the 1930s. To recreate the cows' presence, local craftsman Neil Watt was commissioned to create a cow sculpture, which can now be seen at the front of the house.
