= Dunstall Hill =

Coordinates: 52.597°N 2.129°W

Dunstall
- Location within the West Midlands
- Population: 3,193 (2001 Census)
- Metropolitan borough: Wolverhampton
- Metropolitan county: West Midlands
- Region: West Midlands
- Country: England
- Sovereign state: United Kingdom
- Post town: Wolverhampton
- Postcode district: WV
- Dialling code: 01902
- Police: West Midlands
- Fire: West Midlands
- Ambulance: West Midlands
- UK Parliament: Wolverhampton West

Dunstall Hill is an inner-city area of Wolverhampton, West Midlands, England. It is located on the north of the city centre within the St Peter's ward.

== Dunstall Park ==
Wolverhampton Racecourse, called Dunstall Park has been based at Dunstall since 1888. It moved from its previous location at Broad Meadows, the site of the current West Park after Sir Alexander Staveley Hill sold Dunstall Hall and its estate. The first meeting took place on 13 August that year.

In 2004, an all-weather polytrack surface was laid at the racecourse.

== Dunstall Peace Park ==
All-weather community cricket pitches are available. Dunstall Peace Park hosted Woverhampton's inaugural Eid in the Park festival in 2019 and its second in 2022. From 2023 the event has been held at West Park.

== Railway ==
Dunstall Park railway station opened in 1896, serving trains on the Great Western Railway. It closed in 1968 when services between Wolverhampton and Shrewsbury switched to Wolverhampton High Level station.

== Aviation ==
In June 1910, just four years after the first flight in Europe, Dunstall hosted the first all-British flying meeting at Dunstall Park.
