= Newbridge, Wolverhampton =

Suburb of Wolverhampton, England

Coordinates: 52.5947°N 2.1574°W

Newbridge is a suburb of the city of Wolverhampton, West Midlands in England. It is situated north-west of the city centre, on the A41 Tettenhall Road.

== Name and origins ==
The earliest known mention of the area came in 1286 as Novo Ponte - Latin for New Bridge. The name indicates a yet earlier bridge at this location. The bridge took the London-Holyhead road (the modern-day Meadow View) over the river Smestow and later, the Staffordshire and Worcestershire canal. On Yates's map of 1775, the name can be seen as two words, New Bridge, though the contracted form was in use by 1332 - (atte) newebruge.

== History ==
In the early 19th century the London-Holyhead road was realigned to cross the valley on an embankment over the Staffordshire and Worcestershire canal of 1771 and the river Smestow ran through the suburb in a SW-NE direction. The 19th-century canal bridge had to be replaced by a more modern structure, capable of carrying increased traffic, built by Wolverhampton's County Borough council in the 1930s.

== Today ==
The area is home to Spurgeon's Child Care, Newbridge House care home and was the location of the headquarters of Free Radio Shropshire & Black Country. A shopping parade exists around the north western entrance to Newbridge Crescent, with shops and amenities including branches of Domino's Pizza, Costcutter and was the location of a Co-operative Food, as well as individual stores and eateries such as Newbridge Wines, Chopsticks Cantonese take away, Newbridge Fryer fish and chip shop, Iridium Spa, Ego and Headley hairdressing, and The Newbridge pub and carvery. The Co-op store closed on 10 June 2022 and re-opened as a One Stop. Bernard Savage Bespoke Kitchens, the York Hotel and Mother India restaurant are all positioned slightly further to the south east on the A41 Tettenhall Road.

=== Education ===
The Newbridge Preparatory School is based on Newbridge Crescent.Wolverhampton Girls High School is situated on St Judes Road West. Newbridge Preparatory School has been an Independent Day School in Wolverhampton since 1937 and moved to its present site in Newbridge Crescent in 1949. The school was originally founded by an eminent local surgeon and initially operated as a member of the Parents’ National Education Union.

=== Sport ===
The Wolverhampton Lawn Tennis and Squash Club is based on Newbridge Crescent, as is pedestrian access to the new Wolverhampton Wanderers FC training ground at nearby Compton via Newbridge Avenue.
