= Coppice Performing Arts School =

Coppice School, (formerly Coppice Performing Arts School)

Location
- Ecclestone Road, Wednesfield; Wolverhampton, West Midlands, WV11 2QE; England; 52°36′41″N 2°03′15″W

Information
- Type: Academy
- Motto: Foundations for Excellence
- Local authority: Wolverhampton City Council
- Trust: Central Learning Partnership Trust
- Department for Education URN: 145114 Tables
- Ofsted: Reports
- Head of school: Georgetta Holloway & Joanne Thomas
- Gender: Mixed
- Age range: 11–18
- Enrolment: 998 As of 2023
- Capacity: 1009
- Houses: Wightwick; Chillington; Moseley; Bantock
- Website: www.coppiceschool.net

Coppice Performing Arts School is an 11–18 mixed secondary school and sixth form with academy status in Wednesfield, Wolverhampton, West Midlands, England.

The school has a resource base for students with moderate learning difficulties. It has playing fields, a theatre and dance studio. The school also offers extended school programmes within the local community.

== History ==
Coppice was designated as a Performing Arts school in September 2003. It became an academy in 2018, as part of a multi-academy trust, Central Learning Partnership Trust.

The school has the Artsmark Gold award and Investors in People standard. Coppice is involved in the Sport in the Community programme, with a co-ordinator in school two days a week.

The school's sixth form works with Heath Park School & Moseley Park School, a number of subjects being shared across the three schools.

== Academic performance and inspections ==
In 2014, the school was inspected by Ofsted and judged to Require Improvement. In 2016, it was again judged to Require Improvement. In 2022, it was judged Good.

At GCSE, the school's Progress 8 benchmark in 2023 was average. 5% of children at the school that year were entered for the English Baccalaureate, compared to 26% in state schools in Wolverhampton as a whole and 39% nationally. 39% of children at the school that year achieved grade 5 or higher in English and mathematics GCSEs, the same figure as in Wolverhampton as a whole, and compared to 45% nationally. The school's Attainment 8 score that year was 48, compared to 46 in both Wolverhampton as a whole and nationally.

== Musical theatre ==
Coppice students have performed amateur musical theatre productions at the Grand Theatre, Wolverhampton on several occasions including Les Misérables in 2006, We Will Rock You in 2008, Fame in 2009 and Our House in 2012.
