= Monmore Green =

Area in Wolverhampton, West Midlands, United Kingdom

Coordinates: 52°34′40″N 2°06′10″W

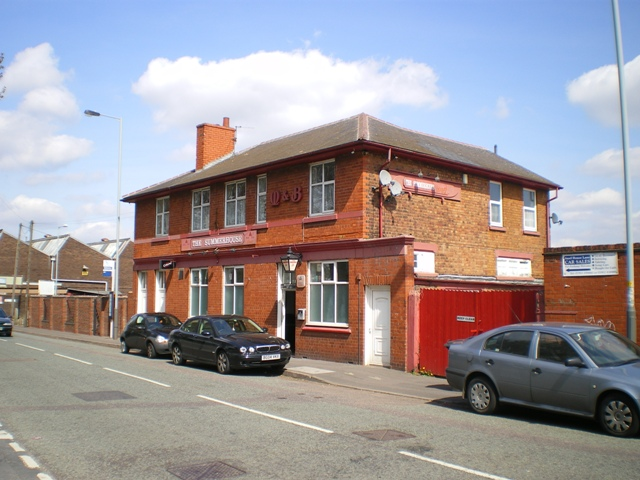
The Summerhouse pub, Monmore Green

Monmore Green is an area of Wolverhampton, West Midlands, England. It is situated about 1 mile (1.6 km) to the south-east of the city centre, in the East Park ward.

It is where Monmore Green Stadium is situated, which is home to the Wolverhampton Wolves speedway team and is also a venue for greyhound racing With Racing Manager Tony Williamson Managing the racing operation.

The powerhouse of the former Wolverhampton Power Station (decommissioned 1976) remains standing in Commercial Road.

The Midland Metro runs through the area along Bilston Road (A41) with stops at The Royal and Priestfield where the tramline drops down to the former GWR railway track. The main bus route is National Express West Midlands service 79 between Wolverhampton and West Bromwich which operates every 10 minutes.
