= Stow Heath =

Area of Wolverhampton, England

Coordinates: 52.5814°N 2.0905°W

- Location within the West Midlands
- Population: 1,381 (Census 2001)
- Metropolitan borough: Wolverhampton
- Metropolitan county: West Midlands
- Region: West Midlands
- Country: England
- Sovereign state: United Kingdom
- Post town: Wolverhampton
- Postcode district: WV
- Dialling code: 01902
- Police: West Midlands
- Fire: West Midlands
- Ambulance: West Midlands
- UK Parliament: Wolverhampton South East

Stow Heath is an area and ancient manor in the city of Wolverhampton, West Midlands, located in the east half of the city.

== Place name and origins ==
The first known recording of the place name Stowheath was in c.1272 as Stowheth, from Old English stow - place of assembly / holy place and hæth - level, open, uncultivated land, so 'the heath of a place called Stow'.

An Earl Kenwulf of Stowheath was said to have fallen at the Battle of Tettenhall (910). Stowheath was one of the two main royal manors in the Wolverhampton area. It included east Wolverhampton, Bilston and part of Willenhall, and was in the direct ownership of the King. The first lord of Stowheath manor was Robert Burnell in the 13th century, Lord Chancellor of England and Bishop of Bath and Wells.

== History ==
It is thought that the original manor house was built in Bilston in 1450, a John De Mollesley being the first incumbent. This building exists to this day, as The Greyhound and Punchbowl Inn pub. A hill or tumulus is said to have existed in Stowheath on the Willenhall road, half a mile south west of Neachells, called Stowman's Hill. Thought at various times to be a boundary marker between Wolverhampton, Willenhall, Bilston and Wednesfield, or a low (burial mound). In Isaac Taylor's map of Wolverhampton (1750), the two manors of Deanery and Stowheath are named. In 1851 the manor was held by the Duke of Sutherland, and TW Gifford, Esq. By the end of the 19th century, almost the whole of Stowheath Manor was held by local family, the Levesons.

In 2023, 19-year-old Shawn Seesahai was stabbed to death in Stow Heath's Stowlawn Playing Fields by two 12-year-old boys, who became the youngest criminal defendants to be convicted of murder in the 21st century.

== Today ==
Most of the area consists of 20th Century housing, including the Stowlawn and East Park estates. Stowlawn Primary School is also in the area, as are the pubs, the 'Happy Wanderer' (Demolished) the 'Cleveland Arms' and 'The Angel Inn'. The Stowheath Lane Kitchens delivered meals service is in Stowheath, next door to the Stowheath Garden Centre.

== Demography ==
Almost a quarter of Stowheath's population (21.2%) are of Indian ethnicity, with the majority of the population (65.3%) classed as White British (English with a possible number of Welsh, Scottish and Northern Irish). 60.2% of residents class their religion as Christian, followed by 13.4% as Hindu. 10.5% of Stowheath's population have no religion.
