= Whitmore Reans =

Coordinates: 52.594°N 2.145°W

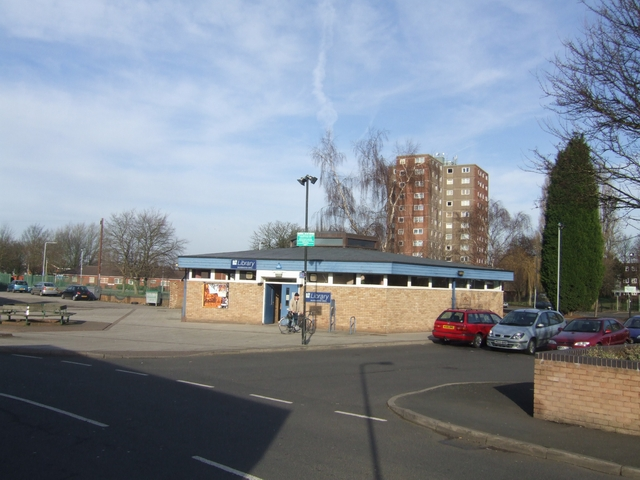
- Whitmore Reans Library

- Location within the West Midlands
- Population: 7,778 (2001 Census)
- Metropolitan borough: Wolverhampton
- Metropolitan county: West Midlands
- Region: West Midlands
- Country: England
- Sovereign state: United Kingdom
- Post town: Wolverhampton
- Postcode district: WV6
- Dialling code: 01902
- Police: West Midlands
- Fire: West Midlands
- Ambulance: West Midlands
- UK Parliament: Wolverhampton West

Whitmore Reans is in Wolverhampton, West Midlands, England. It is situated to the north-west of the city centre, in the city council's Park and St Peter's wards.

== History ==
The name 'Whitmore' is said by toponymists to come from the Old English 'hwit' (white) and 'mor' (moor - which was used to describe a marshy area) - possibly a foggy area of marsh land, and 'Reans' is said to possibly mean a type of furrow created during ploughing, designed to drain the land. Another name used for the nearby area that West Park now stands on was the 'Hungry Leas' - hungry being used to describe land which was little or no use for agriculture.

The 1842 Tithe map shows only Whitmore End House in the area. This was soon to change - Wolverhampton's population was rising rapidly in the mid-1800s - and so a 'new town' would be built to the north west of Wolverhampton. It was originally to be called 'New Hampton', as is known today from the street names Newhampton Roads east and west, but Whitmore Reans was commonly used and stuck.

The terraced housing that makes up the Whitmore Reans residential area was built alongside roads, cartways and tracks that radiated out from the town centre servicing fields that spread out towards Dunstall and Tettenhall. Newhampton Road (known then as Whitmore End Lane), Molineux Alley & what is now Staveley Road / Dunstall Road, as well as Waterloo Road (then called Wellington Road) were the routes through the fields that houses would be built alongside & between.

Focal points in the Whitmore Reans area were Leicester Square, with its shops and circular iron gentleman's urinal, known under various names such as the 'Pepper Pot' and the 'Green Man', and the area of shops on Newhampton Road West, known to locals as 'West Market'.

In 1924, the Courtaulds Company started constructing a factory on the former site of Dunstall Hall. Operating from 1926 onwards, the factory produced rayon yarn. Known to many generations and a visible landmark in Whitmore Reans and beyond for almost fifty years were the Courtaulds chimneys, known as the 'three sisters'. They were demolished in June 1973. The Farndale housing estate now stands on the former Courtaulds grounds.

== Historic public houses ==
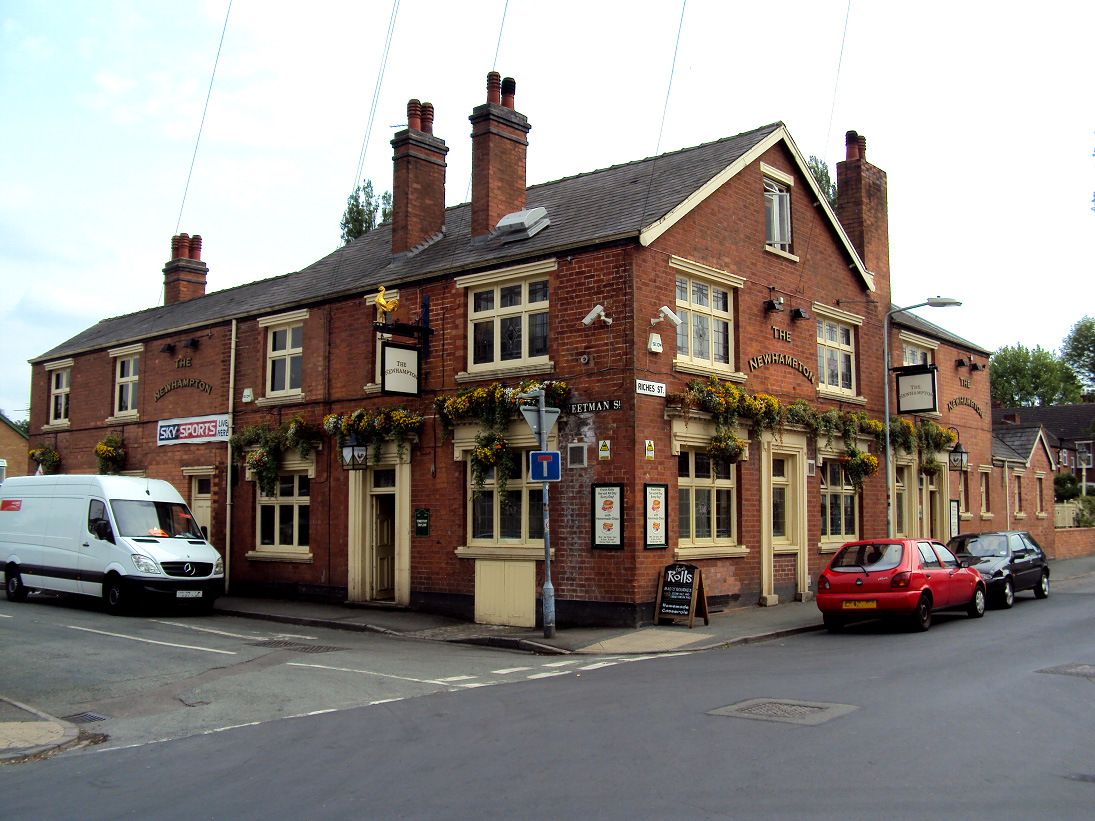
The Newhampton Inn, Whitmore Reans

Whitmore Reans had a good selection of public houses, some tucked away amongst the Victorian terraced streets.The Newhampton - another Victorian corner pub favoured by CAMRA members, with great ale selection and a bowls green (closed permanently early October 2018)

Sadly, from 2000 onwards, there have been a few pub closures. The Tipster (the corner of Dunstall Road & Lowe Street - demolished, replaced with flats), The Victoria (Gatis Street - in a state of ruin & boarded up), The Red Lion (demolished - now new housing on Great Hampton Street) and the pub next door on Great Hampton Street, The Ash Tree, once a favourite with Wolverhampton Wanderers fans, is no longer a pub. The Golden Eagle (corner of Hordern Road & Court Road - closed, illegally operating as a Mosque in 2010).

== Today ==
The area's population displays its recent history of immigration in the diversity of its residents. There are English, Afro-Caribbean, Asian, Polish, Kurdish, African, Irish and many other ethnicities residing in Whitmore Reans. It also has a small number of student residents who reside at the nearby university campus on Waterloo Road, and in private lets dotted throughout the area. Historically, Whitmore Reans is considered to be quite a genteel part of Wolverhampton, being located next to the picturesque West Park.

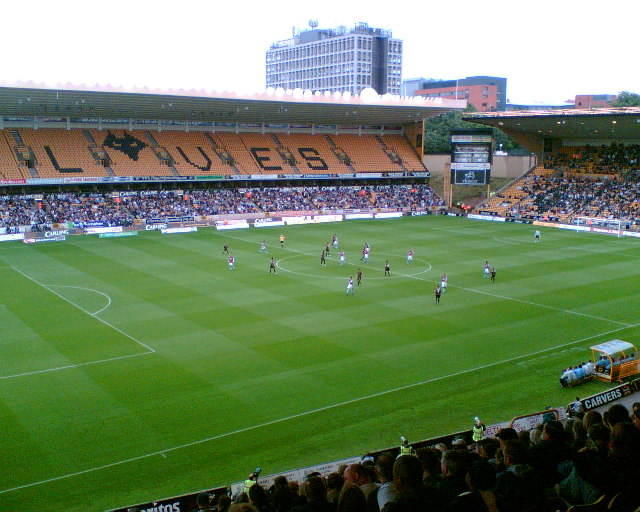
Molineux Stadium, home of Wolverhampton Wanderers

Since 1889, Whitmore Reans has been dominated by the Wolverhampton Wanderers football ground, Molineux Stadium, which stands on the eastern side of Waterloo Road. However, all signs of the original stadium disappeared during the first half of the 20th century and the oldest part of the current stadium was built in 1978.

In 2000, as part of the regeneration, The Newhampton Arts Centre, a community arts centre was developed with lottery funding on the site of the old municipal grammar school and provides a venue for a culturally diverse range of arts activities. Although originally a community project, Newhampton Arts Centre has hosted a variety of events including Wolverhampton's first Strummerjam.

Whitmore Reans has a shopping arcade which replaced some of the terraced housing called 'The Avion Centre', which has several shops. There is also a library, located just outside the Avion Centre.

New Hampton Road East and New Hampton Road West (which form the boundary between the Park and St Peter's wards) are secondary roads, but form the main route through Whitmore Reans. At the junction of the New Hampton Roads with Hunter and Clifford streets are several more shops..

In 2005, Wolverhampton City Council investigated the Farndale estate, built on land formerly occupied by the Courtaulds factory. It was discovered that soil in the gardens of a small number of properties were contaminated with high levels of carbon disulphide, a chemical used in the manufacture of rayon. As a result of the investigation, and work alongside Akzo Nobel (the company who bought out Courtaulds in 1998), four vacant terraced properties in Welbury Gardens were demolished.

== Notable residents ==
- Suzanne Paul, make-up lady
