= Scotlands Estate =

Coordinates: 52.614°N 2.098°W

The Scotlands
- Location within the West Midlands
- Metropolitan borough: Wolverhampton
- Metropolitan county: West Midlands
- Region: West Midlands
- Country: England
- Sovereign state: United Kingdom
- Post town: WOLVERHAMPTON
- Postcode district: WV10
- Dialling code: 01902
- Police: West Midlands
- Fire: West Midlands
- Ambulance: West Midlands
- UK Parliament: Wolverhampton

The Scotlands Estate is a residential area of Wolverhampton, West Midlands, England.

The area was built between 1935 and 1937 as council housing to rehouse families from town centre slums. It formed an effective extension to the nearby Low Hill estate, which was also developed by the local council and was built between 1925 and 1929.

Part of the estate, including all of Barrie Crescent and most of the northern section of Keats Road, was demolished in the mid-1980s following the deterioration of the condition of many houses.

The remaining houses have since been refurbished.

However, the Scotlands is still one of the most deprived parts of Wolverhampton, with high levels of crime, poverty and unemployment.
