= Heath Town =

Area of Wolverhampton, England

Coordinates: 52.591662°N 2.109773°W

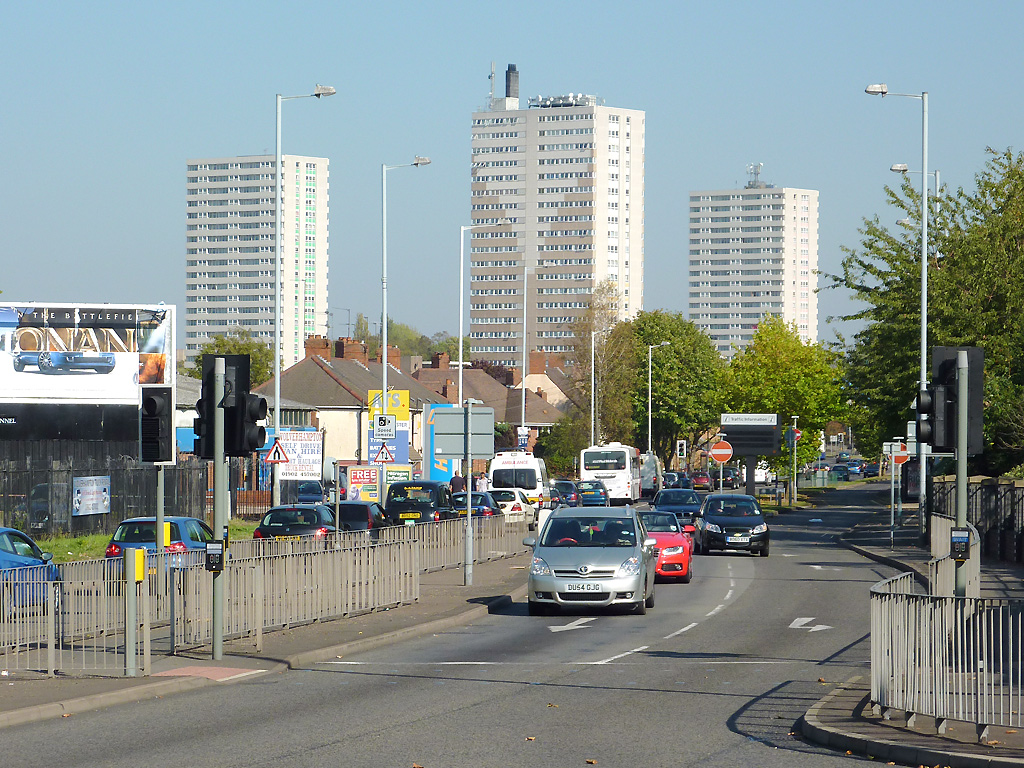
- Wednesfield Road and Heath Town tower blocks

- Location within the West Midlands
- Population: 13,965 (2011 Census.Ward)
- OS grid reference: SO9266199324
- Metropolitan borough: Wolverhampton
- Metropolitan county: West Midlands
- Region: West Midlands
- Country: England
- Sovereign state: United Kingdom
- Post town: Wolverhampton
- Postcode district: WV10
- Dialling code: 01902
- Police: West Midlands
- Fire: West Midlands
- Ambulance: West Midlands
- UK Parliament: Wolverhampton North East

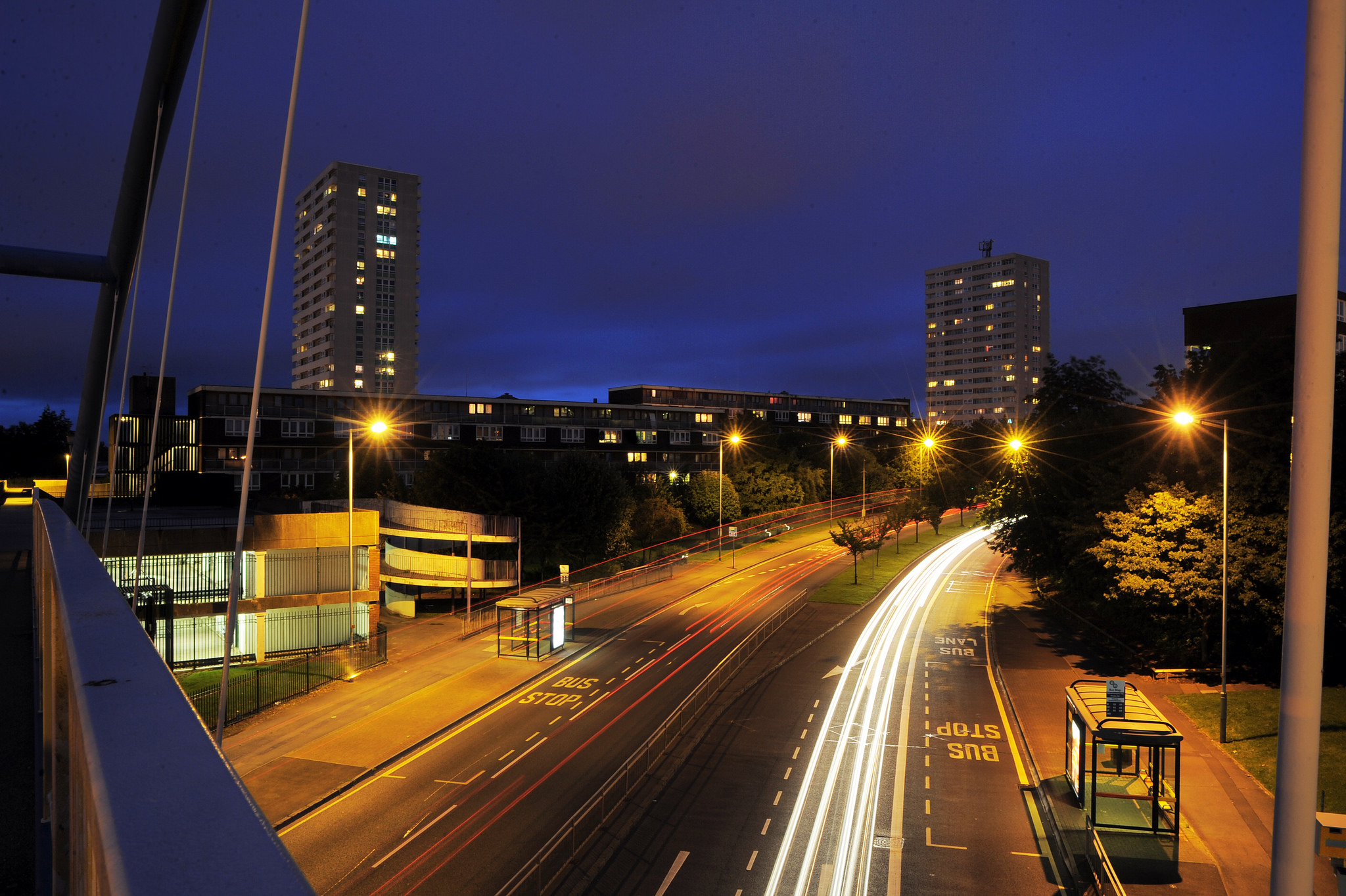
A view of Heath Town at night taken from the pedestrian bridge

Heath Town is a suburban area of Wolverhampton, in the county of the West Midlands, England, to the east of the city centre. It is also a ward of City of Wolverhampton Council. The ward forms part of the Wolverhampton North East parliamentary constituency.

Heath Town ward borders the wards of Bushbury South and Low Hill, Fallings Park, Wednesfield North, Wednesfield South, East Park and St Peter's.

As well as Heath Town, the ward covers parts of Park Village, Springfield, Horseley Fields and Wednesfield. It is home to New Cross Hospital (the city's main Hospital), Wolverhampton Railway station, Heath Park Secondary school and a Royal Mail distribution centre.

== History ==
Wolverhampton was connected to the railways in 1837, with the first station located at Wednesfield Heath, later known as Heath Town, on the Grand Junction Railway. This station was demolished in 1965.

In 1850 the Holy Trinity Church and almshouses were built, as part of the expansion of Heath Town.

On 31 December 1894 Heathtown became a civil parish, being formed from the part of the parish of Wednesfield in Heath Town Urban District. On 1 April 1927 the parish was abolished and merged with Wolverhampton. In 1921 the parish had a population of 13,082. From 1894 to 1927 Heathtown was an urban district.

In the late 19th century, many terraced houses were built next to the factories near the main road to Lichfield. In the 1960s many of these were demolished and replaced with a new estate designed by Wolverhampton Borough architects. The new Heath Town estate was officially opened in April 1969 by Princess Margaret. The former street plan was defined by the line of the Wolverhampton Road and Lincoln, Inkerman and Grove streets have kept their original names.

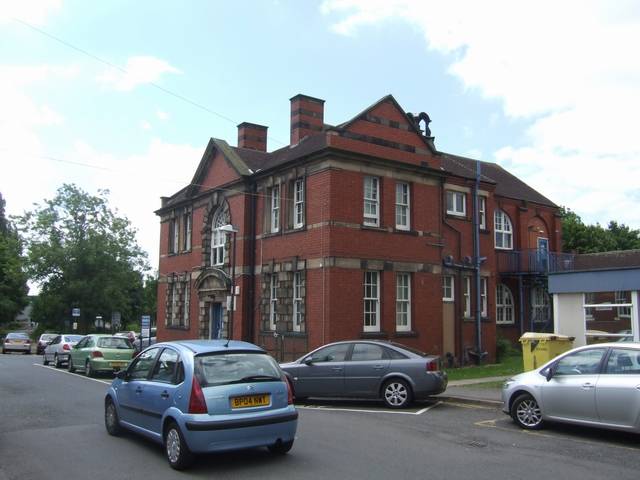
New Cross Hospital - Original Workhouse Board Offices

New Cross Hospital is built on the site of the former New Cross Workhouse. The design of the new buildings came about through a competition and the winning entry was from Arthur Marshall of Nottingham. The foundation stone was laid in September 1900 by Chairman of the Guardians, Mr Price, and the workhouse was formally opened on 24 September 1903. The workhouse could take up to 1,246 inmates, 20 nurses, and 60 other officers. The buildings occupied an area of six acres, and the total cost was £156,879. After 1930, control of the workhouse site passed to the Wolverhampton Public Assistance Committee and it became New Cross Hospital. Many of the old workhouse blocks have now been replaced by modern buildings.

In the 1900s the Chubb Lock and Safe Company was a major employer in Heath Town. In 1908 the Chubb safe works was opened on Wednesfield Road and workers were transferred from the London safe works which had closed. In 1938 Chubb & Son's Lock & Safe Co Ltd premises were expanded and workers were moved from the premises in Railway Street. Chubb remained an important industry in Heath Town until 2000 when it was sold to Assa Abloy, a Swedish lock maker and Gunnebo, another Swedish security company. The Wednesfield Road safe works were closed and much of the site was sold off for housing.

== Demographics ==
White British residents are still the largest ethnic group in Heath Town. However, it has a large percentage of Asian and Afro-Caribbean residents who migrated to England during the 1950s and 1960s and originally settled in the Victorian terraces before relocating to the modern council flats. In more recent years, the area has become a popular destination for Eastern European and African immigrants.

The 2011 census states the population as 13,965 made up of approximately 48% females and 52% males with an average age of 34. 70.0% of people living in Heath Town were born in England. 5.0% India, 3.1% Jamaica, 1.7% Zimbabwe, 1.6% Philippines, 0.9% Somalia, 0.7% Nigeria, 0.6% Ireland, 0.5% China, 0.5% Pakistan.

The 2011 census shows the ethnic mix of Heath Town ward as predominantly white:

- 48.66% white British
- 16.4% black
- 16.1% Asian
- 8% mixed
- 7% white other
- 0.8% Chinese.

80.7% of people living in Heath Town ward speak English. The other top languages spoken are 3.5% Punjabi, 2.1% Polish, 1.9% Kurdish, 1.2% Lithuanian, 1.0% Tagalog/Filipino, 0.7% Persian, 0.7% Somali, 0.7% Arabic, 0.6% Greek.

The rich diversity of culture in the area is celebrated each August with an international fun day event on Heath Town Park.

== Religion ==
The religious make up of Heath Town is 52.9% Christian, 21.2% no religion, 7.4% Muslim, 6.4% Sikh, 2.8% Hindu, 0.5% Buddhist, 0.1% agnostic.

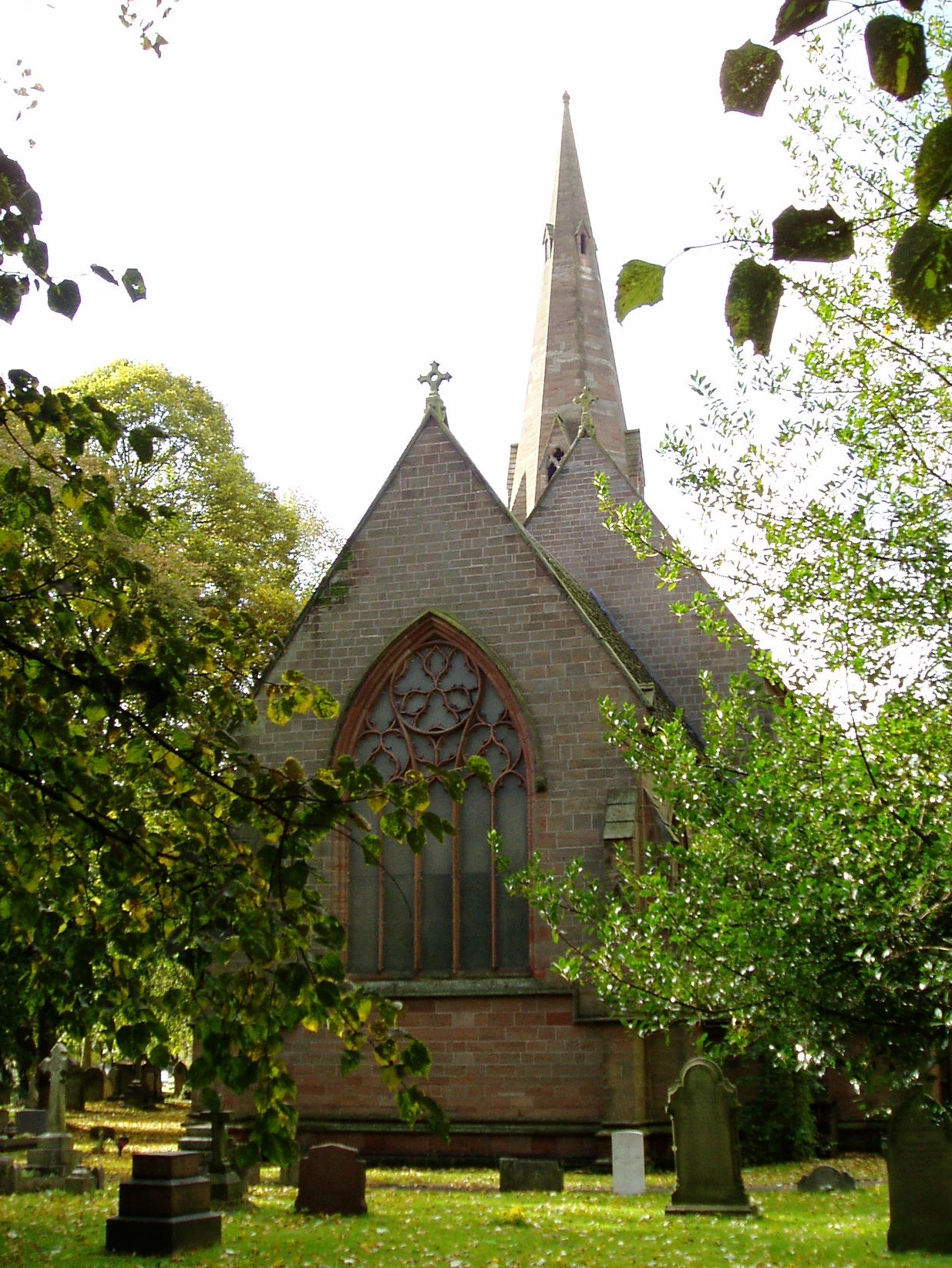
Holy Trinity Church, Heath Town

Churches and temples in the area are:

- Guru Nanak Satasang Sikh Temple, Cannock Road
- Holy Trinity Church, Bushbury Road
- New Testament Church of God, Wednesfield Road
- St Patrick's Catholic Church, Wolverhampton Road
- St Stephen's Church, Hilton Street

== Places of interest ==
=== Heath Town Park ===
Heath Town Park is a neighbourhood park that serves the local community. The site is a public memorial to the men of Heath Town who gave their lives in the First World War. The park is surrounded on three sides by residential properties with a main road running along the fourth. The main entrance to the park is from Church Street which is accessed from the residential area. The park is compact but has many facilities including two football pitches, play area, fitness trail, multi-use games area, wooded area, open space and seating. There is also a World War I War Memorial said to be the oldest in Wolverhampton. The park is well used by the local community and since 2012 has been protected by Fields in Trust as part of the Queen Elizabeth II Fields Challenge. This was a project to safeguard the future of parks and green spaces as public recreation land for future generations to enjoy and provide a permanent legacy of the Diamond Jubilee and the Olympics.

=== Heath Town Baths ===
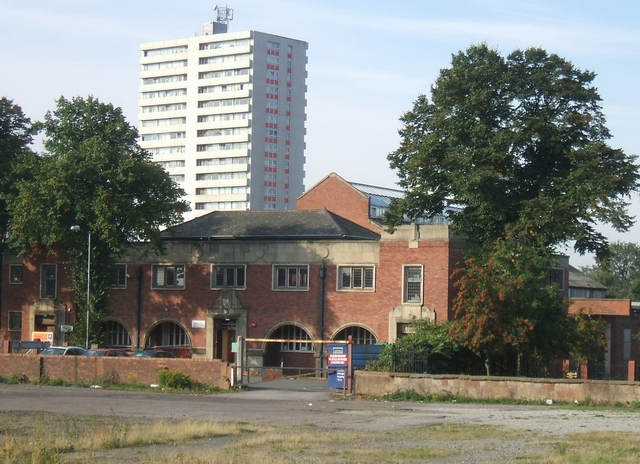
Heath Town Baths

Heath Town public baths were designed by H. B. Robinson, Borough Surveyor and Engineer. They were opened on 16 December 1932, by Alderman F. A. Willcock, chair of Wolverhampton Borough Council's Parks and Baths Committee. The Main Swimming Bath was 75 feet long by 34 feet wide. The Children's Swimming Bath was 40 feet long by 25 feet wide-ranging from a depth from three feet to three feet three inches deep. The building also included Wolverhampton's first large public washhouse which housed four rotary washing machines, twenty one drying horses, three electrically operated hydro-extractors, fifteen washing stalls for hand washing, drying houses and irons. The building also housed Heath Town's public library. The baths eventually closed in 2002, and the library closed on 3 November 2006.

Heath Town Baths is a grade II listed building and has both architectural and social-historical importance locally and architectural significance nationally. Since 2006 it has since fallen into substantial disrepair. The building sits at the heart of Heath Town and its preservation and bringing back into use is stated to be a high priority in the Neighbourhood Plan. The Tessa Sanderson Foundation and Academy supports the campaign to bring the baths back into use. Heath Town Swimming Club which won several international competitions in the 1940s–1950s was based at the baths.

=== Grand Station / Wolverhampton Low Level Railway Station ===
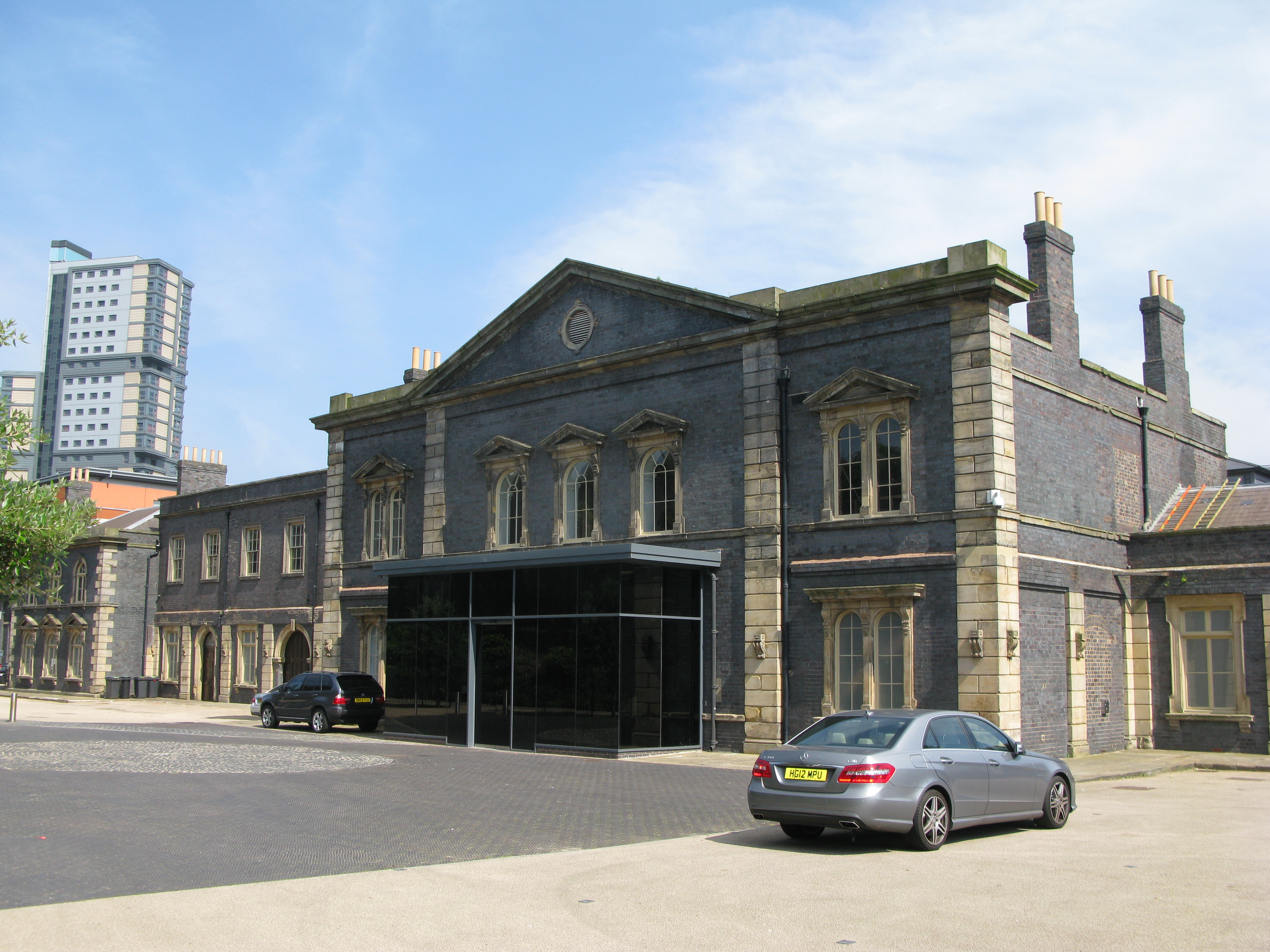
Wolverhampton Low Level Station - now Grand Station wedding and conference venue

Grand Station is a Grade II listed building used as a venue for Weddings, Banquets & Conferences. but was originally the Wolverhampton Low Level Station. The station opened 1854 and closed in 1981 but the buildings were listed in 1986.

=== Almshouses ===
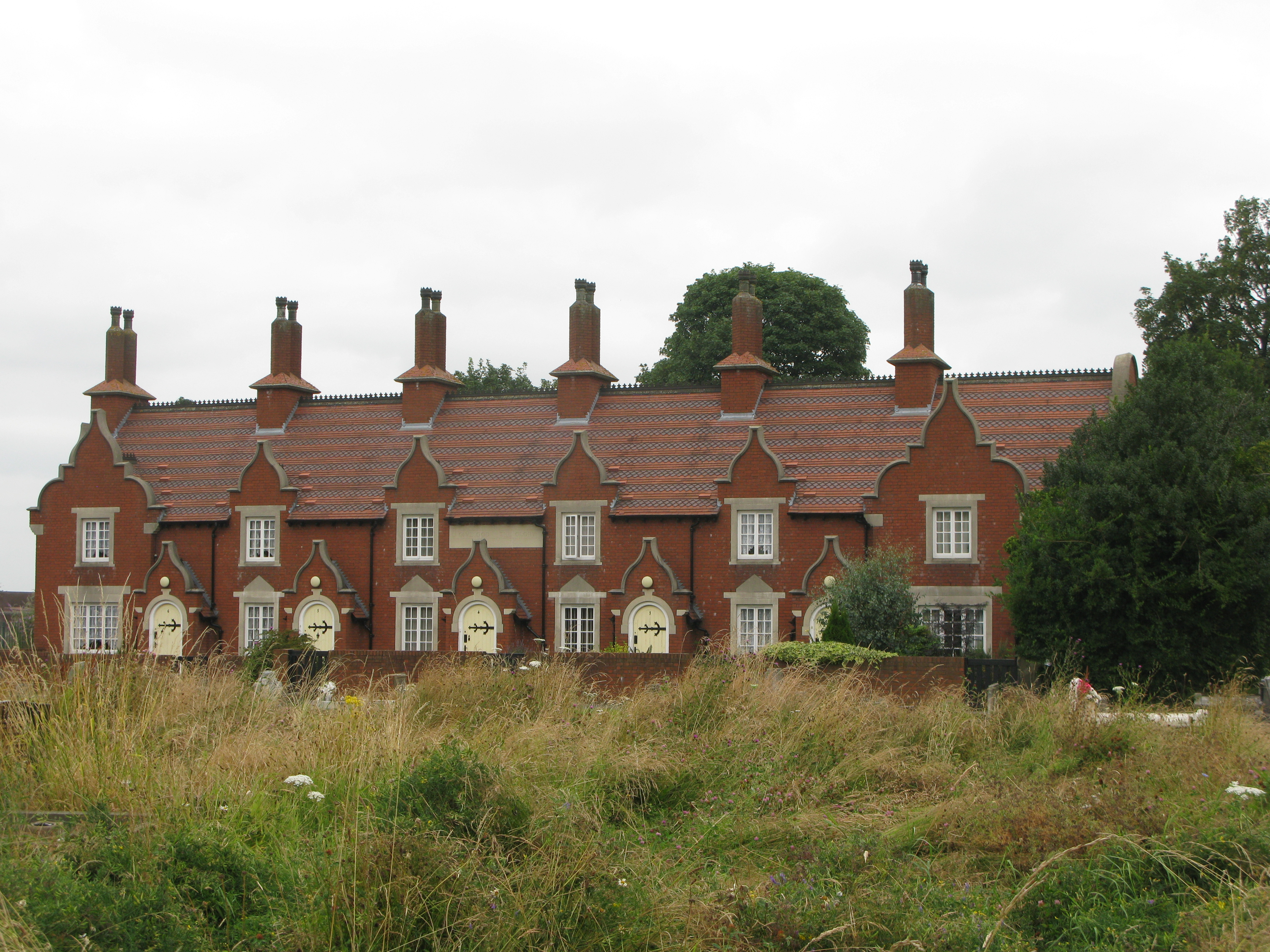
Heath Town Almshouses

A terrace of six, grade II listed, 19th century almshouses is located in the graveyard of Holy Trinity Church. They were built in 1850 by the benevolent industrialist Henry Rogers. After a period of dereliction, the houses were restored in 1996 to one bedroom houses for elderly people.

=== Victoria Hall ===
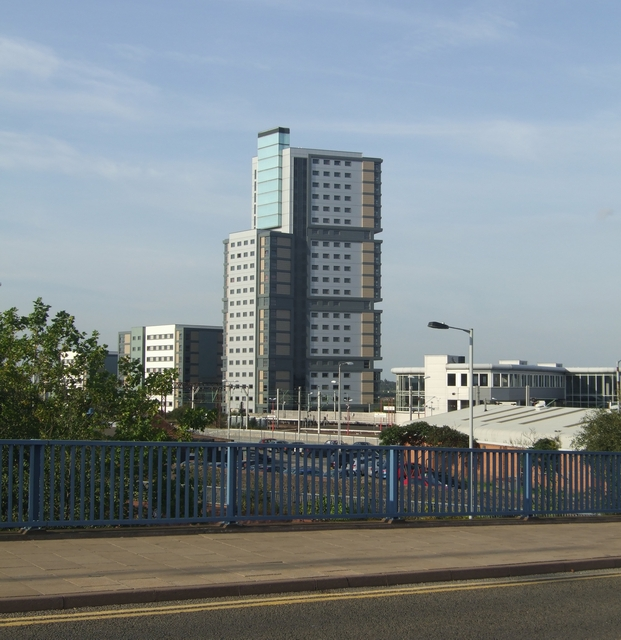
Victoria Hall, University of Wolverhampton - student accommodation

Victoria Hall is a block of student accommodation with four tower blocks in the Springfield area of Heath Town. The tallest block is 25 stories and when built in 2009 was the tallest modular building in Europe.

== Housing ==
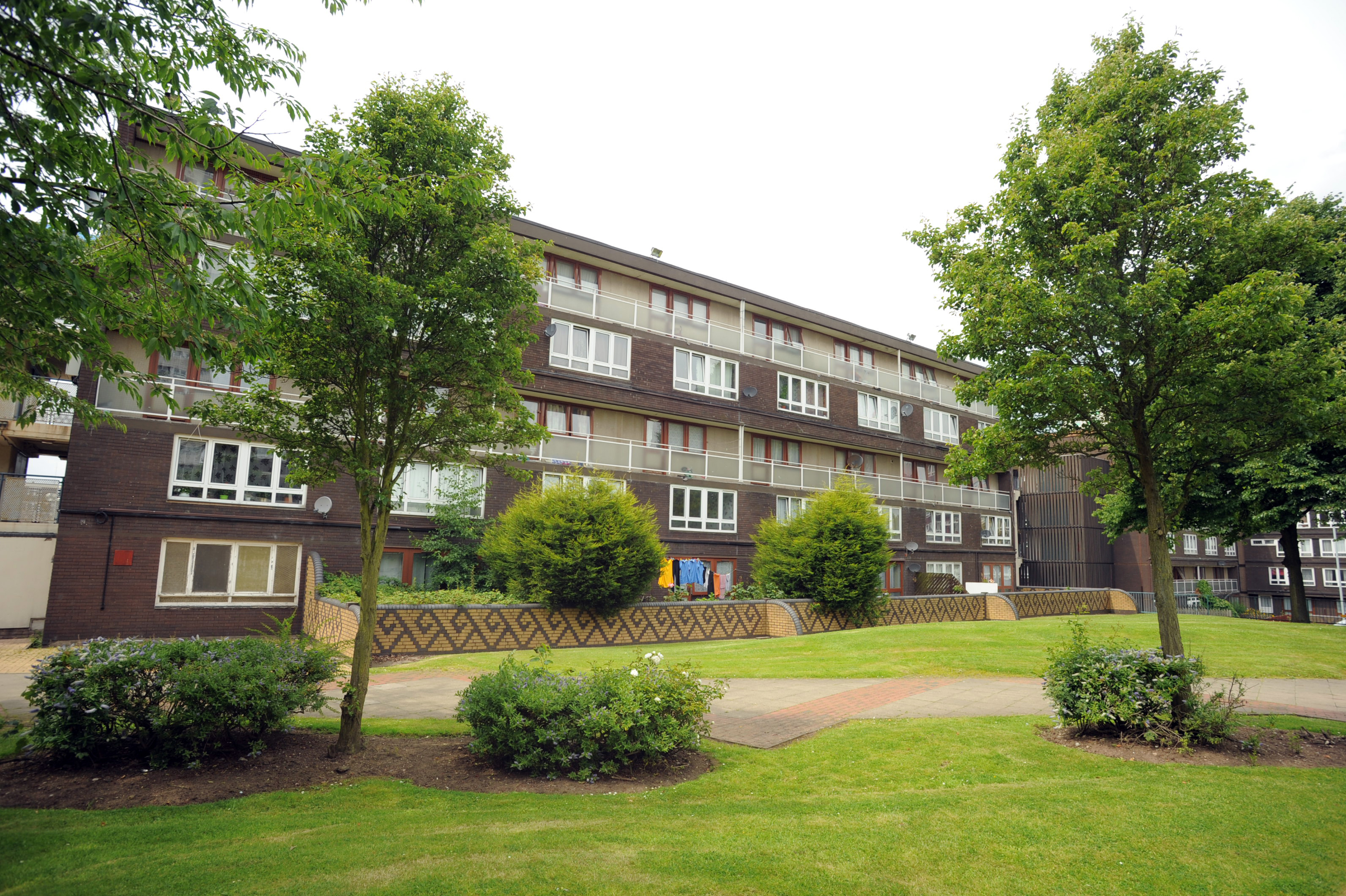
Some of the 1960s flats in Heath Town surrounded by trees and landscaped areas.

The area is mainly residential fronting on Wednesfield Road and in the centre of the estate itself. One of the last estates of tower blocks to be built in the area, it incorporated a number of features – a district heating scheme and deck level access. The estate's tower blocks were for a long time the city's tallest residential structures and are visible landmarks from some distance. The blocks of flats are divided by grassed areas, the largest of which is in the south-central part of the development and designed for recreational use. The estate includes a variety of other housing types—including two-storey houses and low-rise maisonettes. Green space has been incorporated into the areas between blocks of flats and mature trees are visible along the southern edge of the estate.

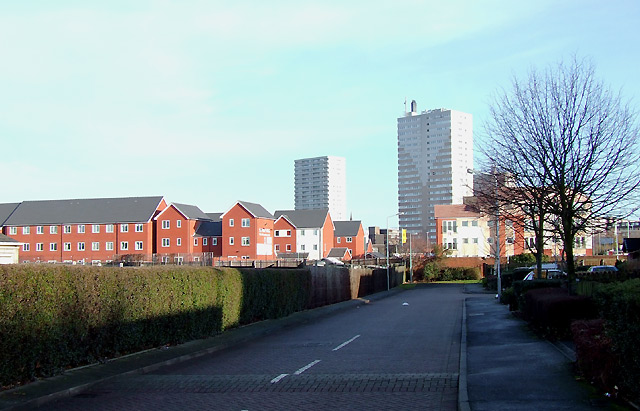
New housing development in Heath Town

There is an extensive housing development off the Wednesfield Road on the former site of the Chubb Works which was part of the new century's Wolverhampton regeneration plan.

The 2011 census shows housing types as:

- 47% purpose built flats
- 24% semi-detached houses
- 22% terraced houses
- 6% detached
- 1% converted or shared house
- 1% flats/apartments in commercial buildings.

== Education ==
Primary Schools in Heath Town are:

- Stephen's Church of England Primary School
- Woden Primary School
- Trinity Church of England Primary School

The Secondary school is the highly rated Heath Park.

== Sport ==
Heath Town Swimming Club was originally based at Heath Town Baths but now meets at the nearby Wolverhampton Swimming and Fitness Centre.

Heath Town is home to Heath Town United Football Club.

== Transport ==
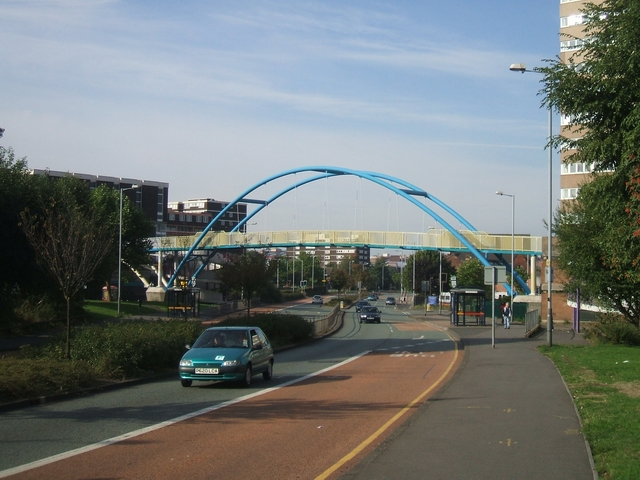
Footbridge over the Wednesfield Road

=== Roads ===
Heath Town straddles the A4124 Wolverhampton-Wednesfield Road, which runs westwards to Wolverhampton and eastwards to Bloxwich and eventually Brownhills It is bounded by railway lines to the north-east and south (the latter disused). Wolverhampton Railway Station is located in Heath Town.

=== Railway ===
Wolverhampton station originally opened on 1 July 1852 by the Birmingham, Wolverhampton and Stour Valley Railway, a subsidiary of the London and North Western Railway (LNWR); it was named Wolverhampton Queen Street. It was known as Wolverhampton High Level from 1 June 1885. From 1923, it was operated by the London Midland and Scottish Railway (LMS), and in 1948 the station became part of the London Midland Region of British Railways. The present Wolverhampton station dates from 1965, when the High Level station was completely rebuilt as part of the modernisation programme which saw the West Coast Main Line electrified.

The former Heath Town railway station, on the line from High Level to Wednesfield station, was just off Grove Street. Built by the Wolverhampton and Walsall Railway in 1872, and was operated by the Midland Railway from 1876, it closed in 1910.

Wolverhampton Low Level Station was opened 1854 by the Oxford, Worcester and Wolverhampton Railway later to fall under the auspices of the Great Western Railway. It was closed to passengers in 1972, but continued to function as a parcels depot until 1981. Once an important stop on the London-Birkenhead line and linked with Snow Hill station in Birmingham. However, the station buildings were listed in 1986. The building has since been redeveloped as a venue for weddings, banquets & conferences.

=== Buses ===
Frequent National Express West Midlands services 9 and 59 run from the city centre to Heath Town and on to New Cross, Bentley Bridge and Walsall (9) or Ashmore Park (59). Chaserider service 71 provides an hourly service during weekday morning and early afternoon from Wolverhampton City Centre to Wood End, Essington, Cheslyn Hay and Cannock. Diamond Bus service 65 operates from Wolverhampton through Heath Town and onto Wood End, Bushbury and Fordhouses. Travel Express (T/A Let's Go) held the tender for service 65 for several years until 2024.

=== Canal ===
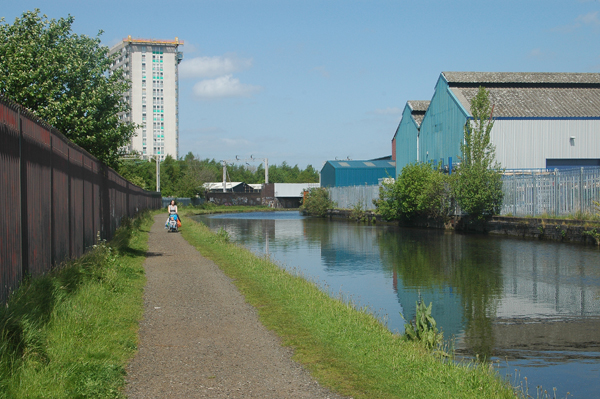
Wyrley & Essington canal near Heath Town

The Wyrley and Essington Canal passes through Heath Town. The canal runs from Wolverhampton via Wednesfield towards the coalfields at Essington and Great Wyrley, Bloxwich, Pelsall and Chasewater.

== Future Plans ==
=== Heath Town Master Plan ===
In 2013 the Heath Town Master Plan was unveiled setting out plans to increase the provision of housing by up to 550, improve community facilities and enhance landscaping.

=== Heath Town Neighbourhood Plan ===
Heathfield Park Neighbourhood Plan received a resounding yes vote on 17 July 2014 and was taken to Wolverhampton City Council in September 2014 for adoption. The Plan will help to shape all future planning applications for the Springfield, New Park Village, Heath Town and New Cross areas of Heath Town. The Plan identifies six key themes for improving and sustaining the area which focus on identity and image, housing and environment, employment and skills, assets and buildings, transport and traffic and healthy living.

This is one of Wolverhampton's first neighbourhood plans (with Tettenhall) and puts Wolverhampton at the forefront of neighbourhood planning nationally. Wolverhampton is the first metropolitan area to hold a neighbourhood plan referendum and the first anywhere to hold a referendum with more than one area taking part. The plan was created by residents from Heathfield Park via their local neighbourhood partnerships, with support from the council's planning, housing and neighbourhood services teams.

In March 2015, Wolverhampton Council announced that the maisonettes in Chervil Rise would be demolished as part of the regeneration, resulting in 34 tenants having to leave the estate.

== Famous Residents ==
- Tom Barrett (1891–1924) - riding mechanic, born and buried in Heath Town.
- Don Howe (1935–2015) - English football player, turned coach and manager, born in Springfield.
- Brian Pendleton (1944–2001) - musician born in Heath Town.
- Paulette Wilson (1956–2020) - Jamaica-born immigrant rights activist, lived latterly in Heath Town.
- Goldie (born 1965) - electronic music artist, disc jockey, visual artist and actor, member of the breakdance crew Westside, based in Heath Town.
