= Graiseley =

Area of Wolverhampton, England

Coordinates: 52.5771°N 2.1350°W

Graiseley is both an inner-city area of Wolverhampton, situated immediately to the south-west of the city centre, and the name of a ward of Wolverhampton City Council.

== Place-name ==
The most likely origin of the Graiseley name is from the Old English grǣg (grey wolf) and lēah (woodland clearing), meaning 'the lēah with the wolves'.

== Graiseley ward ==
Graiseley ward is bounded by Penn Road (A449) to the east, Coalway Road and Church Road to the south, Bradmore Road and Merridale Road to the west and the ring road to the north. The population of this ward as taken at the 2011 census was 12,284.

Confusingly, the area of Graiseley straddles its namesake council ward and neighbouring Blakenhall ward.

Graiseley is home to parks, shopping centres and schools, along with sub-urban and inner city housing.

Areas within the ward include:

- part of Graiseley
- Penn Fields
- Merridale
- Chapel Ash
- and part of Bradmore.

It borders the St Peter's, Blakenhall, Penn, Merry Hill and Park wards. It forms part of the Wolverhampton West constituency.

== Schools ==
The area is served by three state primary schools: Graiseley, Aston and Merridale.

Penn Fields School is a special school located in the area and there is a Resource Area for Moderate Learning Difficulties at Graisely Primary School.

The Junior School of The Royal School, Wolverhampton also lies in the ward.

== Graiseley Brook ==
The Graiseley Brook is a small river that drains the area. It originally rose to the rear of the present Merridale School site and flowed across the Merridale and Compton areas to join the Smestow Brook, part of the River Severn catchment. Much of the course is now culverted.

== See also ==
City of Wolverhampton Council elections
