= Penn Fields =

Coordinates: 52.5704°N 2.1454°W

- Interactive map of Penn Fields
- Country: England
- County: West Midlands
- Ward: Graiseley

Penn Fields is an area to the south west of the City of Wolverhampton, West Midlands (historically in Staffordshire), within the Graiseley ward. It lies on the western side of Penn Road, the A449 trunk road to Kidderminster. The housing stock varies from modest terraced homes to large detached residences. Notable buildings include the Bingley Enterprise Centre and Bantock Primary School.

In April 2021, a planning application was submitted to demolish the Quality Hotel on the corner of Penn Road and Oaklands Road and construct a Lidl supermarket on the site.

Roads of note include Lea Road, Jeffcock Road, Owen Road and Penn Road. Over the last decade, the area has suffered with a number of social issues. A number of incidents involving antisocial behaviour, a mysterious explosion and shootings have tarnished Penn Fields' reputation.

== Demographics ==
The community is racially very mixed. In the Penn Fields area there is a diverse culture with a mix of various cultures. Since 2007, a number of Slovaks, Polish, Czechs, Russians, Roma, Albanians and Lithuanians have moved into the area.
