= Bradmore, West Midlands =

Suburb of Wolverhampton, England

Coordinates: 52.5767°N 2.1554°W

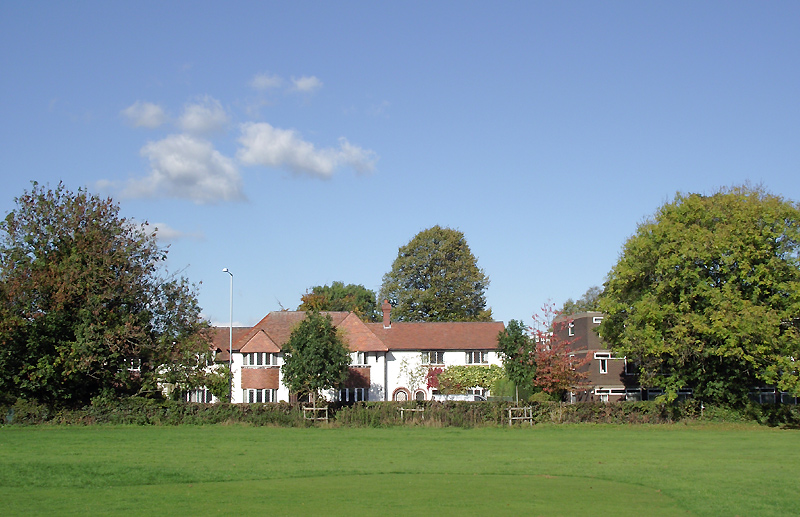
Bantock Park, Bradmore

Bradmore is a suburb of Wolverhampton in the West Midlands of England. It lies at the meeting point of the Graiseley, Park and Merry Hill wards of Wolverhampton City Council.

Bradmore is home to Bantock Park, the former grounds of Bantock House which is now a museum owned by the city council. Enoch Powell formerly lived in a house overlooking the park. In the centre of Bradmore is the Bradmore Arms pub, currently owned by Greene King as part of the Hungry Horse chain, and was built in 1926. Originally called the Bradmore Inn, it was in fact located on the opposite side of the road where the current shops now exist. The Bradmore Arms has also seen a number of building changes as it has changed hands through different companies including Whitbread and M&B. The Bradmore Arms also survived demolition, following an application for planning permission submitted to convert the site into a supermarket.

Many of the houses in Bradmore were built in or around the early 1920s.

The area is well served by buses with service 4 operating between Spring Hill and the i54 via the city centre while service 3 operates between Castlecroft and Fordhouses via the City Centre. Diamond Bus service 63 runs between Wolverhampton and Oxbarn Avenue serving the local estates to the east of Bradmore Road.
