= Low Hill =

Coordinates: 52.6106°N 2.1137°W

- Location within the West Midlands
- Population: 2,888 (2001 Census - Low Hill Priority Neighbourhood)
- Metropolitan borough: Wolverhampton
- Metropolitan county: West Midlands
- Region: West Midlands
- Country: England
- Sovereign state: United Kingdom
- Post town: WOLVERHAMPTON
- Postcode district: WV10
- Dialling code: 01902
- Police: West Midlands
- Fire: West Midlands
- Ambulance: West Midlands
- UK Parliament: Wolverhampton North East

Low Hill is in Wolverhampton, West Midlands, England. It is north-east of Wolverhampton city centre, within the Bushbury South and Low Hill ward.

== Place name & history ==
The place name, Low Hill comes from Old English 'hlæw', meaning tumulus or mound - often those used for burial, with hill added at a later date. The antiquary, John Huntbach, noted that the Battle of Tettenhall/Wednesfield was likely fought in the vicinity of Low Hill, quoting the names of several lows in the vicinity - the North Lowe, the South Lowe, Horslowe (in the area of Horseley Fields - where the name comes from), Little Lowe, Tromelow (the more recent local name 'Rumbelows' comes from this), and so on.

The land was purchased by Wolverhampton Council for housing development in 1924 to enable the construction of new homes to let to families being rehoused from town centre slums. More than 2,000 houses were built at Low Hill between 1925 and 1929, making it one of the largest housing estates in the country at the time, and by far the largest in Wolverhampton.

Prior to the 1920s, the area was rural, with scattered farms and houses such as Showell Farm, Low Hill House, Old Fallings Farm and Old Fallings Hall connected by a series of ancient bridleways. When the new estate was built, a new road layout obliterated the old routes and changed the landscape.

The estate was conveniently located for people working in the local manufacturing industry, particularly the Guy Motors bus factory in Park Lane and the Goodyear plant in Stafford Road. As late as 1971, unemployment in Low Hill was a mere 4%, although there was concern among local residents about the deteriorating condition of housing on the estate, largely blamed on the council's alleged failure to maintain the properties to an adequate level.

Low Hill was a popular destination for Wolverhampton's Commonwealth immigrant population, with more than 200 such families living there by the 1970s. However, these immigrants were not well received by the pre-existing community, and the Borough Council enforced an unwritten rule which segregated the West Indians inhabitants from the White ones in different parts of the estate - this was still visible into the 1990s.

However, the recession of the mid-1970s saw unemployment on the estate rise, and unemployment rose again in the early 1980s as a result of another recession. The closure of the Guy Motors factory in 1982 was easily the biggest blow to hit the workforce of Low Hill. By this stage, local crime rates were rising and Low Hill was widely regarded as one of the worst districts of Wolverhampton.

Further local factory closures in the early 2000s saw unemployment on the estate reach around 15%, at a time when the national unemployment rate was around 5%, one major blow at this time being the downsizing of the Goodyear factory. The recession of 2008 and 2009 saw unemployment rise even higher.

== Today ==
The centre of Low Hill is situated around Showell Circus. The Bushbury Arms public house was built during the 1930s and closed in 2013, but the building was retained and incorporated into a new housing development in 2015. Showell Circus is the first traffic island in the United Kingdom to be awarded Village green status.

The western part of Low Hill is currently being redeveloped. In the late 2000s, over 90 houses around Fifth Avenue were demolished and a police base, NHS walk-in centre and multi-sport ball court were built in their place along with a new upmarket housing development, which extends also into ground vacant from the demolition of a disused factory. Low Hill is also within walking distance of the Wolverhampton Science Park, created in the late 1990s on the site of Wolverhampton Gas Works and Gorsebrook House.

In 2010, 50 new affordable 'eco' homes were built at Showell Park.

Low Hill is well known locally for the extravagant Christmas decorations, which can be seen on many houses in the area in the run up to Christmas every year.

Low Hill is often in the news for crime and youth gangs. It also has a high level of unemployment. In 2006 there was a Local Neighbourhood Partnership (LNP) covering Low Hill and neighbouring estates like the Scotlands to tackle the area's many problems and bring the community together more. The LNP closed down in 2016.
