= Warstones =

Area of Wolverhampton, England

Coordinates: 52.567°N 2.167°W

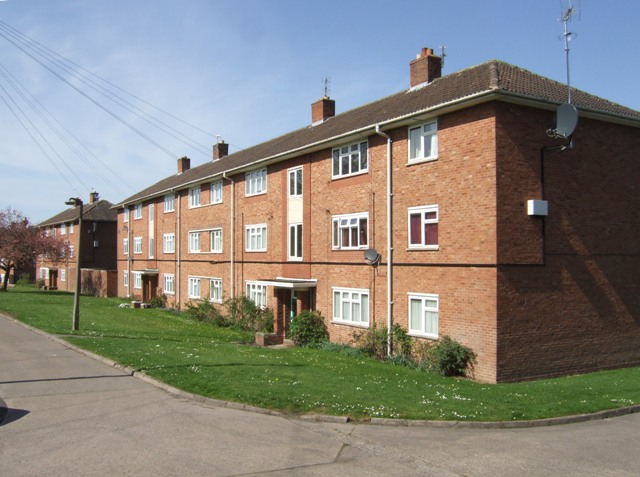
Council housing at Warstones Gardens

Warstones is a suburban area of Wolverhampton, England, situated to the south-west of the city centre. It is home to Warstones Wanderers F.C.

Warstones has three schools, within half a mile of each other: Highfields School, Springdale and Warstones. Not far away are Smestow School sports college and Colton Hills Community School.

There is also a youth centre; the YWCA.

Warstones has many facilities such as a library and many shops.

It is the location of some of Wolverhampton's first post World War II council houses, built around Enville Road in the second half of the 1940s.

In the past few years there have been some problems in the area. Gang culture was a major issue. West Midlands Police tackled the problem by putting a curfew on the area for a short while and putting a police station in the area.

Notable former residents of Warstones Estate include Slade guitarist Dave Hill and journalist and writer Caitlin Moran. Another well known resident was Peter Knowles who boarded on the estate when he came to play for Wolves.
