= Finchfield =

Coordinates: 52.578520°N 2.1758595°W

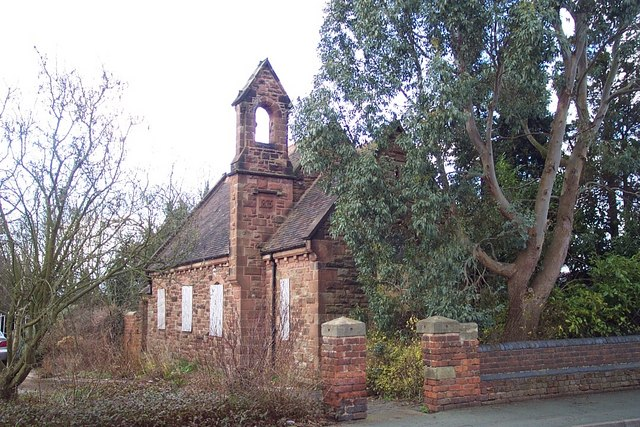
- Redundant Church at Finchfield

- Flag

- Location within the West Midlands
- OS grid reference: SO881978
- Metropolitan borough: City of Wolverhampton
- Metropolitan county: West Midlands
- Region: West Midlands
- Country: England
- Sovereign state: United Kingdom
- Post town: Wolverhampton
- Postcode district: WV3
- Dialling code: 01902
- Police: West Midlands
- Fire: West Midlands
- Ambulance: West Midlands
- UK Parliament: Wolverhampton West

Finchfield is a suburb of Wolverhampton, West Midlands, England. It is located south-west of the city centre, within the Tettenhall Wightwick Ward between the Merry Hill and Tettenhall Regis Wards of Wolverhampton City Council. Many of the streets have arboreal/plant related names.

== History ==
Finchfield was a small village before the early 20th century, when parcels of agricultural land and the gardens and grounds of gentlemen were sold off for housing. Until 1974, Finchfield was a district of South Staffordshire.

== Churches ==
Windmill Community Church is a non-denominational Christian church.

== Library ==
Finchfield library was one of nine Wolverhampton libraries that the City Council planned to close or merge under plans to create 'community hubs' in the city. In November 2012, after a consultation showed strong opposition, the council announced that Finchfield library and some others would remain open.

== Facilities ==
Westacre Infant school and Uplands Junior school are situated in this area. There are also two public houses, "The Chestnut Tree" and "Westacres".

In the centre of Finchfield is a Lidl supermarket. In 2013 this was the subject to a public inquiry after it appealed refusal of planning permission to extend the store that would have led to the demolition of a Victorian era property. The Planning Inspectorate finally granted permission for the extension.

== Crime and local reaction ==
There have been several criminal incidents around the shopping parade at Finchfield Road West, notably an armed robbery at the Co-Op store in September 2012. In response residents, with the backing of West Midlands Police, set up a 'Shopwatch' to record incidents of anti-social behaviour, graffiti and fly tipping.
