= All Saints, Wolverhampton =

Coordinates: 52.579°N 02.120°W

All Saints
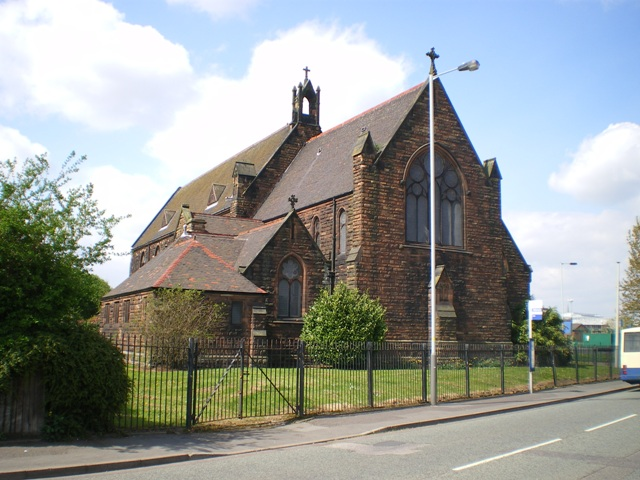
- All Saints' Church

- Location within the West Midlands
- Interactive map of All Saints
- Metropolitan borough: Wolverhampton
- Metropolitan county: West Midlands
- Region: West Midlands
- Country: England
- Sovereign state: United Kingdom
- Post town: Wolverhampton
- Postcode district: WV2 1
- Dialling code: 01902
- Police: West Midlands
- Fire: West Midlands
- Ambulance: West Midlands

All Saints is an inner city area of Wolverhampton, West Midlands, England. It is situated immediately to the south-east of the city centre, in the city council's Ettingshall ward.

The first All Saints Church and school was built in 1864 on Steelhouse Lane. The Rev. Henry Hampton of St John's Church, Wolverhampton was its first minister. The current church was designed by London architects T. Taylor Smith & G. F. Roper in the early gothic style and consecrated in 1879. A separate parish was formed two years later. The church building was extensively added to in 1892–3. The church is part of the ecclesiastical parish of Central Wolverhampton. The nave of the church has been partitioned off and is used by a community group. The former All Saints' Infants and Junior School, which opened in 1894 stands next to the church. The school closed in 2002 with pupils transferring to Grove Primary School on Caledonia Road. In 2008 the school building was repurposed as a community facility operated by social enterprise, All Saints Action Network.

The neighbourhood mostly consists of late 19th century and early 20th century terraced houses, which are mainly inhabited by Sikh and Ravidassia immigrants from the Indian sub-continent. Modern landmarks in the area include, Ford and Nissan car dealerships, a bowling alley and a Fitness First public gym. The Royal Hospital, Wolverhampton, which closed in June 1997, is situated in the area; It was sold for residential development in 2016.

It is a fairly deprived area with high levels of crime and unemployment, with much of the housing stock in a dismal condition. As recently as the 1980s, many houses in the area were lacking bathrooms and indoor toilets. Since then, a significant number of these older properties have been demolished.

Mount Zion 7th Day Church of God has a fellowship on Caledonia Road and hosts a food bank. On the same road are Grove Primary School and its neighbour, St Mary and St John's Catholic Primary Academy. Pond Lane Mission Hall, a tin tabernacle was established in 1896 in the parish of St Luke's, Blakenhall.

The former premises of James Baker & Sons Ltd, boot manufacturers stands on Vicarage Road and Cleveland Road. The business started out in 1850 making industrial footwear, but later changed to boots and shoes. The factory dates from 1861 and was extended to Powlett Street in 1898. It is Grade II listed and has a courtyard plan. The firm closed in the 1970s.

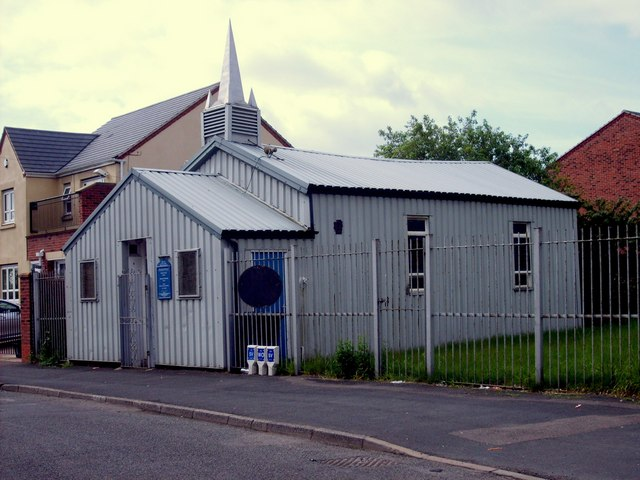
Pond Lane Mission Hall

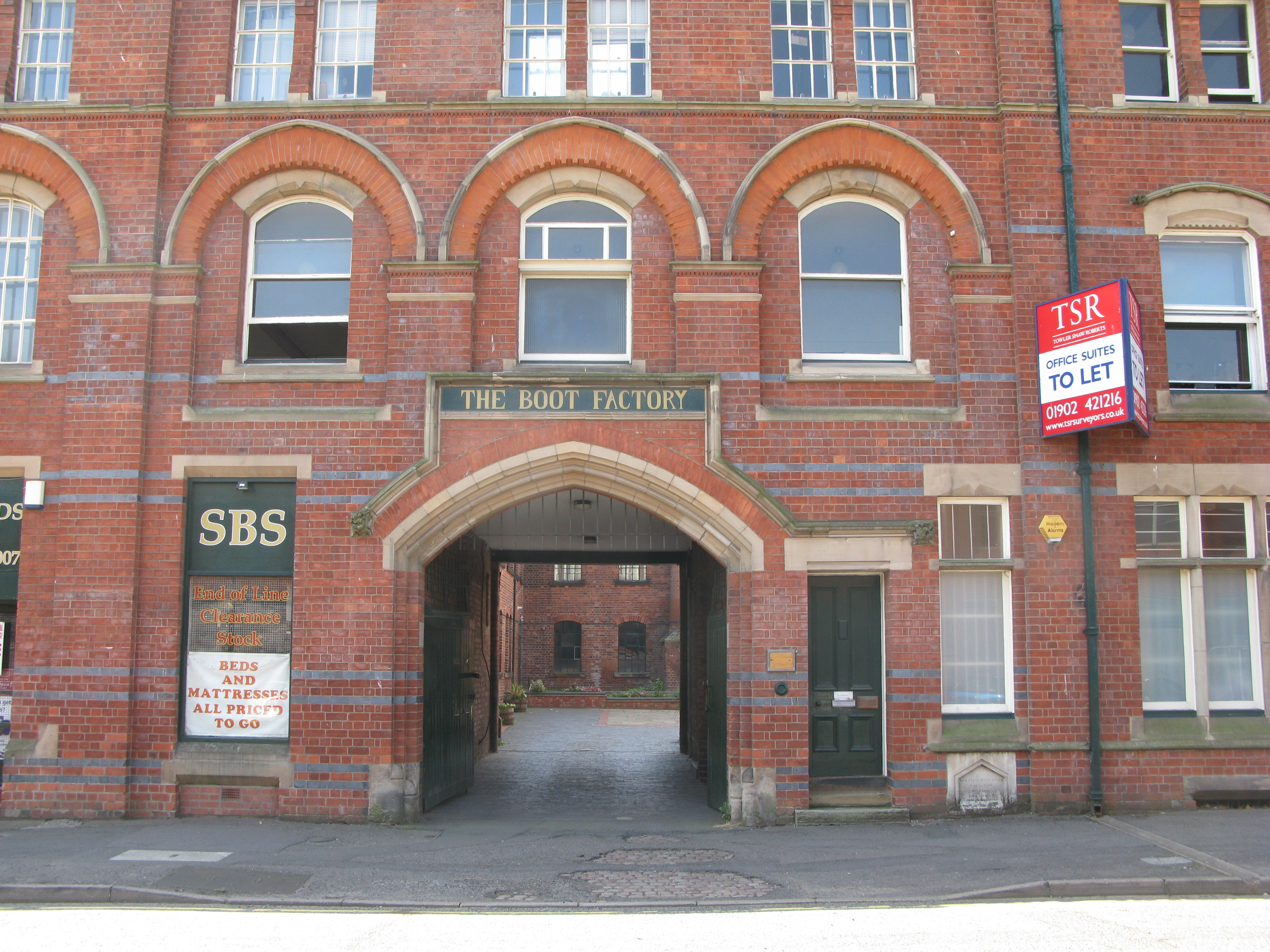
James Baker's factory entrance
