= Wood End, Wolverhampton =

Suburb in Wolverhampton, West Midlands, England

Coordinates: 52.609°N 2.081°W

Wood End is a suburb of Wolverhampton, West Midlands, England. It is situated 3 miles (5 km) north-east of the city centre, adjacent to the border with Staffordshire, near to Wednesfield.

The centre of the district is the shopping area close to Wood End Primary School which includes a One Stop convenience store and other local shops. The area is served by services 65, 69, 57 and 25 which are operated by National Express West Midlands, Chaserider and Diamond Bus.

It lies where the wards of Fallings Park and Wednesfield North meet.
