= East Park, Wolverhampton =

Park in Wolverhampton, England

Coordinates: 52.582°N 2.094°W

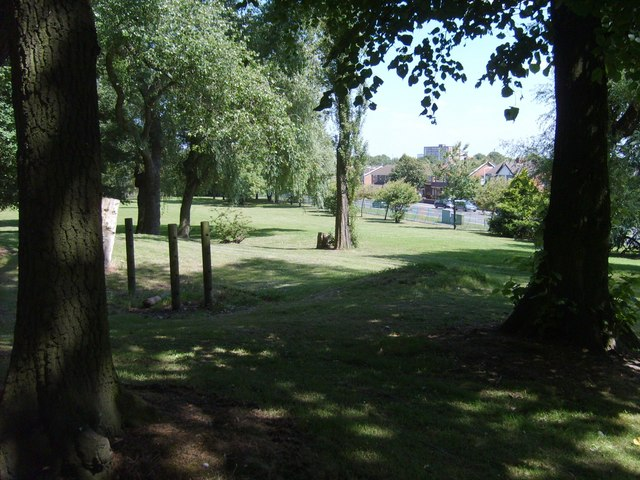
View in East Park

East Park is a public park in Wolverhampton, England. Situated off Hickman Avenue, near Monmore Green stadium, the park has good transport links to the city centre.

Work began on the original design "Utile Dolci" by Thomas Mawson on 18 hectares of land donated by the Duke of Sutherland, Sir Alfred Hickman, and Mr Arther Sparrow in 1892, with the park opening for business on 21 September 1896.

The original design included a boating lake; however this was beset with problems as old coal mines that were previously there began to drain the water from the lake. Despite great efforts to save the lake, it was grassed over in 1922 and is now part of a children's playground and all weather sports pitch. This has since been turned into a car park in 2013.

The park includes The Lysaght Memorial Clock Tower, however this has been out of order for over 30 years although rumors continue to circulate that funding will become available to refurbish this in the near future (Work started in 2013), and a small band stand originally funded by the proceeds of a floral fete. Although presently (2012) repairable according to The Scottish Ironwork Database (https://web.archive.org/web/20120512104228/http://www.scottishironwork.org/catdetail.asp?ironid=25956) the bandstand is currently considered to be "at risk" having suffered years of neglect and vandalism. Pensioners often gather at the Memorial Clock Tower for sandwich club.

Current facilities include football pitches, tennis courts, children's playgrounds, cycle speedway, fitness and exercise equipment alongside gardens, walkways and flower beds.. The playground underwent a £630,000 complete renovation in 2023, adding a new splash park and play equipment.

Once a year, the Wolvestock4life festival takes place. It has been hosted by East park for over ten years and annually brings in over 4,000 people. The festival, now in its 14th year, is the largest free-to-enter festival in the United Kingdom. It has no longer free since 2013.

A Lottery grant of £981,000 was granted in December 2011 to stabilize the aforementioned coal mines and refurbish the park's facilities, including the clock tower.
