= Broadgate Park =

Self-catering hall of residence, University of Nottingham, England

Coordinates: 52.9335°N 1.206°W

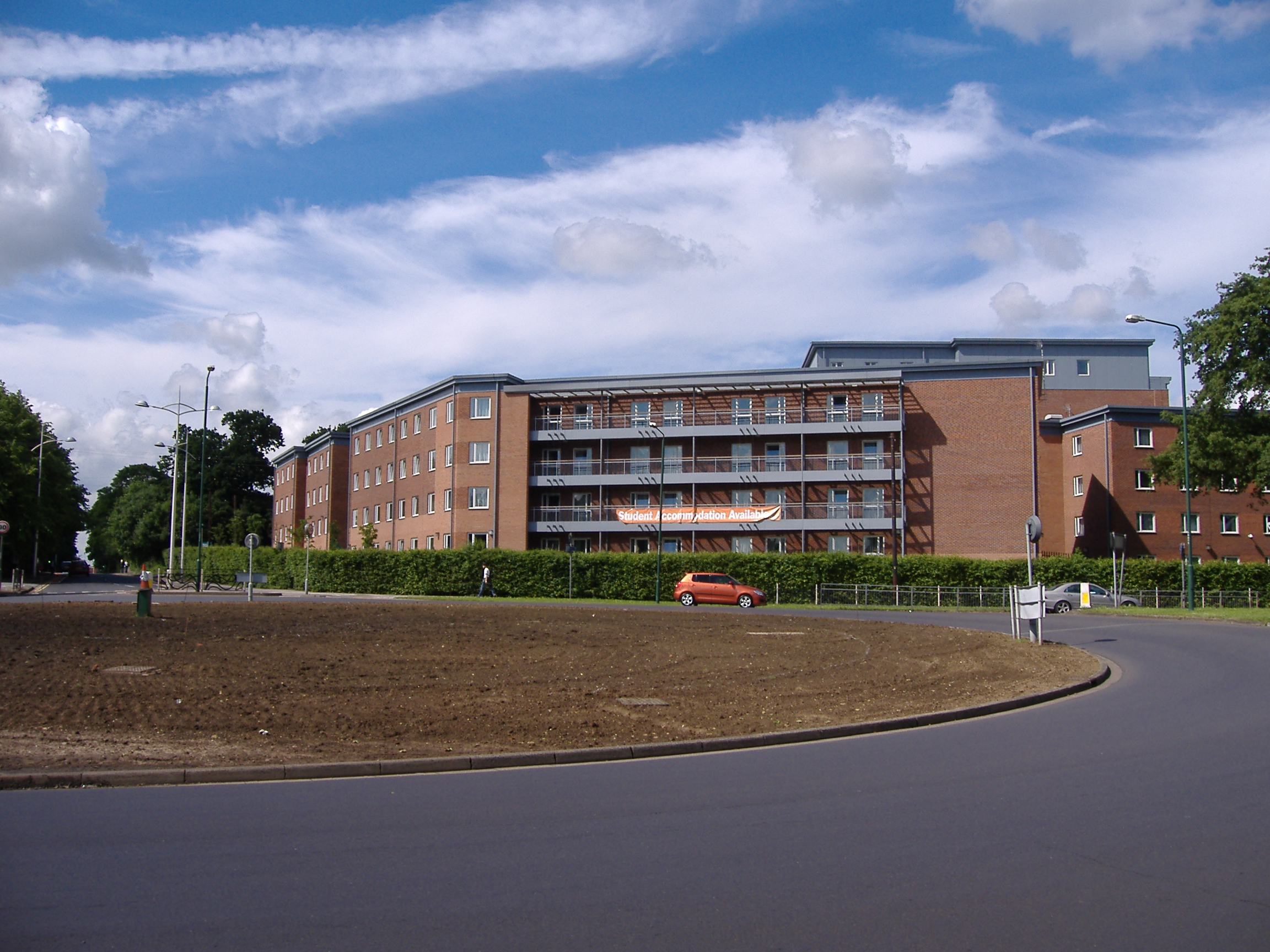
Broadgate Park, by the west entrance of the University of Nottingham

Broadgate Park is a self-catering hall of residence at the University of Nottingham, accommodating undergraduate and postgraduate students. Housing about 2,400 students and containing 2,223 rooms, it is one of the largest student villages in Europe. It is located outside of the west entrance of the University Park campus. It is owned and maintained by University Partnerships Programme.

== Block names ==
The majority of blocks in Broadgate Park have botanical names, such as those of various trees or flowers:

- Acorns
- Alders
- Alpines
- Beeches
- Birches
- Cedars
- Cherries
- Chestnuts
- Conifers
- Coppers
- Elms
- Firs
- Hawthornes
- Hazels
- Hemlocks
- Hollies
- Junipers
- Larches
- Laurels
- Lilies
- Limes
- Magnolia
- Maples
- Mulberries
- Oaks
- Pines
- Planes
- Poplars
- Redwoods
- Rowans
- Salthouse
- Salthouse Close
- Spindles
- Spruces
- Sycamores
- Walnuts
- Willows

== History ==
In 2009 UPP announced a £115 million transaction with the University of Nottingham. Under this agreement UPP agreed to provide 850 student bedrooms.

Under an agreement between UPP and the University of Nottingham ownership of the accommodation will be transferred to the University in the year 2047/48.

== JCR ==
The Broadgate Park JCR represents the residents of Broadgate Park, as well as Albion House, in nearby Beeston and Cloister House, in Dunkirk — two other third-party halls owned by UPP Broadgate Park.

== See also ==
- University of Nottingham Halls of Residence
