= Barrow-in-Furness Higher Grade School =

School in Cumbria, England

Coordinates: 54.1098°N 3.2248°W

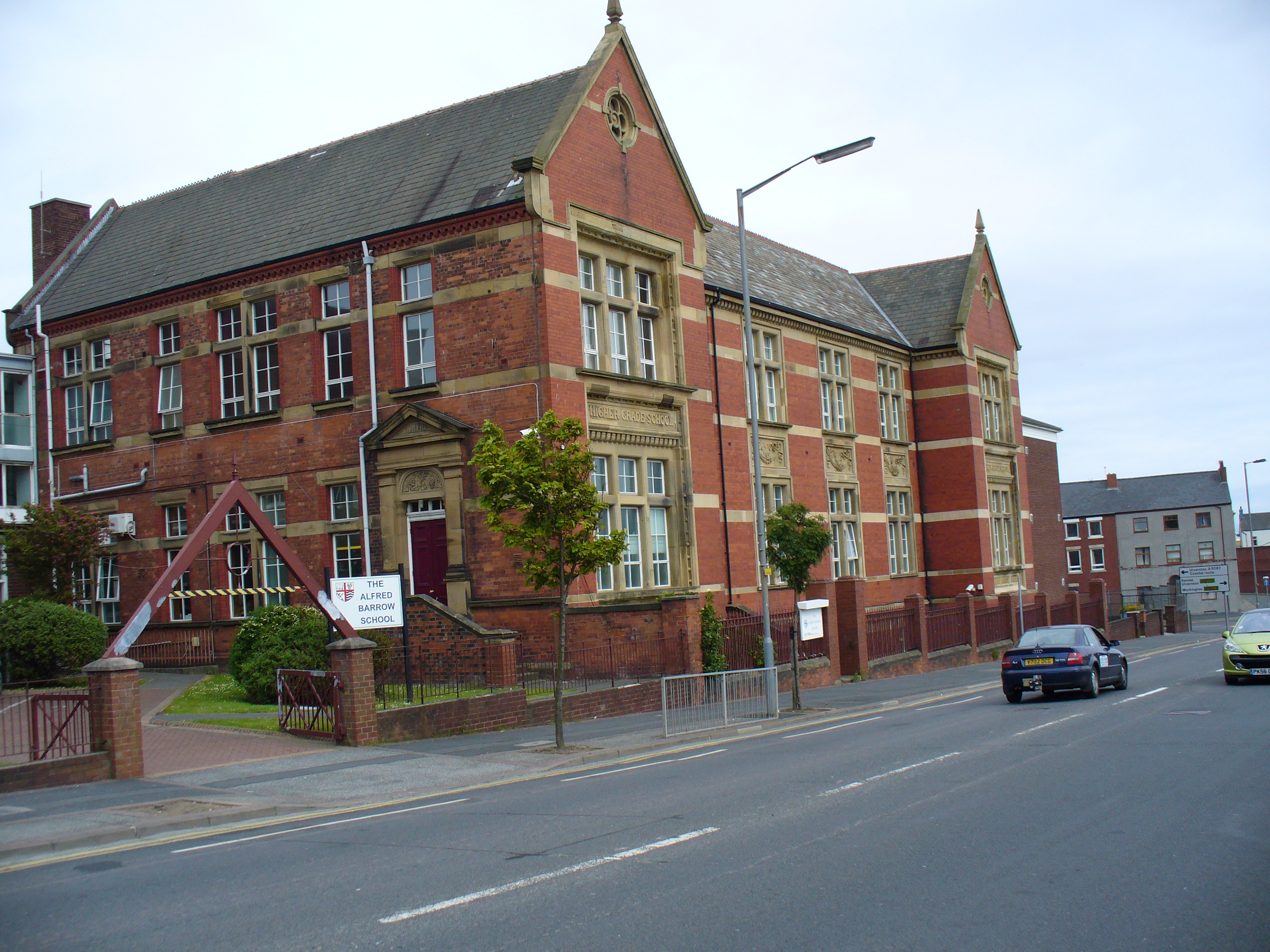
The Higher Grade School building

The Higher Grade School building in Barrow-in-Furness, Cumbria, England is Grade II listed and has functioned as a number of educational institutions throughout its long history. From completion until 1930 the building was occupied by the Barrow Higher Grade School.

== Barrow Higher Grade School ==
The School opened in the late 1890s as a Higher Grade School. At the time it was Barrow's only High School.

== Alfred Barrow Boys' and Girls' School ==
A new building was opened in the 1930s adjacent to the original building, to form separate Boys' and Girls' schools; Alfred Barrow Boys' School and Alfred Barrow Girls' School. The original Higher Grade School building became the Girls' School and the adjacent building became the Boys' School.

In the 1950s and 1960s, the school underwent further change, the Boys' School was moved to a new site at Holker Street in Barrow, and the Boys' School building at the main site was demolished. New extension blocks were built at the main site.

== Alfred Barrow Comprehensive School ==
In the 1970s a new science block and gym were opened at the main site, and the segregation of gender ceased. This formed the Alfred Barrow Comprehensive School. Initially the Holker Street Site (Formerly the Boys' School) became the lower School for years 1 to 3, and the Main Site became the upper School. In the mid 1980s the Holker Street Site was closed, and the Main Site became the Alfred Barrow Comprehensive School on one site. The school's image diminished during the late 1990s. In 2003 the Department of Education wrote to Cumbria County Council recommending that Alfred Barrow School is closed down. However, after a campaign the School was saved. However, it was decided that there would be a major overhaul of the educational provision in Furness, which ultimately led to the creation of Furness Academy. The second campaign to save the school, as well as 2 other Barrow secondary schools was unsuccessful. In September 2009 Alfred Barrow School closed and the children moved to the new Furness Academy at Parkview and Thorncliffe. The last headteacher was Dr. Linda Potts, who had managed to successfully lead the School out of special measures within its last year.

== St. George's School ==
Between 2009 and 2010 the former Alfred Barrow School was renovated substantially, so it would be suitable for use as a temporary Primary School. St. Georges School moved into the original Higher Grade School building in September 2010 whilst their School was refurbished. They returned to their refurbished School in September 2011.

== Barrow Island Community Primary School ==
Barrow Island School moved into the original Higher Grade School building in September 2011 whilst another Barrow Primary School was refurbished. The Barrow Island School was to undergo a more substantial redevelopment than the previous St Georges, and therefore the School was based there for two years. They returned in September 2013.

== Future ==
The site was put on the market in July 2013 when the Barrow Island School departed, and in December 2013 a buyer was found. Planning was sought in late 2015 for the construction of a 'super surgery', called Alfred Barrow Health Centre, and planning was granted in May 2016. The plan involved the demolition of the buildings later additions, while preserving the original building, to make way for 5000m2 of modern 'fit for purpose' space. This houses the Cumbria Clinical Commissioning Group, Community Services (e.g. Community and specialist nursing, mental health, physiotherapy, podiatry, diabetes, retinal screening), Integrated Children's Services, Occupational Health services for BAE Systems, space for third sector organisations, a new response base for the North-West Ambulance Service, and three GP practices as well as a pharmacy. The three GP practices in the building are Abbey Road Surgery, Atkinson Health Centre and Risedale Surgery. Work to clear the site started in July 2016 but construction was stalled multiple times until early February 2018 when contractors Esh Border finally moved onto the site. Work is now complete.
