= Cripps Health Centre =

Coordinates: 52.943°N 1.197°W

Cripps Health Centre is the base for the University of Nottingham Health Service (UNHS). Its new building, opened in 2018, is the largest single site general practice health centre in the United Kingdom. About 45,000 patients are registered there and there are 50 staff.

The Cripps Foundation, founded by Sir Humphrey Cripps donated £9 million to finance the rebuilding of the centre. The previous, smaller, building opened in 1969 and had 6,000 students and staff registered.

== Overview ==
The centre was designed by CPMG Architects and Arup Group with not only clinical consulting rooms, minor operations suites and a patient observation bay, but physiotherapy areas, and a dental treatment surgery, pharmacy and space for the university mental health advisory service as well as the usual training rooms and offices. There are medicinal and aromatherapy plants in a courtyard garden.

The centre provided a free sexual health service until March 2018 when funding for it was withdrawn. Nottingham City Council said it was "additional and complementary to core provision."

== Recognition ==
The University of Nottingham Health Service is an NHS general practice and has been rated as Outstanding by the Care Quality Commission in 2015 and upon reinspection in 2019. It was also named the Best Inclusive Building in the region in 2019 at the East Midlands Building Excellence Awards.

== See also ==
- Alfred Barrow Health Centre
