= Colton Hills Community School =

Location
- Jeremy Road; Wolverhampton; West Midlands, WV4 5DG; England; 52°33′41″N 2°08′11″W

Information
- Type: Community school
- Motto: Many Minds, One Mission
- Established: 1974
- Local authority: Wolverhampton
- Specialist: Language
- Department for Education URN: 104395 Tables
- Ofsted: Reports
- Headteacher: Headteacher Ms Julie Hunter 2023 - present
- Gender: Mixed
- Age: 11 to 18
- Enrolment: 965 as of October 2017
- Former name: Wolverhampton Municipal Grammar School Graiseley Secondary School and Penn secondary modern.
- Website: www.coltonhills.co.uk

Colton Hills Community School is a mixed secondary school and sixth form situated in the Goldthorn Park area of Wolverhampton, West Midlands, England.

== Admissions ==
The school has over 1100 pupils on its roll, including sixth formers. It is situated halfway between Goldthorn Park and Penn. Park Hill is to the east, and the school is close to the LEA boundary with Dudley (Sedgley). Access is via the A4039, to the north, and is not far from the A449, to the west.

== History ==
=== Grammar school ===
Wolverhampton Municipal Grammar School was on Newhampton Road East, run by Wolverhampton Education Committee, and was co-educational, when Wolverhampton was in Staffordshire. The building is now the Newhampton Centre of City of Wolverhampton College. It was known as the Higher Grade School from 1894 to 1921, and Wolverhampton Municipal Secondary School from 1921 to 1945. From 1977, the building was used by Valley Park School until 1989.

The school was commonly known as the 'Muni', and its motto was Post Tenebras Lux, which means 'Out of Darkness Comes Light', which is also the motto of the City of Wolverhampton itself.

Colton Hills Community School currently houses 1,009 students.

=== Comprehensive ===
Graiseley Secondary School was a coeducational secondary modern school, formed in 1963. It is now Graiseley Primary School on Graiseley Hill. There had been a Graiseley Boys' Secondary School and a Graiseley Girls' Secondary School. Penn Secondary School was on Manor Road in Penn.

Colton Hills School was formed in September 1974 from a merger of Graiseley and Penn secondary modern schools in the Graiseley district of Wolverhampton and of Wolverhampton Municipal Grammar School in Whitmore Reans. It initially existed within the buildings of these two schools before relocating to the site at Goldthorn Park during 1975, on land which Wolverhampton had gained from Sedgley in the local government reorganisation of 1966.

It was initially known as Colton Hills Upper School, with the Newhampton Road site briefly used. The Lower School, comprising the first two years of secondary, was at the Manor Road site until 1992-3 when these years moved to the main site. The Manor Road site was later demolished and replaced by Penn Medical Centre and housing.

It has had specialist languages designation since 2006 and been a Creative Partnership school since 2008. Its student population is ethnically diverse, with the highest proportion having an Indian heritage.

== Facilities ==
The school's facilities include a swimming pool which is also open to public use. It also has a field, an AstroTurf, theatre, sports hall and dance studio.

== Notable former pupils ==
- Kevin Darley, jockey
- Delicious Orie, boxer, winner of gold medal at Commonwealth Games 2022

=== Wolverhampton Municipal Grammar School ===
- Frances Barber, actress
- Howard R. Davies, motorcycle racing champion
- Jon Raven, musician

== See also ==
- Wolverhampton Grammar School, co-educational independent school
