= University of Nottingham Halls of Residence =

Student housing at the University of Nottingham, England

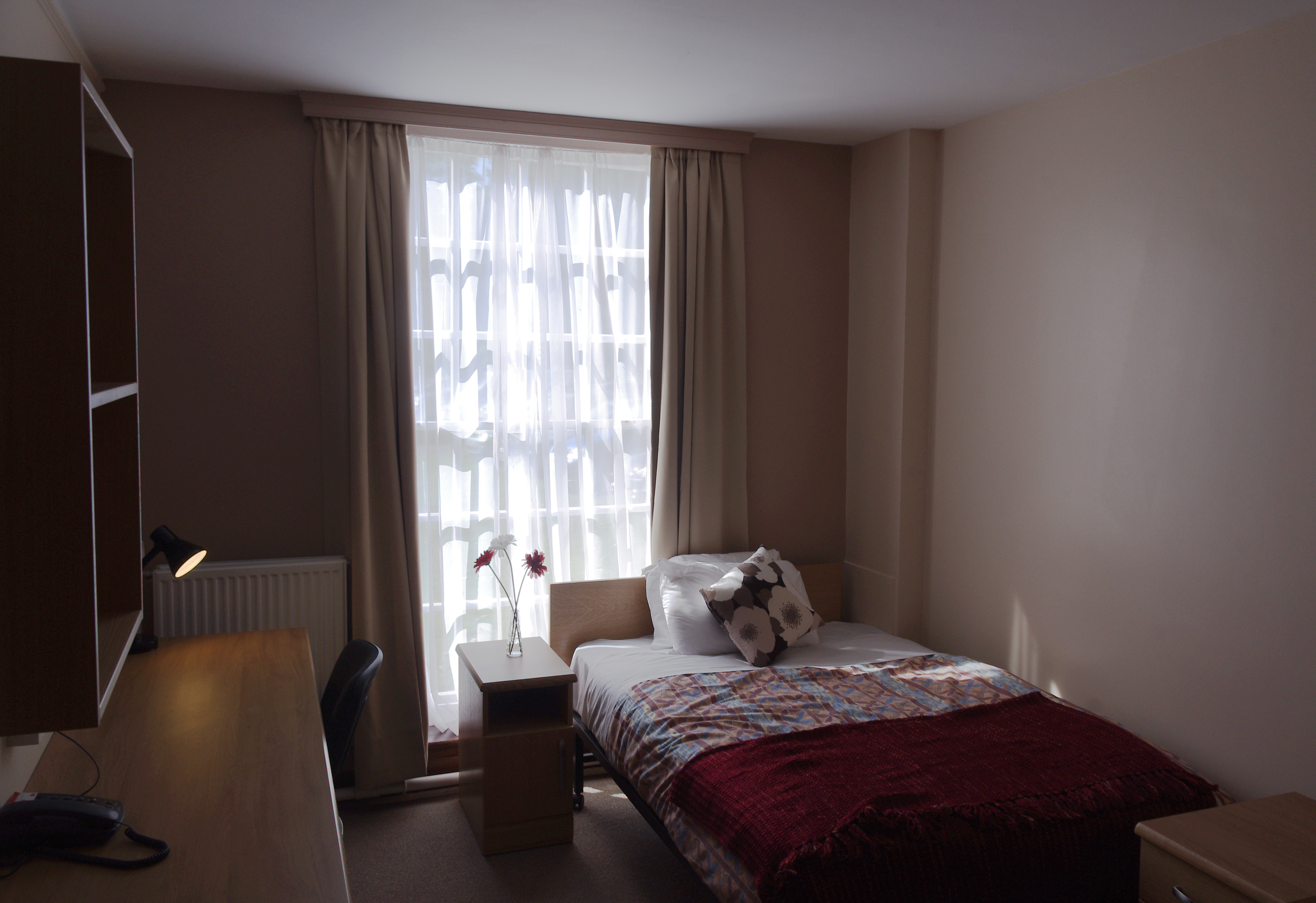
A Cripps Hall bedroom

This is a list of halls of residence on the various campuses of the University of Nottingham in Nottingham, England.

The University of Nottingham has a system of halls located on its campus. The halls acts a microcosms of the university at large and provide a community-level forum for the interaction of undergraduates, postgraduates and senior academics.

The halls are generally named either after counties, districts or places in the English East Midlands (Nottingham having been originally conceived as a regional university for this area) or significant people associated with the university. Beeston, Lenton, Lincoln, Derby, Rutland, Sherwood, Newark, Southwell, Ancaster and Melton halls fall into the former category; Hugh Stewart, Cripps, Cavendish, Nightingale, Florence Boot, Wortley and Willoughby into the latter.

== University Park Campus ==
All halls of residence on University Park Campus are of mixed-sex undergraduate type.

=== Ancaster ===
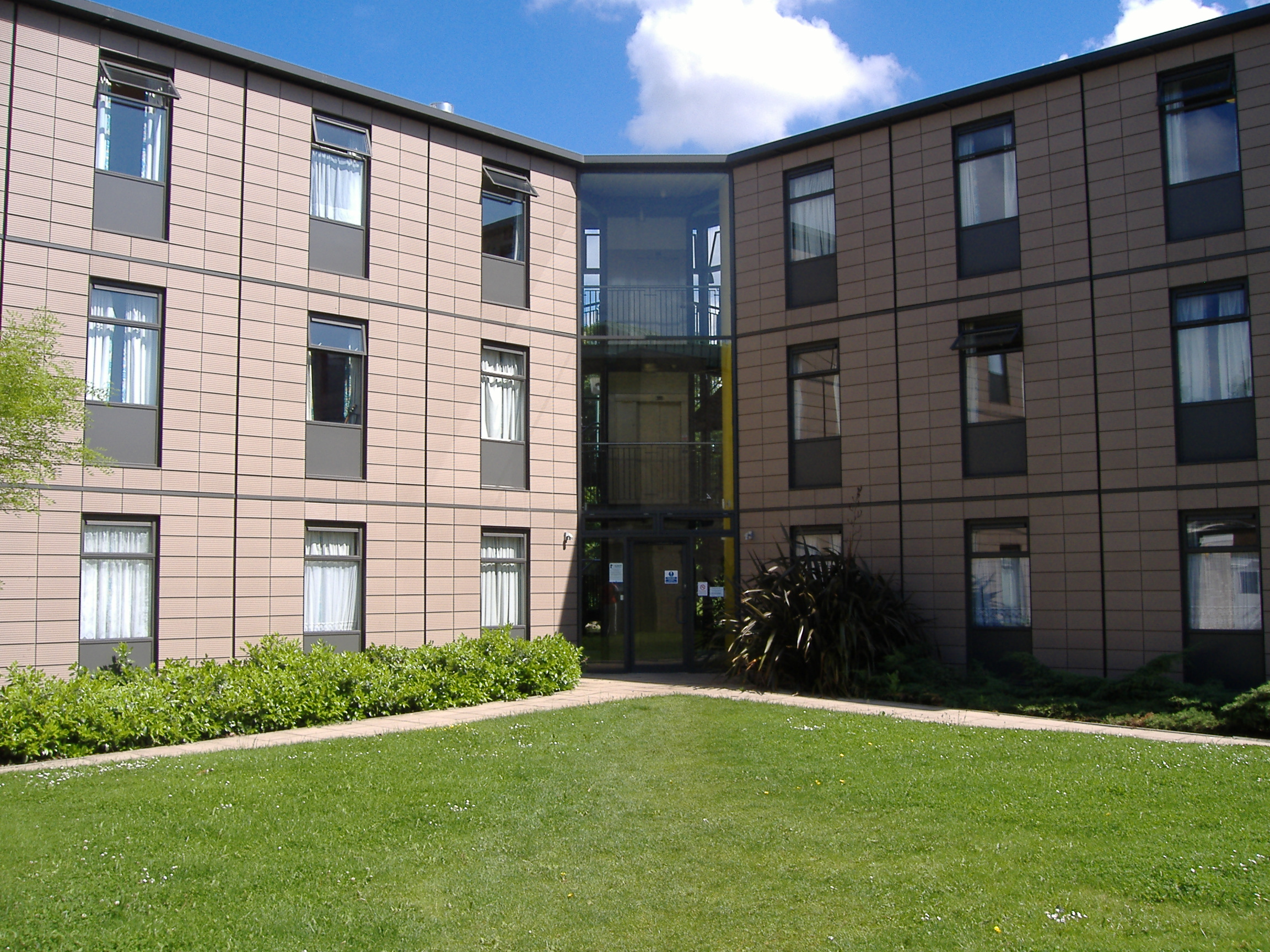
One of the detached blocks of Ancaster Hall.

Ancaster Hall (52.9359°N 1.2077°W) provides accommodation for about 270 students. The current warden is Professor Svenja Adolphs. It has a particularly high proportion of ensuite rooms. Ancaster Hall was the first "mixed sex" hall of residence at Nottingham University - and had a vibrant reputation very much managed by its first Warden - Dr Virginia van der Lande.

Notable alumni

- London Grammar – British trip hop trio. The band are said to have practised using the piano that was located in the bar/study area, now located in the dining area.

=== Cavendish ===
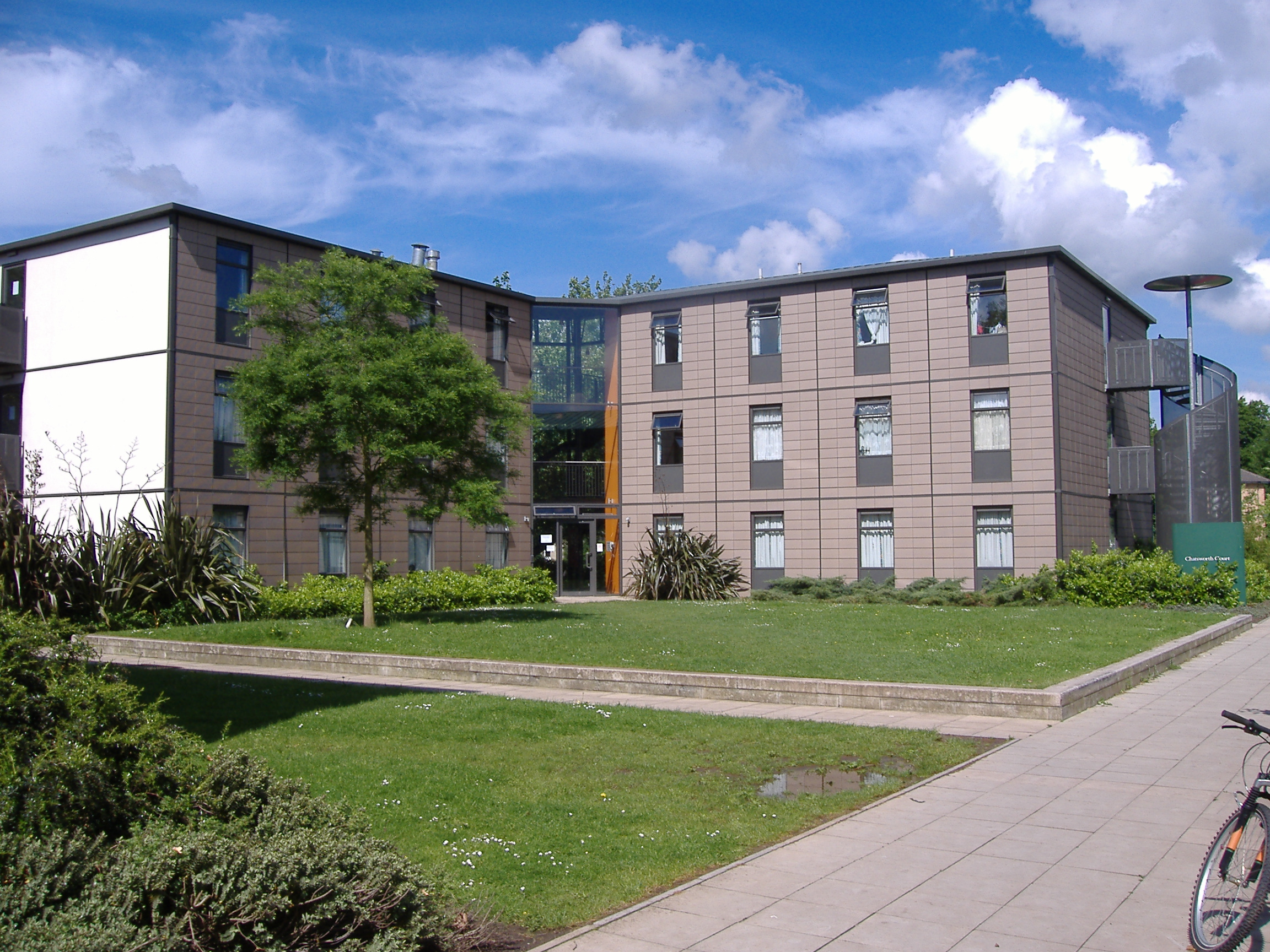
One of the detached blocks of Cavendish Hall.

Cavendish Hall (52.9361°N 1.2055°W) provides accommodation for 278 students. The hall is named after the Cavendish family or, more specifically, the Duke of Devonshire. The hall surrounds a lawn quadrangle, with its own rose garden and is reached via a bridge over a grass moat. A short walk brings guests to the university boating lake.

=== Cripps ===
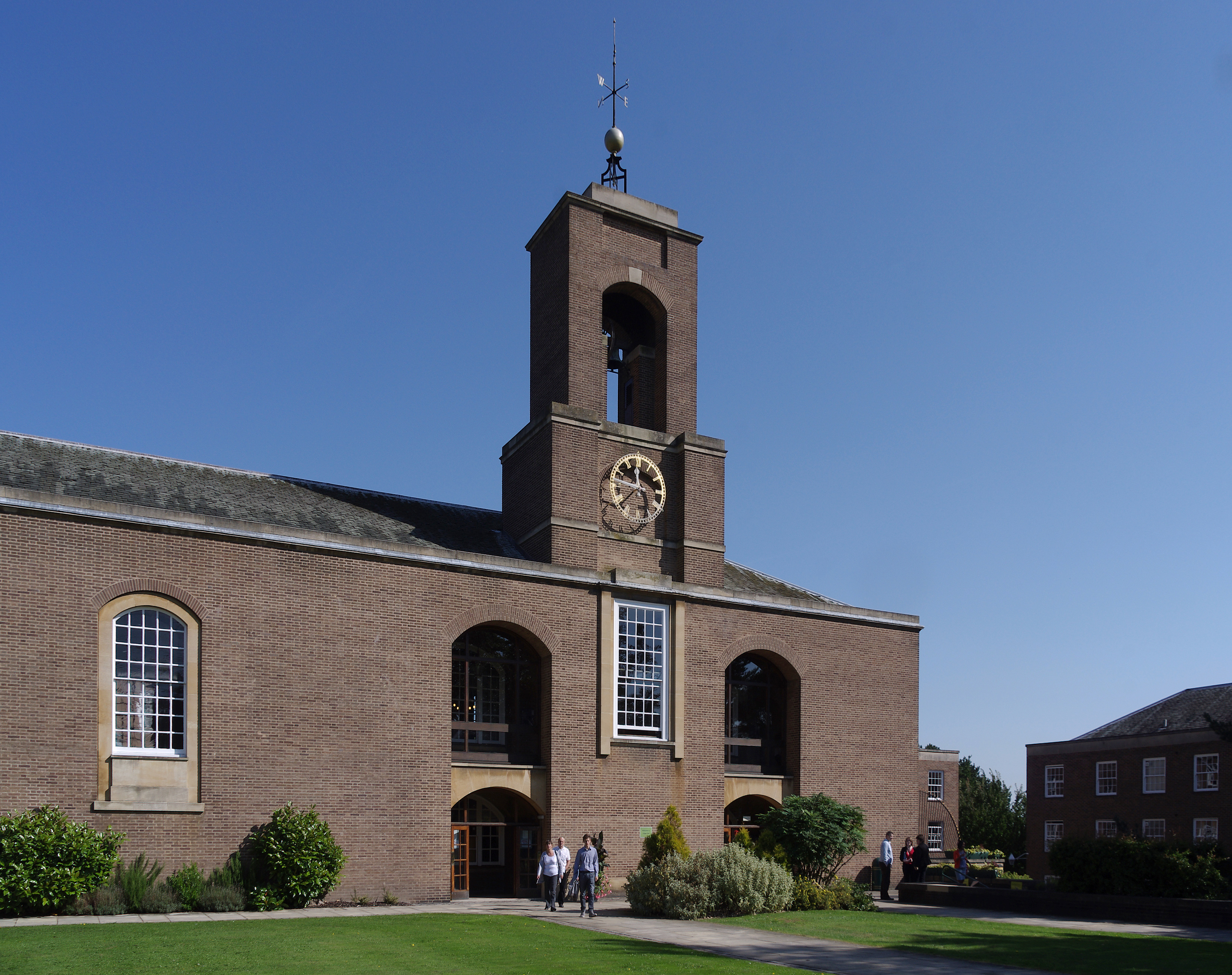
Cripps Hall clock tower

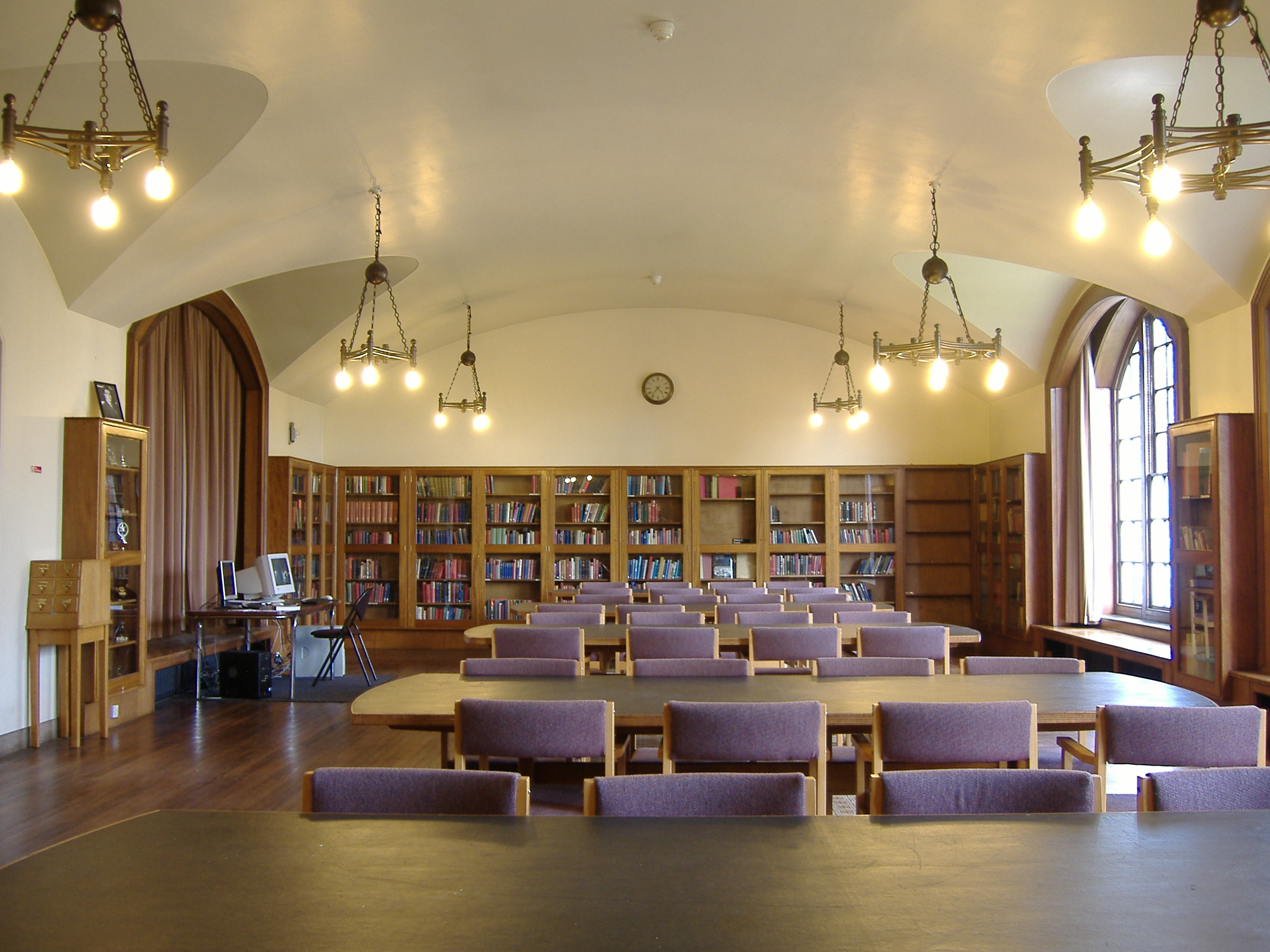
Cripps Hall Library

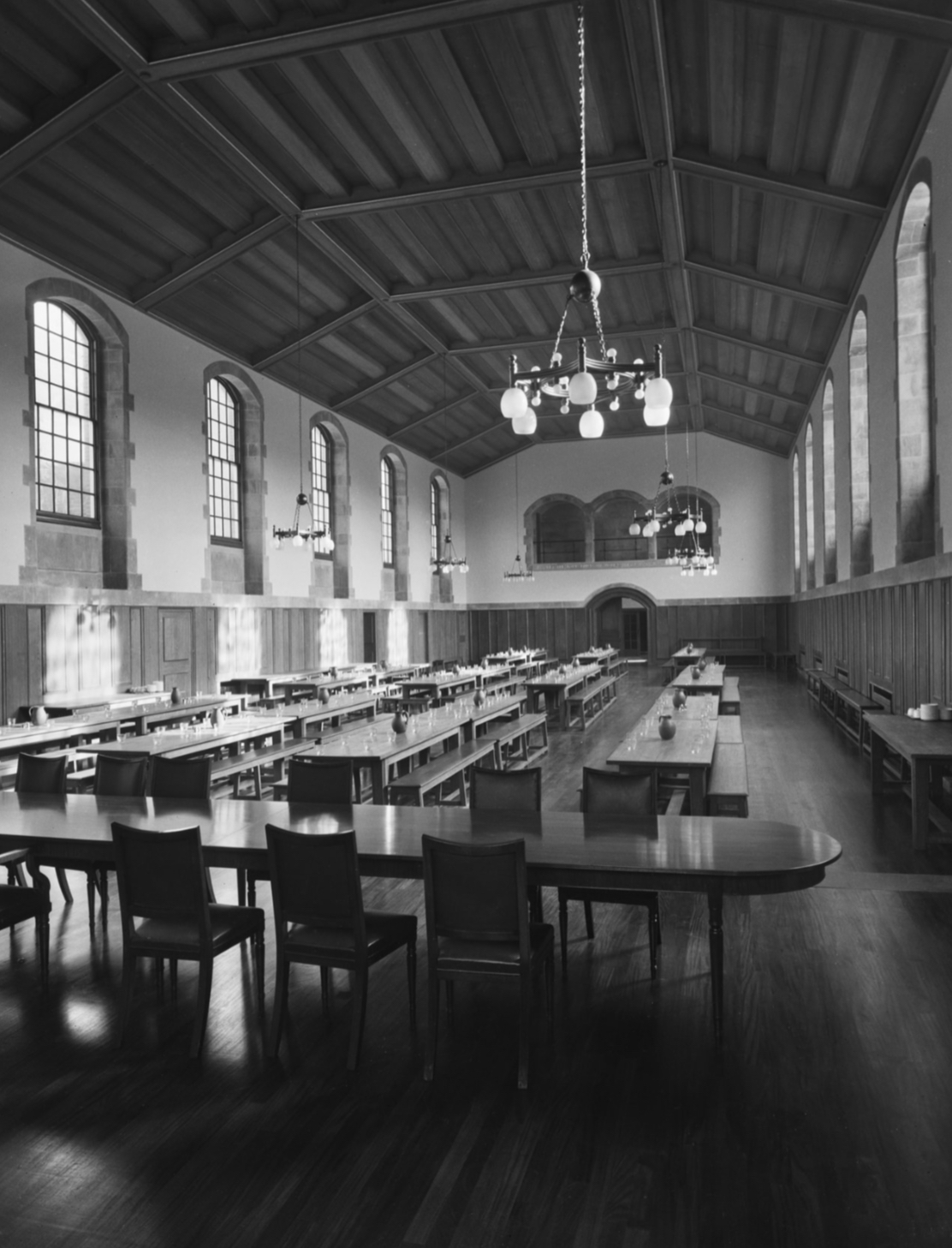
Cripps Dining Hall

Cripps Hall (52.9419°N 1.1955°W) provides accommodation for over 300 students. The hall is named after its benefactor, Sir Cyril Cripps. It opened in 1959 and was originally all male, but has been mixed sex since 2000. Cripps Hall was designed by the architects Donald McMorran and George Whitby, and is Grade II listed (one of only relatively few post-war buildings to be given such status).

Built around traditional quads, the Dining Hall is notable in being wood-panelled with several paintings of former Wardens above it a Library and functional bell tower. There is also a junior common room and a bar room with pool table, though it does not serve drinks; the nearest licensed Campus Bar being at neighbouring Hugh Stewart Hall.

Owing to a substantial donation from the Cripps Foundation to build a brand new Health Centre opposite the hall, the old Cripps Health Centre was converted into an extra accommodation block for Cripps Hall for the start of the 2018–19 academic year; it is named 'Lower Cripps' and added a further 55 rooms to the hall. This brings the total number of rooms to 368, making it the largest catered hall on the University Park campus.

Alumni and current students resident in Cripps Hall can join the Cripps Hall Association which is the membership arm of the Cripps Hall Trust. The Association reflects the original Hall Founder’s principles of community and fellowship, allowing former students to remain connected and offer something back to the Hall. The Cripps Hall Trust (Registered Charity No: 528348) exists to support existing and past members of Cripps Hall through the provision of travel scholarships to encourage personal development and benefits to the wider community, discretionary grants for additional Hall facilities, support for cases of individual hardship, and on-going membership / communication services. These include the Harry Lucas Travel Scholarships assisting students travelling to expand their education.

=== Derby ===
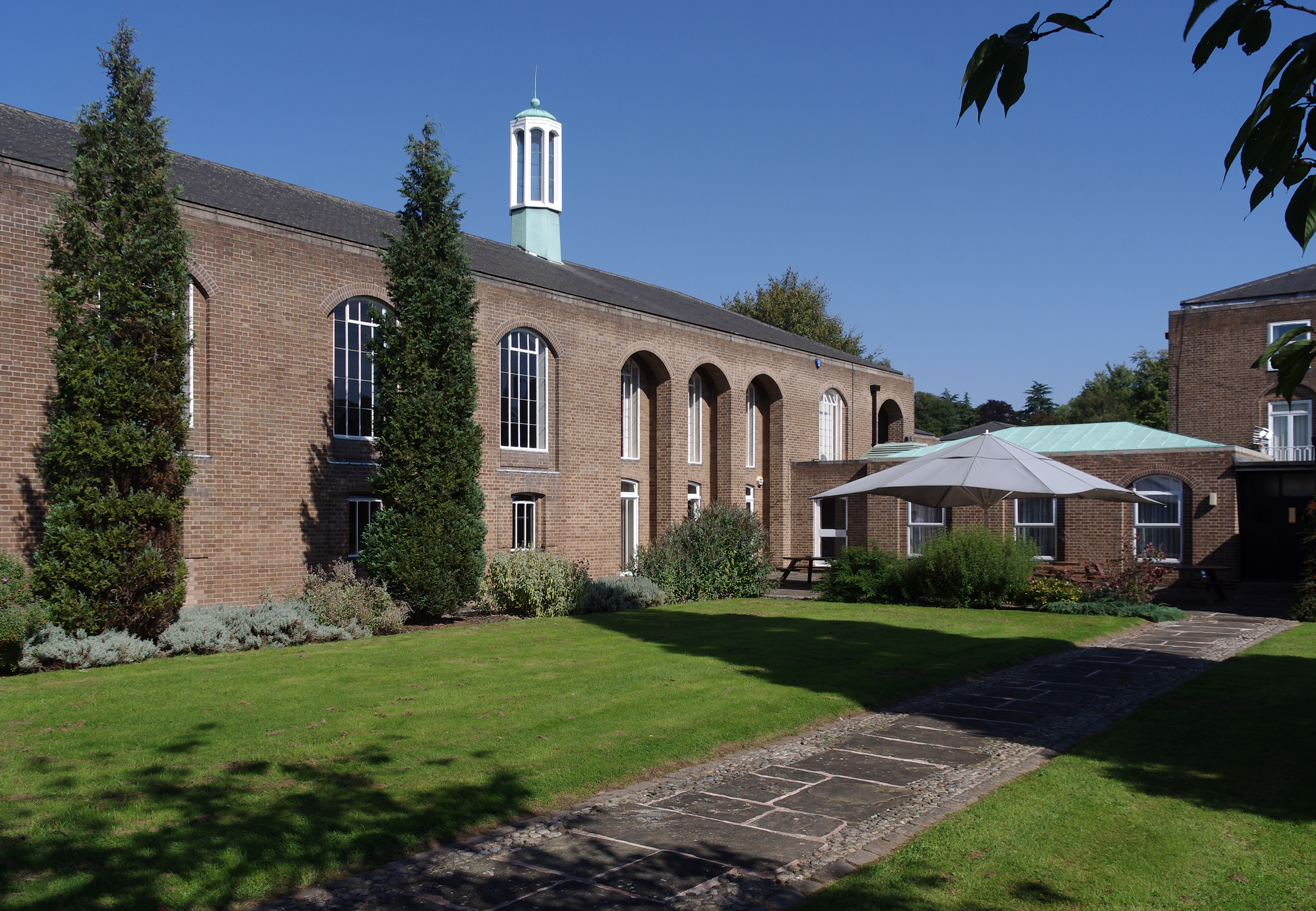
Derby Hall

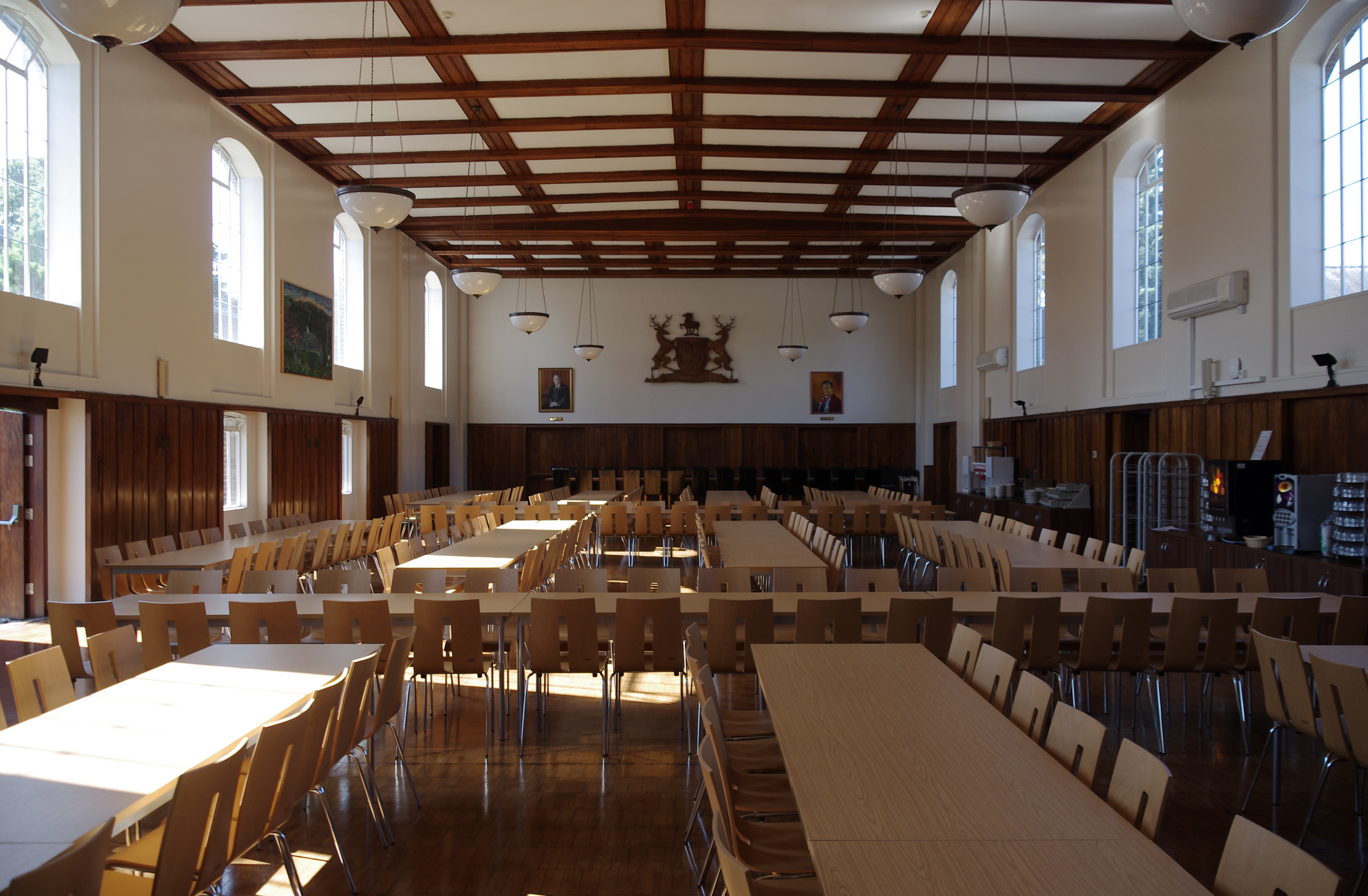
Derby Hall Dining hall

Derby Hall (52.9416°N 1.2021°W) provides accommodation for over 300 students. The hall is named after the local city of Derby. The hall, completed in 1963, was designed by the New Zealand architect, Brian O'Rorke, in classical style around a central quad. An extension block named Matlock was later added, greatly increasing accommodation by adding 96 rooms.

=== Florence Boot ===
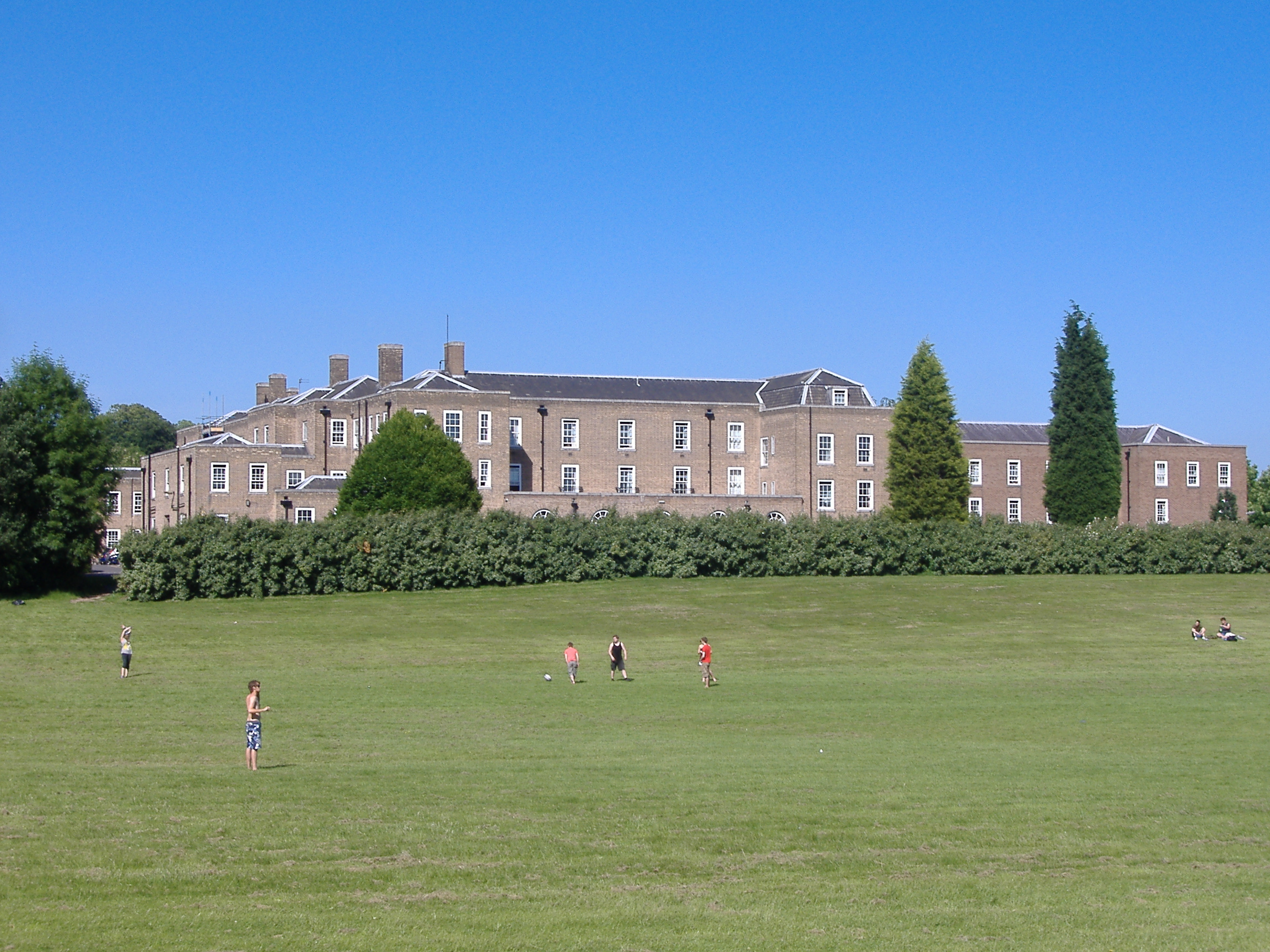
Florence Boot Hall

Florence Boot Hall (52.9343°N 1.2019°W) provides accommodation for just under 200 students. The hall is named after Florence Boot, the wife of Jesse Boot, the first Lord Trent, a major benefactor to the university. The hall was designed by Percy Richard Morley Horder. It was opened in 1928, making it the oldest hall on the campus (Hugh Stewart Hall has existed for longer as Lenton Hall, but Florence Boot has been designated as a hall for longer). The first warden was Inez de Castro, from 1928 to 1942. The hall was originally all female, but has been mixed sex since 2000.

Louise Mary Long (1892-1981) of Whatton, Nottinghamshire, a former Voluntary Aid Detachment nurse, was appointed Matron of Florence Boot Hall on its opening in 1928. Long was involved with the Warden Inez de Castro in running the hall, and had responsibility for the physical well-being of the students.

In the late 1930s, Laura Coles (1895-1948), who had completed her training at King Edward VII Hospital, Windsor in 1920 and become a registered nurse on the opening of the nursing register in 1921, was appointed by the College, to provide nursing care for all sickness and accidents at the College, residing at Florence Boot Hall.

=== Hugh Stewart ===
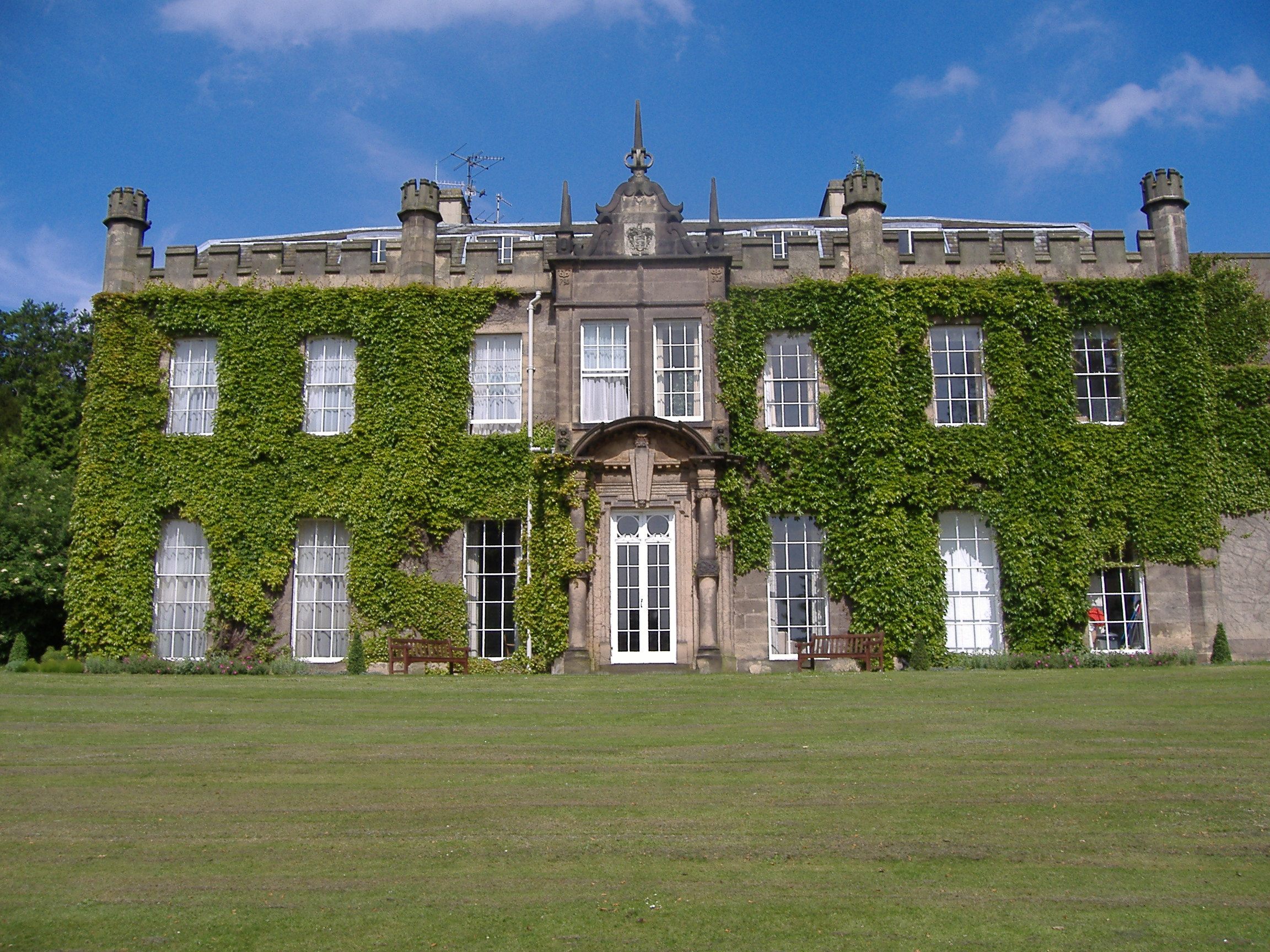
Warden's residence, previously Lenton Hall, at Hugh Stewart Hall

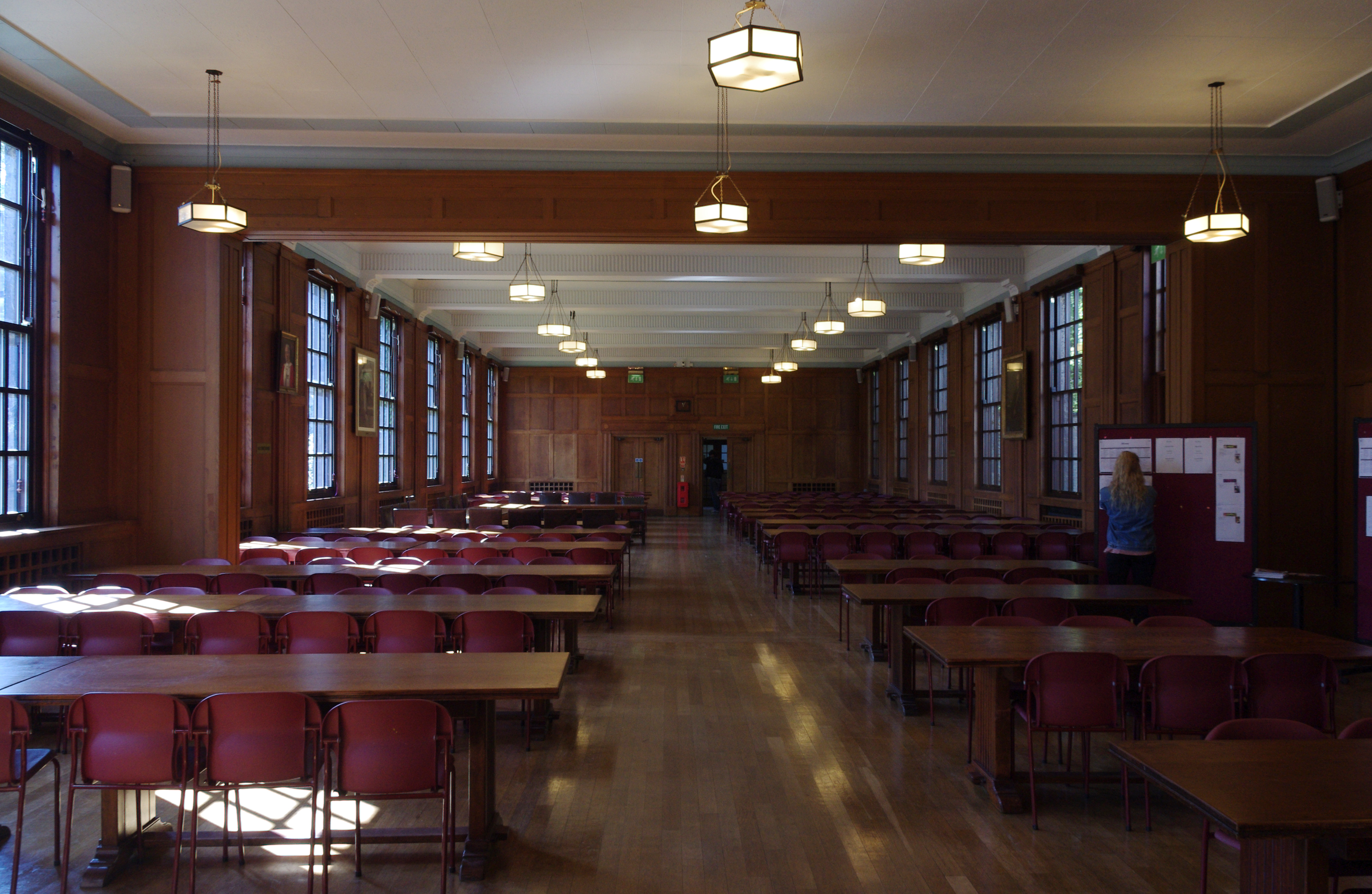
Hugh Stewart dining hall

Hugh Stewart Hall (52.9405°N 1.1957°W) is the largest hall on University Park Campus (the third largest at the university), providing accommodation for around 340 students. The hall is named after Hugh Stewart (1884–1934), who was Principal of University College Nottingham from 1929 until his death. Until 2000, the hall was all male. The oldest part of Hugh Stewart Hall was originally called Lenton Hall and was built in about 1792, by the architect William Stretton, as a home for Nottingham banker and owner of the Butterley Company, John Wright. This oldest part is known as Warden's House and is Grade II listed. The hall was extended in 1937, at which time it was renamed Hugh Stewart. It was extended again in 1969.

The Hall's Warden is Professor Glenn McDowell. He is also Warden of Lenton & Wortley and Cripps Halls, and Head of the Department of Civil Engineering. The Deputy Warden is Ms Stacy Johnson of the School of Nursing, who was Warden from September 2005 – 2010 and took over from archaeologist Dr Jon Henderson; he unexpectedly had to resign due to academic commitments, having been warden for only a year. He was preceded by Dr. Don Rees, who had been Warden of the hall for 29 years, and after whom the hall library is named. The hall features 'Latitude', one of four licensed hall bars on campus.

=== Lenton & Wortley ===
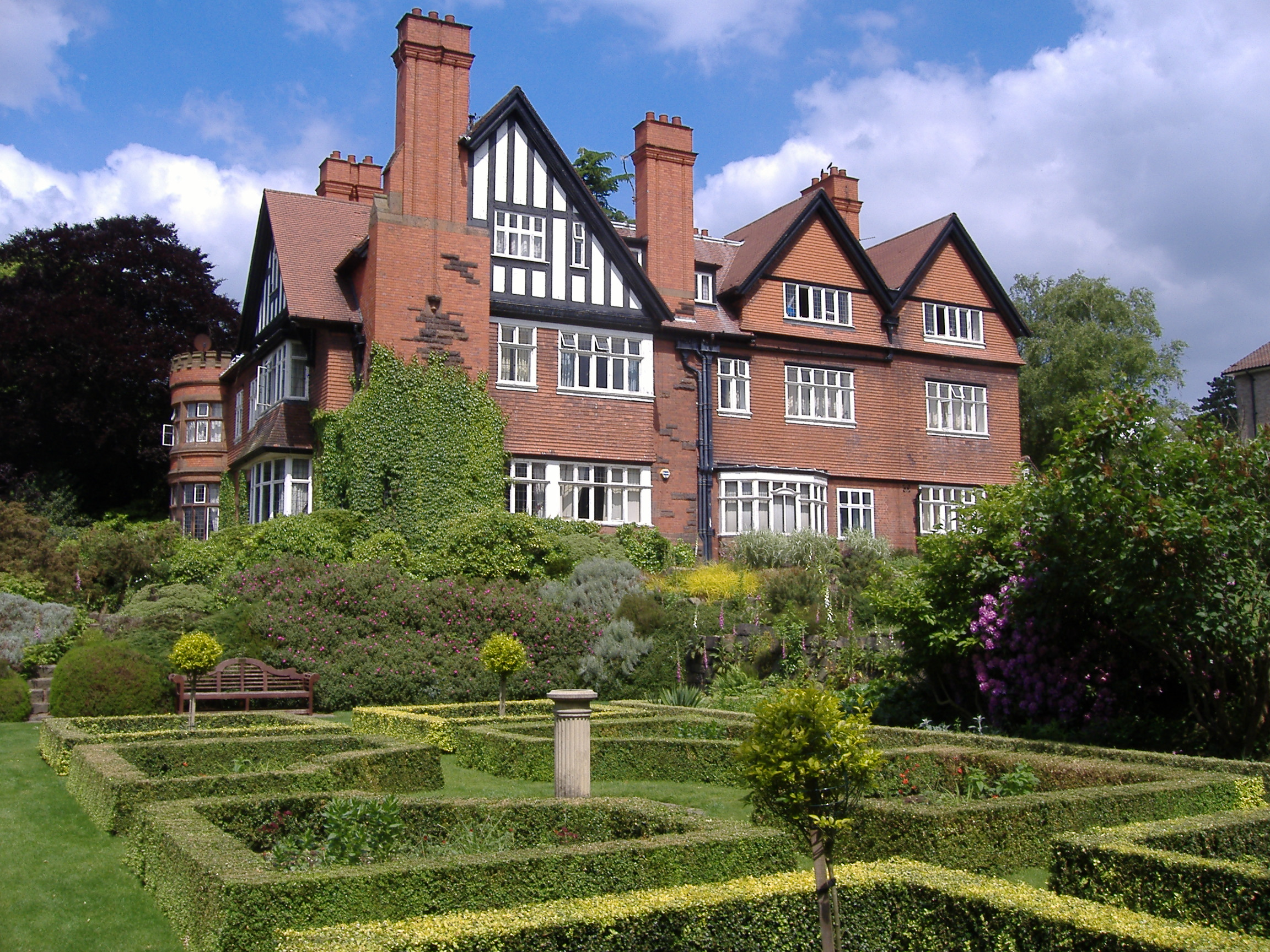
Lenton Hurst, Lenton & Wortley Halls

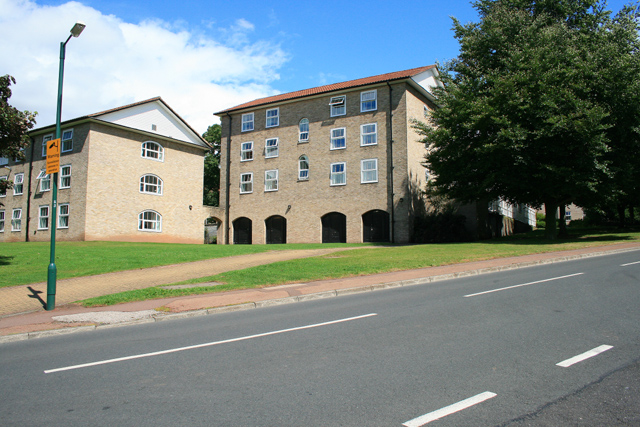
Lenton and Wortley Hall.

Lenton and Wortley Hall (52.9432°N 1.1986°W) is a mixed undergraduate hall of residence. Like Cripps Hall, it was designed by Donald McMorran and George Whitby. It provides accommodation for around 283 students, making it the third largest hall on campus. Lenton and Wortley Hall is located in the 'North Zone', along with Cripps Hall, and lies between Derby Road and Beeston Lane. The Hall consists of blocks 1-12 and one en-suite block, Wortley House.

The hall results from the amalgamation of two previous halls of residence, New Lenton Hall and Wortley Hall, named after the local district of Lenton and Professor Harry Almond Saville Wortley, Principal of University College Nottingham from 1935 to 1947, as well as Lenton Hurst. Lenton Hurst, a large old house by the architect Arthur George Marshall next to the Lenton Hall (then so called), was until the 1970s used for student accommodation. Between 1980 and 2006, the Warden was Mr William Hooker. Professor Glenn McDowell, who was previously warden of Nightingale Hall, was Warden until 2019.

The hall is represented by its crest, which notably features the hall's symbolic animal, a squirrel, and a fir tree designed to represent the nearby fir trees; the large fir tree provides a focal point to the hall's main quad. The crest is believed to be designed around the conception of the halls and has the Latin motto "Desiderium nostrum servire", which translates to "Our desire to serve".

=== Lincoln ===
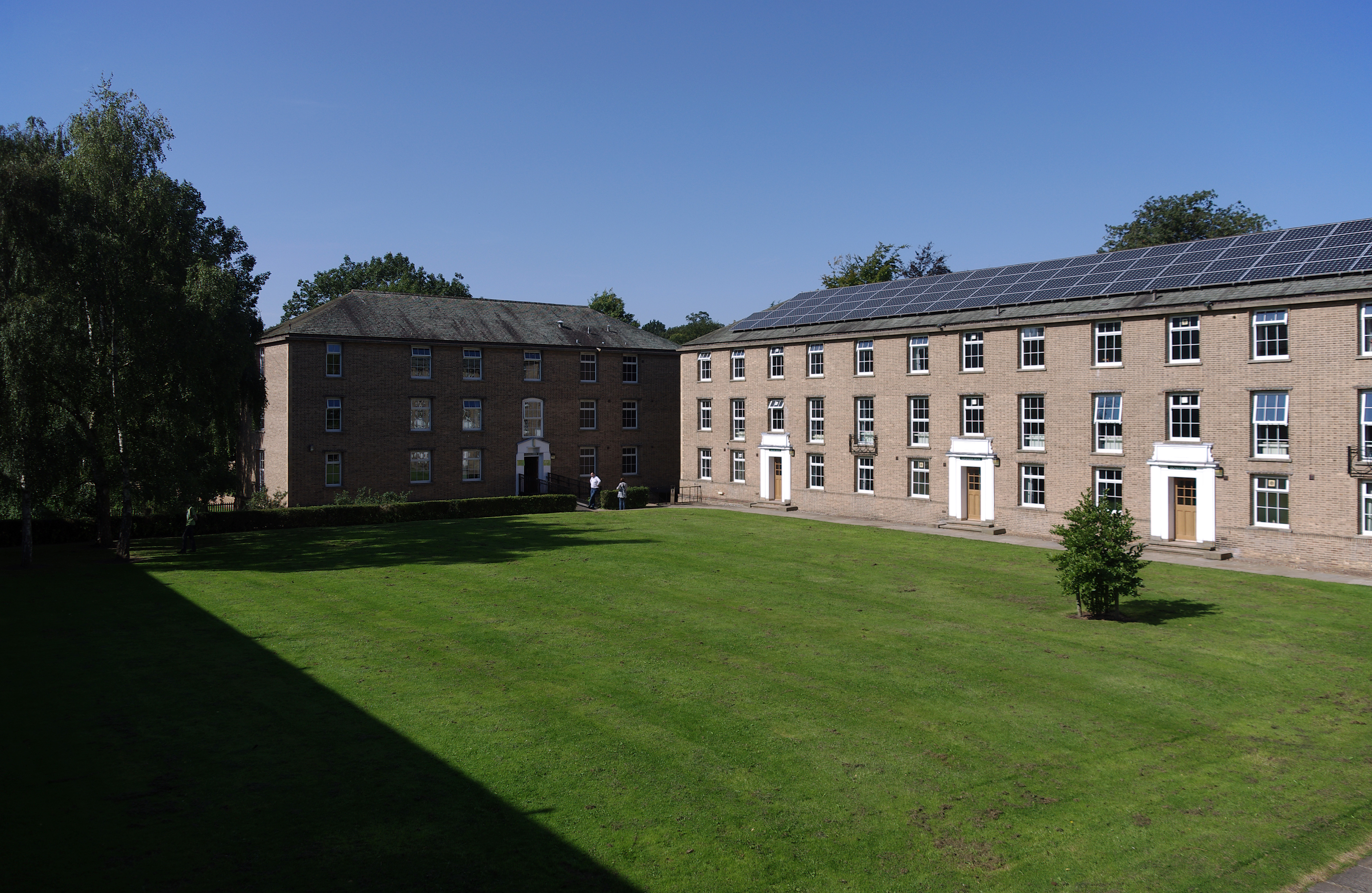
Lincoln Hall main quadrangle

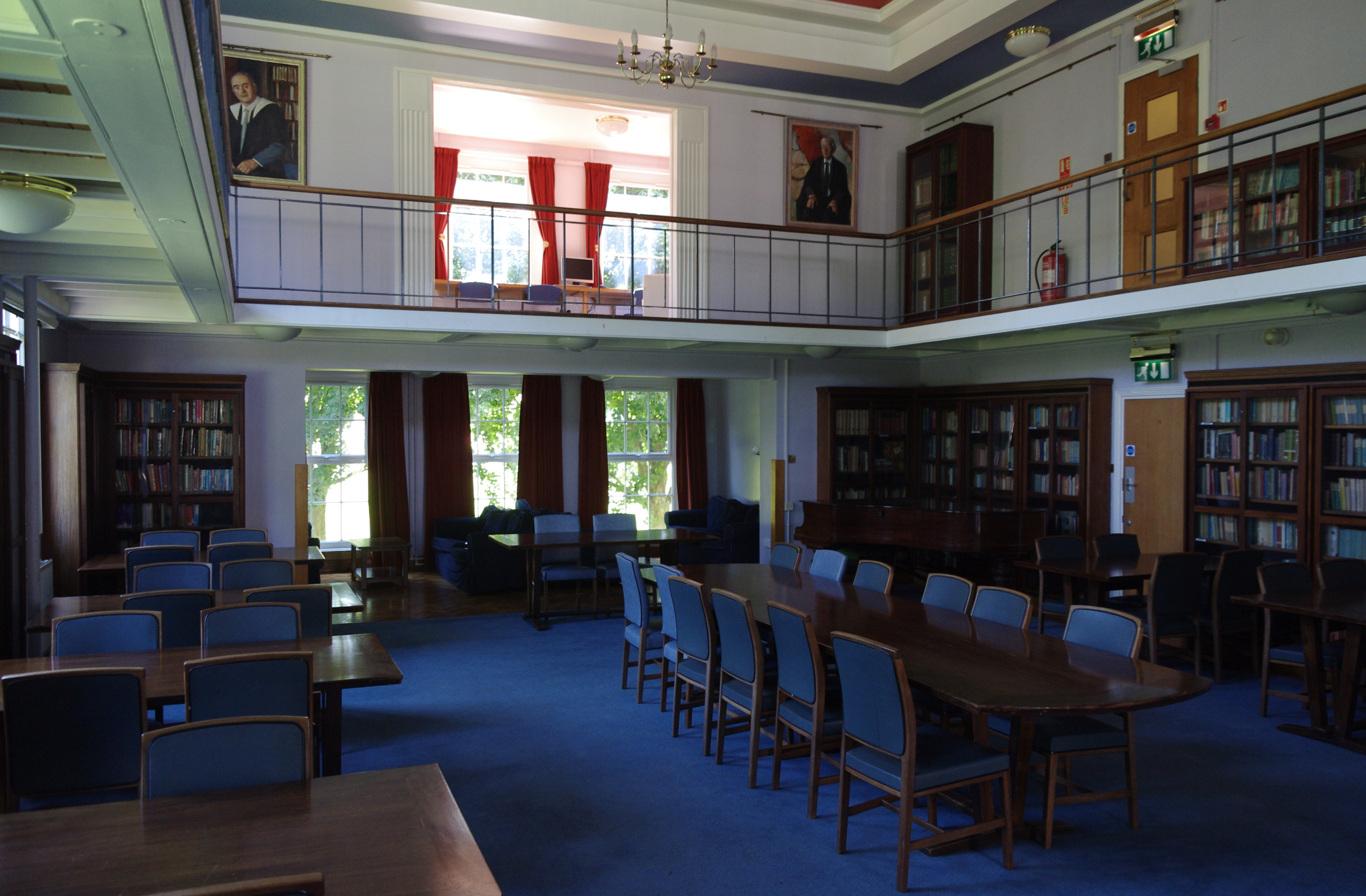
Coveney library at Lincoln Hall

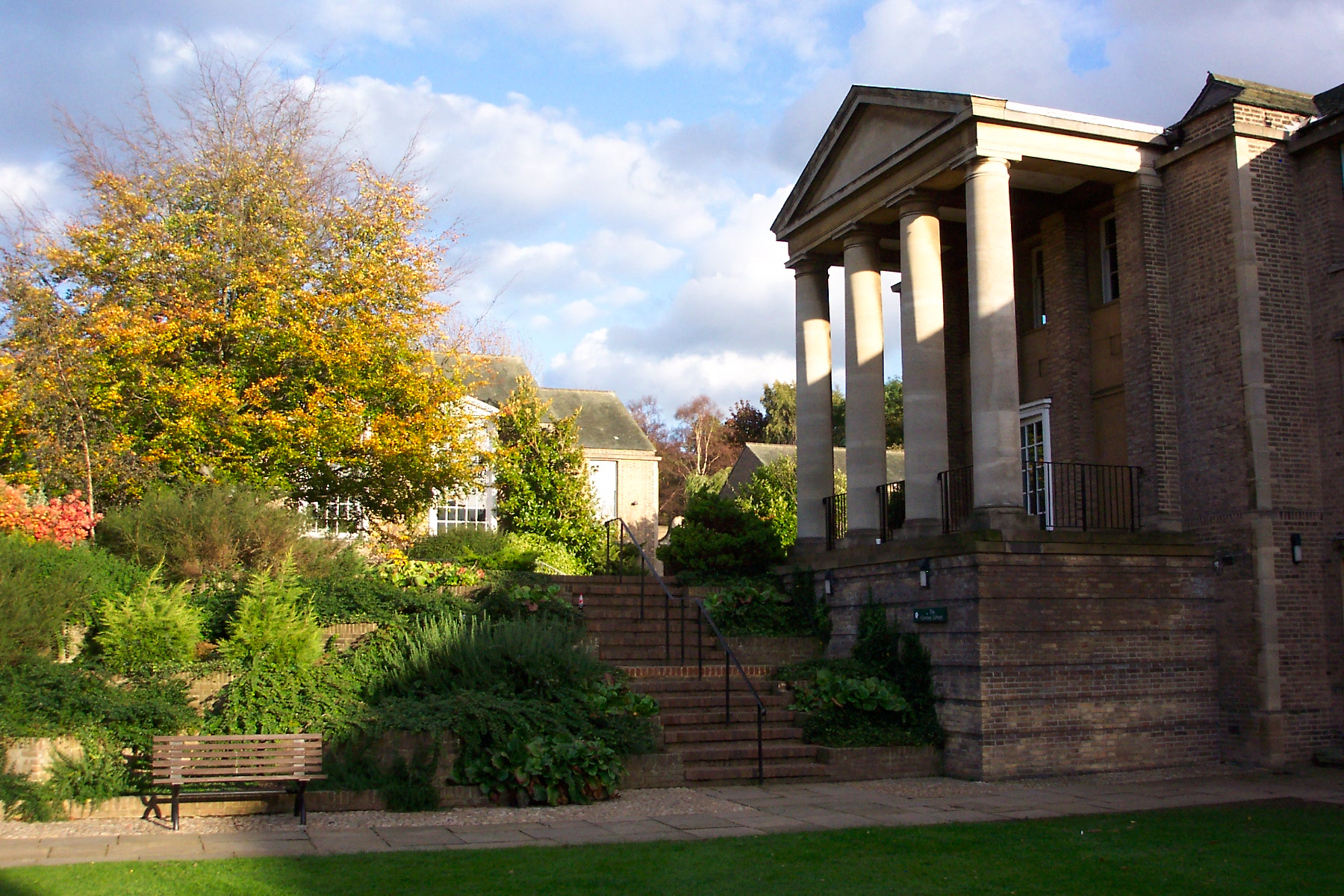
Covenham library

Lincoln Hall (52.9419°N 1.1995°W) is a mixed undergraduate hall of residence. It provides accommodation for about 221 students. The hall is named after the nearby East Midlands city of Lincoln. The current Hall Warden is Prof Vicky Chapman.

The Hall was designed by the Nottingham architect F.E. Wooley and opened in 1962; until 1997, it was an all-male hall. The buildings overlook parkland at the rear and form two main courts. The rectangular lower court consists of 12 self-contained accommodation blocks, each named after places found in the county of Lincolnshire. The upper court features the dining hall, the Coveney Library, the Senior Common Room and the gatehouse, all enclosing a circular lawn. Two gilded herons, the Hall's emblem, adorn the wrought iron gates leading to the park.

Notable alumni

- Sir John Henry Hayes – MP for South Holland and the Deepings in Lincolnshire since 1997 and former Minister of State for Transport; President of Lincoln JCR
- Levison Wood – explorer and writer

=== Nightingale ===
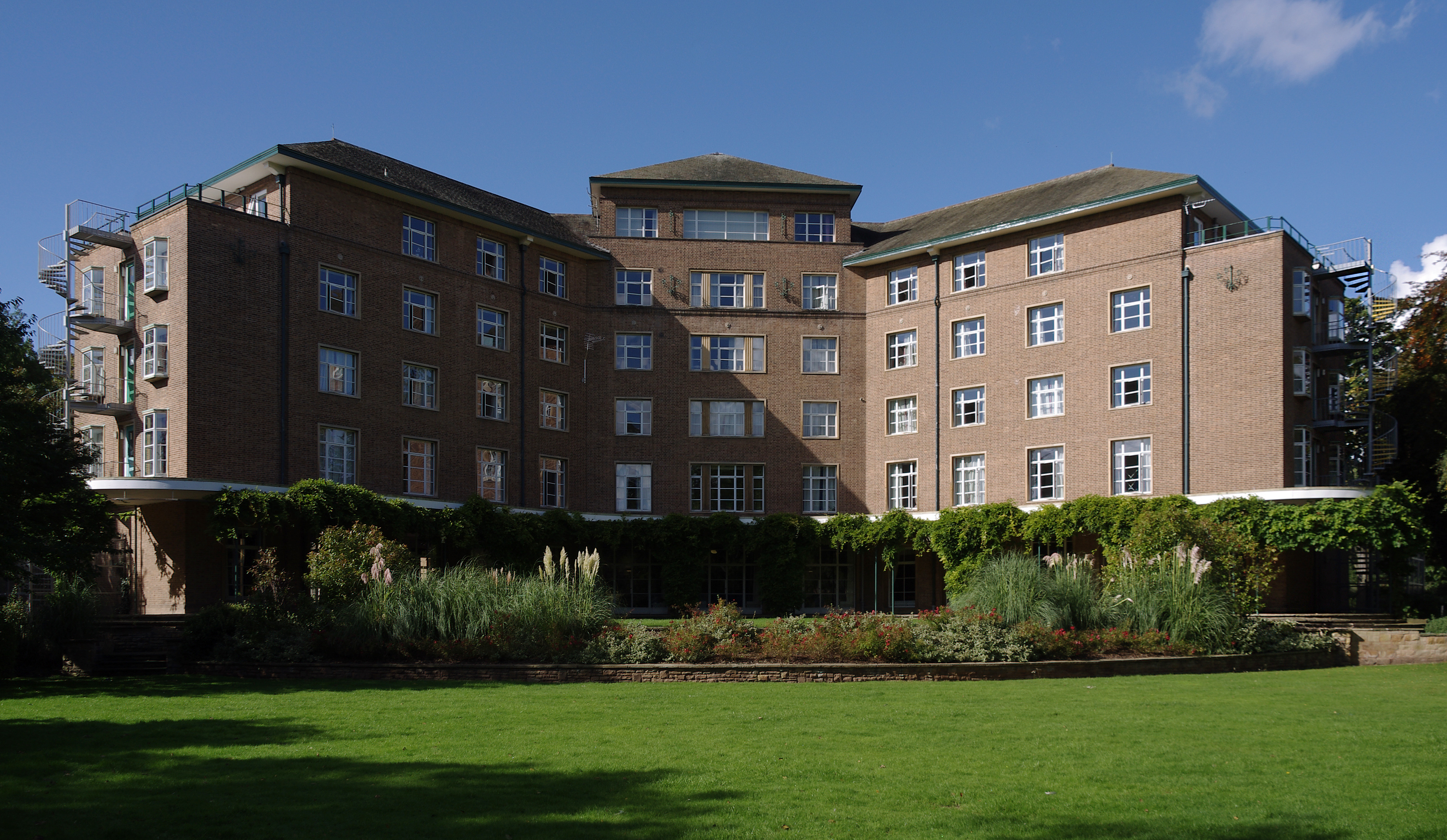
Nightingale Hall

Nightingale Hall (52.9374°N 1.2067°W) is the smallest hall of residence on campus with accommodation for 150 students. The hall opened in 1950. The first warden was the historian and poet Audrey Beecham. The hall was refurbished in 1998 and again in 2007.

It is named after the nursing pioneer Florence Nightingale, and originally stored the university's collection of documents and memorabilia associated with her, although this is now stored in the Hallward Library and the Florence Nightingale Museum in Southwark, London. Until 2000, the hall was all female, but it is now mixed. The Hall was one of the first to offer students 'large study bedroom' accommodation in September 2007, in which the rooms are fitted with three-quarter sized beds and a mini fridge; this is now common across all of University Park. The present warden is Professor Jan Bradley.

=== Rutland ===
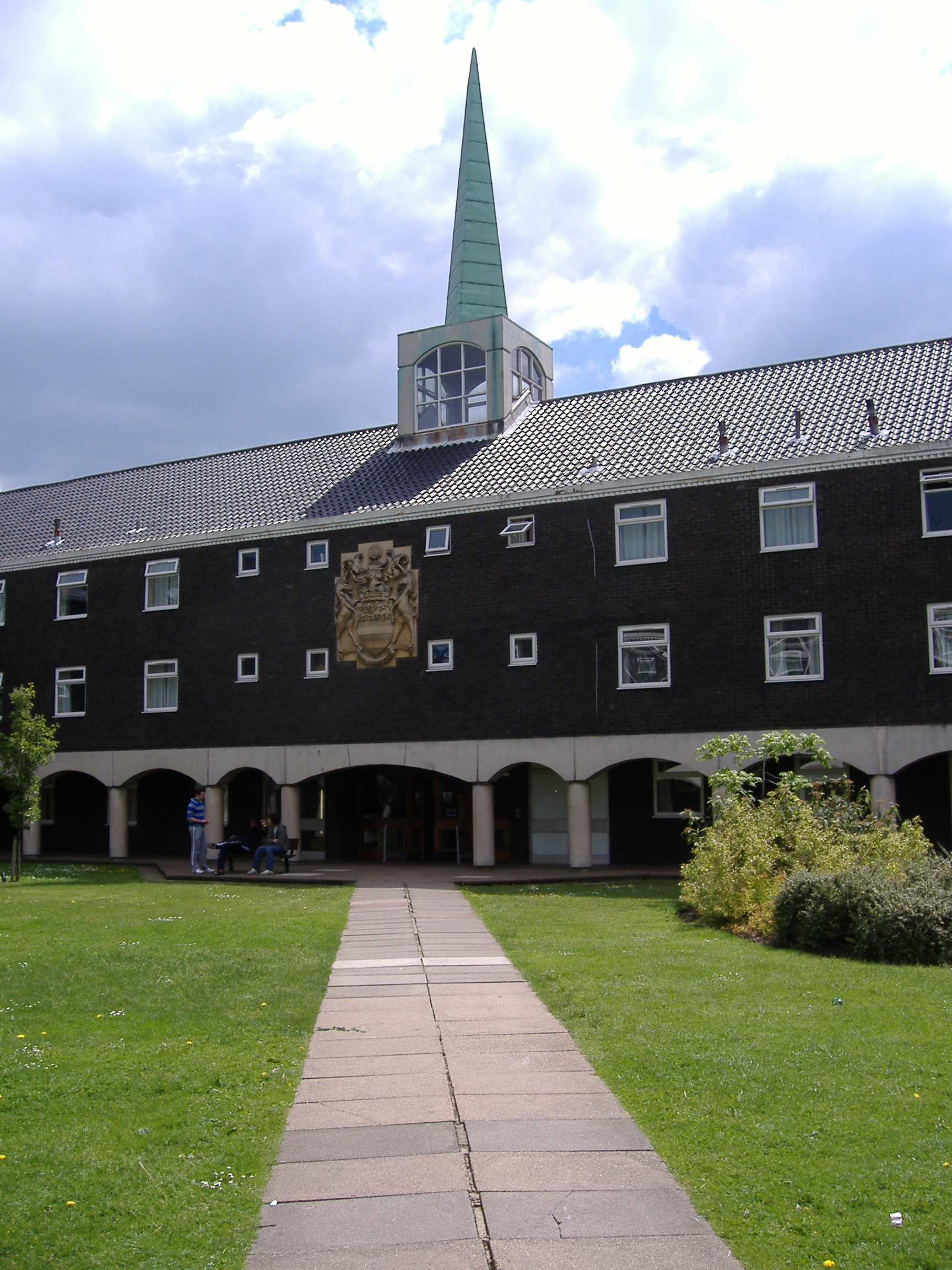
Rutland Hall spire

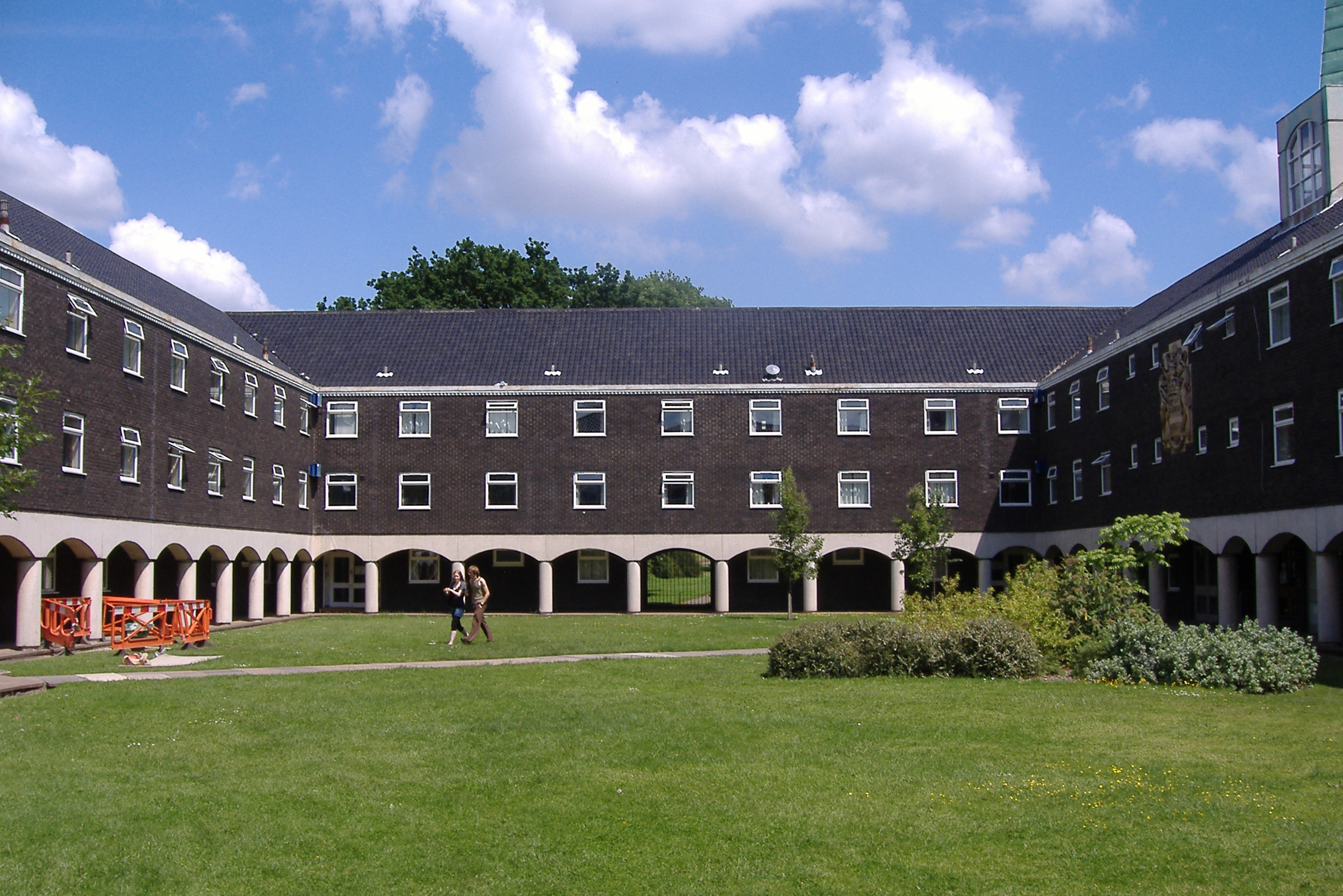
Rutland Hall quadrangle

Rutland Hall (52.9401°N 1.2033°W) provides accommodation for 284 students. It is named after both the East Midlands county of Rutland and the Duke of Rutland himself. The hall was originally opened in 1964, as part of a large expansion of the university during that period. It was originally a men's hall, but it and Ancaster became the university's first mixed halls in 1970. By the 1990s, it was clear that more accommodation was needed. Therefore, in 1993, a new, en suite wing was built—K Block. The building was completely refurbished in the summer of 1999. A particularly notable feature of the building is the unusual shape of its library, which is an octagon.

=== Sherwood ===
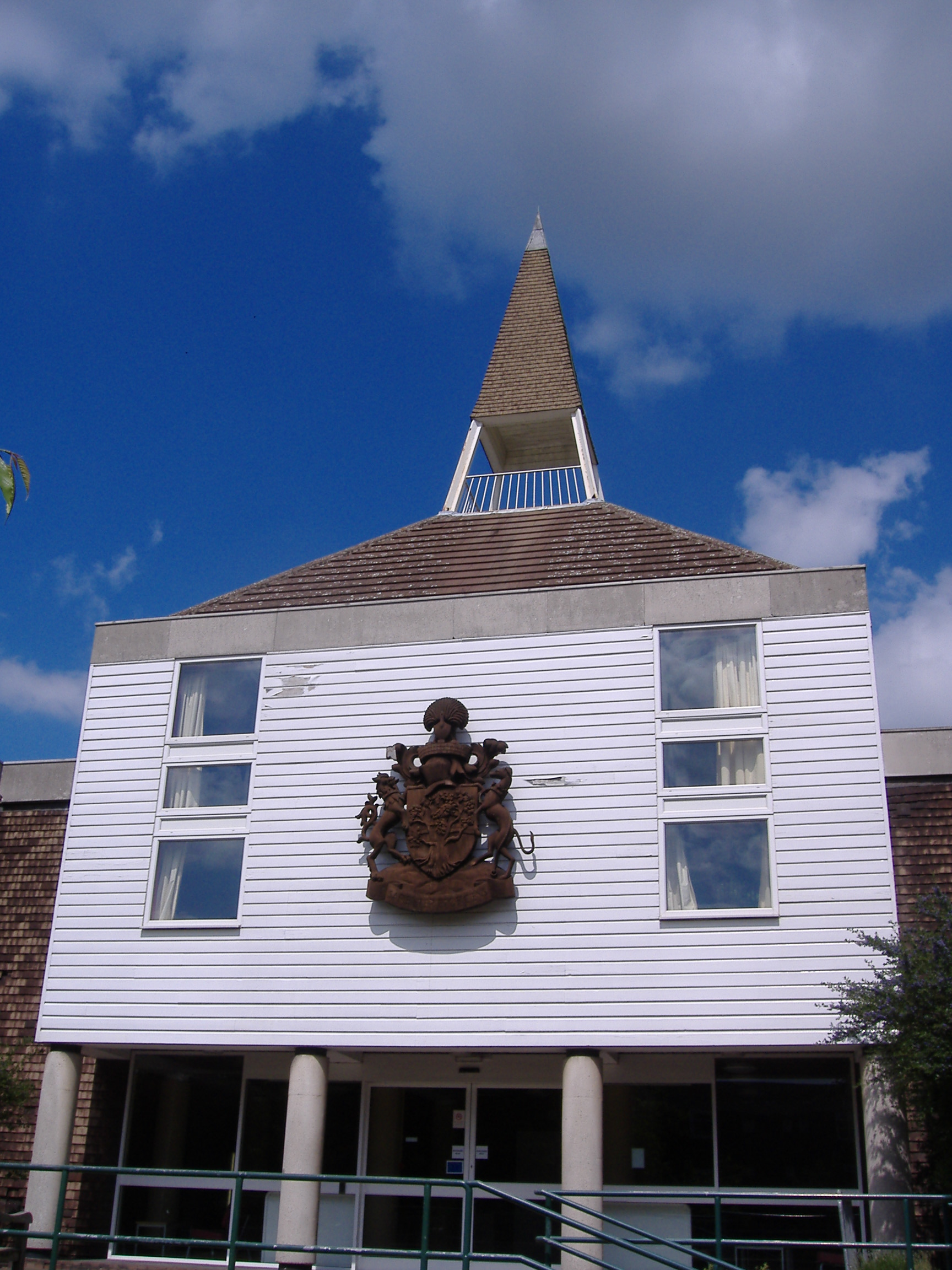
Sherwood Hall

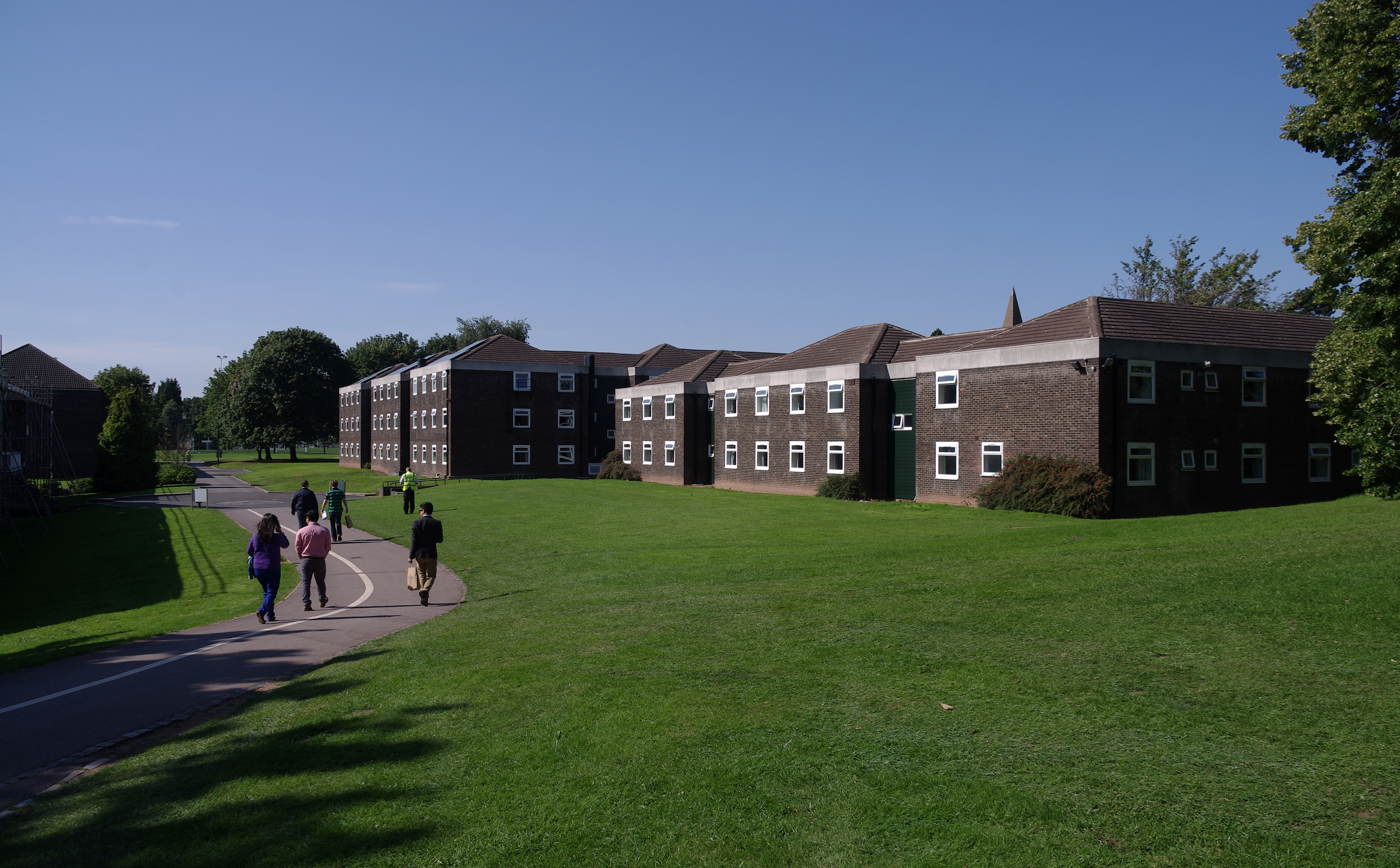
Sherwood Hall housing

Sherwood Hall (52.9407°N 1.2049°W) is a mixed undergraduate hall of residence. It provides accommodation for about 267 students. The hall was designed by the architects J Fletcher Watson as part of the 1960s expansion programme on University Park. Building work started in March 1963 and the hall opened, as a male hall of residence, in October 1964.

Sherwood Hall was designed as an interpretation of the traditional collegiate quadrangle, but using contemporary forms and materials. A distinctive feature is the white painted shiplap weatherboarding, which gives the hall something of a North American feel. As originally built, the hall had a single quadrangle of accommodation blocks, with a further accommodation block and the main hall and library forming a second, but open-ended, court. Subsequent extensions have transformed this into a second quadrangle. For the first twenty-two years of its life, the warden was the late W. R. "Bunny" Chalmers; he was succeeded in 2006 by Prof. Antonino La Rocca.

=== Willoughby ===
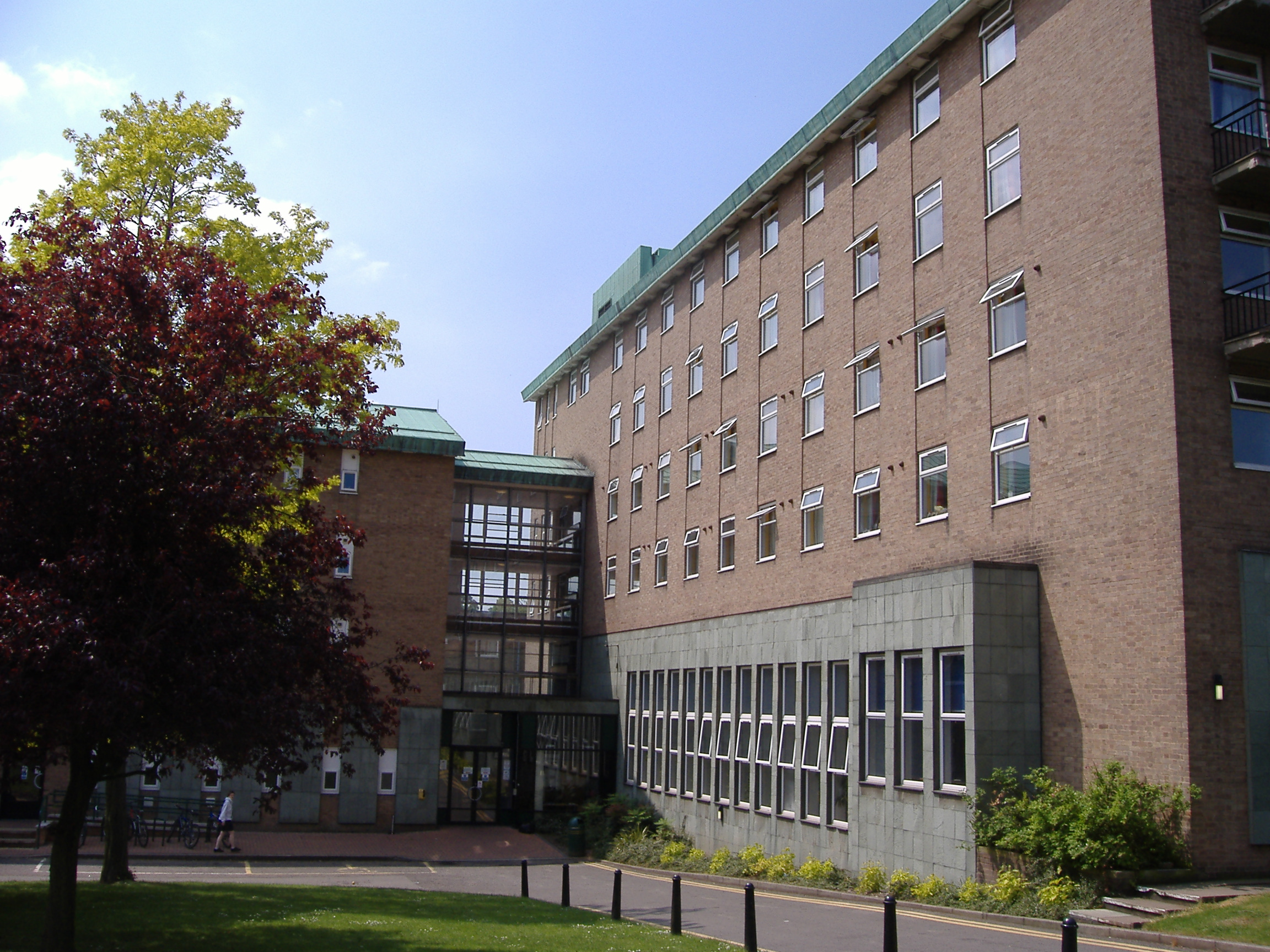
Willoughby Hall

Willoughby Hall (52.9353°N 1.2051°W) is a mixed undergraduate hall of residence, built in 1964, and was a female hall at its inception, though now mixed for some time. It provides accommodation for around 260 students. The hall is named after the local Willoughby (or Willughby) family, whose family home Wollaton Hall is adjacent to the university campus. 2007 saw the addition of The Mix, now named Vesper, the largest of the 4 remaining hall bars on campus. It also features a TV room alongside the JCR; in addition to a study room, it also features a centrally timetabled seminar room known as the Machicado Suite and boardroom (Morton Colville Suite). The hall is located near the west entrance of the university, close to Broadgate Park.

== Jubilee Campus ==
As of September 2011 all of the Jubilee Campus halls fall under the authority of a single warden. At present the Jubilee Campus halls warden is Dr Slawomir Sujeki.

=== Melton ===
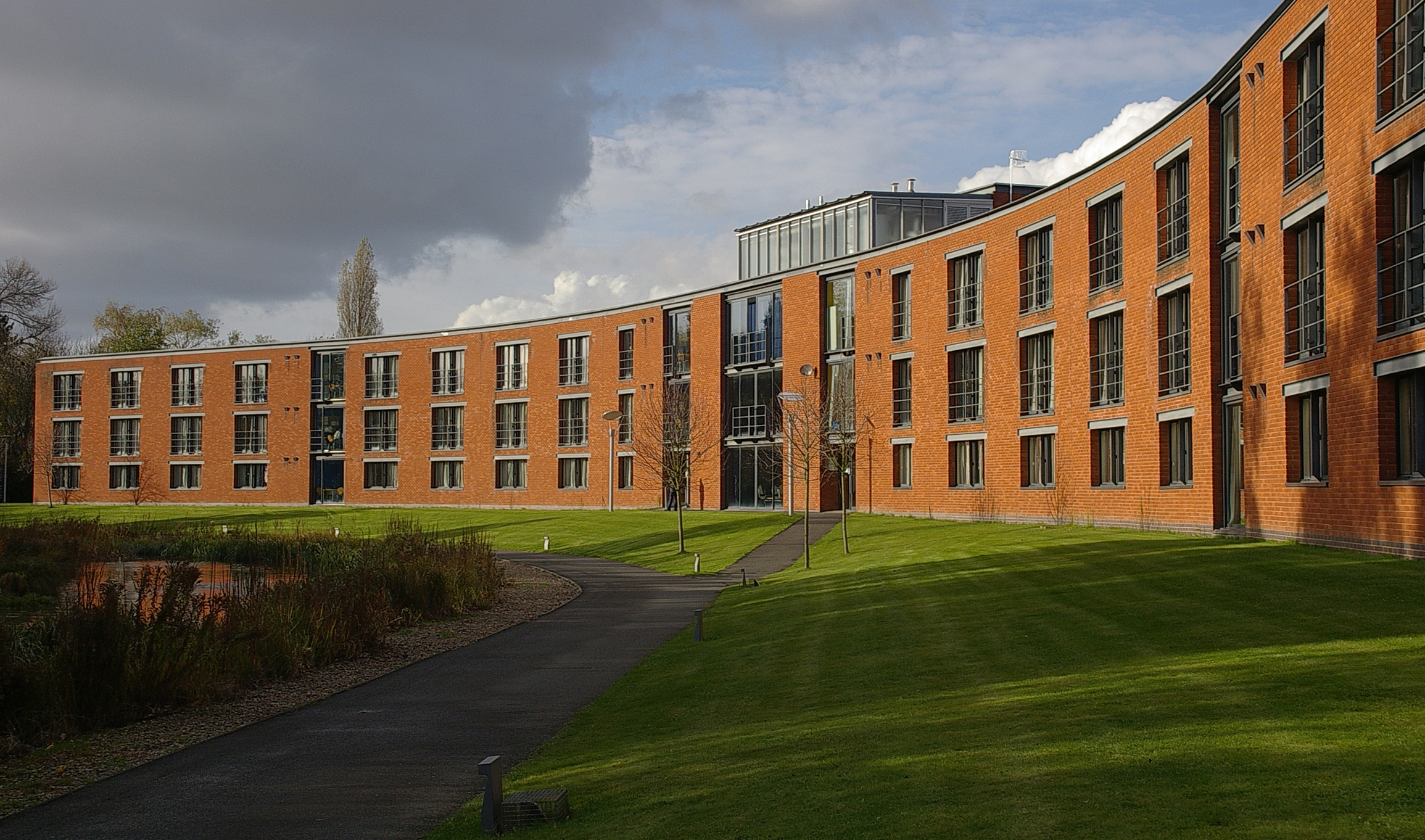
Melton Hall

Melton Hall is the university's only postgraduate hall of residence, and is named after the local town of Melton Mowbray. It provides accommodation for roughly 140 students in en-suite bedrooms and, along with the rest of the first stage of the campus, was designed by Sir Michael Hopkins. The hall is self-catered, with each kitchen shared by up to thirteen students. There are two common rooms and one study room.

=== Newark ===
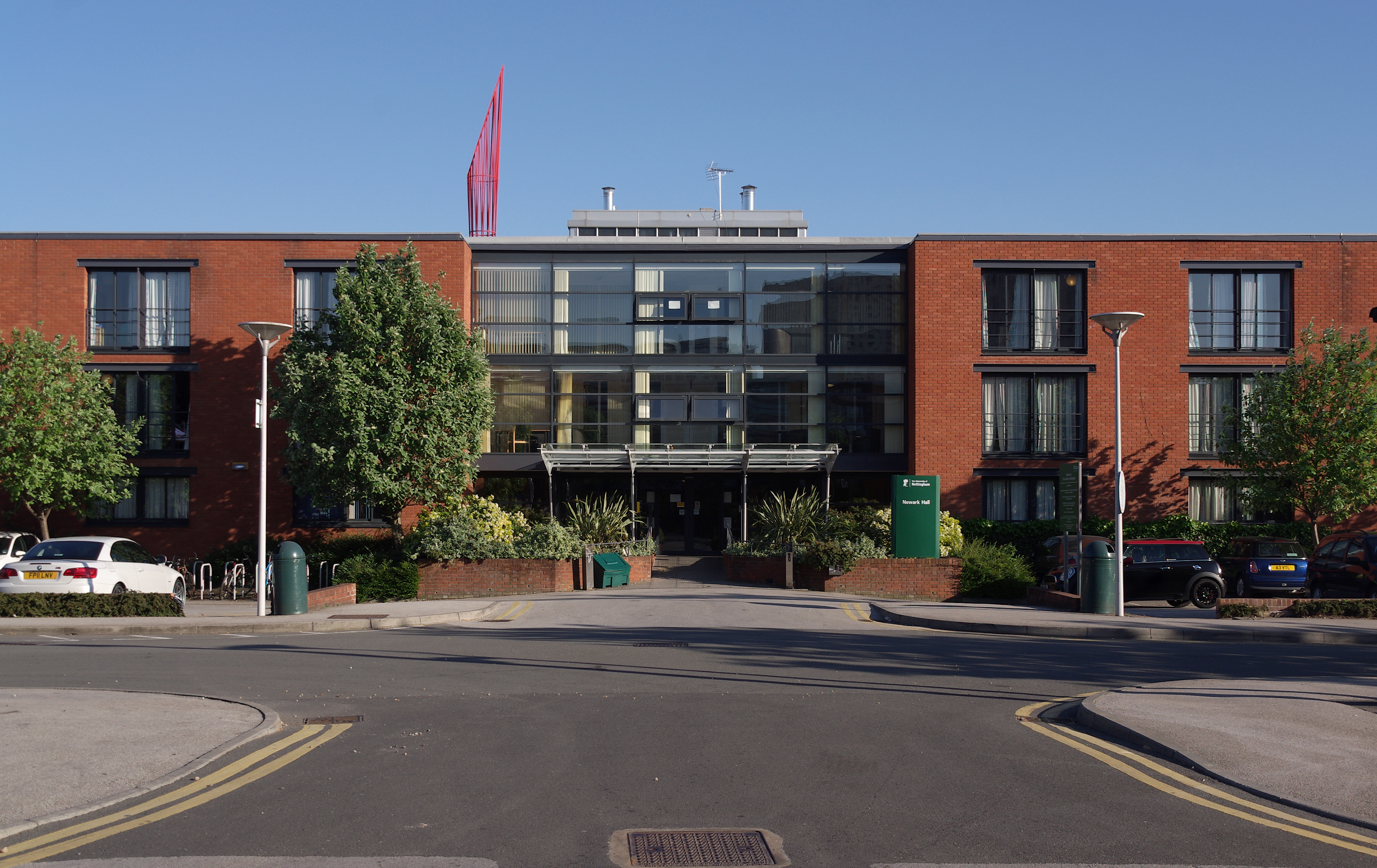
Newark Hall

Newark Hall is an undergraduate hall of residence named after the local town of Newark, sharing its coat of arms and motto "Deo Fretus Erumpe" ("Trust in God and Sally Forth"). Housing about 400 students, this makes it the second largest hall of residence in the university (after Bonington Hall). As the rest of the campus, it was designed by Sir Michael Hopkins in the shape of an eight framing two quads surrounded by the building. The current warden is Dr Slawomir Sujecki. Unlike University Park halls, Newark does not have its own catering facilities, residents instead eat in the nearby Atrium restaurant with Southwell residents.

=== Southwell ===
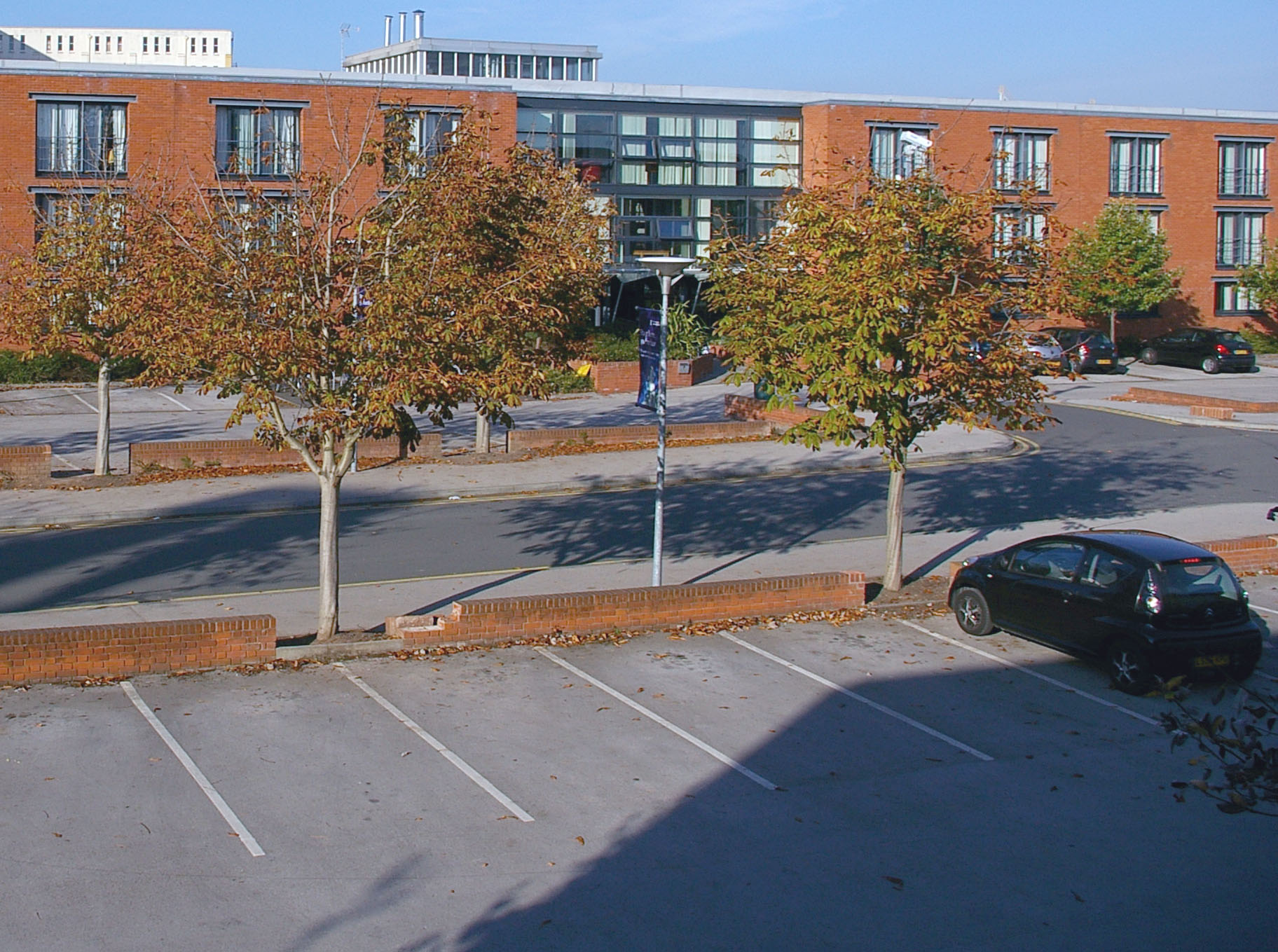
Southwell Hall (view from Newark Hall)

Southwell Hall is an undergraduate hall of residence named after the local town of Southwell. It houses about 200 students, and along with the rest of the first stage of the campus, was designed by Sir Michael Hopkins. The administrative team also cover Melton Hall. Unlike University Park halls, Southwell does not have its own catering facilities, residents instead eat in the nearby Atrium restaurant with Newark residents.

== Sutton Bonington Campus ==
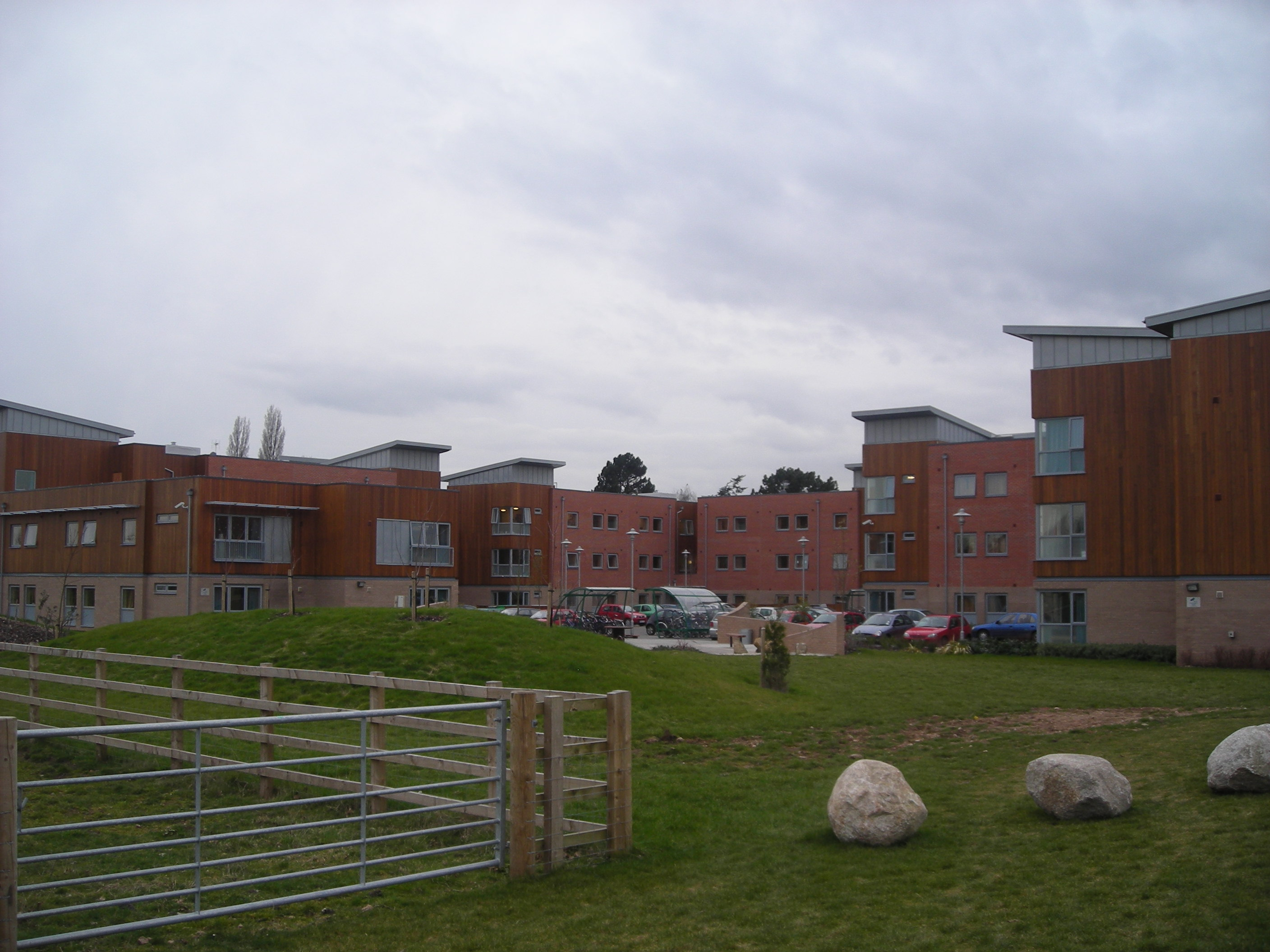
Stanford, Barton and Zouch were built in 2006

Bonington Halls is the name given by the university to the student accommodation (halls of residence) at Sutton Bonington Campus. It is a mixed-sex hall holding both undergraduates and postgraduates. In reality, it is not really a single hall, but a number of small separate "halls" and "houses" of varying age and design, holding between eight and sixty people, in addition to a shared dining room, laundry and bar. Bonington Halls house approximately 650 students. This makes it the university's largest hall of residence (regaining the title from Jubilee's Newark hall). The halls have a single JCR committee, but this operates more along the lines of the entertainment committee of the Student Guild as it arranges activities for both the residents of Bonington Halls and those students studying at Sutton Bonington but living off campus. The houses and halls at Sutton Bonington are named after local villages and are as follows:

- Kingston – the oldest hall, built just before the First World War and used to house German POWs during the war; until recently it was an all-male hall
- Normanton – originally built as an all-female hall, and remained so until recently
- Wymeswold
- Ratcliffe
- Rempstone
- Kegworth
- Dishley
- Hathern
- Lockington
- Zouch
- Stanford
- Barton
- Costock
- Thrumpton
- Eviton House – postgraduate-only house at the far end of the arboretum
- St. Michaels Flats – located nearer the village itself, these house students with families, mainly international students

== University-arranged self-catering accommodation ==
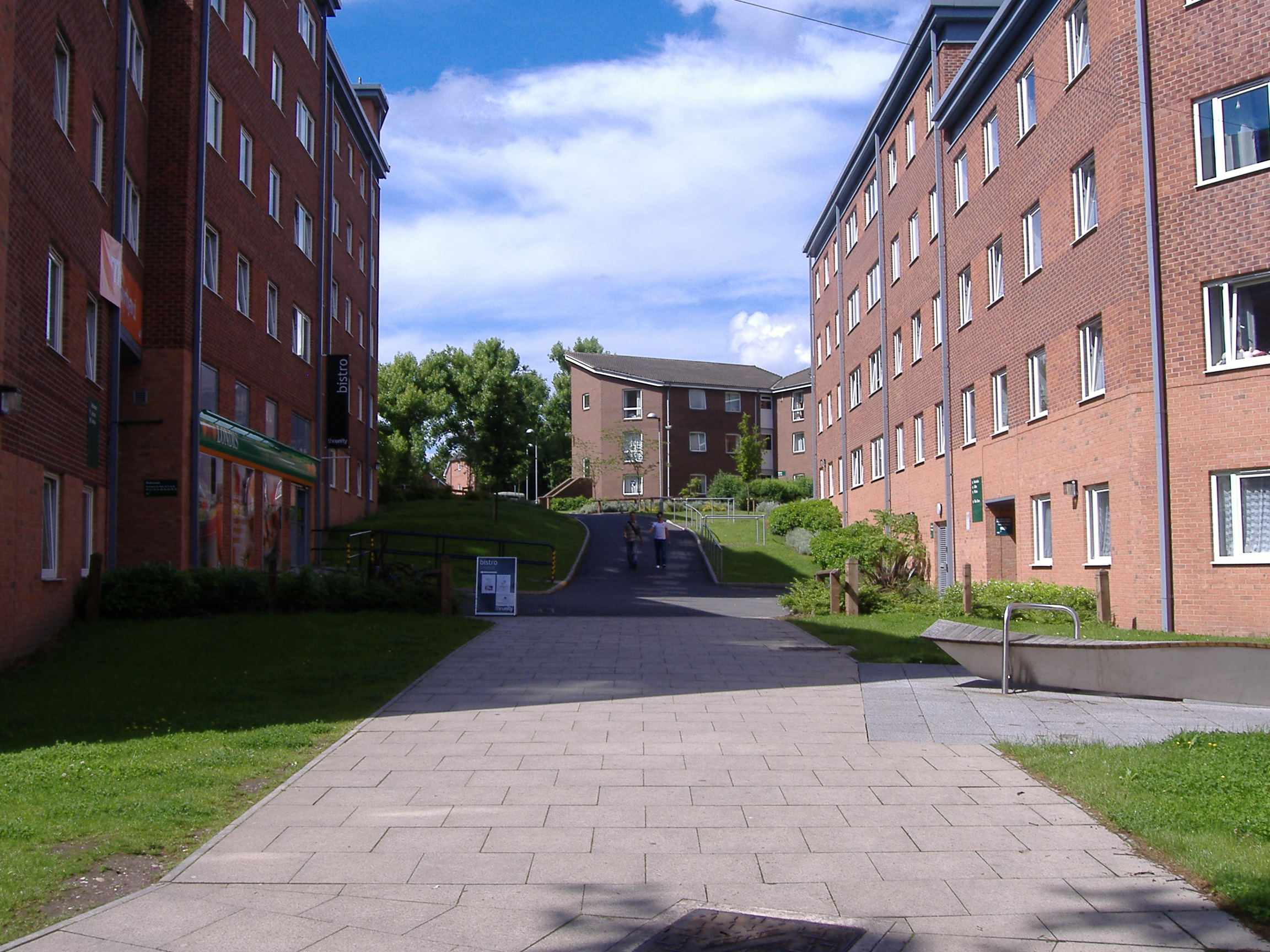
Part of the newer section of Broadgate Park.

- Broadgate Park is a collection of self catered student accommodation of some 2400 undergraduate and postgraduate students. It is operated privately by UPP (Broadgate Park) Ltd and is situated immediately to the southwest of University Park, between the campus and the town of Beeston.
- Raleigh Park is a self-catering hall located close to Jubilee Campus, though not very close to the university campus. It is owned and operated by Derwent Living. It consists of five courts: Sillitoe, Madison, Roddice, Byron and Chatterley.
- St. Peter's Court is a self-catering hall, owned and managed by Unite, who run numerous other third party halls across the country. Recently extended it can now house over 800 students all with en suite rooms.
- Cloister House is a self-catering hall, owned and managed by UPP (Broadgate Park) Ltd, housing almost 70 postgraduate students outside the south east corner of University Park in the Dunkirk area.
- Albion House is a self-catering hall, owned and managed by UPP (Broadgate Park) Ltd, housing mainly undergraduate students and situated in the town of Beeston.

== Defunct Halls ==
=== Beeston ===
Beeston Hall provided accommodation for 225 students between 2018-2023. It opened in the 2018–19 academic year owing to an accommodation shortage. Built on the site of the old sports centre, which preceded the new David Ross Sports Village, it was constructed of ‘modular” buildings, provided by Portakabin. The first intake of students were notably housed in hotels across the city until November 2018, as the building was not complete in time for the start of the academic year. A JCR (junior common room) was added soon after opening, residents previously used facilities at Nightingale. There was no dining room; residents dined at the nearby Rutland Hall. The hall was intended to be used for just two years, this was extended up to the 2022-23 academic year, at the end of which the buildings were dismantled.

University Hall was a hall-grouping to which all off-campus students belonged in the days before such a group became so large that it was meaningless to attempt to make it conform with the halls system. The hall was dissolved in the 1990s.

Wortley Hall was a hall named after the last Principal of University College Nottingham, Harry Wortley. It was located in the extreme north of University Park in Lenton Firs House. The hall was subsumed by New Lenton Hall in the 1980s, with the School of Architecture (now the School of the Built Environment) taking over the occupation of Lenton Firs.

== Facilities ==
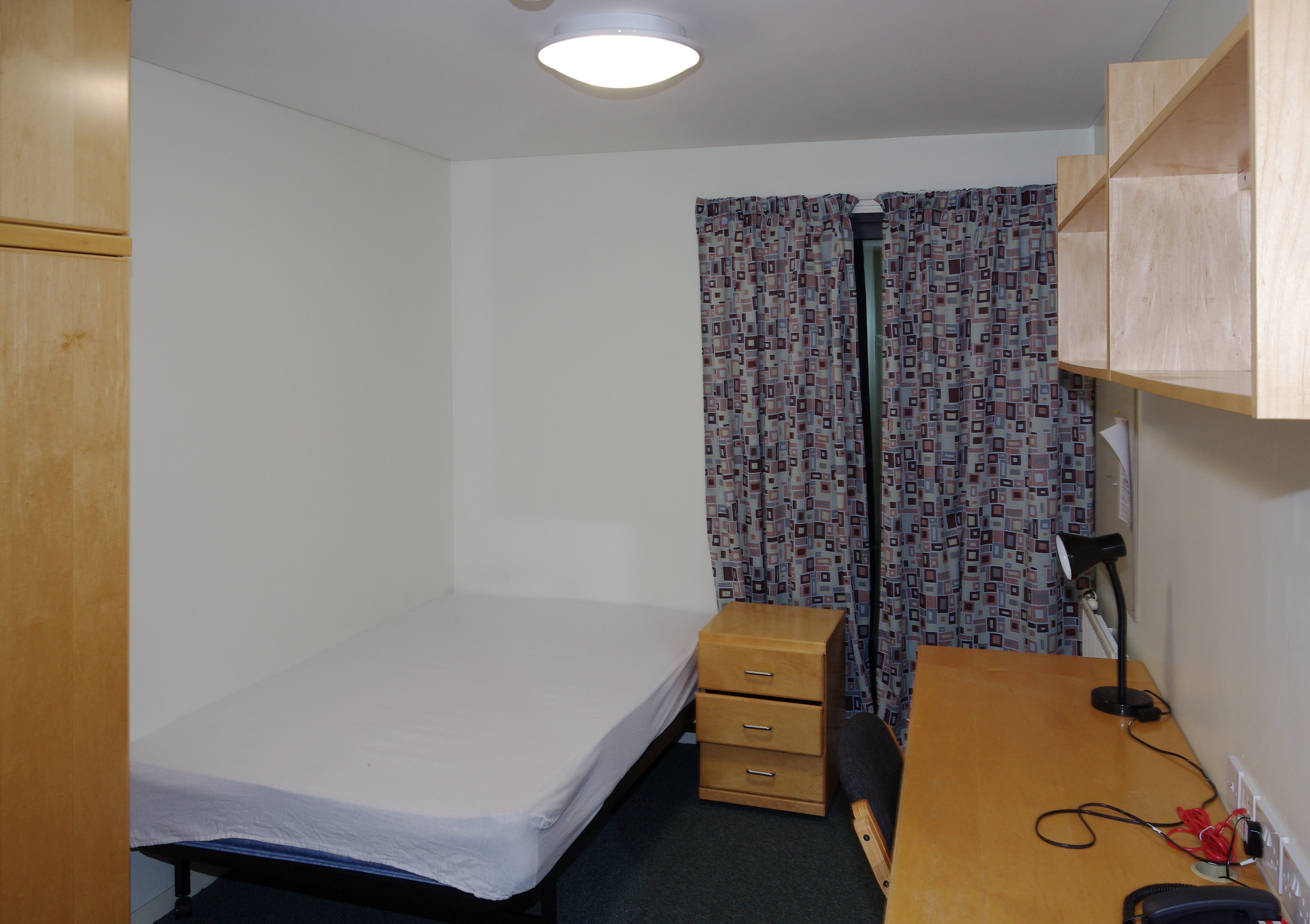
Interior of a standard room in Melton Hall.

Facilities vary by hall, but most halls have a bar, common room, study room, pantries (with kettle, sink, fridge/freezer and microwave) and laundry facilities. Melton Hall is self-catered, and has full kitchens rather than pantries. Rooms vary in size and equipment; most rooms on University Park have shared bathroom facilities, while all rooms on Jubilee Campus have en-suite bathrooms. The basic equipment provided with a bedroom includes a bed (usually a half-double), wardrobe, bedside table, desk, chair, lamp, pinboard and mirror. Internet access is provided, with both wired and wireless connections available. Undergraduate rooms include a small fridge.
