= Don Rees =

Welsh mathematician (1937–2025)

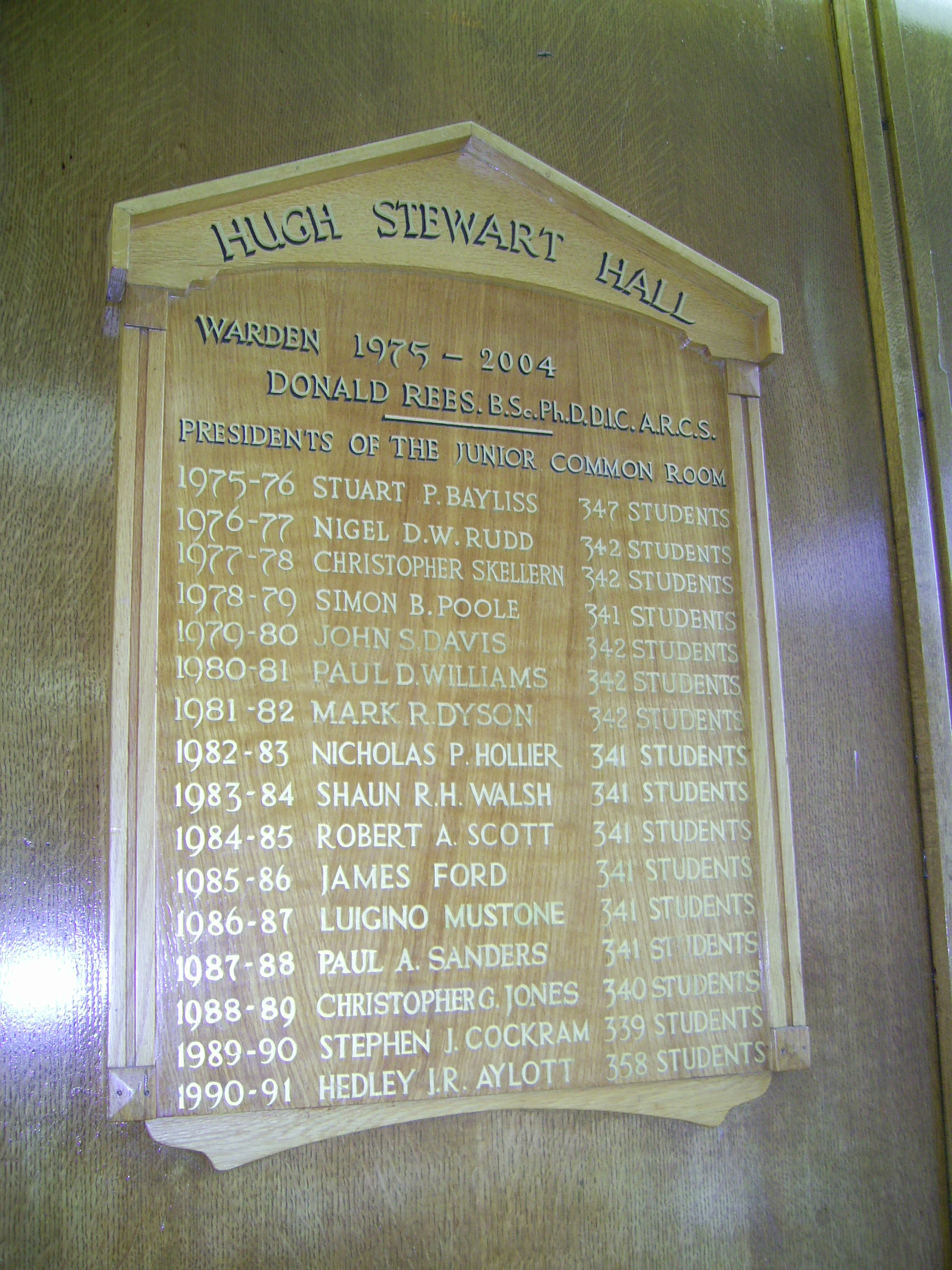
Hugh Stewart Hall JCR Presidents Board, 1975–1991, detailing Dr. Rees's wardenship and post-nominal letters

Donald Rees (24 March 1939 – 17 January 2025) was a Welsh mathematician who was the warden of Hugh Stewart Hall in the University of Nottingham for 29 years (1975 to 2004). Dr. Rees was a highly respected academic, being a professor of mathematics, and a leading member of the university community. He was the last warden to inhabit the Warden's House at Hugh Stewart in its entirety. The Hall library is now named after Dr. Rees in recognition of his service to the Hall, the university and the city.

== Life and career ==
Rees arrived in Nottingham with a London Ph.D. in Mathematics and was one of the first tutors recruited at the opening of Lincoln Hall in 1962. As with many of his Welsh countrymen, his twin passions were rugby football and music, being an accomplished pianist. According to old Lincolnites of that era he was a lively and popular tutor, and the rugby team especially flourished with his encouragement.

In 1972 he was appointed Deputy Warden of Cripps Hall and then three years later he made the short move to Hugh Stewart. Certainly he fought hard to maintain the best traditions of Nottingham's Halls, for example keeping a schedule of one Formal Dinner each week, open to all students, when almost all other Halls had reduced to two per term. Additionally Hugh Stewart continually staged concerts of a high standard, often hosting the Sinfonia String Quartet. HM the Queen visited the hall on June 4th, 1981.

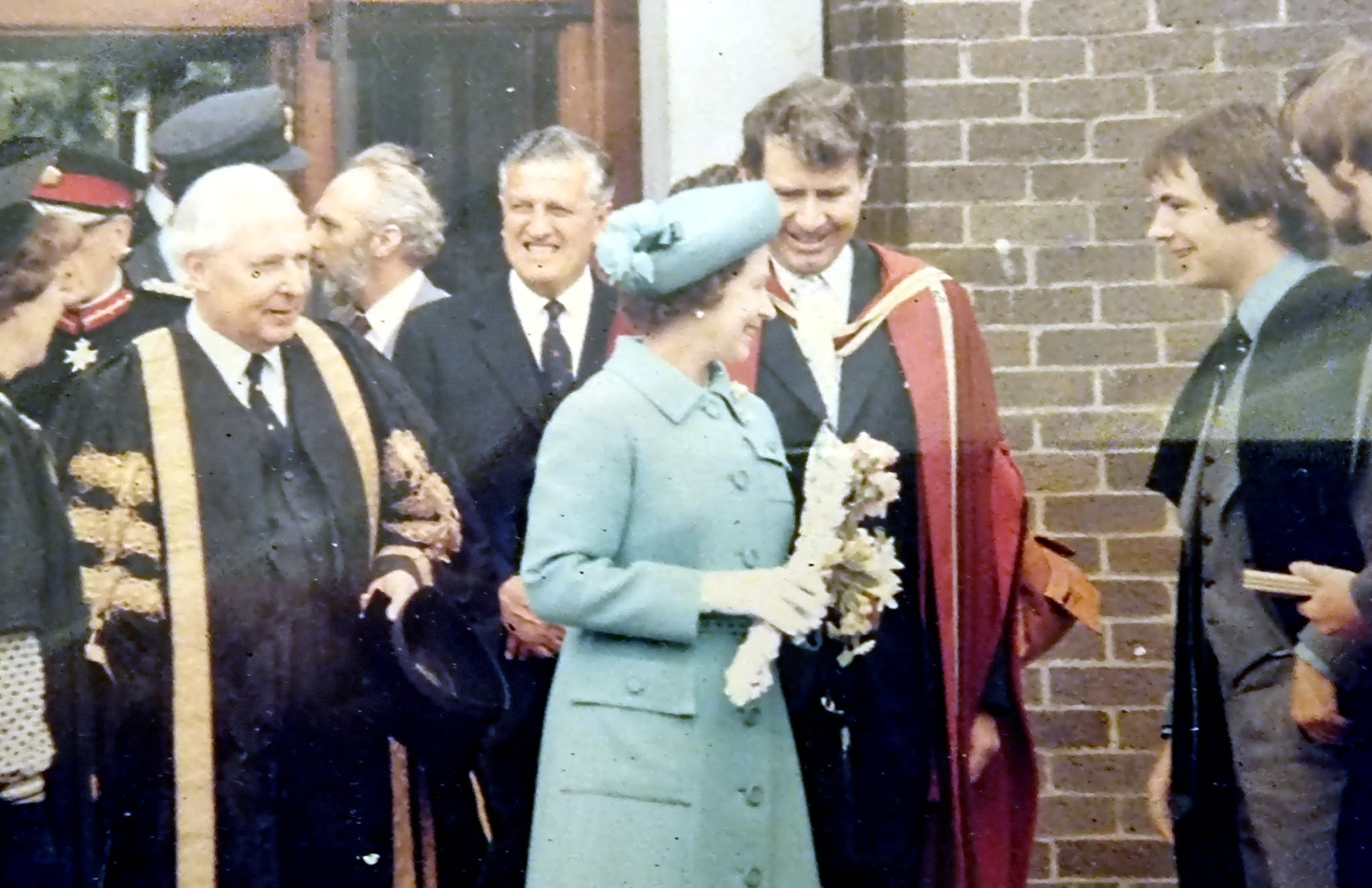
Queen Elizabeth visiting Nottingham University, Hugh Stewart Hall.

During his time at Hugh Stewart, the university progressively reduced the power and influence of all Wardens, especially with regard to finance, staffing and maintenance of the fabric. Nevertheless, in the history of the university, perhaps only Dr Harry Lucas, Warden of first Wortley and then Cripps (who was said to be one of Vice-Chancellor Hallward's most trusted advisers in the 1950s and 60s) worked harder to the benefit of the entire Hall system.

Rees died on 17 January 2025, at the age of 85.
