= Goldthorn Park =

Suburb of Wolverhampton, West Midlands, England

Coordinates: 52.563°N 2.129°W

Goldthorn Park is a suburb of Wolverhampton, West Midlands. It is situated 1½ miles south of the city centre within the Blakenhall ward. It mostly consists of private houses built from the 1930s onwards.

== History ==
The area is historically located within the Manor of Sedgley. In 1935, the Earl of Dudley offered building plots for sale by auction; the advertisement gave the total area of the estate as 230 acres (93 ha) and was expected when fully developed to provide over 2,000 houses. The original plan for the estate included bowling greens, croquet lawns and a golf course, but none of these developments were ever built.

A proposal in 1962 to move Goldthorn Park from Sedgley Urban District to Wolverhampton was met with opposition from residents and Sedgley Council. A spokesman for the council said Goldthorn Park had "good severance" from Wolverhampton, was not its dormitory and had no special links with the town to justify the change. Another speaker while admitting Goldthorn Park geographically was a continuation of the Wolverhampton town area added that it had "strong local community feeling" and residents did not want to lose its ward status and become a "mere appendage" of a larger Wolverhampton ward, where their voice would not be heard. Nevertheless, reorganisation in 1966 resulted in Goldthorn Park being incorporated into Wolverhampton despite most of Sedgley being incorporated into the County Borough of Dudley. It could be argued that the Seven Cornfields dividing the rest of the Sedgley built up area from Goldthorn Park as being a factor. However, the Sedgley links are still there in street names on the original 1930s part of the estate as they are named after members of the Earl of Dudley's family (including Ward Road, Ednam Road, Rosemary Crescent, Jeremy Road) and Dudding Road is named after one of the Earl's staff.

The original estate was built upon farmland but in the 1960s and 1970s further housing was built on land of the disused Sedgley Park Colliery up to the A459 road, which forms the suburb's eastern boundary. In 1969 Wolverhampton Corporation supported a plan to build 1,500 houses on land adjoining the estate to the south, however the Minister for Housing and Local Government vetoed the development over Green Belt concerns.

== Park Hall ==
The Park Hall Hotel, a popular venue for private functions, was originally Sedgley Park Hall, built circa 1705 for the Lords of the Manor of Sedgley. In 1757 the 6th Baron Ward vacated Sedgley Park and took up residence at Himley Hall, 3 miles (4.8 km) away. From 1763 until 1868 the building served as the Roman Catholic Sedgley Park School — the first post-Reformation Catholic boarding school for boys whose parents were 'in more confined circumstances'. The Hall is grade II listed and has had significant alterations and extensions over the years.

== Schools ==
Colton Hills Community School is an 11-18 school, based on the estate since 1975. It replaced the Municipal Grammar School in Whitmore Reans, Penn Secondary Modern School and Graiseley Secondary School. When the school opened it was known as Colton Hills Upper School with the former Penn Secondary school (which was renamed Colton Hills Lower School) retained for use by first and second year pupils until expansion of the main site finally saw the Lower School close.

Goldthorn Park Primary School was established in 1947 and is built over the Sedgley Park rifle range. In November 1997 poems written by the primary schoolchildren were printed and displayed inside local buses. The school is part of the Elston Hall Learning Trust group of schools.

== Bibliography ==
- Sedgley Urban District Council Yearbooks, 1953-1958, Sedgley, West Midlands (Formerly Staffordshire).
- Wolverhampton's Locally Listed Buildings
