= Inez de Castro (warden) =

Nottingham-based educator

Inez de Castro (c.1876 – 1946) was a lecturer in English Language and first Warden of Florence Boot Hall at University College Nottingham. De Castro became Lecturer in English Language at University College Nottingham in 1914. She additionally worked as warden of several women's halls of residence at the university, beginning in 1914 at Hylton House and later Cavendish House, both located in central Nottingham. She became the first warden of Florence Boot Hall, a purpose built women's hall of residence, on University Park, from 1928 to 1942.
