= Humphrey Cripps =

English businessman and philanthropist

Sir Cyril Humphrey Cripps DL (2 October 1915 – 14 April 2000) was an English businessman and a philanthropist.

Humphrey Cripps was educated at Northampton School For Boys and studied Natural Sciences at St John's College, Cambridge. He joined the family firm, Pianoforte Supplies Limited, started by his father in 1919 to make the metal components of pianos (the firm grew into a major supplier of metal fittings for other trades, especially the motor industry). Cripps became Managing Director in 1960 and Chairman in 1979.

The decline in the British car industry in the 1970s caused Cripps to diversify his business interests, and he invested abroad, playing a major role in the creation of Velcro Industries. By these means he continued to channel funds into the family charitable foundation. Pianoforte Supplies Limited (PSL), the creator of the wealth, failed to sufficiently diversify under his stewardship. Whilst Howard Clayton-Wright was purchased in 1979 and became Pianoforte Supplies Plastics, PSL ceased to produce piano parts in 1980. Although the firm made a significant number of parts for other industries such as aerospace and white goods, PSL saw a decline in its work over the succeeding two decades. In 1995, 879 people were employed. By 2000 this had fallen to 598 and by 2009, 89. A decision was made to close the factory in 2010.

The Cripps Foundation is a charity established in 1956 by the Cripps family which has made huge gifts to universities, colleges, schools, churches, hospitals and museums. Many Cambridge Colleges have benefited from this generosity, as well as the Fitzwilliam Museum. Halls of residence at St John's College, Magdalene College, Selwyn College, Queens' College and the University of Nottingham are named after the Cripps family. His former school also benefitted. The construction of many of the facilities were made possible through his generous donations.

Public recognition came to both Cripps and, before him, his father Cyril: both were knighted and Cripps, after many years of service to Northamptonshire County Council, became High Sheriff and later Deputy Lieutenant of the County.

Cripps was also a noted stamp collector. In 2011, the auction firm of Spink & Son in London began a series of sales of his so-called Chartwell Collection, which stretched to fill 84 stamp albums. The first sessions included rare 19th-century stamps of Great Britain and Mauritius, some of which set new world record prices, such as the Mauritius "Post Office" two-penny blue stamp selling for over £1 million.
