= Alfred Barrow Health Centre =

Coordinates: 54.1098°N 3.2248°W

Alfred Barrow Health Centre is a primary care health centre in Barrow-in-Furness.

It is housed in a refurbishment of the former Alfred Barrow School with a newly built extension housing the patient-facing services and all clinical spaces. It was developed by a public private partnership, eLIFT Cumbria, involving Community Health Partnerships. It has a base for the North West Ambulance Service. The contractor was ESH Construction. It opened in November 2019 with a celebration event.

It houses three GP surgeries - Abbey Road Surgery, Risedale Surgery, Atkinson Health Centre - and services provided by North Cumbria Integrated Care NHS Foundation Trust, Lancashire and South Cumbria NHS Foundation Trust and University Hospitals of Morecambe Bay NHS Foundation Trust as well as facilities for Morecambe Bay CCG, BAE Systems and Boots Pharmacy.
