= University Partnerships Programme =

UPP Group Holdings Limited
- Company type: Private
- Industry: University University infrastructure and accommodation
- Founded: 1998
- Headquarters: London, England, UK
- Key people: Elaine Hewitt, Chief Executive Officer
- Products: University infrastructure and accommodation
- Number of employees: 800+

UPP Group Holdings Limited, trading as University Partnerships Programme (UPP), is a provider of on-campus residential and academic infrastructure. UPP is a real estate investment trust.

UPP has over 36,000 rooms in operation or under construction through long-term, bespoke partnerships with 15 UK universities.

With over 800 employees, since 1998 UPP has invested over £3bn in the UK higher education sector and provided homes to over 400,000 students.

UPP founded the UPP Foundation which is a registered charity.

== UPP's university partners ==
- University of Exeter
- University of Hull
- University of Kent
- Lancaster University
- Leeds Beckett University
- Imperial College London
- University of London
- Loughborough University
- University of Nottingham
- Nottingham Trent University
- Oxford Brookes University
- University of Plymouth
- University of Reading
- University of York
- Swansea University
