= Higher Grade School =

Type of school in England

A Higher Grade School was a kind of educational establishment which flourished in England from 1876 until shortly after they were declared illegal in the Cockerton Judgement of 1899. They provided educational services regarded as higher than that of an elementary school.
