= Highgate Common =

Protected area in Staffordshire, England

- Site of Special Scientific Interest
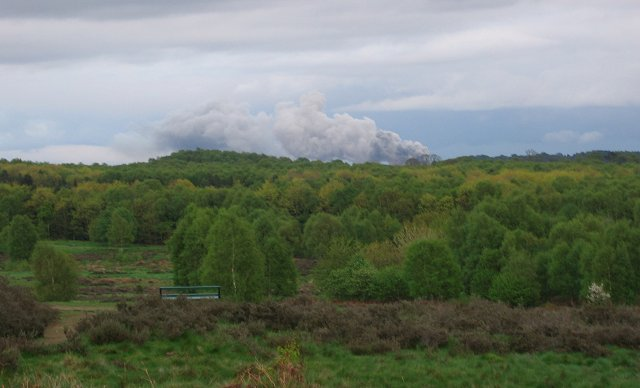
- Location of Highgate Common.
- Area of search: Staffordshire
- Grid reference: SO 839 900
- Coordinates: 52.5064°N 2.2399°W
- Interest: Biological
- Area: 115.92 hectares (1.159 km^{2}; 0.4476 sq mi)
- Notification date: 2007

Highgate Common is a Staffordshire Wildlife Trust reserve containing a mix of heathland and woodland. It is about 116 hectares or 286 acres in size. The common is a popular leisure destination and a Site of Special Scientific Interest, located in Southern Staffordshire, England.

== Location ==
Highgate Common is situated to the west of the West Midlands conurbation, on a ridge above the Smestow valley. By road it is 1.2 miles from Swindon, 1.7 miles from Enville, 4.5 miles from Wombourne, 9 miles from Perton and 10 miles from Wolverhampton.

== Management ==
Since April 2009 Highgate Common has been owned and managed by the Staffordshire Wildlife Trust.

The site was previously managed by South Staffordshire District Council.

A warden is present most days and their duties are aided by various support staff and volunteers.

== Wildlife ==
Highgate Common contains one of a small number of lowland heaths in Staffordshire, which are highly prized as habitats. However, the heath is not the whole of the common and the vegetation is very varied for such a small area. The sandy heath is covered mainly with heather, broom and gorse, all flowering plants that play an important part in hosting invertebrates. There are areas of woodland, with silver birch and pedunculate oak as canopy and common bracken as ground cover, as well as coniferous plantation. There are roadside verges, areas of acidic grassland, patches of bare sand and earth, and small areas of wet heath, including two artificial ponds. The varied habitat results in a wide variety of animal life.

Highgate has 140 recorded species of fauna of which 36 are rare either nationally or regionally, 82 species of invertebrate 20 of which are regionally scarce and 51 are nationally scarce and 14 heathland specialist species. Nationally rare are at least four species of mining bees, creating burrows that are host to the kleptoparasitic cuckoo bees of the genera Nomada and Sphecodes. Also nationally rare are solitary wasps and wingless wasps and species that are regionally important include small red-tailed bumble bees and solitary bees.

Other animals, reptiles and insects include: common lizards, slowworms, grass snakes, rabbits, bush-crickets, moths, beetles, flies, and dragonflies.

== Geology and landscape ==
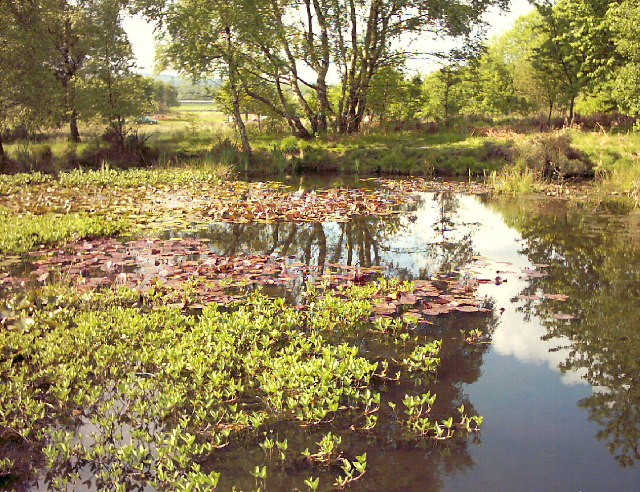
Highgate Common Pool.

The Common is located above the Smestow valley on the ridges of Mid-Severn Sandstone, a Bunter deposit of the Permian and Triassic periods, forming a series of low ridges on both sides of the Severn in Shropshire, Worcestershire and Staffordshire. Similar geology is prominently visible at nearby Kinver Edge and, further afield in the Midlands, at Cannock Chase and Sherwood Forest. Specifically, Highgate is mostly underlain by part of the Bridgnorth Sandstone Formation known as ‘Lower Mottled Soft Red Sandstone’. There are also small areas of Pleistocene sands and gravels.

The common is situated in a shallow valley on the plateau, like a dish sloping gently to the south. The land formation and vegetation together create a micro-climate warmer than expected for this part of England, with considerable impact on the local flora and fauna.

The thin, relatively dry, sandy soils were historically host to open woodland - predominantly birch, with some oak and beech. The locally conspicuous presence of "Swin-" in the names of villages surrounding the common, such as Swindon and Kingswinford, suggests the woods were used for pig-grazing by the Anglo-Saxon inhabitants. After the Norman Conquest, the area became part of the vast Kinver Forest, which stretched as far north as the edge of Wolverhampton. In the later Middle Ages, and especially from the 16th century, the forest was denuded. The result was a sandy heathland - a landscape created by humans, but fragile and valuable to wildlife.

The ground is particularly hospitable to rabbits, which have excavated large warrens. It was turned over to agriculture during World War II and concrete roads and channels were put in. However, with careful management, including regular thinning and reduction of the rapidly encroaching trees, a diverse habitat has been recreated, consisting mainly of heathland - of which heather is the most dominant plant - and open woodland with occasional ponds and bogs, over hilly and often rough terrain.

== Amenities ==
The Common is popular with walkers, especially dog walkers, and has a number of car parks. There are numerous footpaths, some way-marked and some affording wheelchair access, as well as bridle paths and several car parks. The long distance Staffordshire Way forms part of the footpath network on the Common, linking it to many other visitor attractions throughout Staffordshire and neighbouring counties. There are seats and picnic tables at many locations on the Common.

A new Warden's office was opened in February 2010, incorporating toilets, a conference room, information points, an additional car park and picnic facilities.
