= Smestow Brook =

River in the West Midlands of England

Smestow Brook or River Smestow or River Stour
- Etymology: Place of the smiths

Location
- Country: England
- Counties: West Midlands, Staffordshire
- District: Wolverhampton, South Staffordshire

Physical characteristics
- Source
  - location: Wolverhampton
  - coordinates: 52.59191°N 2.1206188°W
- Mouth
  - location: Prestwood, Staffordshire
  - coordinates: 52.4675047°N 2.2027346°W
- Length: 27 km (17 mi)

Basin features
- Tributaries
  - left: Graiseley Brook, Finchfield Brook, Wom Brook, Holbeche Brook, Dawley Brook
  - right: Black Brook, Spittle Brook

The Smestow Brook, sometimes called the River Smestow, is a small river that plays an important part in the drainage of Wolverhampton, South Staffordshire, and parts of Dudley in the United Kingdom, and has contributed to the industrial development of the Black Country. It is the most important tributary of the River Stour, Worcestershire and part of the River Severn catchment.

== Etymology and usage ==
The name of the stream may be of Anglo-Saxon origin, although it was not written down before the 14th century in the Middle English forms Smetheslall and Smethestalle. As late as the 19th century, the name was still generally rendered Smestall in surveys of the county. It means ″place of the smiths″. The whole of this part of the West Midlands was famed for iron production from the Middle Ages onwards. The nearby Kinver Forest and Wyre Forest supplied charcoal for smelting and working iron before the Industrial Revolution. Both the lower Smestow and the Stour were lined with bloomeries and forges, their water used for cooling and later to power simple machinery.

Some local people maintain that the lower part of the stream, approximately from Wombourne, is properly called the River Smestow, while the upper section is the Smestow Brook. Certainly the lower Smestow is much more impressive since dredging and course alterations in the 1990s. In practice, however, both forms are used for the whole length of the stream, with Smestow Brook predominating. Similarly, the term Smestow Valley is sometimes reserved for the narrow section from Aldersley to Wightwick, although it can be used for the entire catchment, including the much wider plain south of Trescott. The Smestow itself created neither of these features: it simply flows through a landscape opened up by glaciation in the last Ice Age.

== Course ==
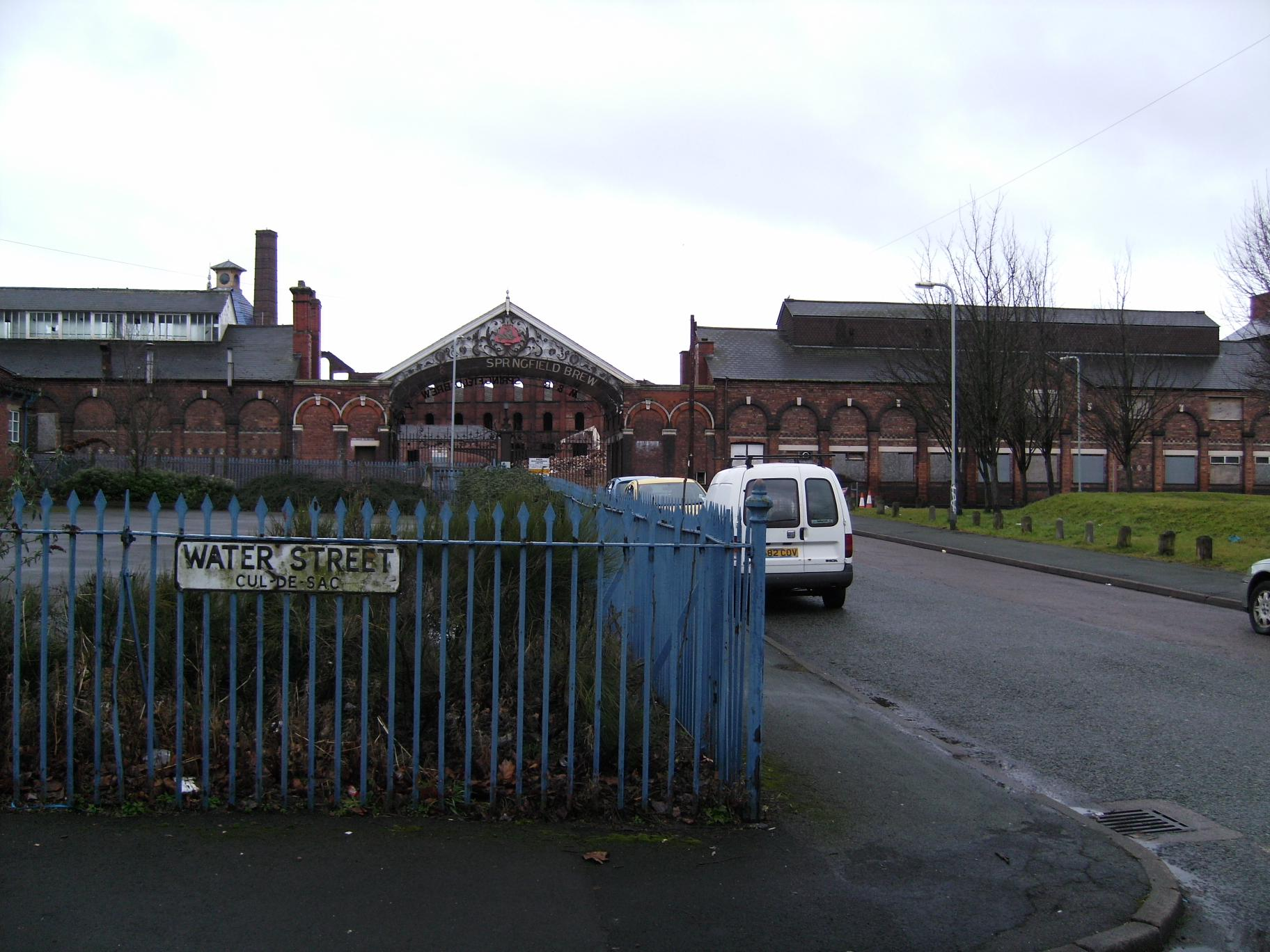
1. Putative source

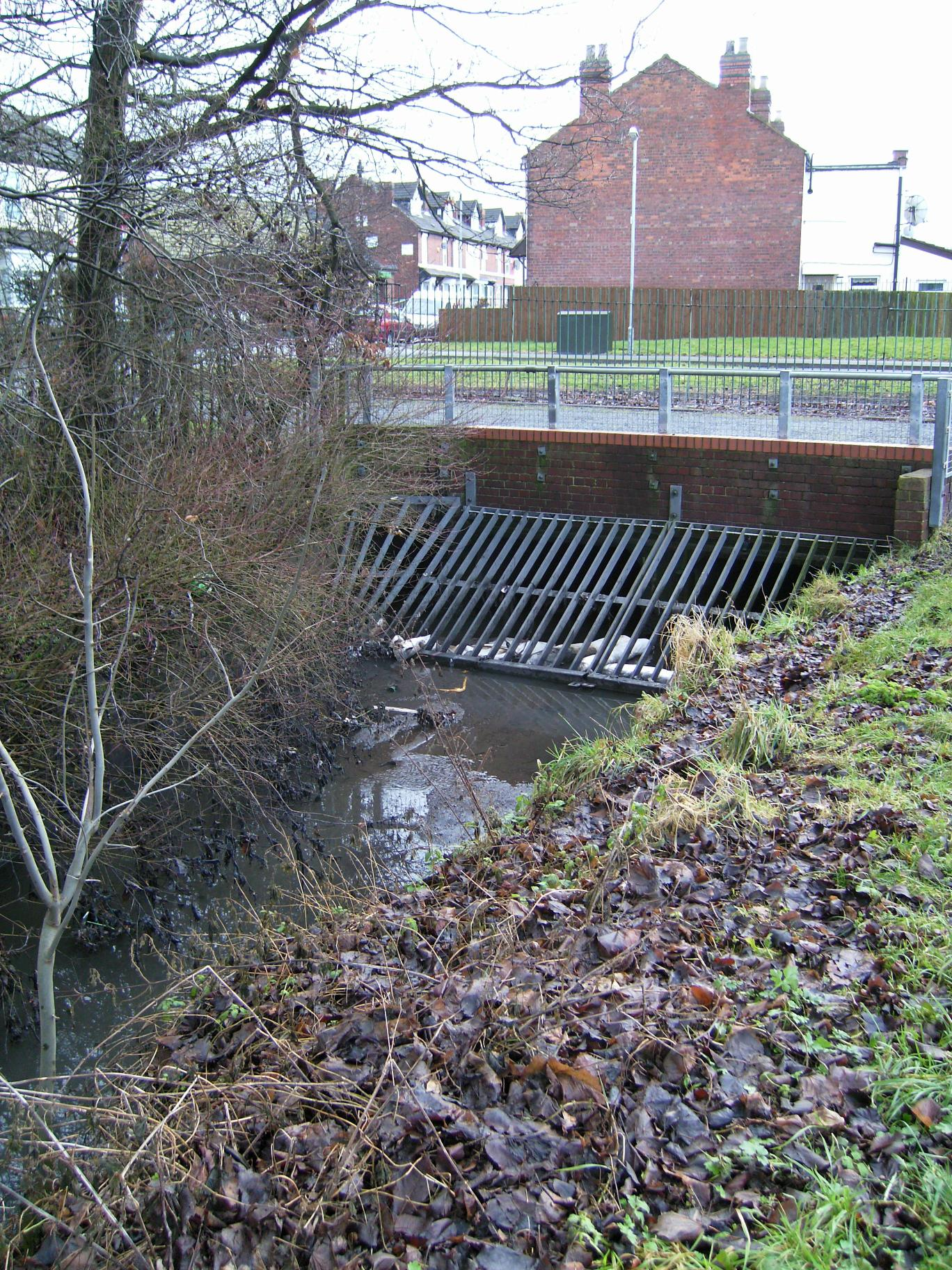
2. Emergence in Fowler's Park, Park Village, Wolverhampton

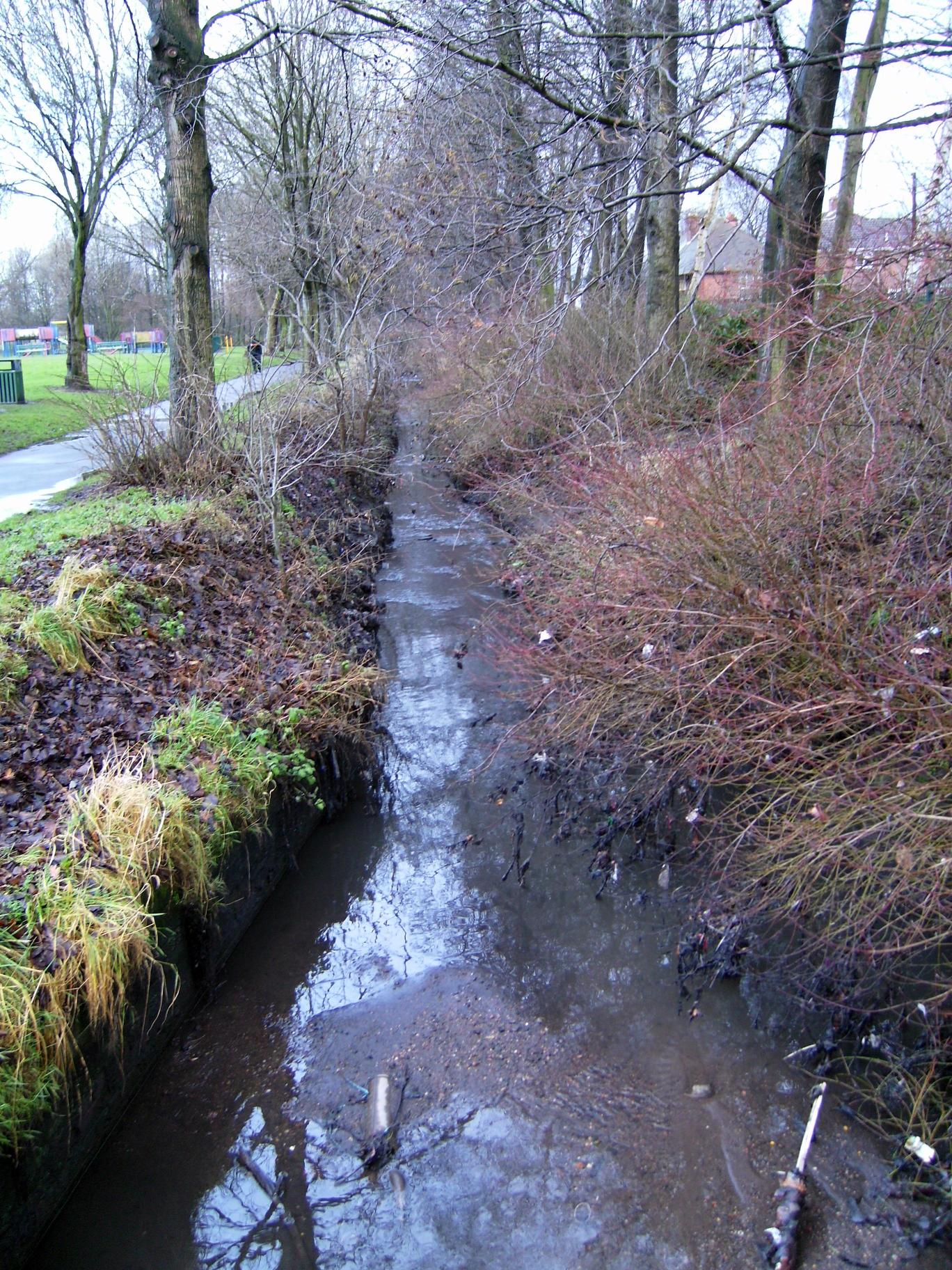
3. Flowing through Fowler's Park

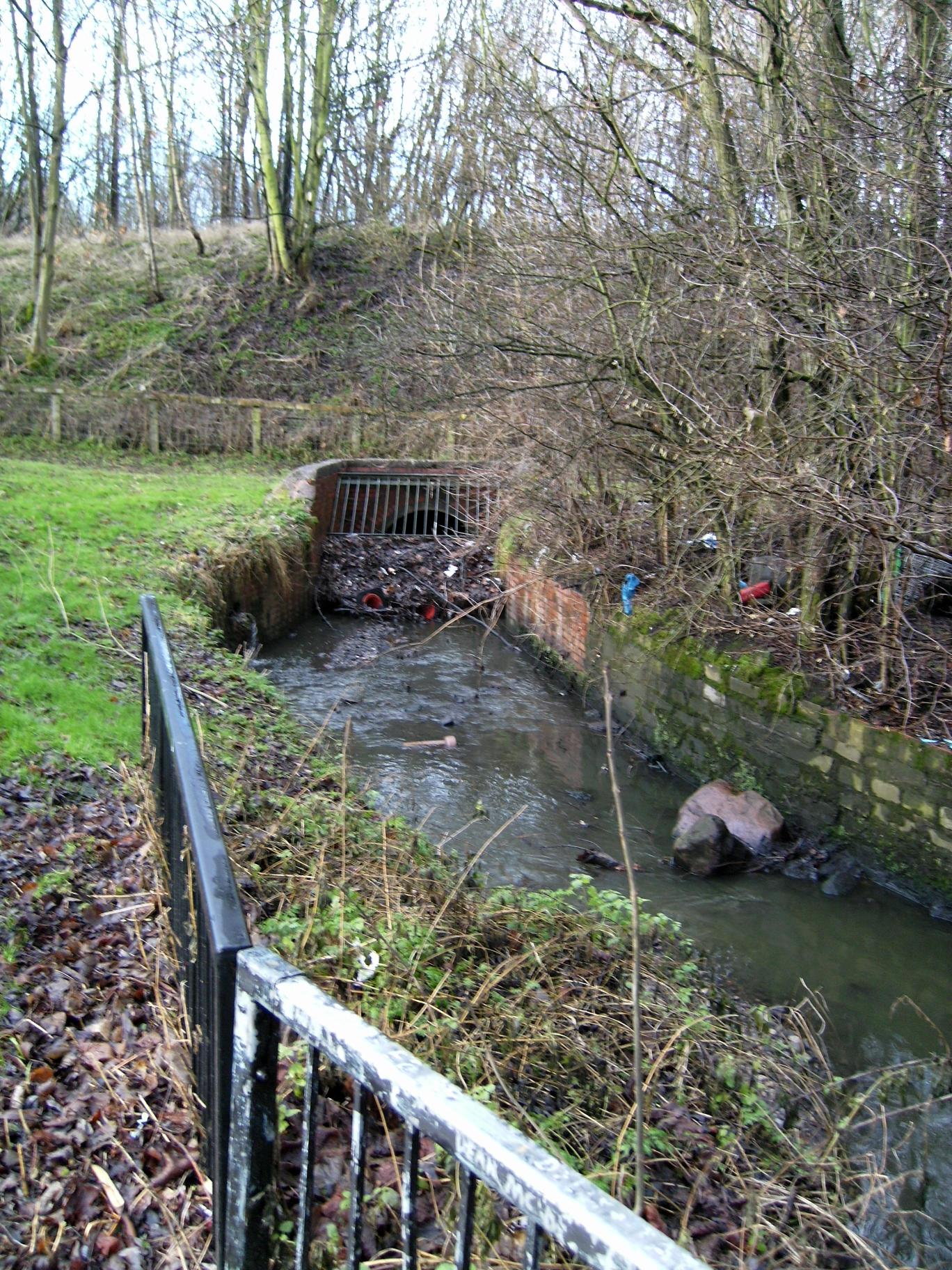
4. The brook disappears into a culvert

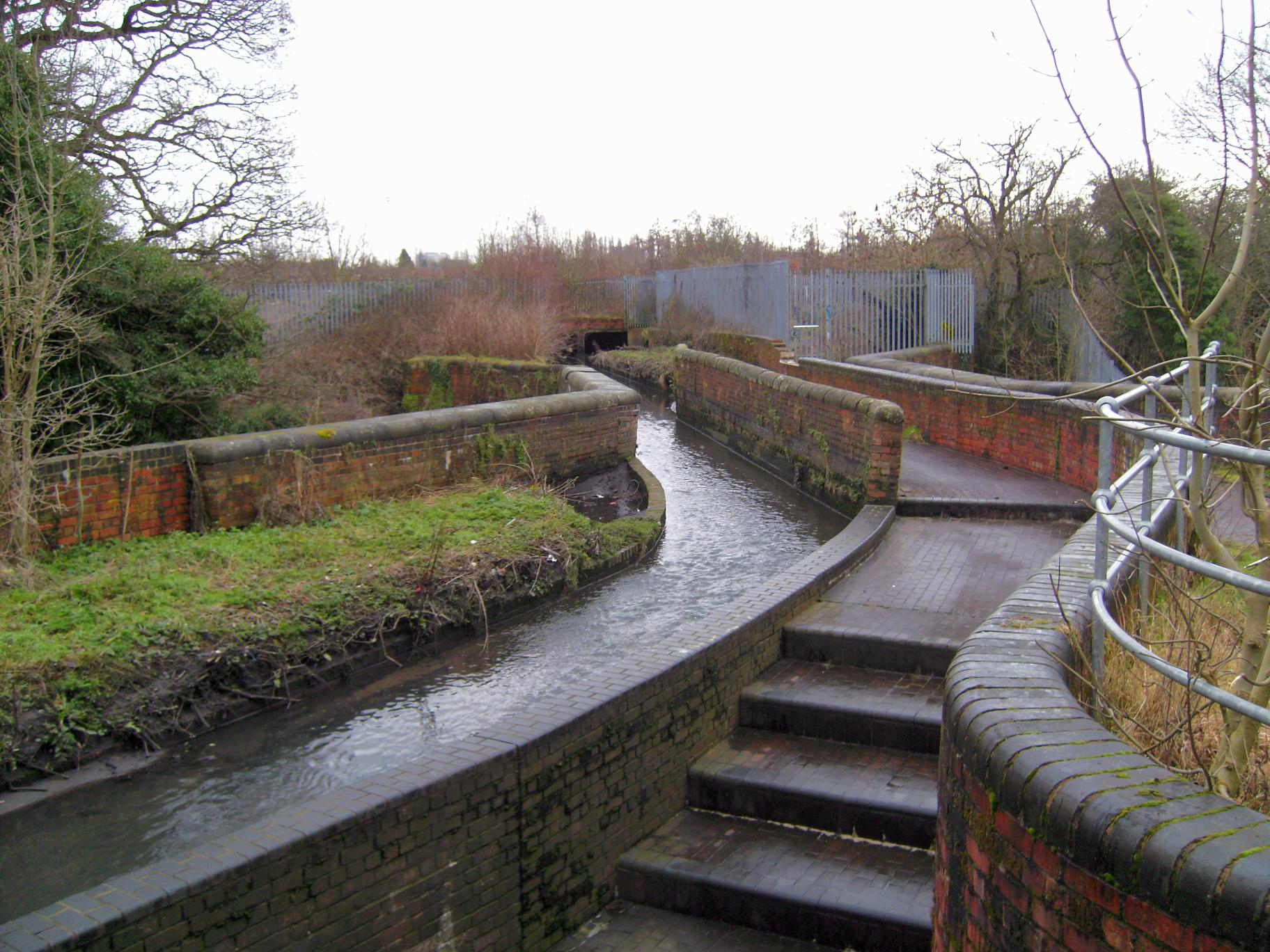
5. Over the Staffordshire and Worcestershire Canal by the Dunstall Water Bridge

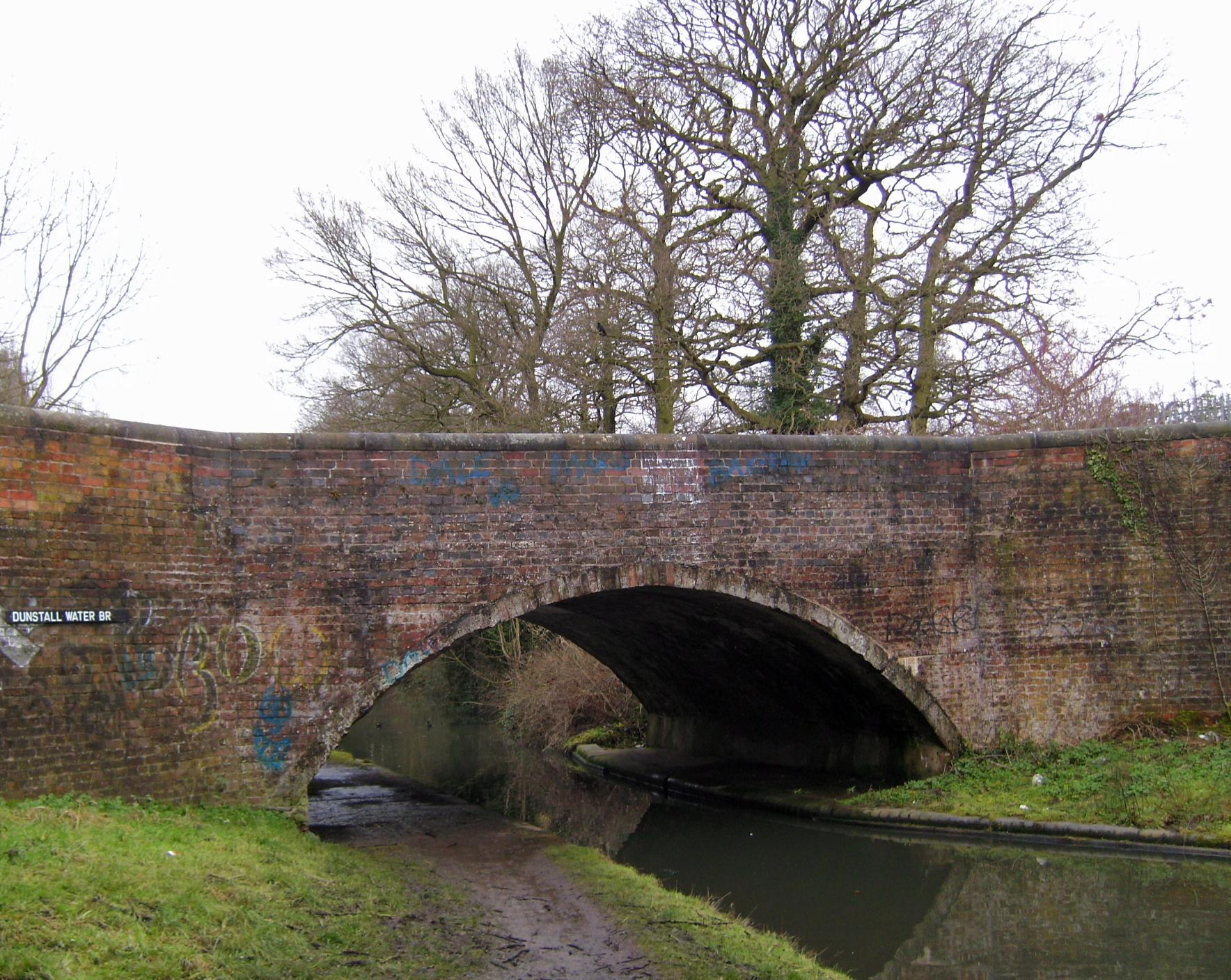
6. The Dunstall water Bridge viewed from the canal side

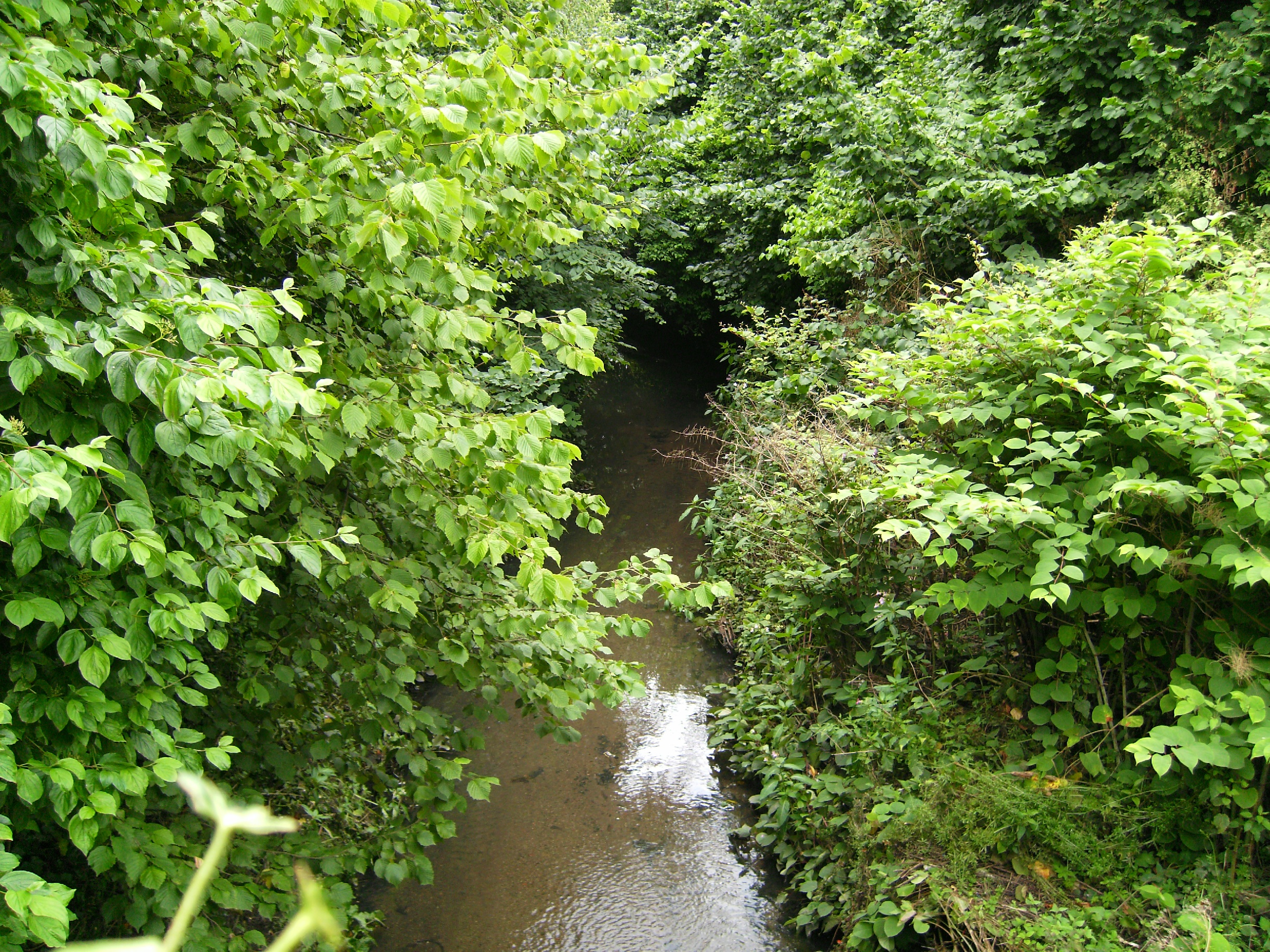
7. By Tettenhall Station

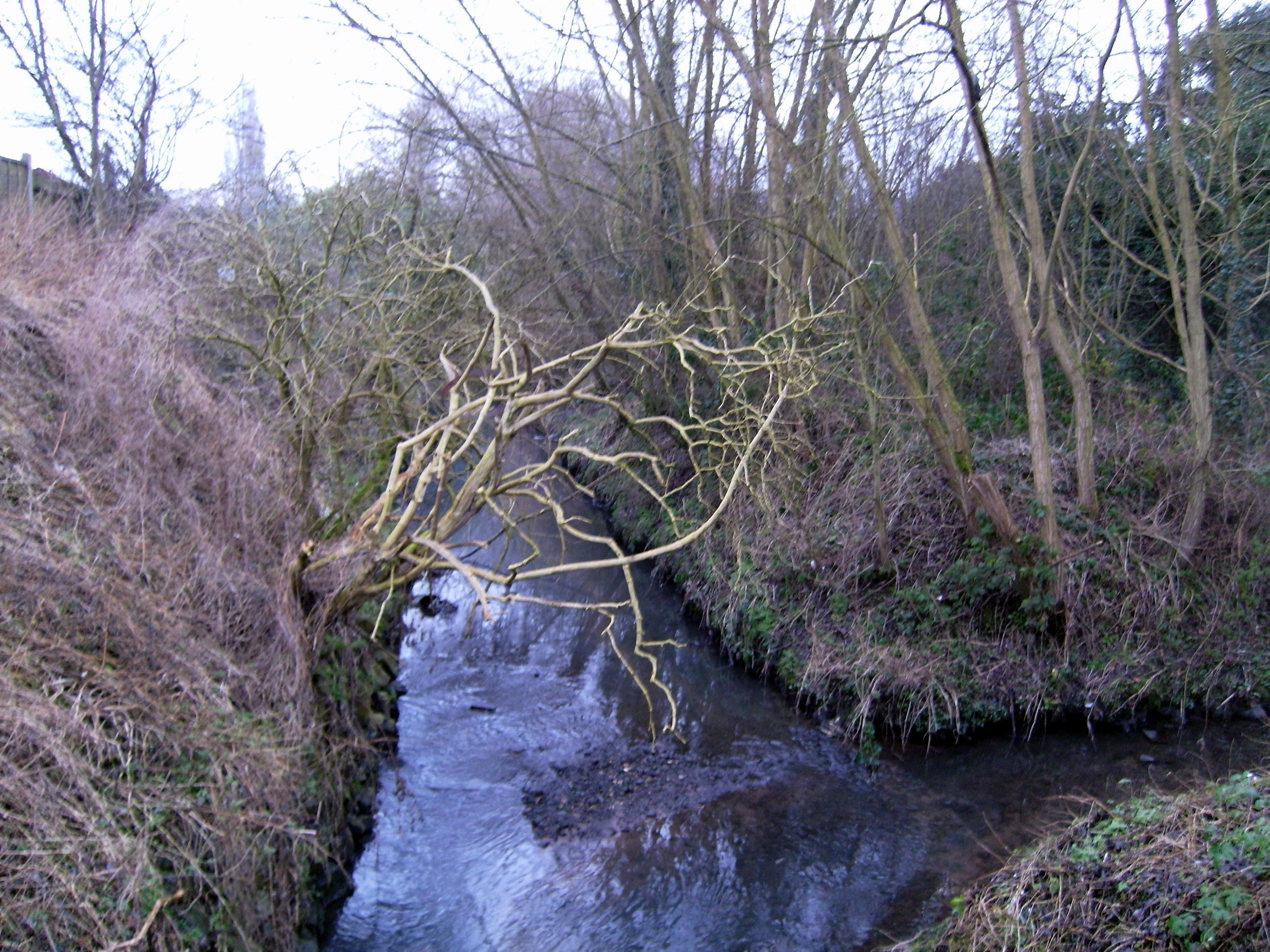
8. Confluence with Graiseley Brook in Smestow Valley Local Nature Reserve

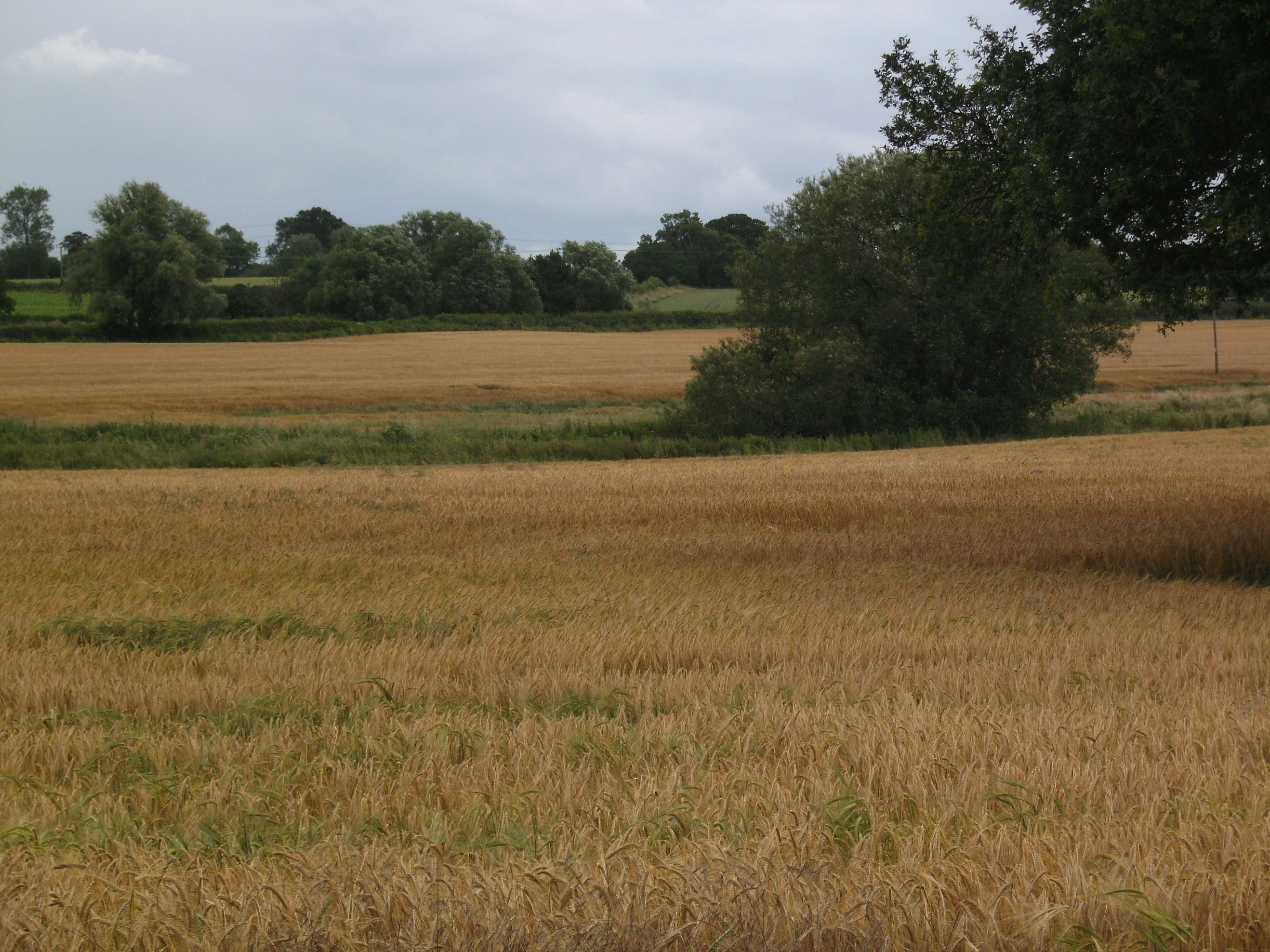
9. In farmland near Trescott

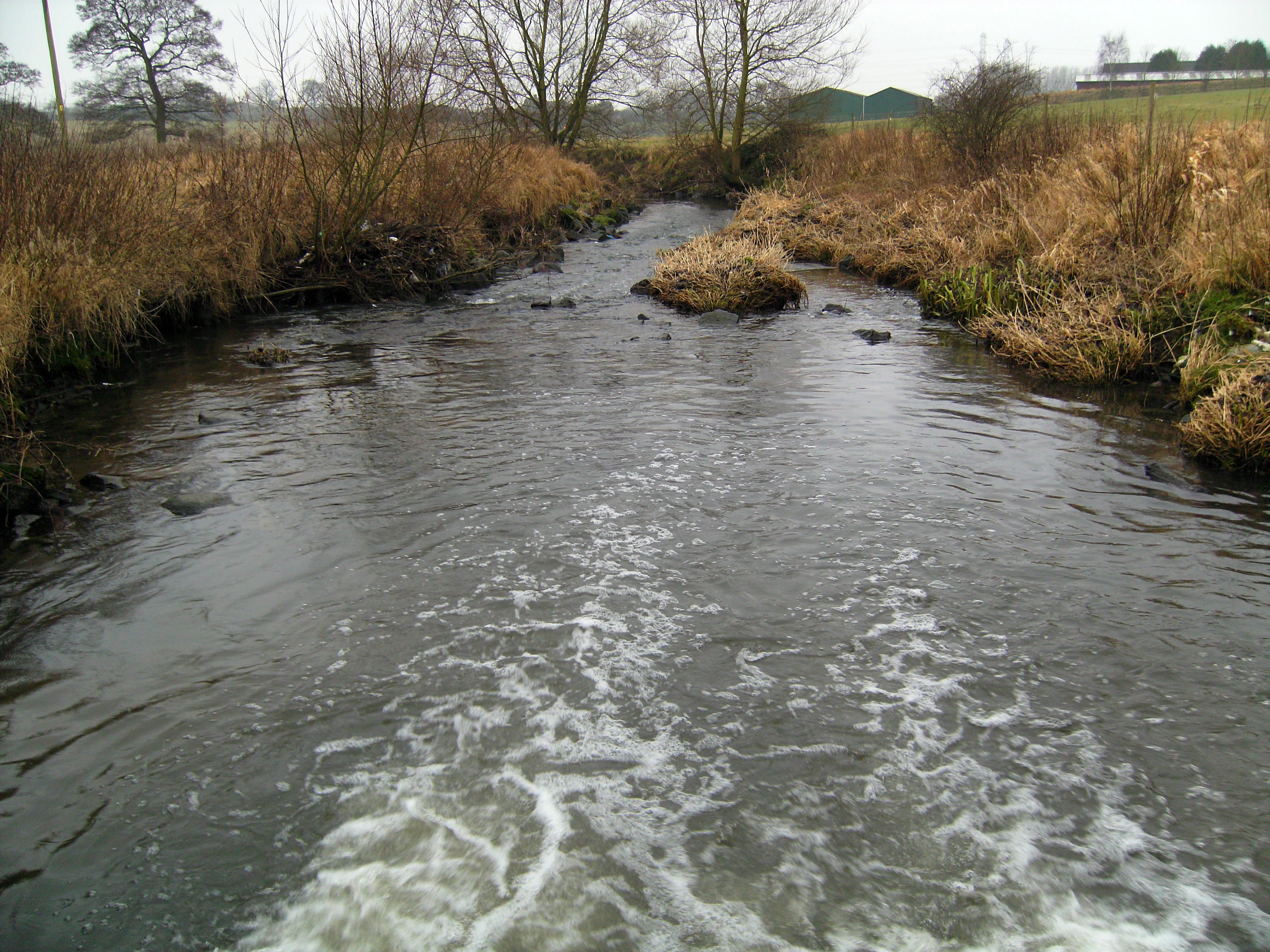
10. Trescott Ford, close to the main Wolverhampton to Bridgnorth Road

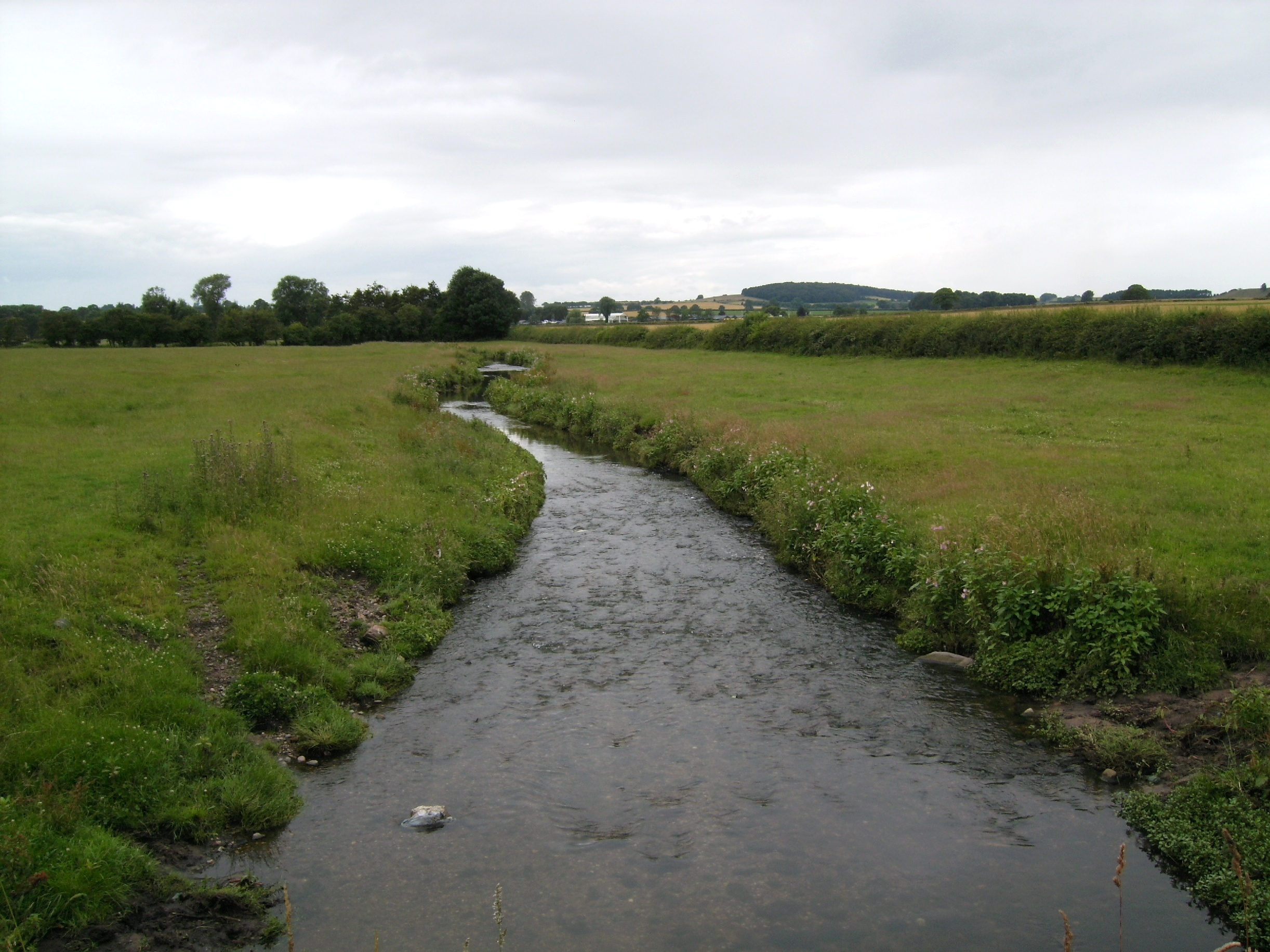
11. At Furnace Grange.

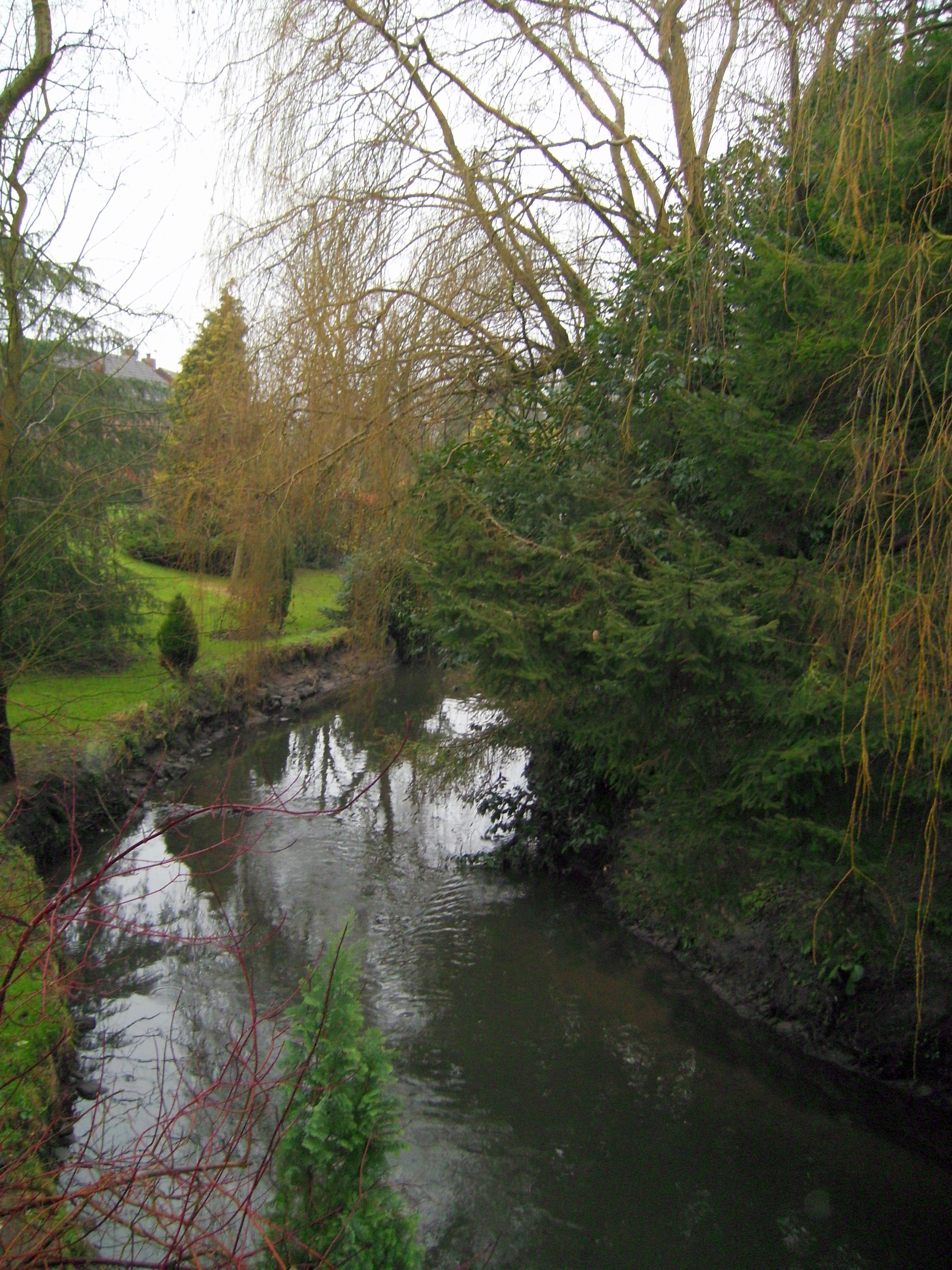
12. The Smestow at Seisdon in South Staffordshire

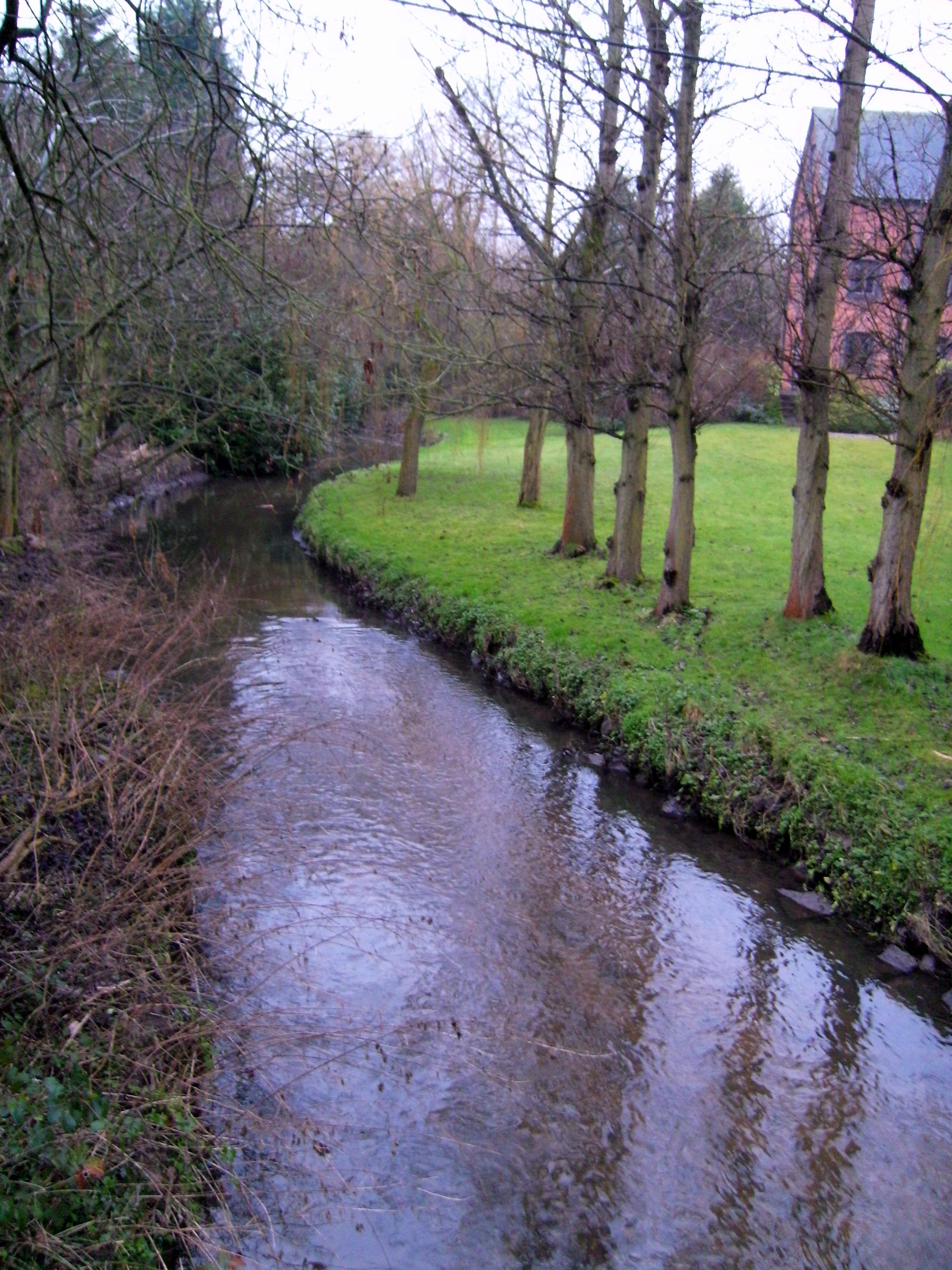
13. At Trysull in South Staffordshire

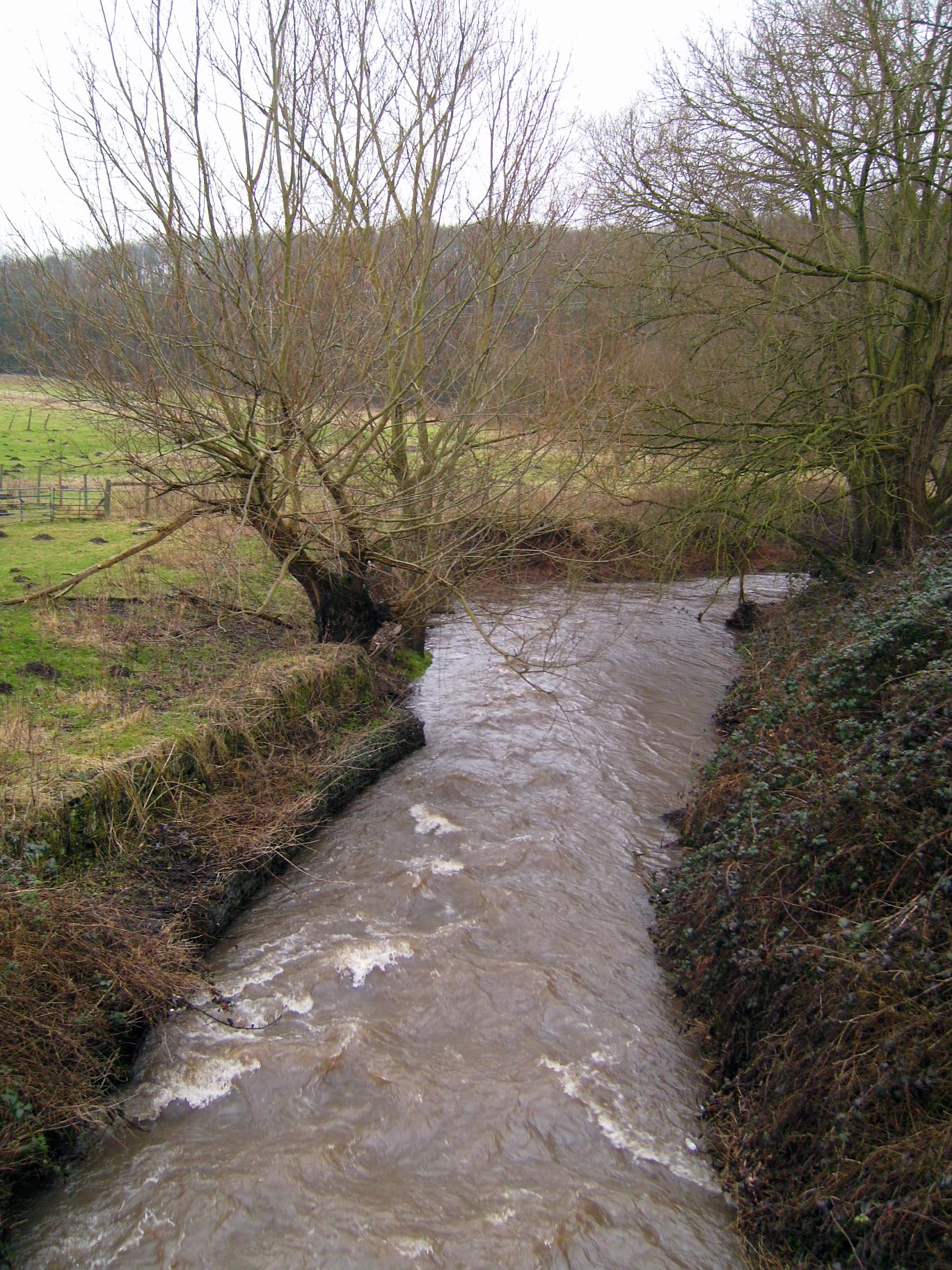
14. At Swindon

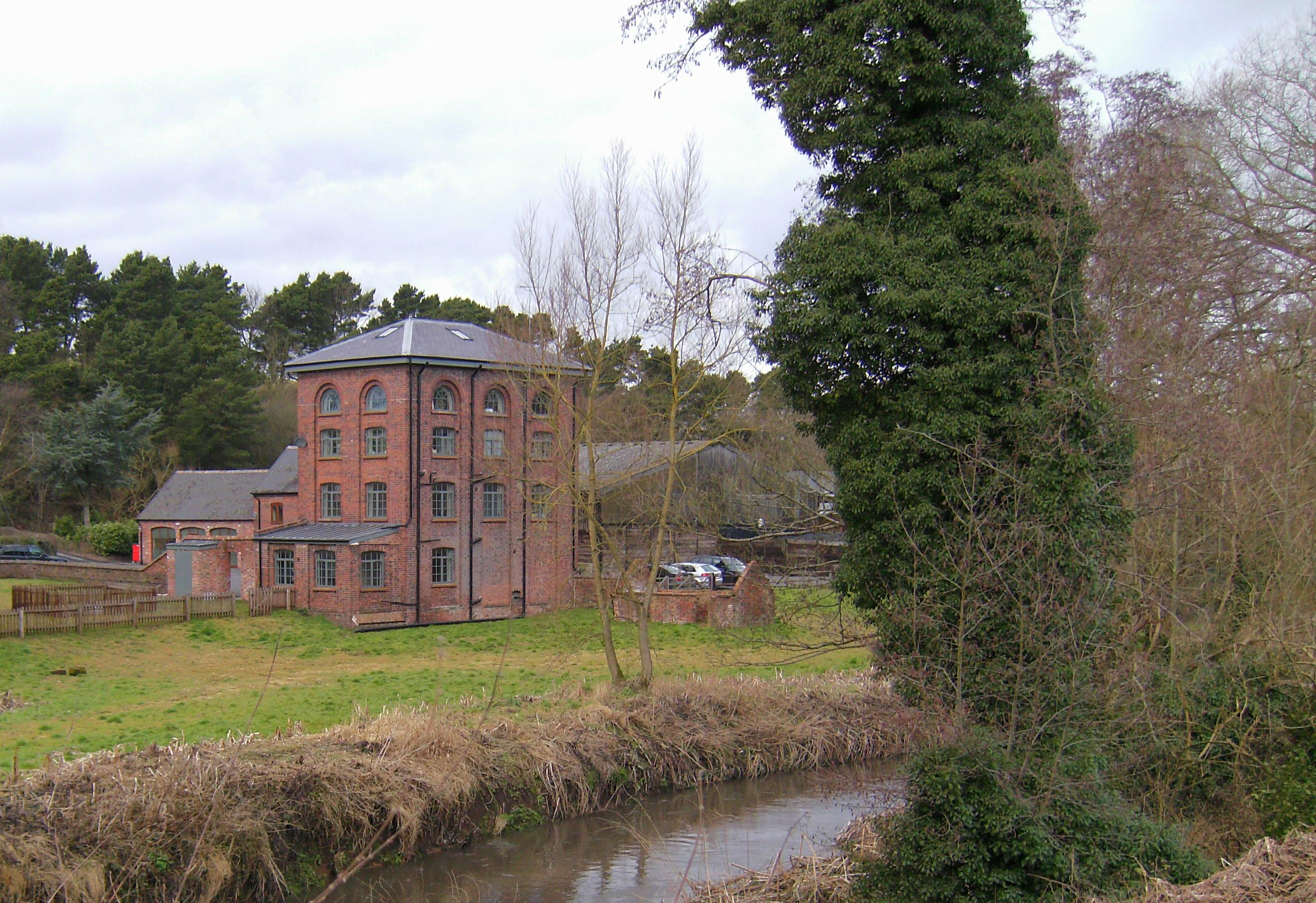
15. Greensforge Mill

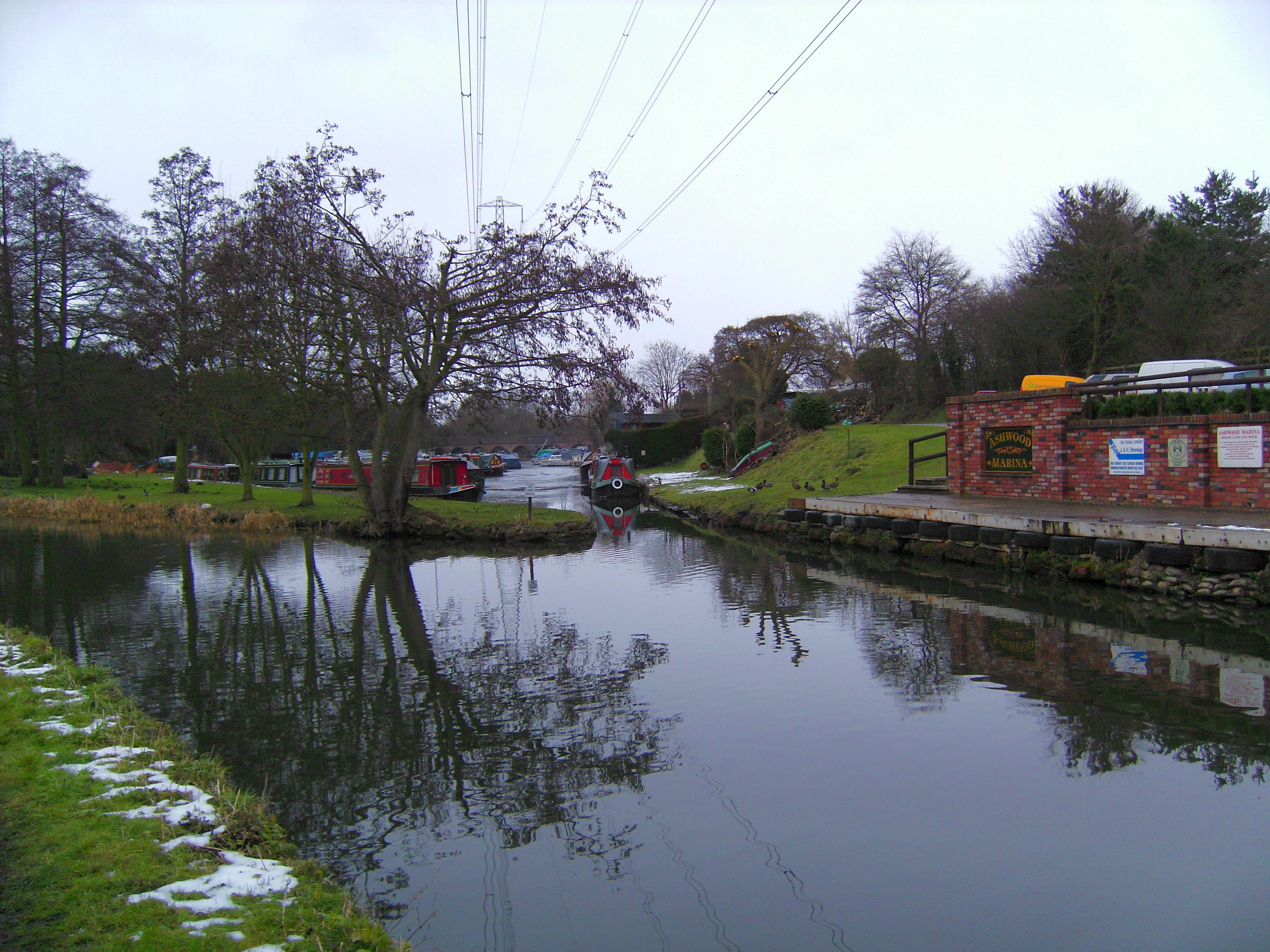
16. Marina in the canal basin at Ashwood, Staffordshire, where the Dawley Brook enters the Smestow

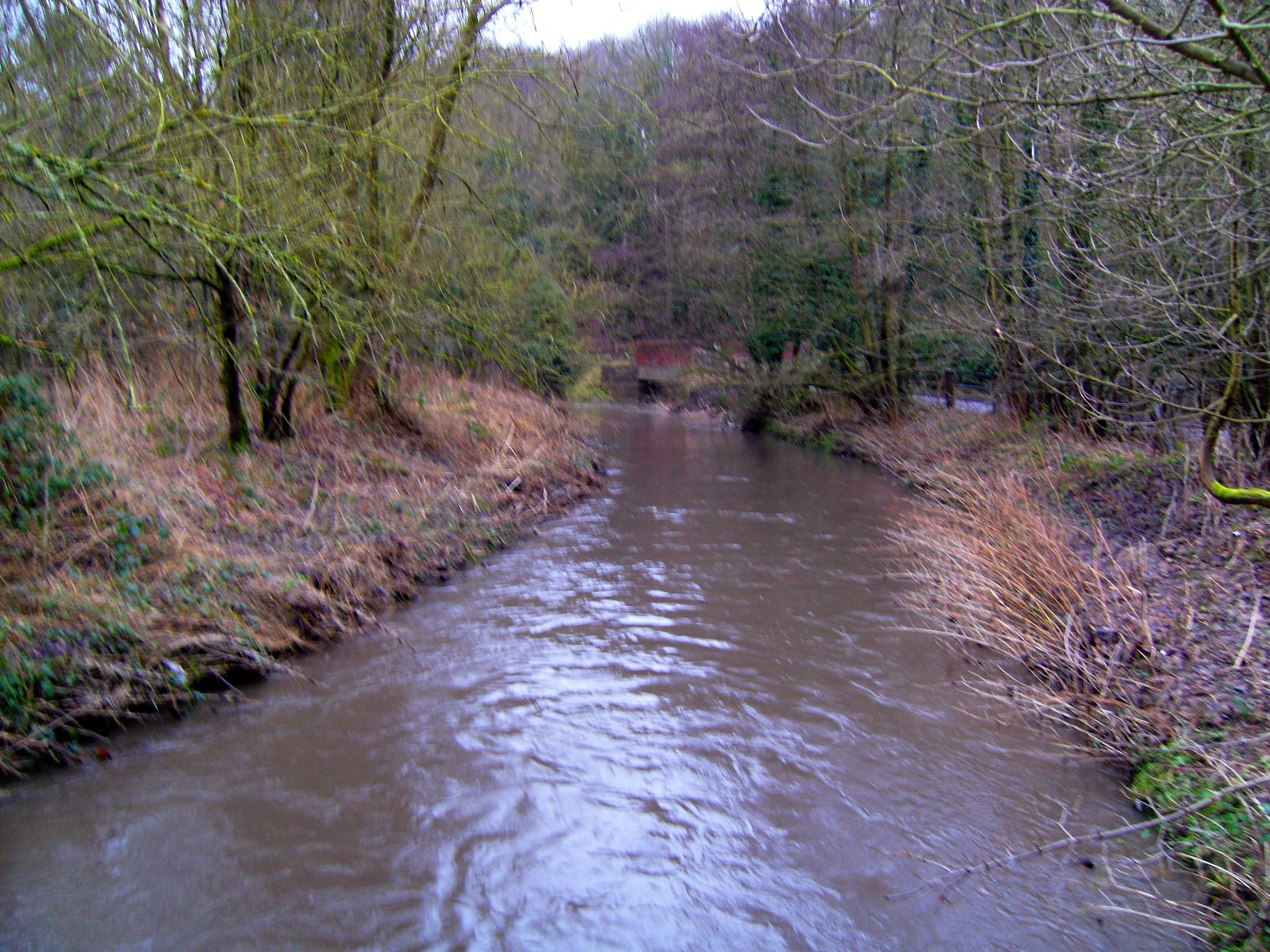
17. At Gothersley, close to its confluence with the Spittle Brook

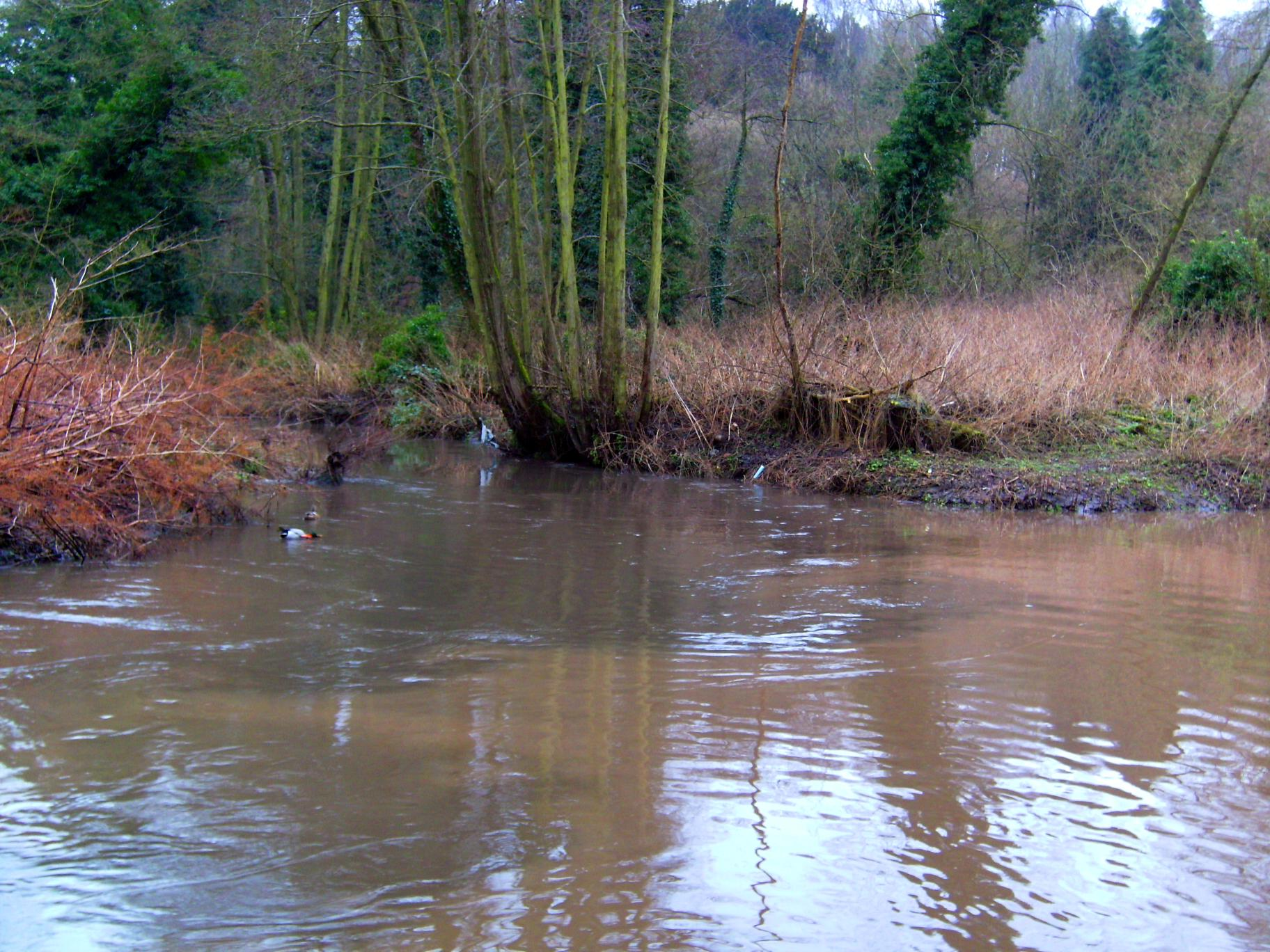
18. Confluence with the Stour

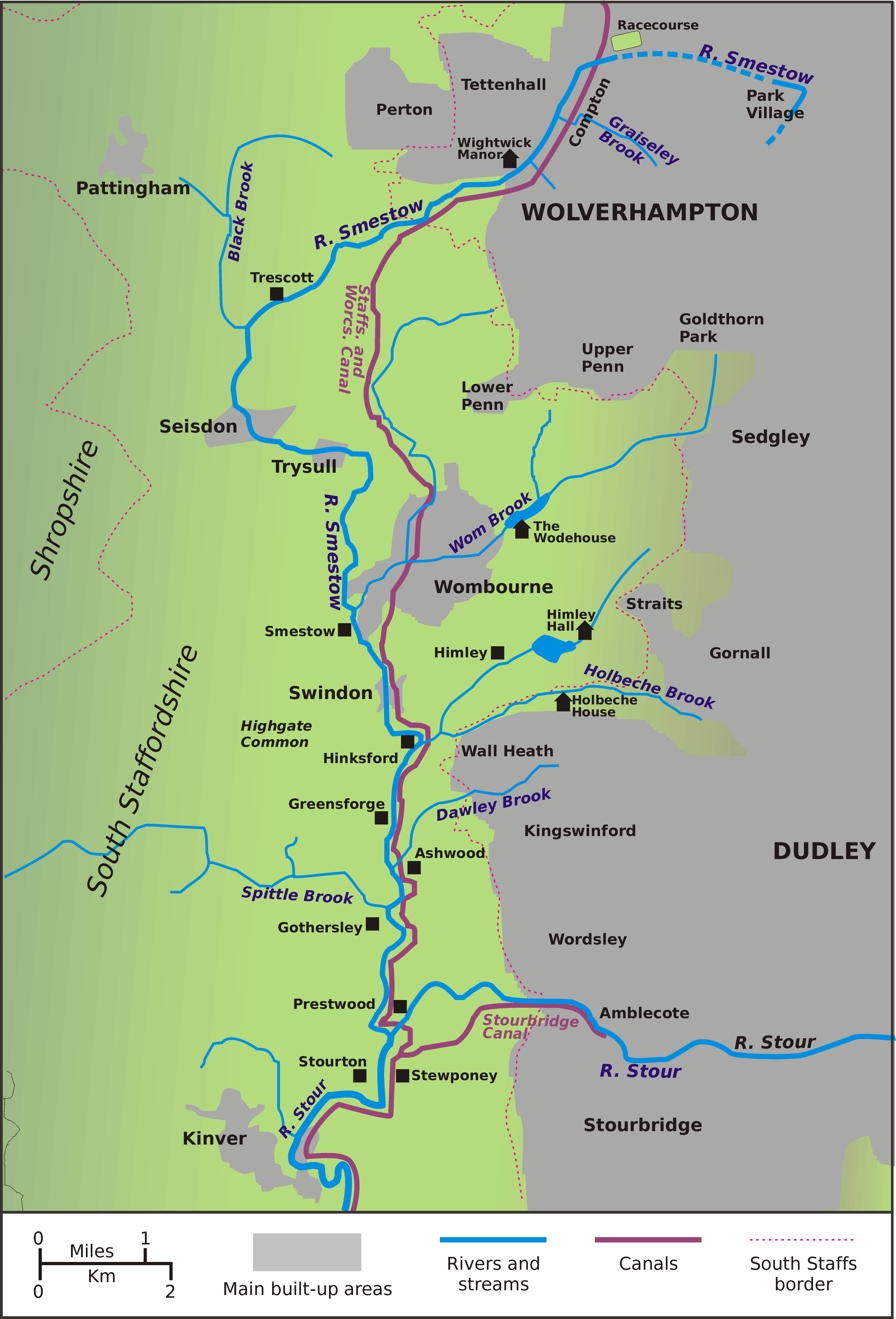
Sketch map of the course of the Smestow

1. The Smestow Brook has its source in the Springfield area, to the north-east of Wolverhampton city centre, in which many of the street names attest to the plentiful supplies of water originally found there. However, the natural springs were contained and culverted as building began here in the 1870s, with large quantities diverted to the Springfield Brewery. Note the street name and the disused brewery, since finally demolished, in the background of the photograph.
2. Today there is no sign of the Smestow for several hundred metres from its putative source in Springfield. It emerges further north, in the Park Village area, at the edge of Fowler's Park.
3. The Smestow flows northwards through the park, supplying water for a pool.
4. The Smestow then turns sharply to the west and disappears into a culvert, which takes it under the major roads and railway lines to the north of Wolverhampton, as well as under the BCN Main Line canal.
5. It emerges by Wolverhampton Racecourse at Dunstall, where a small lake provides both flood relief and a wildlife haven. It is then taken over the Staffordshire and Worcestershire Canal by an aqueduct, the Dunstall Water Bridge.
6. The aqueduct was provided by James Brindley to maintain the flow of water in the Smestow and the Stour, both important sources of power to 18th century industry. The Smestow then descends to the level of the canal.
7. The Smestow runs down the length of the Smestow Valley Local Nature Reserve, under the main Wolverhampton – Tettenhall road, and past Tettenhall Station, formerly on the Wombourne Branch Line but now a small café.
8. Here the valley is hemmed in on both sides by steep slopes. The brook flows between the Wolverhampton suburbs of Compton and Tettenhall, being joined by the Graiseley Brook and the Finchfield Brook, which drain areas to the south-west of Wolverhampton city centre. It passes through Wightwick, where it is overlooked by Wightwick Manor.
9. At Wightwick the brook begins to diverge for some kilometres from the route of the canal, just south of the main Wolverhampton to Bridgnorth road. Although mainly inaccessible to the public, the green trail of the river is easily visible for some distance as it snakes across open farmland.
10. The innocent looking Trescott Ford is notorious for catching unwary motorists after heavy local downpours.
11. Passing through the hamlet of Furnace Grange, the Smestow takes a turn southward as it is joined from the right by the Black Brook, a considerable tributary.
12. The brook swings south-east through the village of Seisdon, where it flows between properties, bordering their gardens.
13. The same is true at Trysull. It then turns definitively south, grazing the south-western edge of Wombourne, where it used to cause major flooding problems until its course was reshaped in the 1990s. Here it is joined by its most important tributary, the Wom Brook. From this point the Smestow again runs within a few hundred metres of the Staffordshire and Worcestershire Canal.
14. Passing the hamlet of Smestow it runs to Swindon, from where it shadows the canal very closely, sometimes separated from it only by the width of the towpath. Here the reinforcement of the banks (to prevent collapse during flooding) is very evident.
15. The meandering course crosses open farmland but is mostly screened from it by linear woodland. At Greensforge it passes a former Victorian corn mill, marking the site of one of the most important forges of earlier centuries, but now converted to apartments.
16. The valley narrows considerably between steep sandstone ridges after the river passes through Ashwood. The marina at Ashwood coincides with the descent of the Dawley Brook to join the Smestow. This confluence provided Roman soldiers with a natural moat to protect one of the forts, which are generally named after Greensforge.
17. At Gothersley, just south of Ashwood, the Spittle Brook joins from the right. Here the two streams water a small but valuable area of wetland.
18. Finally, at Prestwood, close to Stourton and Kinver, the Smestow enters the Stour. After rain, the darker material from upstream shows up very clearly as it flows into the sandy Stour. The Stour swings south, taking the Smestow's course, to join the River Severn at Stourport-on-Severn: its waters ultimately discharge into the Atlantic Ocean via the Bristol Channel.

== Navigability ==
The Smestow is entirely non-navigable. However, its valley forms a natural north-south route of such importance that the Staffordshire and Worcestershire Canal was constructed as a substitute for a navigable river, the Smestow supplying it with water.

== Natural history ==
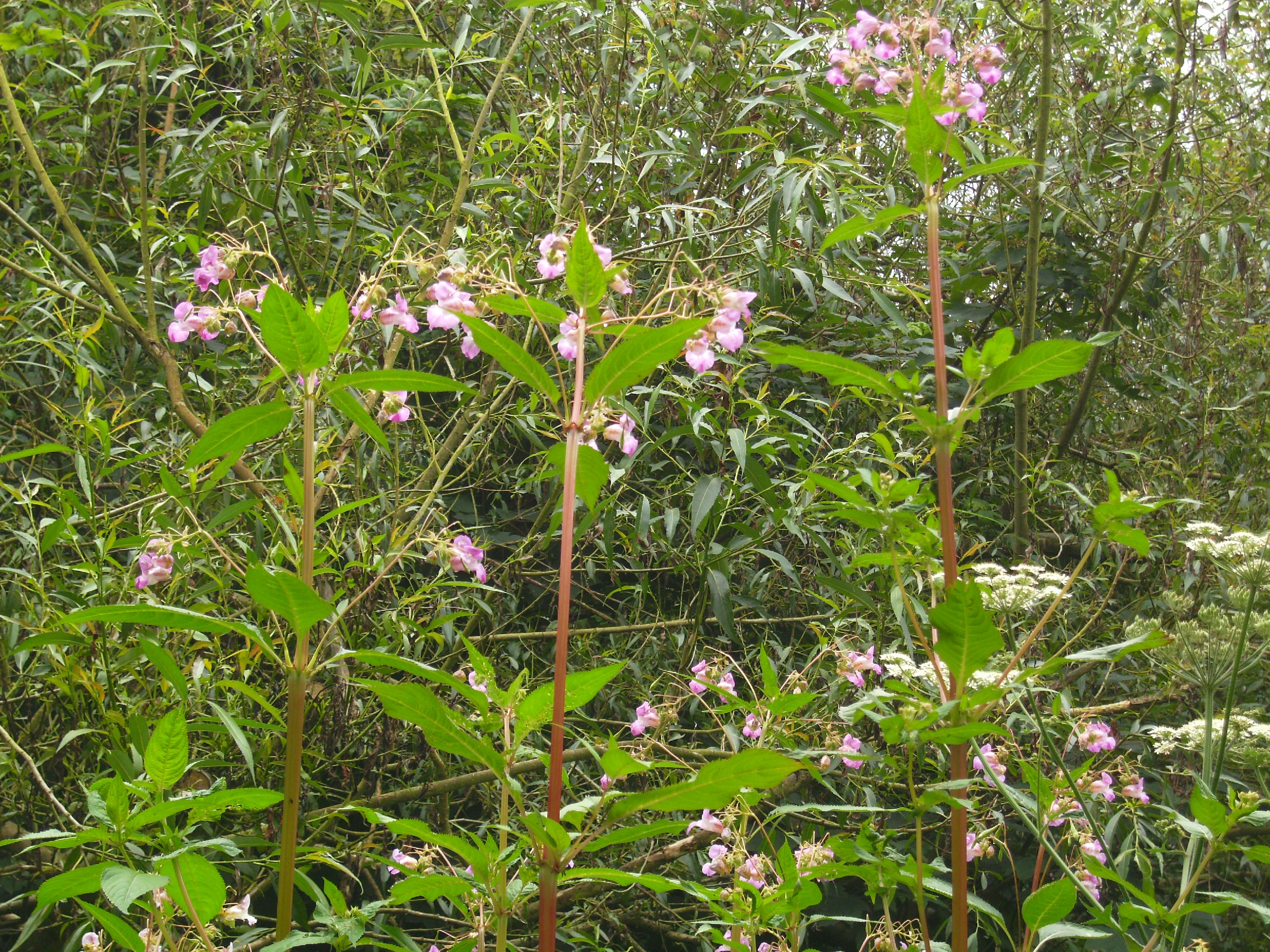
Himalayan balsam growing against a background of willows, on the bank of the Smestow near Tettenhall Station. This is sometimes considered an invasive plant.

The Smestow flows through an important local nature reserve at Wolverhampton, and its lower course largely follows the conservation area associated with the canal, often through linear woodland, as well as small areas of wetland. Hence, it is home to a wide range of wildlife: if little is rare, the variety is great. Dredging and other works often disturb wildlife, but recolonisation is usually rapid. The reduction in pollution over the last three decades has allowed wildlife to diversify and flourish.

The Smestow Valley reserve claims no less than 170 species of bird as residents or visitors, with 55 species breeding locally. Winter sees the greatest variety with the regular blackbird and common chaffinch reinforced by visitors, like redwing, fieldfare, lesser redpoll, siskin, little grebe, common snipe, lapwing and golden plover. Raptors like the buzzard and sparrowhawk also hover.

Insect life is also rich and varied, with more than 20 kinds of butterfly seen on the reserve, including ringlet, common blue, holly blue, peacock, red admiral, painted lady, green-veined white, comma, gatekeeper, small skipper, large skipper, meadow brown, purple hairstreak, small heath and small copper and, rarely, brimstone and clouded yellow. There is also a great variety of damselflies and dragonflies.

== Geology ==
The Smestow took its present shape as a result of the last Ice Age. Glacial action removed part of the low ridge, to the north of present-day Wolverhampton, which separates the River Trent and River Severn catchments, creating the Aldersley Gap. As a result, the Smestow was able to break through to the south, and was thus captured from the Trent by the Severn catchment.

In some areas, especially around Wolverhampton, the Smestow runs over beds of gravels, laid down in the last Ice Age. For a large part of its course, however, the Smestow flows over deep Bunter deposits of sandstone, also known as Triassic Sherwood sandstone – similar to the deposits underlying Sherwood Forest in Nottinghamshire and Cannock Chase in Staffordshire. These are highly permeable, allowing the land above to drain quickly and reducing the flow within river courses. As a result, the areas of South Staffordshire around the river, despite fairly high rainfall, had a natural vegetation of heath and open birch woodland. This was modified progressively after the Anglo-Saxon settlement, with a gradual clearance of farmland. With the emergence of modern, high input farming, from the 18th century onwards, the aquifer became increasingly vulnerable to nitrate pollution. The relative decline of heavy industry in the region makes this the main, and growing, pollution threat to water supplies in the Smestow valley.

== History and economic importance ==
The Smestow runs very close to a number of Roman sites, the most important being at Greensforge, where two camps were successively situated, one apparently using the stream as part of its fortifications. However, it was the Anglo-Saxon settlement that brought significant permanent human habitation to the valley, and it is probably from these settlers that the stream took its name.

=== Industry ===
The banks of the Smestow and Stour were home to a thriving iron industry, based on locally produced charcoal, from the Middle Ages until the 18th century. This included many forges but also, from the mid-17th century, some fairly large enterprises run by wealthy businessmen, like those at the Grange Furnace, near Trescott, Heath Forge near Wombourne, Swindon, Greensforge, and Gothersley. To power the Heath Mill, a substantial leat was constructed to divert water from the Smestow at Trysull into a mill pond above the little valley of the Wom Brook, whence it dropped into the brook, powering a series of mills, and then flowed back into the Smestow. Key names connected with these developments were the Foley family and the Dud Dudley, an illegitimate son of Edward Sutton, 5th Baron Dudley. Dudley carried out early experiments, using coal products to substitute for charcoal in iron production. The Dudley family had large works at Cradley, but Dud Dudley claimed his process was used at an iron works at Swindon. His father (also an ironmaster) lived at Himley Hall on a tributary of the Smestow, near which he had a blast furnace.

In the late 18th century, the spread of coke-fired blast furnaces in Shropshire and the Black Country brought charcoal-fired iron production gradually to an end. Heath Forge became a corn mill in the 1810s, while Swindon Forge was modernised in the mid-19th century. Water-power for the continuing industrial activity was so important that James Brindley was prevented from cutting off the flow of the upper Smestow when the Staffordshire and Worcestershire Canal was developed, around 1770. Instead he was forced to preserve the flow with a "water bridge" or aqueduct at Dunstall, in the Aldersley Gap, which carries the brook over the canal and releases it to descend to its natural course.

The canal itself allowed coal, coke and iron to be transported more easily, allowing industrialists to combine water and steam power, alongside coke-fired blast furnaces, wherever the river and canal ran close together. The result was the development of larger iron-works at Swindon and Gothersley on the Smestow, as well as nearby at the Hyde, near Kinver on the Stour – all situated between river and canal. The Swindon works included a rolling mill and generated power mainly from coal, although its drop hammer was driven by a large water wheel. It was to last until 1976.

Although iron production was thus centralised, the small-scale, decentralised working of iron not only continued but increased. An 1817 commentator tells us that Swindon has "an iron-works, some forges, and a blade-mill, where by a peculiar temperament of the iron, it is formed into scythes, sickles, axes, &c." A survey of 1834 adds corn mills to the list of enterprises at Swindon. It also tells us that Wombourne is a large village, "occupied chiefly by nailors, who work for the neighbouring manufacturers". The nail-makers were thus mainly self-employed contractors, working in their own small forges on iron brought in from the large producers. The demand for water to power the forges continued and even rose well into the Victorian period, during which the Smestow powered at least 30 mills. In some cases, as at Greensforge and Heath, iron-working gave way ultimately to corn milling.

=== Water supply ===
Meanwhile, the industries of north Wolverhampton continued to use the water of the Smestow for a range of purposes, not least to carry away effluent. From the 1870s water was extracted in large quantities at the source for the brewing industry. The large Springfield Brewery that was built for William Butler at the source of the Smestow in 1873 was to operate until 1991, for much of its life in the hands of Mitchells & Butlers.

The main reason that the brook itself often appears scant in flow and unimportant is that the rock beneath is highly-permeable sandstone. Hence, very large quantities of water can be locked away not far below the surface, in the underlying aquifer. As early as 1851, the engineer Henry Marten gauged the supply at ten million gallons (approximately 45,000,000 litres) per day and proposed to extract water for drinking and industrial use from the Smestow. This was blocked by opposition from the carpet makers of Kidderminster, who feared that extraction from the Smestow would affect the flow of the Stour, which they used to carry away their effluent.

The following year, Marten put forward a scheme for drinking water extraction from the lower Smestow. This time he sent water samples to analytical laboratories in London, where they were pronounced exceptionally clear and free from decaying matter. The aquifer beneath the sandstone is itself very vulnerable to pollution, and the actual river water at that time is unlikely to have been free of chemical and microbial pollution. Perhaps it is a good thing that Marten's idea was not put into practice until the 1890s, when a large pumping station was constructed at Ashwood, south of Swindon, to supply water to Black Country industry. This was soon followed by the Bratch pumping station at Wombourne, built to supply Bilston with drinking water. Both of these extracted water from the aquifer, not directly from the river, and were actually sited closer to the canal, which could be used to supply them with coal.

In the 20th century attempts were made to clean up the Smestow. These, together with the almost total collapse of heavy industry in Wolverhampton and the Black Country during the 1980s, have allowed the river to recover from earlier pollution. Today the water is clear and the courses of the river and the canal are important wildlife havens.

== Tributaries ==
The Smestow is enlarged by water from a number of tributaries. Travelling upstream from the Stour confluence, they include:

- The Spittle Brook, which drains the area north of Enville, almost as far as Six Ashes, on the lip of the Severn valley, and flows down through a boggy area to join the Smestow near Gothersley.
- The Dawley Brook, which drains the Kingswinford area and fills the Ashwood basin or marina, before joining the Smestow.
- The Holbeche Brook, which begins near Gornalwood and flows past Holbeche House to join the Smestow at Hinksford.
- The Wom Brook, which drains an area as far afield as Penn Common and Sedgley, flows through Wombourne via the great pool at the Wodehouse, and joins the Smestow south of the village
- The Black Brook, which drains the area almost up to Perton and Pattingham, and joins the Smestow near Trescott.
- The Perton Brook, which tumbles down Wightwick Bank and waters the gardens of Wightwick Manor.
- The Finchfield and Graiseley Brooks, which drain the west of Wolverhampton, and join the Smestow in the Smestow Valley Local Nature Reserve.

== Settlements ==
The Smestow flows through or past a number of settlements – many associated with the historic iron industry, or with the canal.

In South Staffordshire, travelling upstream from the Stour confluence:

- Ashwood
- Greensforge
- Swindon
- Smestow village
- Wombourne
- Trysull
- Seisdon
- Trescott

In Wolverhampton:

- Wightwick
- Finchfield
- Tettenhall
- Compton
- Aldersley
- Dunstall Hill
- Park Village

== Features ==
Point	Coordinates (links to map & photo sources)
Source in Springfield, Wolverhampton	52°35′32″N 2°07′11″W
Emergence in Fowler's Park, Park Village	52°35′50″N 2°07′06″W
Wolverhampton Racecourse	52°36′10″N 2°08′53″W
Dunstall Water Bridge	52°36′12″N 2°09′05″W
Smestow Valley Local Nature Reserve (entrance)	52°35′48″N 2°09′43″W
Wightwick Manor	52°35′01″N 2°11′39″W
South Staffordshire Railway Walk Local Nature Reserve	52°34′26″N 2°11′18″W
Trescott Ford	52°34′22″N 2°13′11″W
Confluence with Black Brook	52°33′39″N 2°14′17″W
Confluence with Wom Brook	52°31′32″N 2°12′50″W
Highgate Common Country Park	52°30′29″N 2°14′00″W
Confluence with River Stour	52°28′03″N 2°12′10″W
