= Iverley =

Coordinates: 52.431°N 2.173°W

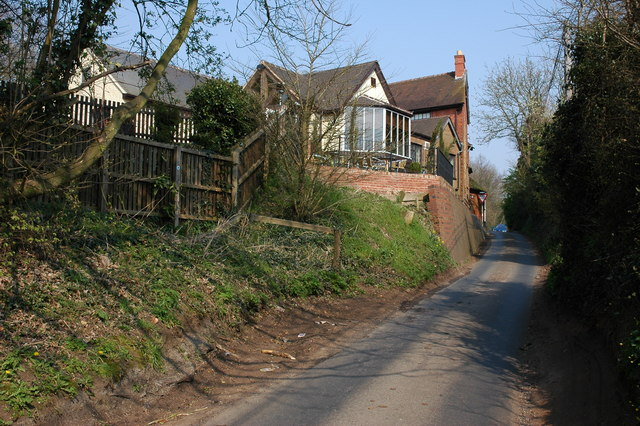
- The Crown
- District: South Staffordshire
- Shire county: Staffordshire
- Region: West Midlands
- Country: England
- Sovereign state: United Kingdom
- Post town: STOURBRIDGE
- Postcode district: DY8
- Dialling code: 01562
- Police: Staffordshire
- Fire: Staffordshire
- Ambulance: West Midlands
- UK Parliament: South Staffordshire

Iverley is a very small area of the parish of Kinver in Staffordshire that has no road link to the rest of the parish. It is notable as being the most southerly point in Staffordshire.

Iverley lies in a corner of Staffordshire, with Churchill, Worcestershire to the south and Norton, Stourbridge, Pedmore, and Hagley to the east. The eastern boundary is approximately the Roman road from Droitwich to Greensforge.

== History ==
Iverley Hay was one of three hays (enclosed hunting areas) in Kinver Forest. It had 1560 trees in 1509. John Whorwood of Stourton obtained a lease from the crown in 1629, and presumably subsequently bought the freehold. It was included in Wortley Whorwood's sale of the manor of Kinver to Thomas Foley, who settled it on his son Philip Foley. Philip granted a series of 200-year leases to men who would enclose what had become heathland and build farmhouses, the final such lease of what became Sugarloaf Farm being in 1712.

Despite its proximity to Stourbridge, Iverley remains an extremely rural area, where very little development has taken place. The area includes Stourbridge Tennis and Squash Club on Sugarloaf Lane.
