= John Clarkson Major =

- Born: John Clarkson Major; 22 March 1826; Flamborough, East Riding of Yorkshire, England
- Died: 21 December 1895 (aged 69); Lower Penn, Staffordshire, England
- Occupation: Manufacturing chemist
- Known for: Mayor of Wolverhampton, public water supply & drainage provision

John Clarkson Major (22 March 1826 – 21 December 1895) was a successful manufacturing chemist who, with his partner E. L. Turner, set up the first tar distillery in Wolverhampton, Major & Company Ltd. He served as Mayor of Wolverhampton 1873/74.

== Major & Company Ltd. ==
Exploiting German tar distilling technology Major & Company Ltd. manufactured a range of products from tar supplied as a by-product of the town gas works. As they expanded they improved their refining to generate larger profits from higher-end products. The business grew into a nationwide operation with several depots. After Major died in 1895 his son continued manufacturing. In 1921 they joined Midland Tar Distillers and in several guises the company was still operating in 1969 when finally taken over by the Burmah Castrol Group.

== Politics ==
Major was elected to the town council and as chairman of the Health Committees was the instigator of provision of a clean public water supply and town centre drainage. He served as the twenty-seventh Mayor of Wolverhampton in 1873/74.

== Personal life ==
John Clarkson Major was born on 22 March 1826 in Flamborough, East Riding of Yorkshire, England, the son of John Major and Elizabeth. Major married Elizabeth Jones of Chester in 1859. They had one child, a son John Lewis Major (1861–1945), who took over running his father's company. He died at home at The Bhyll (later Bellencroft), Lower Penn, Staffordshire on 21 December 1895

Political offices
Preceded by William Edwards	Mayor of Wolverhampton; 1873–1874	Succeeded by Samuel Dickinson
