= Baby Ballroom =

English dance competition reality television series

- Genre: Dance reality TV
- Starring: Kim Hillyard; Jane Bullock; Warren Bullock
- Country of origin: United Kingdom
- Original language: English
- No. of seasons: 2
- No. of episodes: 15

Production
- Running time: 60 min.
- Production companies: Firecracker Films; 5Star

Original release
- Network: Channel 5
- Release: April 27, 2017

Baby Ballroom is an English-language dance reality-TV series about a dance school, the Zig Zag Dance Factory in Wolverhampton, England. The school is run by Warren Bullock and his wife Jane, former ballroom dance champions, and the show focuses on the many couples that Warren and Jane train.

== Cast ==
- Kim Hillyard
- Jane Bullock
- Warren Bullock

== Release ==
It was released on April 27, 2017 on Netflix streaming.
