= Warren Bullock =

British dancer

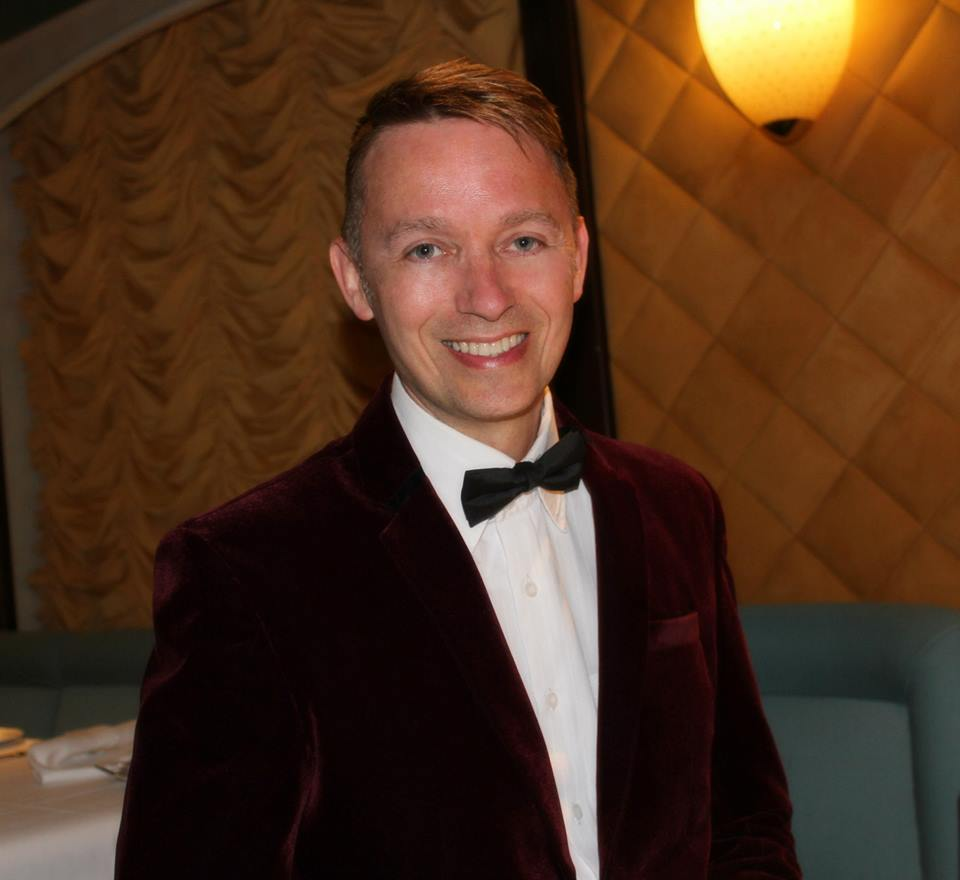
- Warren Bullock in 2015
- Born: Warren James Bullock; 12 January 1965 (age 61); Stoke-on-Trent, Staffordshire, England
- Occupation: Professional dancer
- Spouse: Jane Phillips

Warren James Bullock (born 12 January 1965) is an English professional ballroom dancer and dance teacher, most widely known for the TV series Baby Ballroom and as the founder of Zig Zag Dance Factory in Lower Penn, Wolverhampton.

== Career ==
=== Competitive dancing and early teaching ===
Bullock and his wife Jane reached high levels of success in competitive dancing, including becoming British Champions in ballroom dancing. The couple were also featured on the TV series Come Dancing from 1988 to 1994, as well as a variety of other roles throughout film and television. Bullock retired from competitive dancing in 1997 to focus on teaching.

From the 90s to the mid-2010s, Bullock became known for teaching Latin and ballroom dancing onboard cruise ships.

=== Zig Zag Dance Factory ===
In 1994, Warren and his wife Jane started Zig Zag Dance Factory, a Latin and ballroom dance school. This was started initially as a way of earning an income to continue competing. The school is located in Lower Penn, Wolverhampton, and has notably trained with a wide number of professional dancers on Strictly Come Dancing. Since 2014, Bullock has hosted an annual awards event; The Galaxy Classique awards.

Together with his wife Jane, Bullock taught Ballroom and Latin American dancing in schools (including King Edward VI High School for Girls in Edgbaston) and Glebefields Primary School in Tipton where they pioneered the teaching of ballroom dancing in schools, before launching the concept to the Ballroom Dancers Federation which initiated dance being included into the curriculum.

=== Baby Ballroom ===
Bullock and Zig Zag Dance Factory became internationally known with the TV series Baby Ballroom, which showcased the school's training of younger children and the world of children's competitive Latin and ballroom dancing. Baby Ballroom ran for 2 seasons and a Christmas special from 2017 on the British TV channel 5star, as well as through the online streaming service Netflix.

== Personal life ==
Warren James Bullock was born on 12 January 1965 in Stoke-on-Trent, Staffordshire to Maurice Bullock and Jean Bullock (née Beaumont), owners of a local pub.

At the age of 19, he met his last partner (and now wife) Jane (née Phillips) at a studio in Birmingham run by competitive coaches Robin Short and Rita Last, who introduced them. Still financed by his parents, Bullock had a string of jobs; of note was work as an airbrush artist.

Warren married Jane Phillips, his professional dancing partner, in 1995. He lives in Lower Penn, Wolverhampton with Jane and their triplet children, born 29 February 2000.

=== Child sexual charges ===
On 18 September 2026, Staffordshire Police issued a statement on their website that Warren Bullock was charged with causing or inciting a boy aged 13 to 15 to engage in sexual activity and sexual assault on a male.

== Philanthropy and community work ==
Warren Bullock supports and raises money for Starlight Children's Foundation. Through his Zig Zag Dance school, in 2019 Warren created "Strictly Ability" the first open competition for children with disabilities.

Bullock created and organised the Global Internet Dance Championships to unite dancers from around the world during the coronavirus pandemic.

== Awards and achievements ==
Warren Bullock and his wife Jane have received two Carl Alan Awards in both amateur dancing and professional teaching. The first Carl Alan Award was in 1993 for Amateur Ballroom, and the second was in the category of "Ballroom, Latin and Sequence Teacher" and was presented to Warren and Jane on 10 February 2009. They are winners of the Le Classique du Dance Awards 2008.

== Filmography ==
=== Film ===
Title	Year	Role	Notes
The Weather in the Streets	1983	Dancer/Actor	Danced with Joanna Lumley

=== Television ===
Title	Year	Role	Notes
Baby Ballroom (5 Star) (Netflix)	2017–2018	Himself	15 episodes
Come Dancing (BBC)	1988–1994	Professional Dancer	Approximately 20 episodes
Doctors (BBC)	2004	Extra and Dance Choreographer	1 episode
United Kingdom Dance Championships	1992–1994	Himself	3 episodes
How to Live with Women (BBC3)	2011	Himself	Episode 4: "Paul and Nisaa"
Rumba in the Jungle	1997	Himself	This is the last professional event Bullock competed in.
