= Bushbury South and Low Hill =

Electoral ward of Wolverhampton, England

Coordinates: 52.610°N 2.115°W

Bushbury South and Low Hill is a ward of Wolverhampton City Council, West Midlands, England. It is situated to the north of the city centre, bordering the Bushbury North, Fallings Park, Heath Town, St Peter's and Oxley wards, and forms part of the Wolverhampton North East constituency.

It contains the southern part of Bushbury as well as Low Hill and part of the inner city area of Park Village. Our Lady and St Chad Catholic Academy and Moreton School as well as Fallings Park primary school lie within the ward, as does the Goodyear tyre factory, which has scaled down its operations considerably in recent years.

The local pub, situated on Old Fallings Lane, was originally named "Highcroft" which changed to "The Moon Under Water" when new management was introduced. The pub's name was finally changed to "The New Highcroft", before being demolished and replaced with the Highcroft Hall Residential Care Home, a Sanctuary Group home specialising in residential and dementia care.
