= Ashwood, Staffordshire =

Coordinates: 52.49°N 02.20°W

Ashwood
- Location within Staffordshire
- OS grid reference: SO8688
- Shire county: Staffordshire
- Region: West Midlands
- Country: England
- Sovereign state: United Kingdom
- Post town: Kingswinford
- Postcode district: DY6
- Police: Staffordshire
- Fire: Staffordshire
- Ambulance: West Midlands

Ashwood is a small area of Staffordshire, England.

It is situated in the South Staffordshire district, approximately two miles west of the West Midlands conurbation and the Metropolitan Borough of Dudley. Population details for the 2011 census can be found under Kinver.

There are a small number of predominantly older scattered houses in it, as well as a marina off the Staffordshire and Worcestershire Canal. There is no nucleated village.

More built-up nearby areas include Kingswinford, Stourbridge, Kinver and Wolverhampton. The nearest public amenities are approximately one mile away in Wall Heath village.

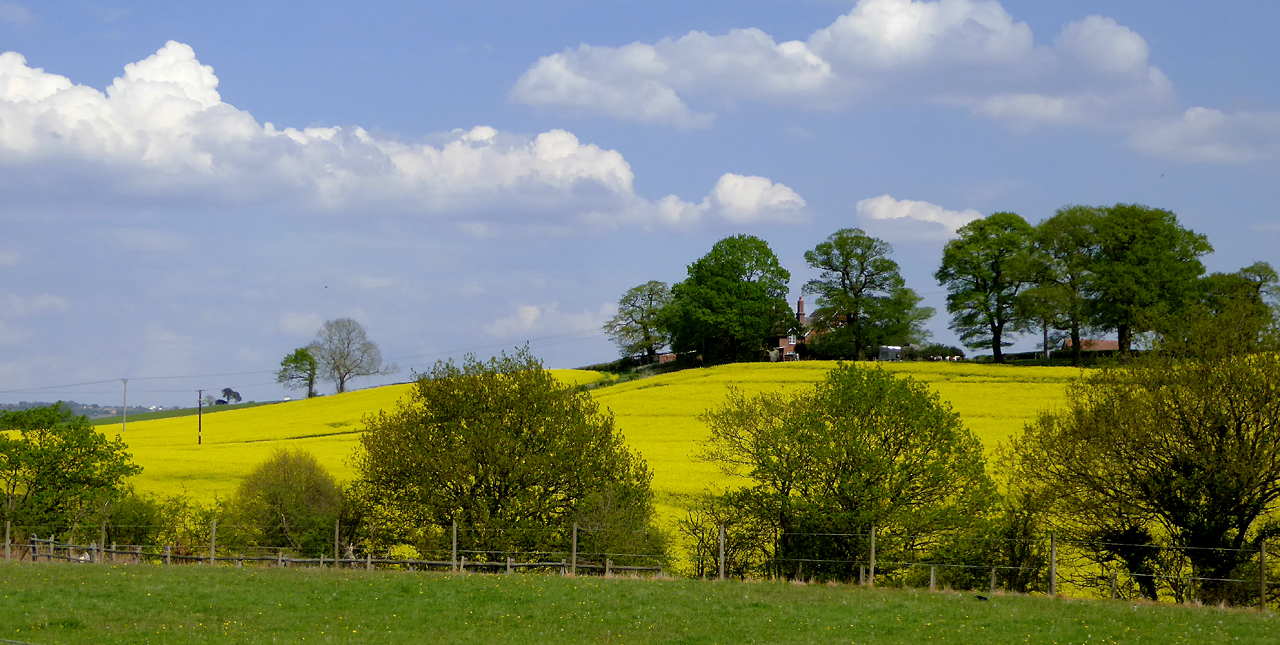
Farmland near Ashwood, Staffordshire

== History ==
Ashwood was formerly an area of medieval woodland and later heathland, bounded by the Smestow Brook, the River Stour, and cultivated lands in Kingswinford. It was one of the medieval hays (enclosures) of Kinver Forest. It was managed by a bailiff, who had a small farm at Prestwood by the service of keeping the hay. The hay stretched north to Wall Heath and east into what is now part of the built up area of Kingswinford and Wordsley.

Domesday Book records it as the manor of Haswic, which was waste on account of the forest. Previously there had been a village in a manor belonging to the priests of Wolverhampton. This may in turn have succeeded a Roman settlement, occupying the site of Greensforge Roman fort.

The heath was inclosed mainly as three open fields in the 1680s, on the basis of long leases granted to the commoners, and again by Act of Parliament (Parliamentary inclosure) when the leases expired in the 1780s. The whole of Ashwood was then part of Kingswinford parish, but the rural part of it was transferred to Kinver parish in the 1930s, when the rest of Kingswinford was transferred to Brierley Hill Urban District.

The marina occupies the site of Flatheridge pool. It was made as a canal basin, where coal brought down a railway from Pensnett could be loaded into canal barges.
