= Bushbury North =

Electoral ward of Wolverhampton, England

Coordinates: 52.624°N 2.116°W

Bushbury North is a ward of Wolverhampton City Council, West Midlands, England. It is situated to the north of the city centre, on the city's border with South Staffordshire.

As well as South Staffordshire, Bushbury North borders the Fallings Park, Bushbury South and Low Hill and Oxley wards, and forms part of the Wolverhampton North East constituency. It contains the northern part of Bushbury as well as Fordhouses.

The National Trust property of Moseley Old Hall is nearby, over the border in Staffordshire, but can only be reached from Bushbury North. Its address is in Fordhouses.

Northicote School was situated in the ward. Opened in 1951 as a secondary modern school, it was briefly in the national spotlight in the late 1990s when its headteacher Geoff Hampton became the first of a Comprehensive school to receive a knighthood for overseeing an upturn in exam results and a vastly improving rating from inspectors. In September 2010, it merged with the former Pendeford High School to form North East Wolverhampton Academy, which operated from the sites of both schools until a new site opened four years later. The Northicote site was demolished in 2018.
