= Listed buildings in Swindon, Staffordshire =

Swindon is a civil parish in the district of South Staffordshire, Staffordshire, England. It contains three listed buildings that are recorded in the National Heritage List for England. All the listed buildings are designated at Grade II, the lowest of the three grades, which is applied to "buildings of national importance and special interest". The parish contains the village of Swindon and the surrounding area. All the listed buildings are in the village, and consist of a public house and an adjoining barn, and a range of farm buildings.

== Buildings ==
| Name and location | Photograph | Date | Notes |
|---|---|---|---|
| The Greyhound; 52.51449°N 2.20293°W | | Early 18th century | A house, later a public house, it is in red brick with a dentilled eaves band, and a tile roof. There are three storeys, two bays, two parallel ranges, and a rear extension. The central doorway has a segmental head, and the windows are casements, those in the lower two floors with segmental heads. |
| Barn, stables, coach house and granary, Manor Farm; 52.51381°N 2.20234°W | — | 18th century | The oldest parts are the barn and the ground floor of the stables, the rest being added in the 19th century. The building is in red brick with tile roofs, and it forms an L-shaped plan, with the barn facing the road, and the rest at right angles to the rear. The barn has three bays, and contains full-height double doors and vents in various patterns. The stables contain four stable doors with segmental heads, five windows and four gabled dormers, beyond is a gabled coach house containing a carriage arch and a loading door, and at the end is a square tower with a pyramidal roof and steps leading up to a granary door. |
| Barn southwest of The Greyhound; 52.51436°N 2.20313°W | | Early 19th century | The barn is in red brick with a dentilled eaves band and a tile roof. There is one storey and three bays, with pilaster strips between the bays and on the corners. The barn contains a central cart entry with a semi-elliptical head, and rows of square air vents. |
