= Kinver Forest =

Royal Forest in Staffordshire, England

Kinver Forest was a Royal Forest, mainly in Staffordshire.

== Extent ==
References to "forest" in Domesday Book suggest that the forest was of similar extent in 1086 and in the 14th century. Its precise extent in the intervening period can only be deduced from the places summoned to attend forest courts in the 13th century or which were declared disforested in whole or part in the Great Perambulation of 1300.

At its greatest extent its boundaries met those of Feckenham Forest on the southeast and Morfe Forest on the northwest. However, it probably included Wolverley and Kidderminster, which were not in the post-1300 forest. It stretched north to Lower Penn and Seisdon and thus occupied much of the lower stour and Smestow valleys, stretching west to the Shropshire boundary and east approximately to the road from Worcester to Stafford, through Stourbridge and Wolverhampton. To its east was Pensnett Chase of the lords of Dudley.

In the 13th century, Worcester Cathedral Priory was authorised to appoint its own officers to keep the woods in Wolverley, which weakened the impact of the forest law on that manor.

Under the Great Perambulation of 1300, the bounds were greatly reduced. The new area seems to have consisted just of the parish of Kinver with Ashwood Hay in Kingswinford parish and Chasepool Hay. These hays (together with Iverley Hay (in Kinver) were hedged hunting areas.

The manor of Kingsley, near Tettenhall remained a detached part of the forest and of the manor of Kinver. It is called the Hay of Kingesley in 1358.

== Officers ==
The wardenship of the forest was an office annexed to the manor of Kinver and Stourton, which was held from the king by a rent of £9 per year and the serjeanty keeping the forest. A separate office of Riden of the forest occurs from 1388.

The office of bailiff of Ashwood Hay was also hereditary, the farm of Prestwood being held by the performance of this office.

The herbage, pannage and other perquisites of Chasepool Hay was granted to John Sutton, 1st Baron Dudley in 1454. His grandson Edward Sutton, 2nd Baron Dudley was made Lieutenant of the Forest on his death in 1487. He was succeeded both in the Lieutenancy and in custody of Chasepool Hay by the Duke of Norfolk, who was in turn succeeded by John Dudley, Duke of Northumberland. This reverted to the crown on his attainder in 1553. When his ancestral estates were restored to Edward Sutton, 4th Baron Dudley, he was granted Chasepool and Ashwood Hays, though not Prestwood. This led to a dispute between his son and Gilbert Lyttelton as owner of Prestwood, over the boundary between Ashwood Hay and Prestwood Hill at the end of the century.

Iverley Hay had a keeper in the 16th century.

In addition, the forest had the usual verderers and regarders.
