= Park Village =

Area of Wolverhampton, England

Coordinates: 52.597°N 2.115°W

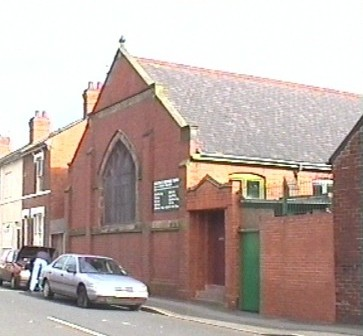
- Stratton Street Methodist Church

- Location within the West Midlands
- Metropolitan borough: Wolverhampton
- Metropolitan county: West Midlands
- Region: West Midlands
- Country: England
- Sovereign state: United Kingdom
- Post town: Wolverhampton
- Postcode district: WV
- Dialling code: 01902
- Police: West Midlands
- Fire: West Midlands
- Ambulance: West Midlands
- UK Parliament: Wolverhampton North East

Park Village is an inner city area of Wolverhampton, West Midlands, England. It is situated in the north-east of the city on the A460 Cannock Road, which at that point is the border between the city council's Bushbury South and Low Hill and Heath Town wards.

== Park Village today ==
Park Village is characterised by its Victorian, mainly terraced, housing. There was an even larger amount of such housing in the area until about 1970, when a significant amount of it was demolished and replaced by flats and maisonettes. This new development is known locally as New Park Village.

A large park exists, called 'Fowler's Park'. It is accessible from Prole Street and Nine Elms Lane, as well as adjacent areas Low Hill, Bushbury and Fox's Lane leading out to Five Ways Island on the A449 Stafford Road. The Smestow Brook, rising in nearby Springfields, runs through the park before being culverted at the far end. The park features a large pond, skate park and several football pitches. A well mentioned as one of Wolverhampton's original boundary markers in the 985 Charter granted to Lady Wulfrun, is thought to exist in the park near the Smestow Brook culvert entrance.
