= Greensforge =

Hamlet in Staffordshire, England

Coordinates: 52.4971°N 2.2057°W

- Location within Staffordshire
- OS grid reference: SO861888
- District: South Staffordshire
- Shire county: Staffordshire
- Region: West Midlands
- Country: England
- Sovereign state: United Kingdom
- Post town: Kingswinford, Dudley
- Postcode district: DY6
- Police: Staffordshire
- Fire: Staffordshire
- Ambulance: West Midlands
- UK Parliament: South Staffordshire

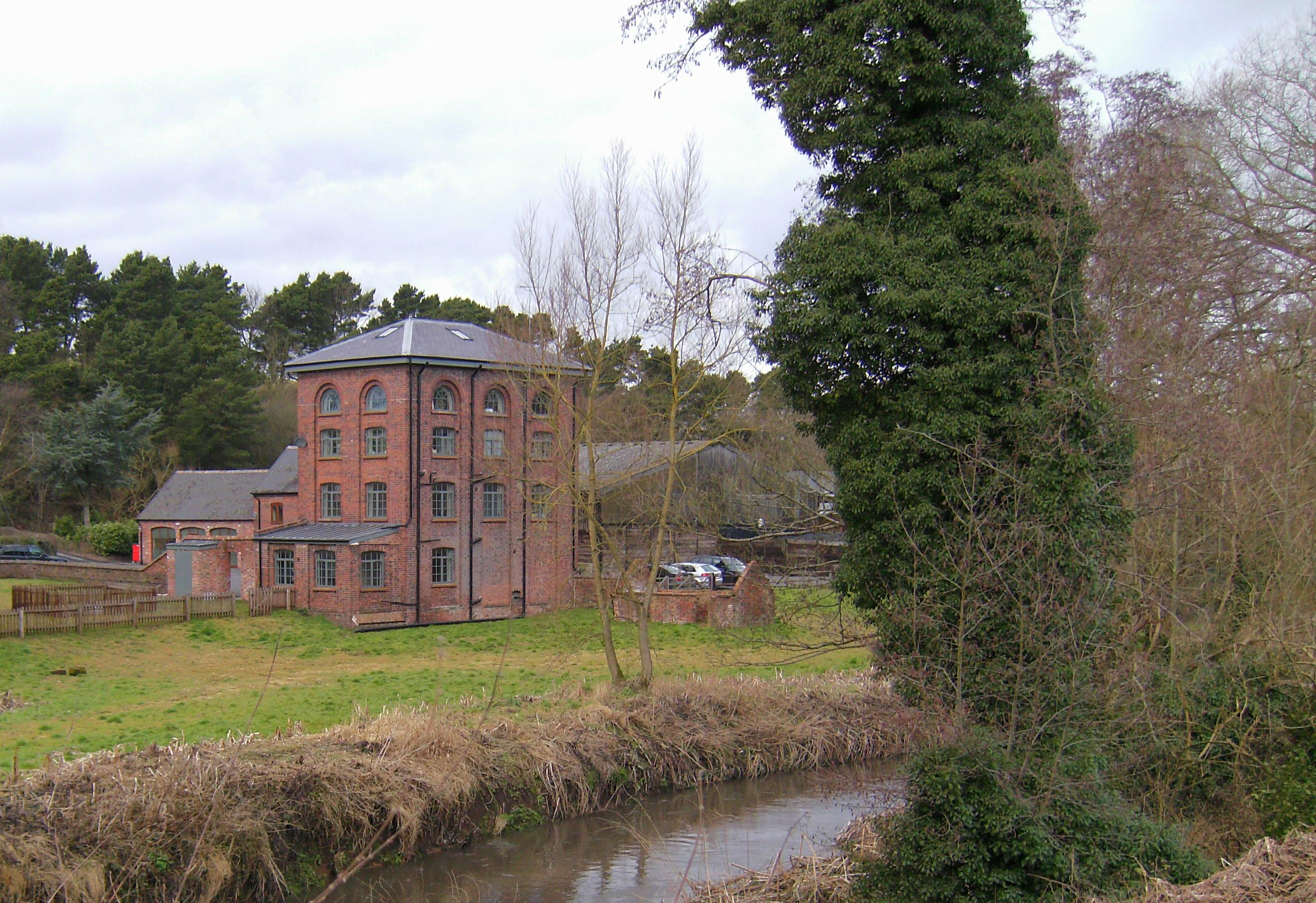
Greensforge Mill, the Victorian corn mill, now converted to apartments, with the Smestow Brook in the foreground.

Greensforge is a scattered hamlet on the boundary of Kinver and Swindon parishes, in South Staffordshire, England. It is noted for its Roman associations and its industrial heritage.

== Etymology ==
The hamlet takes its name from a finery forge established there in the early 17th century: Mr Green's Forge. This was typical of early industrial development all along the Smestow Brook, in which bloomeries, foundries and forges used local water supplies and charcoal.

== History ==
The hamlet was not the earliest settlement in the area. The name Greensforge is also used for a group of Romans forts lying on the west of the brook, partly in Ashwood. The remains of one fort, extending to 2.3 hectares, are visible as a low banked enclosure on either side of Mile Flat, just east of the canal locks and wharf. This dates from period 60-80 AD. It was identified at least as early as the 18th century and numerous finds of pottery and other objects were made before it was excavated in 1929. The other, earlier, 1.8 hectare site was detected only because of air photography, but subsequently confirmed by archaeological excavation. This is a Claudian structure, dating from the earliest days of the Roman occupation. It was built to utilise the defensive possibilities of the Smestow Brook and its tributary the Dawley Brook, which today feeds into the canal through the marina at Ashwood. There are also the remains of several Roman marching camps in the immediate area.

The eponymous forge replaced a decayed mill on the Smestow Brook. Greensforge formed part of a strip of meadows along the Smestow Brook, which were assart lands of Kinver Forest, i.e. lands cleared by medieval settlers. It was let to servants of Lord Dudley and may have been used by Dud Dudley. The forge was converted to a blade mill for sharpening scythes and other edged tools in the 1680s. This was rebuilt as a corn mill in the 19th century. This has recently (in 2008) been converted into flats.

Around 1770, the Staffordshire and Worcestershire Canal, planned by James Brindley, was driven through Greensforge and it was opened in May 1772. A brick bridge was constructed, with wharf and locks. These remain, now overshadowing the river and mill, which lie a little to their west.
