= Prestwood (Kinver) =

Hamlet in South Staffordshire, England

Coordinates: 52.473°N 2.199°W

Prestwood is a hamlet now in the parish of Kinver, but in the Kingswinford until the creation of Brierley Hill Urban District in the 1930s.

== History ==
The name is derived from priests' wood because it was part of the estate of Haswic, which was confirmed to Lady Wulfrun and used by her to endow the priests of Wolverhampton, but in 1086, it was waste, because of the king's forest.

Haswic became Ashwood Hay, one of three hays (hedged hunting areas) of Kinver Forest. The hay was managed by a bailiff, who occupied the farm of Prestwood by the sergeanty of keeping the bailiwick of Ashwood Hay. This belonged to a family who took their name from the estate and owned it for over a century until Richard de Prestwood granted it to William son of Adam de Chetwynd in 1292. William granted it to Agnes widow of Roger de Somery of Dudley Castle and her son. On the death of John de Somery in 1322, it was described as half a carucate and some meadow, but on the death of Roger de Hilary in 1357, it consisted of a messuage, a virgate, and 10 acres of meadow, though it is not clear why it should have been his, as it long continued to be the property of the lords of Dudley Castle. It thus came into the hands of John Dudley, Duke of Northumberland, the Lord Protector to Edward VI, but was attainted of high treason following the accession of Mary I.

In 1554, the estate was granted by the queen to Edward Hastynges, who quickly sold it to Sir John Lyttelton. In 1597, there was a dispute between his son Gilbert Lyttelton and Edward Sutton, 5th Baron Dudley, as the owner of Ashwood Hay. This seems to have related to the boundary between Ashwood Hay and Prestwood Hill (which was open to it) and whether Lyttelton had the right to graze cattle on Ashwood Hay (by then a common. This resulted in Star Chamber proceedings and was part of a political dispute between the two families on the same date.

Gilbert's son John Lyttelton died in prison, having been attainted for complicity in Essex's rebellion, so that his estates were forfeited. Most of his estates were restored by James I to his widow Merriel, but only in 1618, did she regain Prestwood (now described as a manor). Three years later it was sold to Sir Edward Sebright, 1st Baronet, for £3,000. His son sold it to Thomas Foley the great ironmaster, who settled it on his youngest son Philip Foley.

Philip Foley rebuilt the house as a mansion, which remained the family home of his descendants for over 250 years, passing to his son Paul, his grandson William, and great-grandson (also William). On the death of the great-grandson, it passed to his sister Elizabeth Foley, who married John Hodgetts of Shut End. Their only child Eliza Maria Foley Hodgetts in 1790 married her distant cousin Hon. Edward Foley. Under their marriage settlement, the Prestwood estate passed to her second son John Hodgetts-Foley and then to his son Henry Hodgetts-Foley. Henry's son Paul Henry Foley inherited the Stoke Edith estate on the death of Lady Emily Foley but sold most of the Prestwood estate in the 1920s.

== Prestwood House ==
Prestwood House was in the past used as a tuberculosis sanatorium, this due to the fact that the air quality in the area is exceptional.

The house subsequently became a care home, which was closed down several years ago. It now serves as the offices of the company which manages the site.

In the existing grounds that were once the sanatorium is a small housing estate for over-55s known as The Oval.
