= Lower Penn =

Village in Staffordshire, England

Coordinates: 52.5551°N 2.1781°W

- Location within Staffordshire
- Population: 998 (2011)
- OS grid reference: SO880952
- District: South Staffordshire
- Shire county: Staffordshire
- Region: West Midlands
- Country: England
- Sovereign state: United Kingdom
- Post town: Wolverhampton
- Postcode district: WV4
- Dialling code: 01902
- Police: Staffordshire
- Fire: Staffordshire
- Ambulance: West Midlands

Lower Penn is a village in South Staffordshire, situated to the south-west of Wolverhampton, West Midlands.

The Civil Parish covers the area of the historic Parish of Penn that is not now covered by the city of Wolverhampton and thus covers a wider area than that immediately surrounding the village. Part of the parish is considered by the ONS to be part of the Wolverhampton sub-area of the West Midlands conurbation.

Lower Penn has a village hall known as Victory Hall, and a pub/restaurant, The Greyhound.

== Notable people ==
- John Clarkson Major (1826 – 1895 in Lower Penn) a successful manufacturing chemist who set up the first tar distillery in Wolverhampton, Major & Company Ltd. He served as Mayor of Wolverhampton 1873/74.
- Dave Hill (born 1946) an English musician, lead guitarist and backing vocalist in the English band Slade; known for his flamboyant stage clothes and hairstyle. He lives in Lower Penn with his wife and three children.
- Warren Bullock (born 1965) a professional ballroom dancer and dance teacher. He lives in Lower Penn with his wife and their three children.
- Anya Chalotra (born 1996) an English actress, known for her roles in Wanderlust and The Witcher TV series. She grew up in Lower Penn with her family.

== See also ==
- Listed buildings in Lower Penn
