= Swindon, Staffordshire =

Village in Staffordshire, England

Coordinates: 52.512863°N 2.204483°W

Swindon
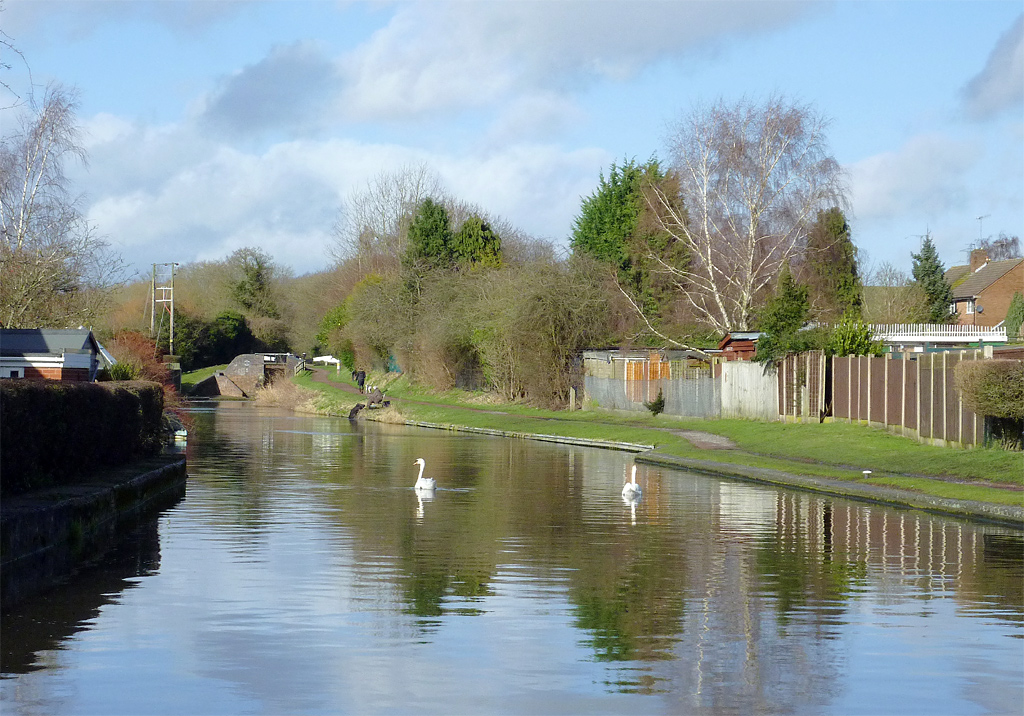
- The Staffordshire and Worcestershire Canal in Swindon

- Location within Staffordshire
- Population: 1,279 (2021 Census)
- District: South Staffordshire
- Shire county: Staffordshire
- Region: West Midlands
- Country: England
- Sovereign state: United Kingdom
- Post town: Dudley
- Postcode district: DY3
- Police: Staffordshire
- Fire: Staffordshire
- Ambulance: West Midlands
- UK Parliament: South Staffordshire

Swindon is a village and civil parish located in the district of South Staffordshire, in the county of Staffordshire, England. It is 6 miles (6 km) west of Dudley, 2 miles (6 km) northwest of Kingswinford and 2 miles (6 km) southwest of Wombourne. Swindon is located just outside the county and conurbation of the West Midlands. It borders the metropolitan boroughs of Dudley and Wolverhampton to the east and northwest. The parish which includes Swindon and the neighbouring villages of Hinksford and Smestow had a population of 1,279 recorded in the 2021 Census.

== History ==
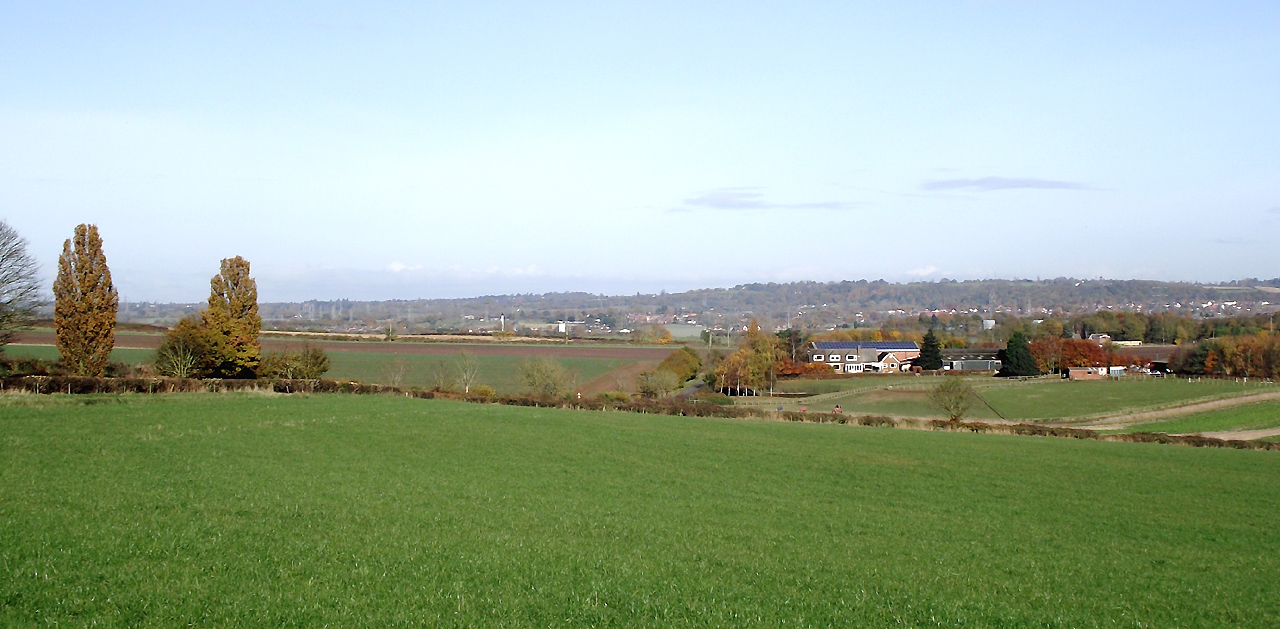
Skyline of both Swindon and the wider West Midlands Conurbation

Swindon was formerly part of the parish of Wombourne, A manor belonged to Englefield family, the lords of Englefield, Berkshire, as part of the manor of Himley. This manor was demised to John de Somery, Baron Somery the tenant in chief ub c.1316 and by 1346 passed to his nephew John de Sutton II, who had succeeded to the barony of Dudley. The manor then descended as part of the family estates in the area at least until William Humble Eric Ward, 3rd Earl of Dudley sold his local estates in 1947.

Chasepool is mentioned in Domesday Book as part of the property of William Fitz-Ansculf, lord of Dudley, but was waste on account of the forest. It was one of the hays (enclosed areas for hunting) of Kinver Forest. The area passed into the hands of the lords of Dudley in the 15th century, initially as lessees of the herbage and pannage. It was granted to Edward Sutton, 4th Baron Dudley when the family property was restored to him in 1555 and devolved as part of the family estates until 1947 in the same was as Swindon. By 1600 there was a lodge (Chasepool Lodge), leased to Edward Green, who probably gave his name to the adjacent Greensforge. his son also Edward gave a lease for lives of it to his son Dud Dudley.

== Demographics ==
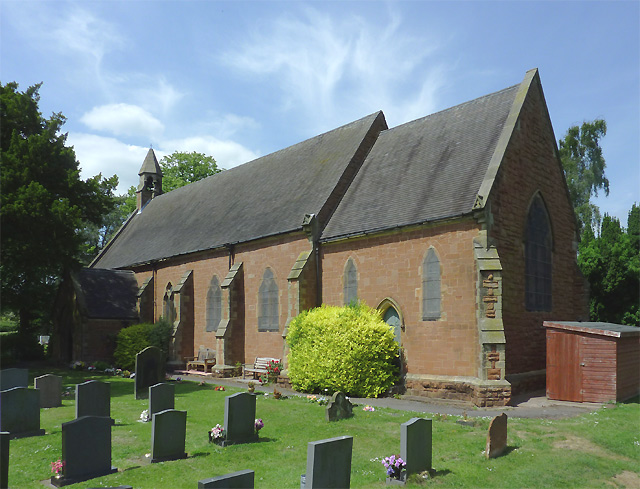
St John's Church. Swindon's parish church

The parish of Swindon including the villages of Hinksford and Smestow had a population of 1,279 in the 2021 Census. The gender makeup of the parish is 51.7% females and 48.3% males. Of the local population, around 1,251 were born in the UK, followed by 12 residents being born in the EU, 8 were born in Africa and 2 residents were born in the Middle East and Asia and 5 were born from other countries. The ethnicity makeup of the parish is 97.5% White residents, followed by 1.2% Mixed Race, 1% Asian and 0.2% Black residents. The religious makeup of the parish was 71.3% Christians, followed by 27.4% irreligious and other religions were less than 0.5% of the overall population of the parish.

== Amenities ==
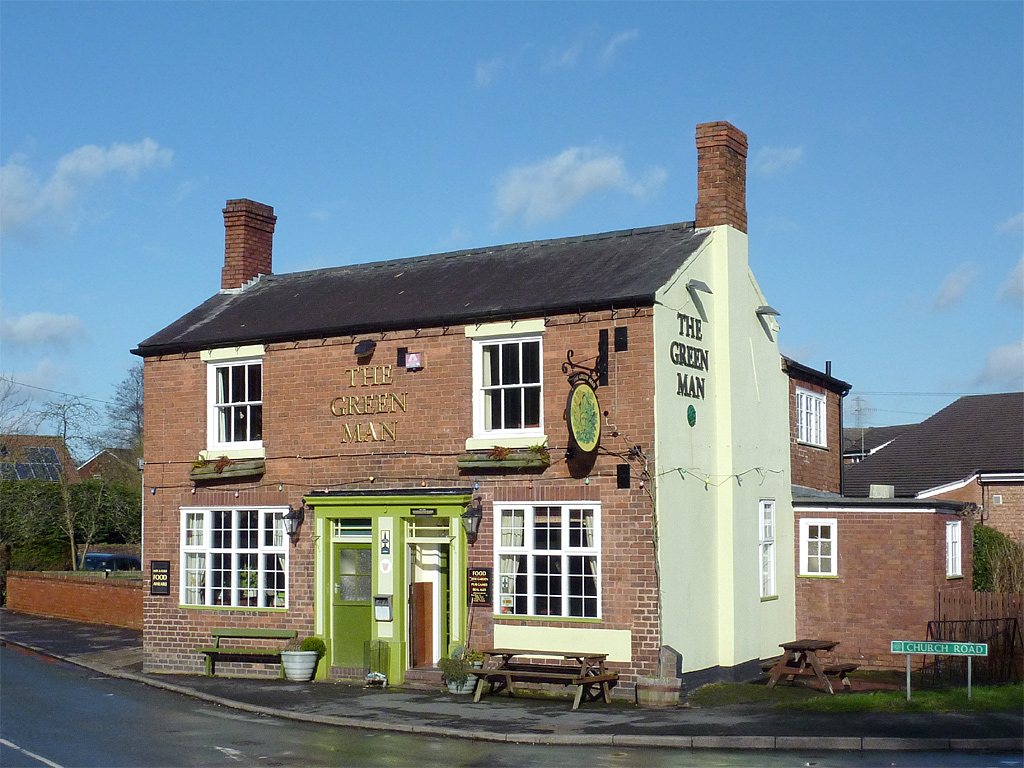
The Green Man Pub, Swindon

The village has a small range of shops including:

- The Green Man Pub
- The Old Bush Inn Pub
- Swindon Community Centre
- Boutique shop
- General Practice
- Fish and Chips Shop
- Hairdressers
- Convenience Shop

The village is also home to two churches, Swindon United Reform Church and St John's Church of England Parish Church which also includes a Primary School. The church of St John's was built in 1854 and is currently not a listed building but is part of the Smestow Vale Team which also includes St. Michael's Church in Himley and the Anglican churches in Wombourne, Trysull and Bobbington.

The village has seen a slight demand for developments of housing on the greenbelt but this has been met with backlash from residents and councilors.

== Transport ==
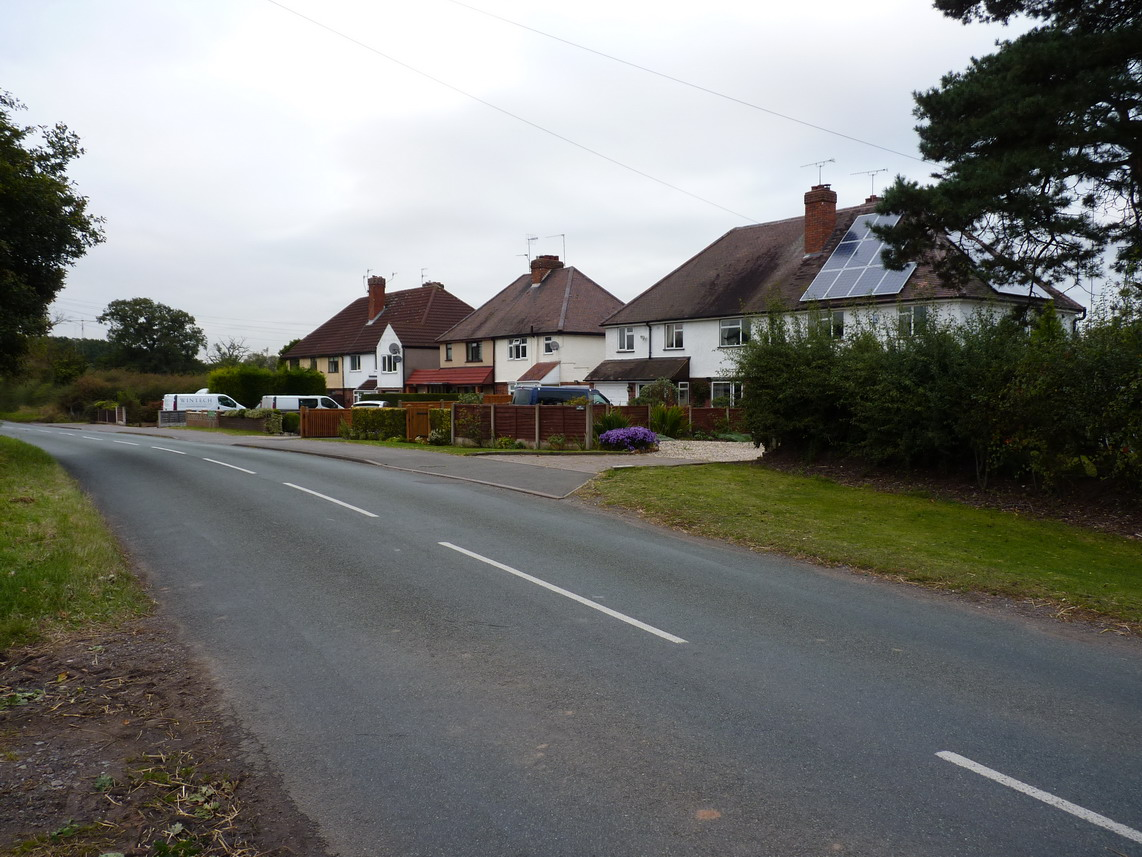
Church Farm, Swindon

Swindon is nestled in the Staffordshire countryside and as a result, it is not near any immediate A-roads or Motorways. It is however, served by bus route 16, which links it to Stourbridge, Wolverhampton, Kingswinford, Wordsley and Wombourne. The service is operated by National Express West Midlands. As well bus route 242S (operated by Diamond Bus) links it to nearby Kinver and its high school, that runs from Hyperion Road in the village and to other villages including Stourton, Enville, Potters Cross, Wall Heath and Himley.

The nearest railway stations to the village are Stourbridge Junction and Wolverhampton. The village was close to the now-closed, Wombourne Branch Line that ran between Wolverhampton and Stourbridge via Wombourne. The nearest railway station on the line to the village would have been at Himley which was located on Himley Lane around a mile to the east of the village. This opened in 1925 but closed in 1932 with the line ceasing operations between Pensnett and Wolverhampton. The line is now the South Staffordshire Railway Walk.

== Iron Works ==
Swin or Swindon Forge was once a fulling mill then a corn mill belonging to Halesowen Abbey. This was converted into a finery forge, perhaps in the 1620s. This was leased to Thomas Foley in 1647 and passed to his son Philip with many of his other ironworks in 1669. After he sold it in 1674, it passed through various hands, coming into the hands of Francis Homfray of Oldswinford by the 1720s, remaining in the hands of this family until 1820. The works were much enlarged in the 19th century, so that in 1859 there were 13 puddling furnaces. It was leased in 1866 to E. P. and W. Baldwin, the owners of the Wilden Ironworks. Their successor company amalgamated to form Richard Thomas & Baldwin Ltd, which became part of the nationalised British Steel Corporation, who closed the works in 1976. During World War II many of the village males who worked there were given reserved occupation status as the works was considered vital to the war effort. The works were demolished in the early 1980s to make way for new housing, the developments were named Swin Forge Way and Baldwin Way, Baldwin coming from the name of the works. All that remains today is the canteen which is now used as the village community centre.

== See also ==
- Listed buildings in Swindon, Staffordshire
