= 2022 City of Wolverhampton Council election =

Election in Wolverhampton, England

Results of the 2022 City of Wolverhampton Council election

The 2022 City of Wolverhampton Council election took place on 5 May 2022 to elect members of City of Wolverhampton Council. This was on the same day as other local elections. 20 of the 60 seats were up for election.

== Background ==
Since its first election in 1973, Wolverhampton Council has been a Labour council, aside from a brief period from to 1978 to 1979 when the party was overtaken by the Conservatives. Labour has controlled the council for its entire existence apart from brief periods of no overall control (1978 to 1980, 1987 to 1988, 1992 to 1994, and 2008 to 2011). In the 2021 election, Labour lost 5 seats with 47.2% of the vote, and the Conservatives gained 5 seats with 43.0%.

The seats up for election this year were last elected in 2018. In that election, Labour gained 2 seats with 58.04% of the vote, the Conservatives lost 1 with 33.69%, and UKIP lost representation on the council with 0.93%.

== Council composition ==
After 2021 election		Before 2022 election		After 2022 election	
Party	Seats	Party	Seats	Party	Seats
Labour	44	Labour	44	Labour	44
Conservative	15	Conservative	16	Conservative	16
Independent	1	Independent	0	Independent	0

Changes:

- June 2021: Gurmukh Singh joins Conservatives from Labour
- December 2021: Harman Banger (independent after losing Labour whip) resigns after being found guilty of fraud
- April 2022: Lovinyer Daley wins by-election for Labour from independent

== Results summary ==
2022 City of Wolverhampton Council election
Party	This election			Full council			This election		
Party	Seats	Net	Seats %	Other	Total	Total %	Votes	Votes %	+/−
Labour	17	Steady	85.00	27	44	73.33	28,685	57.27	
Conservative	3	Steady	15.00	13	16	26.67	17,406	34.75	
Liberal Democrats	0	Steady	0.00	0	0	0.00	2,609	5.21	
Green	0	Steady	0.00	0	0	0.00	1,231	2.46	
TUSC	0	Steady	0.00	0	0	0.00	156	0.31	

== Results by ward ==
An asterisk indicates an incumbent councillor.

=== Bilston East ===
Bilston East
Party	Candidate	Votes	%	±%
Labour	Stephen Simkins*	1,459	68.47	+13.95
Conservative	Christopher Thompson	554	26.00	−6.08
TUSC	Hannah Davis	118	5.54	N/A
Majority		905	42.47	
Turnout		2,131	19.73	

=== Bilston North ===
Bilston North
Party	Candidate	Votes	%	±%
Labour	Philip Page*	1,376	64.88	+5.06
Conservative	Dan Perry-Preston	593	27.96	−6.52
Liberal Democrats	Eileen Birch	152	7.17	N/A
Majority		783	36.92	
Turnout		2,121	24.04	

=== Blakenhall ===
Blakenhall
Party	Candidate	Votes	%	±%
Labour	Jasbinder Dehar*	1,931	79.17	+7.23
Conservative	Nathaniel Williams	361	14.80	−2.21
Liberal Democrats	Patrick Bentley	147	6.03	−0.28
Majority		1,570	64.37	
Turnout		2,439	28.50	

=== Bushbury North ===
Bushbury North
Party	Candidate	Votes	%	±%
Conservative	Simon Bennett	1,253	50.26	−7.97
Labour	Alan Butt*	1,096	43.96	+9.72
Liberal Democrats	Harry Marston	144	5.78	+1.70
Majority		157	6.30	
Turnout		2,493	28.55	

=== Bushbury South and Low Hill ===
Bushbury South and Low Hill
Party	Candidate	Votes	%	±%
Labour	Paul Sweet*	1,319	64.15	+5.91
Conservative	Lewis Wastell	478	23.25	−12.90
Liberal Democrats	Ian Jenkins	259	12.60	N/A
Majority		841	40.90	
Turnout		2,056	18.90	

=== East Park ===
East Park
Party	Candidate	Votes	%	±%
Labour	Louise Miles	1,194	69.22	+15.07
Conservative	Aaron Hall	531	30.78	−8.79
Majority		663	38.43	
Turnout		1,725	19.05	

=== Ettingshall ===
Ettingshall
Party	Candidate	Votes	%	±%
Labour	Beverley Momenabadi*	2,168	73.67	+6.1
Conservative	Sian Kumar	476	16.17	−3.1
Liberal Democrats	David Murray	299	10.16	+0.7
Majority		1,692	57.49	
Turnout		2,943	26.03	

=== Fallings Park ===
Fallings Park
Party	Candidate	Votes	%	±%
Labour	Steve Evans*	1,343	62.61	+15.5
Conservative	Zahid Shah	591	27.55	−16.7
Liberal Democrats	Peter Nixon	211	9.84	+5.4
Majority		752	35.06	
Turnout		2,145	24.38	

=== Graiseley ===
Graiseley
Party	Candidate	Votes	%	±%
Labour	Asha Mattu*	1,643	64.20	+5.0
Conservative	Safyaan Salim	525	20.52	−8.2
Green	Amy Bertaut	250	9.77	+1.5
Liberal Democrats	Peter Hollis	141	5.51	+1.7
Majority		1,118	43.69	
Turnout		2,559	29.73	

=== Heath Town ===
Heath Town
Party	Candidate	Votes	%	±%
Labour	Jaspreet Jaspal*	1,185	60.99	+21.7
Conservative	Fortune Sibanda	433	22.29	−5.5
Liberal Democrats	Alan Bamber	166	8.54	+3.8
Green	Kwaku Tano-Yeboah	159	8.18	+0.9
Majority		752	38.70	
Turnout		1,943	21.97	

=== Merry Hill ===
Merry Hill
Party	Candidate	Votes	%	±%
Labour	Carol Hyatt	1,456	46.95	+9.7
Conservative	James Montero	1,450	46.76	−9.5
Liberal Democrats	David Marsh	195	6.29	N/A
Majority		6	0.19	
Turnout		3,101	33.87	

=== Oxley ===
Oxley
Party	Candidate	Votes	%	±%
Labour	Sue Roberts*	1,216	51.20	+8.4
Conservative	Matt Powis	878	36.97	−8.4
Liberal Democrats	Ann Jenkins	149	6.27	+1.1
Green	Paul Darke	94	3.96	−0.7
TUSC	Joshua Allerton	38	1.60	−0.3
Majority		338	14.23	
Turnout		2,375	26.89	

=== Park ===
Park
Party	Candidate	Votes	%	±%
Labour	Craig Collingswood*	1,524	58.98	+5.1
Conservative	Robert Brotherton	705	27.28	−7.2
Green	Jenny Hibell	237	9.17	+1.0
Liberal Democrats	Bryan Lewis	118	4.57	+1.2
Majority		819	31.70	
Turnout		2,584	31.34	

=== Penn ===
Penn
Party	Candidate	Votes	%	±%
Labour	Celia Hibbert*	1,948	50.58	+11.0
Conservative	Ranjit Dhillon	1,658	43.05	−11.5
Liberal Democrats	Michael Hopkins	245	6.36	N/A
Majority		290	7.53	
Turnout		3,851	39	

=== Spring Vale ===
Spring Vale
Party	Candidate	Votes	%	±%
Labour	Barbara McGarrity*	1,380	58.62	+4.4
Conservative	Surjit Khunkhun	974	41.38	+3.6
Majority		406	17.25	
Turnout		2,354	26.56	

=== St Peter's ===
St Peter's
Party	Candidate	Votes	%	±%
Labour	Obaida Ahmed*	1,388	78.82	+15.6
Conservative	John Mumford	373	21.18	−3.7
Majority		1,015	57.64	
Turnout		1,761	21.99	

=== Tettenhall Regis ===
Tettenhall Regis
Party	Candidate	Votes	%	±%
Conservative	Sohail Khan*	1,614	50.93	−8.7
Labour	Kashmire Hawker	1,107	34.93	+4.0
Liberal Democrats	Julian Donald	241	7.60	+3.6
Green	Christopher Brookes	207	6.53	+0.9
Majority		507	16.00	
Turnout		3,169	34.18	

=== Tettenhall Wightwick ===
Tettenhall Wightwick
Party	Candidate	Votes	%	±%
Conservative	Jonathan Crofts*	2,166	60.17	+1.5
Labour	Don Gwinnett	1,008	28.00	+6.7
Green	Andrea Cantrill	284	7.89	+0.2
Liberal Democrats	Arfan Khan	142	3.94	+0.1
Majority		1,158	32.17	
Turnout		3,600	39.96	

=== Wednesfield North ===
Wednesfield North
Party	Candidate	Votes	%	±%
Labour	Mary Bateman*	1,358	60.82	+8.0
Conservative	Tony Gething	875	39.18	−3.6
Majority		483	21.63	
Turnout		2,233	26.60	

=== Wednesfield South ===
Wednesfield South
Party	Candidate	Votes	%	±%
Labour	Greg Brackenridge*	1,586	63.34	+20.4
Conservative	Sucha Sahota	918	36.66	−15.4
Majority		668	26.68	
Turnout		2,504	28.72	
