= 2026 City of Wolverhampton Council election =

2026 English local government election

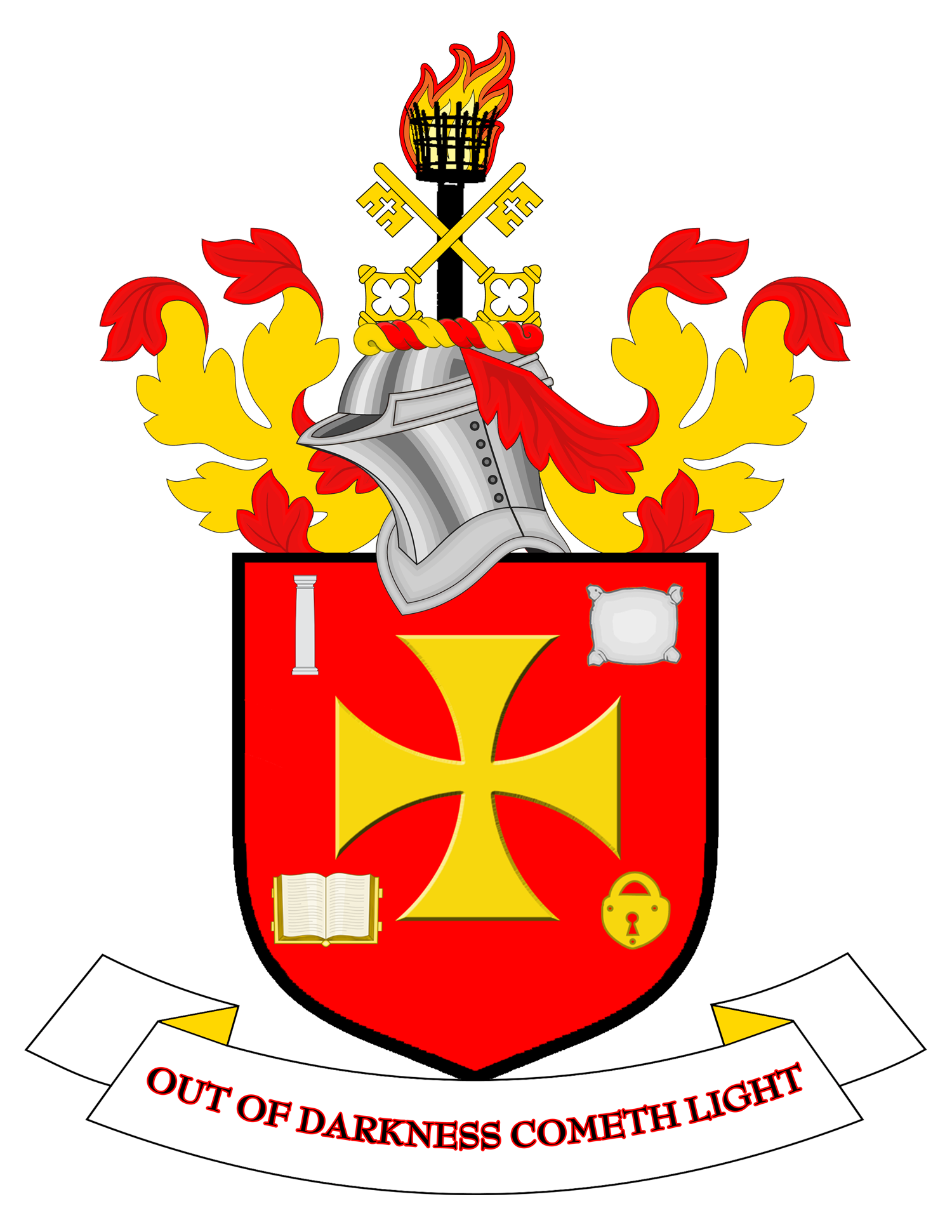
- 7 May 2026

21 out of 60 seats to City of Wolverhampton Council (including 1 by-election) 31 seats needed for a majority
	First party	Second party
Leader	Stephen Simkins	None
Party	Labour	Reform
Leader since	September 2023
Leader's seat	Bilston East
Last election	47 seats, 56.1%	Did not stand
Seats before	45	2
Seats won	6	12
Seats after	35	13
Seat change	▼10	▲11
Popular vote	19,174	23,035
Percentage	28.6%	34.4%
Swing	▼27.5%	N/A
	Third party	Fourth party
Leader	Simon Bennett	None
Party	Conservative	Independent
Last election	12 seats, 32.7%	1 seat, 1.2%
Seats before	11	2
Seats won	3	0
Seats after	10	2
Seat change	▼1	Steady
Popular vote	12,130	501
Percentage	18.1%	0.7%
Swing	▼14.6%	▼0.5%
- Winner of each seat at the 2026 City of Wolverhampton Council election.
Leader before election
Stephen Simkins
Labour
Leader after election
Stephen Simkins
Labour

The 2026 City of Wolverhampton Council election took place on Thursday 7 May 2026, alongside other local elections in the United Kingdom. There were 21 of the 60 seats on City of Wolverhampton Council in the West Midlands up for election, being the usual third of the council and a by-election.

The council remained under Labour control, but their majority was significantly reduced. Reform UK overtook the Conservatives to become the second largest party on the council.

== Council composition ==
After 2024 election		Before 2026 election		After 2026 election	
Party	Seats	Party	Seats	Party	Seats
Labour	47	Labour	44	Labour	35
Reform	0	Reform	2	Reform	13
Conservative	12	Conservative	11	Conservative	10
Independent	1	Independent	2	Independent	2
Vacant	N/A	Vacant	1	Vacant	N/A

Changes 2024–2026:

- June 2024: Claire Darke (Labour) leaves party to sit as an independent
- August 2024: Susan Roberts (Labour) dies – by-election held October 2024
- October 2024: Anita Stanley (Reform) gains by-election from Labour
- July 2025: Greg Brackenridge (Labour) suspended from party
- October 2025: Celia Hibbert (Independent, elected as Labour) joins Reform
- March 2026:
  - Greg Brackenridge (Independent) resigns – seat left vacant until 2026 election
  - Wendy Dalton (Conservative) leaves party to sit as an independent

== Summary ==
=== Background ===
Wolverhampton was created in 1974 as a metropolitan borough, gaining city status in 2000. Since its creation, the council has either been controlled by Labour or under no overall control. No party held a majority between 1987 and 1988, between 1992 and 1994, and between 2008 and 2011. Labour have held a majority for the previous 15 years, increasing their majority by 1 in 2024 through gaining a seat from the Conservatives.

The 2023 election took place on a new set of ward boundaries. As such, these elections will be for the councillors elected with the second-highest number of votes. Labour will be defending 16 seats and the Conservatives will be defending 4.

=== Election result ===
2026 City of Wolverhampton Council election
Party	This election				Full council			This election		
Party	Candidates	Seats	Net	Seats %	Other	Total	Total %	Votes	Votes %	+/−
Labour	{{{candidates}}}	6	▼10	30.0	29	35	58.3	19,174	28.6	–27.5
Reform	{{{candidates}}}	12	▲11	60.0	1	13	21.7	23,035	34.4	N/A
Conservative	{{{candidates}}}	3	▼1	15.0	7	10	16.7	12,130	18.1	–14.6
Independent	{{{candidates}}}	0	Steady	0.0	2	2	3.3	501	0.7	–0.5
Green	{{{candidates}}}	0	Steady	0.0	0	0	0.0	10,840	16.2	+10.1
Liberal Democrats	{{{candidates}}}	0	Steady	0.0	0	0	0.0	1,246	1.9	–1.7

== Incumbents ==
Ward	Incumbent councillor	Party	Re-standing
Bilston North	Anita Stanley	Reform	Yes
Bilston South	Gillian Wildman	Labour	Yes
Blakenhall	Tersaim Singh	Labour	Yes
Bushbury North	Andrew McNeil	Conservative	Yes
Bushbury South & Low Hill	Paul Brookfield	Labour	Yes
East Park	Louise Miles	Labour	Yes
Ettingshall North	Jeszemma Howl	Labour	Yes
Ettingshall South & Spring Vale	Jasbinder Dehar	Labour	Yes
Fallings Park	Chris Burden	Labour	Yes
Graiseley	John Reynolds	Labour	No
Heath Town	Milkinderpal Jaspal	Labour	No
Merry Hill	Carol Hyatt	Labour	Yes
Oxley	Jane Francis	Labour	Yes
Park	Craig Collingswood	Labour	Yes
Penn	Stephanie Haynes	Conservative	Yes
St Peters	Qaiser Azeem	Labour	Yes
Tattenhall Regis	Sohail Khan	Conservative	Yes
Tattenhall Wightwick	Jonathan Crofts	Conservative	Yes
Wednesfield North	Rita Potter	Labour	No
Wednesfield South	Ciaran Brackenridge	Labour	No

== Ward results ==
An asterisk (*) denotes an incumbent councillor seeking re-election.

=== Bilston North ===
Bilston North
Party	Candidate	Votes	%	±%
Reform	Anita Stanley*	1,439	42.4	N/A
Green	Harry Singh	962	28.4	N/A
Labour	Luke Guy	690	20.3	–51.0
Conservative	Audrey Okere	301	8.9	–19.8
Majority		477	14.1	N/A
Turnout		3,392	35.6	+9.1
Registered electors		9,601		
Reform hold				

=== Bilston South ===
Bilston South
Party	Candidate	Votes	%	±%
Reform	Micky Thomas	1,369	45.8	N/A
Labour	Jilly Wildman*	823	27.5	−42.6
Green	Tajinder Singh	495	16.6	N/A
Conservative	Dawn McNeil	302	10.1	−19.8
Majority		546	18.3	−21.9
Turnout		2,989	29.1	+7.2
Registered electors		10,319		
Reform gain from Labour				

=== Blakenhall ===
Blakenhall
Party	Candidate	Votes	%	±%
Labour Co-op	Tersaim Singh*	1,278	46.5	−28.6
Green	Vikas Chopra	541	19.7	+15.5
Conservative	Adam Ansari	412	15.0	−0.2
Reform	Adrian Perry	397	14.3	N/A
Liberal Democrats	Patrick Bentley	122	4.44	+1.56
Majority		737	26.8	−33.1
Turnout		2,750	31.7	−2.8
Registered electors		8,718		
Labour Co-op hold		Swing	▼22.1	

=== Bushbury North ===
Bushbury North
Party	Candidate	Votes	%	±%
Reform	Susan Lawrence	1,635	45.6	N/A
Conservative	Andrew McNeil*	713	19.9	−27.2
Labour	Gary Edwards	658	18.3	−26.9
Green	Sarabjit Singh	438	12.2	N/A
Liberal Democrats	Ann Jenkins	143	4.0	−3.7
Majority		922	25.7	N/A
Turnout		3,587	35.9	+6.5
Registered electors		10,012		
Reform gain from Conservative				

=== Bushbury South & Low Hill ===
Bushbury South & Low Hill
Party	Candidate	Votes	%	±%
Reform	Armin Berenjian	921	39.4	N/A
Labour	Paul Brookfield*	756	32.3	−38.1
Green	Cade Hatton	362	15.5	N/A
Conservative	Anthony Gething	219	9.4	−12.1
Independent	Shane Slater	81	3.5	N/A
Majority		165	7.05	N/A
Turnout		2,339	24.3	+4.5
Registered electors		9,654		
Reform gain from Labour				

=== East Park ===
East Park
Party	Candidate	Votes	%	±%
Reform	Dave Evans	1,029	39.8	N/A
Labour	Louise Miles*	868	33.6	−29.5
Green	Taliesin Edwards	368	14.2	N/A
Conservative	Joe Stepien	240	9.3	−13.7
Independent	Steve Hall	82	3.2	−10.8
Majority		161	6.2	N/A
Turnout		2,587	28.3	+5.1
Registered electors		9,197		
Reform gain from Labour				

=== Ettingshall North ===
Ettingshall North
Party	Candidate	Votes	%	±%
Labour	Jeszemma Howl*	1,032	37.4	−44.6
Green	Manpreet Singh	665	24.1	N/A
Reform	Gareth Walker	644	23.3	N/A
Conservative	Surrinder Ram	338	12.2	−5.8
Independent	Tracy Cooper	82	3.0	N/A
Majority		367	13.3	−50.7
Turnout		2,761	27.5	−0.7
Registered electors		10,084		
Labour hold				

=== Ettingshall South & Spring Vale ===
Ettingshall South & Spring Vale
Party	Candidate	Votes	%	±%
Reform	Rob Greenway	1,632	47.2	N/A
Labour Co-op	Jasbinder Dehar*	1,020	29.5	−42.3
Conservative	Siân Kumar	423	12.2	−15.9
Green	Manish Kumar	382	11.1	N/A
Majority		612	17.7	N/A
Turnout		3,457	35.9	+6.5
Registered electors		9,650		
Reform gain from Labour Co-op				

=== Fallings Park ===
Fallings Park
Party	Candidate	Votes	%	±%
Reform	Stu Goldsmith	1,230	41.8	N/A
Labour Co-op	Chris Burden*	842	28.6	−28.1
Conservative	Julia Dickens	416	14.2	−17.1
Green	Tony Wortley	300	10.2	N/A
Liberal Democrats	Peter Nixon	152	5.2	+0.2
Majority		388	13.2	N/A
Turnout		2,940	32.3	+6.6
Registered electors		9,130		
Reform gain from Labour Co-op				

=== Graiseley ===
Graiseley
Party	Candidate	Votes	%	±%
Labour	Gurbax Kaur	1,126	37.6	−21.7
Green	Suki Bains	676	22.6	+14.3
Reform	Sarp Dayanik	661	22.1	N/A
Conservative	Prabhjot Kaur Saini	349	11.7	−7.8
Liberal Democrats	Jessica Pringle	185	6.2	+2.8
Majority		450	15.1	−24.7
Turnout		2,997	34.5	+1.2
Registered electors		8,702		
Labour hold		Swing	▼18.0	

=== Heath Town ===
Heath Town
Party	Candidate	Votes	%	±%
Labour	Rob Siarkiewicz	744	33.2	−31.1
Reform	Ash Singh	666	29.8	N/A
Green	Hardeep Singh	559	25.0	+15.5
Conservative	Niall Wood	270	12.1	−9.3
Majority		78	3.5	−39.6
Turnout		2,239	26.1	+2.6
Registered electors		8,655		
Labour hold				

=== Merry Hill ===
Merry Hill
Party	Candidate	Votes	%	±%
Reform	Im Stanley	1,331	34.4	N/A
Labour Co-op	Carol Hyatt*	1,147	29.6	−18.0
Conservative	Andy Simpkins	888	22.9	−22.2
Green	Paul Darke	506	13.1	+5.9
Majority		184	4.8	N/A
Turnout		3,872	42.6	+6.9
Registered electors		9,128		
Reform gain from Labour Co-op				

=== Oxley ===
Oxley
Party	Candidate	Votes	%	±%
Reform	Joe Berg	1,182	33.4	N/A
Labour Co-op	Jane Francis*	912	25.8	−24.3
Conservative	Adam Collinge	794	22.4	−13.4
Green	Marcin Kruczynski	497	14.0	+4.8
Liberal Democrats	Ian Jenkins	155	4.4	−0.5
Majority		270	7.6	N/A
Turnout		3,540	33.9	+6.0
Registered electors		10,476		
Reform gain from Labour Co-op				

=== Park ===
Park
Party	Candidate	Votes	%	±%
Labour	Craig Collingswood*	1,089	31.4	−21.6
Green	Mohammed Naseem	1,046	30.1	+14.5
Reform	Kat Stanley	600	17.3	N/A
Conservative	Harpreet Singh Multani	454	13.1	−9.1
Independent	Jamie Salvin	144	4.2	N/A
Liberal Democrats	Bryan Lewis	141	4.1	−5.3
Majority		43	1.24	−29.6
Turnout		3,474	36.1	−2.8
Registered electors		9,673		
Labour hold		Swing	▼18.1	

=== Penn ===
Penn
Party	Candidate	Votes	%	±%
Conservative	Stephanie Haynes*	1,576	35.7	−9.6
Labour Co-op	Kashmire Hawker	1,236	28.0	−15.3
Reform	Pete Kelly	1,113	25.2	N/A
Green	Fareed Enver	492	11.1	+2.5
Majority		340	7.7	+5.7
Turnout		4,420	45.5	+6.0
Registered electors		9,746		
Conservative hold		Swing	▲2.9	

=== St Peters ===
St Peters
Party	Candidate	Votes	%	±%
Labour	Qaiser Azeem*	1,133	47.8	−3.6
Green	Adetoyese Anifalaje	668	28.1	+3.5
Reform	James Taylor	264	11.1	N/A
Conservative	Gillian Timms	193	8.1	−3.5
Independent	Muhammad Qayyum	112	4.7	N/A
Majority		465	19.6	−7.2
Turnout		2,370	26.7	−1.2
Registered electors		8,973		
Labour hold		Swing	▼3.6	

=== Tettenhall Regis ===
Tettenhall Regis
Party	Candidate	Votes	%	±%
Conservative	Sohail Khan*	1,310	32.8	−19.1
Reform	Theresa D'Cruze	1,273	31.9	N/A
Labour	Kye Barton	642	16.1	−16.7
Green	Jenny Hibell	562	14.1	+6.6
Liberal Democrats	Julian Donald	204	5.1	−2.7
Majority		37	0.9	−18.2
Turnout		3,991	43.1	+8.1
Registered electors		9,291		
Conservative hold				

=== Tettenhall Wightwick ===
Tettenhall Wightwick
Party	Candidate	Votes	%	±%
Conservative	Jonathan Crofts*	1,558	36.9	−26.1
Reform	Heather Chell	1,368	32.4	N/A
Labour Co-op	Calvin Bissitt	726	17.1	−9.7
Green	Don Gwinnett	574	13.6	+6.0
Majority		190	4.5	−31.7
Turnout		4,226	47.4	+7.7
Registered electors		8,933		
Conservative hold				

=== Wednesfield North ===
Wednesfield North
Party	Candidate	Votes	%	±%
Reform	Simon Kelsey	1,607	52.7	N/A
Labour	Andrew Foster	583	19.1	−47.0
Conservative	Robin Hacking	395	13.0	−20.9
Green	Nasia Ijas	318	10.4	N/A
Liberal Democrats	David Murray	144	4.7	N/A
Majority		1,024	33.6	+1.4
Turnout		3,047	36.1	+9.8
Registered electors		8,450		
Reform gain from Labour				

=== Wednesfield South ===
Wednesfield South elected two councillors due to the resignation of Greg Brackenridge.

Wednesfield South (2 seats due to by-election)
Party	Candidate	Votes	%	±%
Reform	Christopher Edmunds	1,383	46.5	N/A
Reform	Corey Kendrick	1,291	43.4	N/A
Labour	Harjinder Kaur	950	31.9	−18.7
Labour	Gursharan Singh	919	30.9	−19.7
Conservative	Peter Dickens	516	15.9	−19.9
Conservative	Andy Randle	463	15.6	−21.6
Green	Monika Kapoor	429	14.4	+2.1
Turnout		~3,250	35.7	+7.9
Registered electors		9,101		
Reform gain from Labour				
Reform gain from Labour				
