= Wolves in Wolves =

2017 art exhibition in Wolverhampton, England

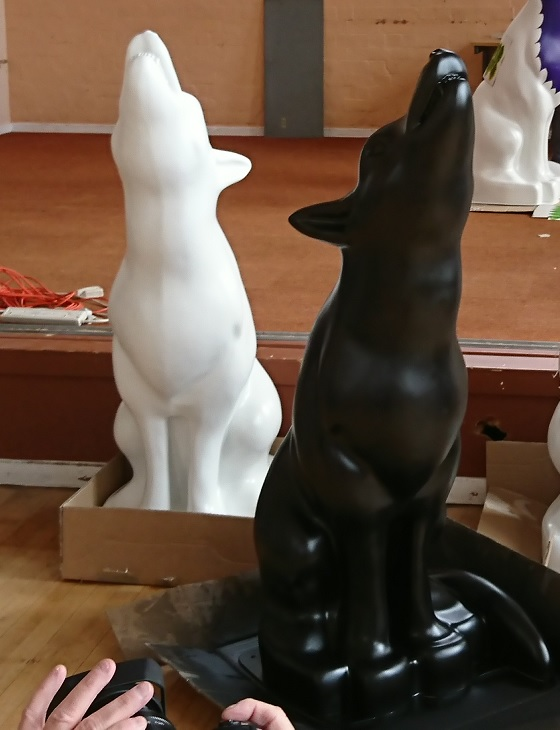
Wolves in Wolves sculptures prior to painting.

Wolves in Wolves was a public art exhibition which took place in Wolverhampton, England, between 5 July and 24 September 2017.

The event was conceived and proposed to City of Wolverhampton Council in 2015, through its '100 Bright Ideas' initiative by Council employee Mandeep ('Manor') Singh and when delivered it consisted of 30 two-metre-high wolf sculptures that were located throughout Wolverhampton. The wolves were individually decorated by local and international artists, with sponsorship funding provided by both public and private sector organisations. The wolves formed a 4.5 mile Wolf Trail taking in West Park, Chapel Ash and Wolverhampton city centre, with a map available to help people track them down. Wolves in Wolves was Wolverhampton's largest public art event ever to this date. Additionally, there was an exhibition of 70 mini-wolves sculptures, designed and painted by pupils from 35 primary schools, community groups and artists, on display at Wolverhampton Art Gallery for the duration of the event.

The ambition for Wolves in Wolves was to combine a quality artistic and cultural event with associated public health, educational and economic benefits as well as raising funds and awareness for key local organisations and charities.

== The event ==
Wolves in Wolves was a joint project between City of Wolverhampton Council, Outside Centre and Wolverhampton Business Improvement District (BID).

In May 2016, Outside Centre commissioned Marie Sewell to design the prototype wolf sculpture, which formed the basis of each exhibit. In March 2017, the first blank wolf sculpture was delivered to Moreton School situated in the Bushbury Hill area of the city, with the school pupils tasked with creating a design for the Mayoral Wolf; a wolf sculpture designed with the Mayor of Wolverhampton in mind. A further 29 blank sculptures were delivered to a studio, where local and international artists decorated each wolf sculpture in a unique manner.

The 30 large wolves were strategically exhibited along a "Wolf Trail" which wound through the city centre. At the same time City of Wolverhampton Art Gallery hosted an exhibition of over 70 miniature wolf sculptures which had been decorated by primary schools in the city and by local artists funded by Celebrate of the Big Lottery. Over 100,000 people visited the city to take part in the Wolf Trail walks over the summer of 2017, visit a pop-up shop selling branded "Wolves in Wolves" merchandise as well as items created by the artists who participated in the project.

The project was supported by several organisations in the city and region, who were categorised as Platinum, Gold or Silver sponsors (and other special project element supporters). These were HeadStart Wolverhampton, Hilton Main Construction, Learn Play Foundation, Mander Centre, Marston’s, Wolverhampton Civic and Historical Society, MoveCorp, Talent Match Black Country, NHS Wolverhampton Clinical Commissioning Group, Wolverhampton Speedway, University of Wolverhampton, Yoo Recruit, West Midlands Fire Service, Wolverhampton Wanderers FC, Arena Theatre, Enjoy Wolverhampton (Wolverhampton BID), Awards for All, and the Heritage Lottery Fund.

== Conclusion of the event ==
At the conclusion of the event, some sponsors retained their wolf sculptures, which may still be seen at various locations in the City of Wolverhampton today. Many of the Wolves in Wolves exhibits were sold at a celebratory Public Auction at Wolverhampton Wanderers' Molineux stadium on 2 November 2017.

More than 150 people attended the auction led by Fielding Auctioneers Ltd’s Will Farmer, who is well known for his appearances on BBC’s Antiques Roadshow. There were also online bids as 15 of the 2-metre-high wolves, and 40 of the mini-wolves, went under the hammer.

At the beginning of the Auction, The Mayor of the City of Wolverhampton, the late Cllr Elias Mattu, presented a special gold-coloured mini-wolf statute to Council employee Mandeep ('Manor') Singh, who had originally conceived the project and had worked as a project management assistant delivering the event.

‘Garden’ (by the artist Claire Rollerson) was the big wolf that went for the most money at £3,200, while the most expensive of the 40 mini-wolves was Ralph (by the artist Meg Gregory) at £1,000. The final sale proceeds of over £35,000 were divided between Outside Centre and the Charities of the Mayor of the City of Wolverhampton. These charities included:

- Wolverhampton Sickle Cell Care and Social Activity Centre
- Alzheimer’s Society Black Country
- Interfaith Wolverhampton
- LGBT Network Wolverhampton
- Central Youth Theatre
- Acorns Children’s Hospice
- Wolverhampton Street Pastors

== List of wolf statues ==
30 wolf sculptures, each uniquely designed by local and international artists, are situated in and around Wolverhampton city centre. The majority of these are outdoors, with some in art galleries and theatres.

Name	Artist(s)	Sponsor	Location
Wild	Stef Fridael	Dutch Embassy	Wolverhampton Art Gallery
Colour	Clemens Briels	Dutch Embassy	Wolverhampton Art Gallery
Love	Danielle Robotham	McAuliffe Group	Wolverhampton Registry Office
Hunter	Sophie Casewell	University of Wolverhampton	Wolverhampton School of Art
Old Gold	Alex Vann	Wolverhampton Wanderers FC	Molineux Football Stadium
The Sitting	Jasyn Lucas	Travel Manitoba	WV Active Central
Bayliss	Jody Lee Williams	Wolverhampton Clinical Commissioning Group	West Park (near bandstand)
Thomas	Sunita Meen	Marston's PLC	Marston's Brewery Shop
Sunset	Jemima Mantle	Wolverhampton Speedway	Darlington Street
Support Life	Alex Vann	Suicide Prevention Forum	Victoria Street
Compton	Harriet Davies	Daler Rowney	Wolverhampton Market
Kiyiya	Jo Burgess	Arena Theatre	The Way, School Street
Rainbow	Julie Fletcher	National Car Parks (NCP)	Snow Hill
Meditation	Nigel James Kilworth	Framers Gallery	Central Library
Hope	HeadStart Team	HeadStart	Wulfrun Centre (Atrium)
Aurora	Katie Keith	Talent Match	Wulfrun Centre (Entrance)
Endless Opportunities	Jody Lee Williams	YOO Recruit	St Georges Metro Station
Dynasty	Laura Hickman & Kesia Pennington-Yates	#bigcelebration	Princess Street
Flame	Mark Lavendar & David Miller	West Midlands Fire Brigade	Express & Star, Queen Street
Garden	Claire Rollerson	Grand Theatre	Wolverhampton Bus Station
Wolfy McWolf	Emily Bland	Move Corp	Railway Drive
Sacred Grandfathers	Jasyn Lucas	Thompson's Spirit Way	Chubb Buildings
Beanstalk	Navkiran Klare	Grand Theatre	Grand Theatre, Lichfield Street
The Fallen	Claire Darke MBE	Heritage Lottery Fund	St. Peter's Gardens
Fenrir	Marie Sewell & Neil Hodgkiss	Wolverhampton Homes	Arena Theatre, Wulfruna Street
Wolf Ver-Hampton	Moreton School	City of Wolverhampton Council	Civic Centre (Main Entrance)
Zeus	Highfields School	WV Active	The Big Phone Store (Car Park)
Beowulf	Parastoo Duffett	Enjoy Wolverhampton	Queen Square
Mander	Julie Fletcher & Laura Hickman	Mander Centre	Mander Centre
Claude	Belinda Maria Longsden	Enjoy Wolverhampton	Mobile Wolf
