= List of people from the Wirral =

The following is a list of notable people who are associated or born within the area known as the Wirral Peninsula.

== A ==
- Nigel Adkins (born 1965), footballer and football manager
- Freya Anderson (born 2001), Olympic gold medal swimmer
- Ian Astbury (born 1962), lead vocalist, The Cult

== B ==
- Shirley Ballas (born 1960), ballroom dancer & TV personality
- Andy Baddeley (born 1982), runner
- Elizabeth Berrington (born 1970), actress
- Nigel Blackwell (born 1957), singer, guitarist and songwriter
- Chris Boardman (born 1968), cyclist
- Ian Botham (born 1955), cricketer
- Adrian Boult (1889–1983), conductor
- John Bowe (born 1950), actor
- Jim Bowen (1937–2018), comedian & TV personality
- Paul Bracewell (born 1962), footballer
- Peter Bromley (1929–2003), sports broadcaster
- Margaret Brownlow (1916–1968), illustrator, writer, herb farmer and garden designer
- Fiona Bruce (born 1964), TV presenter
- Pete Burns (1959–2016), singer/songwriter
- William John Burton (1908–1985), draftsman, archer & rifleman

== C ==
- Cathy Cassidy (born 1962), children's author
- Jimmy Cauty (born 1956), musician, artist, one half of The KLF
- Niamh Charles (born 1999), footballer for England
- Alan Clarke (1935–1990), film director
- Lewis Collins (1946–2013), actor, The Professionals
- Elvis Costello (born 1954), singer/songwriter - lived in Birkenhead
- Alex Cox (born 1954), filmmaker and author
- Daniel Craig (born 1968), actor, born in neighbouring Chester but grew up on the Wirral

== D ==
- Peter Davenport (born 1961), footballer
- Dickie Davies (1928–2023), presenter
- Matt Dawson (born 1972), rugby player and TV personality
- John Deakin (1912-1972), photographer
- Dixie Dean (1907–1980), footballer
- Mike Dean (born 1968), football referee
- Louise Delamere (born 1969), actress
- Lottie Dod (1871–1960), Wimbledon tennis champion
- Robbie Davies (1949–2017), Olympic boxer

== E ==
- Helen Edmundson (born 1964), playwright, screenwriter and producer
- Taron Egerton (born 1989), actor
- Arthur Charles Evans (1916–2011), author, ex-PoW and ex-General Secretary of the Police Federation
- Lee Latchford Evans (born 1975), actor and singer with pop group Steps

== F ==
- Michael Farnworth (born 1959), British Columbia politician born in Bromborough
- Jenny Frost (born 1978), TV presenter and singer with Atomic Kitten
- Robbie Fowler (born 1975), Footballer

== G ==
- John Gorman (born 1936), singer with The Scaffold, presenter on Tiswas
- Roger Lancelyn Green (1918–1987), children's writer; lived at Poulton Hall in Poulton Lancelyn, Bebington
- Wilfred Grenfell (1865–1940), "Grenfell of Labrador"
- Miro Griffiths (born 1989), academic and activist

== H ==
- Tony Hall (born 1951), Baron Hall of Birkenhead; former Director-General of the BBC
- Emma Hamilton (1765–1815), mistress of Horatio Nelson
- Austin Healey (born 1973), rugby player
- Paul Heaton (born 1962), singer and songwriter for the Beautiful South
- Adrian Henri (1932–2000), poet and artist
- Dave Hickson (1929–2013), footballer
- Paul Hollywood (born 1966), baker and TV judge
- Malcolm Holmes (born 1960), musician
- Barry Horne (born 1962), ex-Everton and Wales footballer and captain
- Stephen Hough (born 1961), pianist
- Geoffrey Howe (1926–2015), Deputy Prime Minister, Chancellor of the Exchequer and Foreign Secretary (N.B. Associated through service as MP for Bebington
- Geoffrey Hughes (1944–2012), actor
- Shirley Hughes (1927–2022), children's author and illustrator
- Paul Humphreys (born 1960), musician, member of OMD
- Rita Hunter (1933–2001), Wagnerian soprano
- James Hype (born 1989), DJ, Producer

== I ==
- Andrew Irvine (1902–1924), Everest climber
- Eric Idle (born 1943), member of Monty Python; lived in Wallasey as a child

== J ==
- Glenda Jackson (1936–2023), actress and politician
- Megs Jenkins (1917–1998), actress

== K ==
- Miles Kane (born 1986), musician
- Lindsay Kemp (born 1938), dancer, actor and choreographer

== L ==
- Charlie Landsborough (born 1941), singer/songwriter
- Mark Leckey (born 1964), Turner Prize-winning artist
- Saunders Lewis (1893–1985), politician, playwright, poet and literary critic
- Phil Liggett (born 1943), cycling commentator
- Craig Lindfield (born 1988), professional football player
- Selwyn Lloyd (1904–1978), Conservative Party Secretary of State for Foreign and Commonwealth Affairs and Chancellor of the Exchequer
- Jackie Lomax (1944–2013), singer-songwriter
- Malcolm Lowry (1909–1957), writer
- Nigel Lythgoe (born 1949), producer and TV personality, best known for being a judge on Popstars

== M ==
- Justin Madders (born 1972), MP for Ellesmere Port and Neston
- Simon Mason (born 1973), rugby union player, played for Ireland and won the 1999 Heineken Cup with Ulster.
- Valerie Masterson (born 1937), opera singer
- Jason McAteer (born 1971), footballer
- Andy McCluskey (born 1959), musician, member of OMD
- Mike McGear (born 1944), photographer, musician, member of The Scaffold, brother of Paul McCartney
- Alison McGovern (born 1980), MP for Wirral South

== N ==
- Paul Nowak (born 1972), trade union leader
- Sally Nugent (born 1971), BBC journalist & presenter

== O ==
- Paul O'Grady (1955–2023), comedian and TV personality
- Wilfred Owen (1893–1918), one of the greatest poets of the First World War; grew up in Tranmere

== P ==
- Tom Palin (born 1974), painter
- John Peel (1939–2004), disc jockey and radio presenter
- Dom Phillips (1964–2022), journalist
- Dominic Purcell (born 1970), actor

== R ==
- Jan Ravens (born 1958), actress and impressionist
- Noel Rawsthorne (1929–2019), organist and composer
- Simon Rimmer (born 1963), celebrity chef
- Kate Robbins (born 1958), impressionist
- Ted Robbins (born 1955), comedian
- Amy Robbins (born 1971), actress
- Alan Rouse (1951–1986), climber
- Patricia Routledge (1929–2025), actress
- Maude Royden (1876–1956), suffragist and preacher
- Mike Rutherford (born 1950), guitarist with Genesis; went to boarding school in Hoylake
- Bill Ryder-Jones (born 1983), musician from West Kirby

== S ==
- Joanna Scanlan (born 1961), actor
- Cyril Scott (1879–1970), composer
- Lucy Sibbick, Oscar Winner
- FE Smith (1872–1930), Lord Chancellor
- Matthew Smith (born 1966), 80s computer game programmer
- Jay Spearing (born 1988), footballer
- Olaf Stapledon (1886–1950), writer; spent much of his life in West Kirby and Caldy, and many landscapes mentioned in his works can be identified
- Ralph Steadman (born 1936), artist
- Philip Wilson Steer (1860–1942), impressionist painter
- Ray Stubbs (born 1956), sports commentator

== T ==
- Jodie Taylor (born 1986), footballer
- David Thompson (born 1977), footballer
- Bill Tidy (1933–2023), cartoonist
- Philip Toosey (1904–1975), hero of the real Bridge on the River Kwai incident

== V ==
- Graham Vick (1953–2021), opera director and producer

== W ==
- Jonathan Walters (born 1983), Stoke City F.C. striker
- William Henry Webster (1850–1931), Church of England vicar and malacologist
- Andreas Whittam-Smith (born 1937), founder of the Independent
- Cliff Williams (born 1949), bassist for AC/DC
- Bethany Williamson (born 1999), trampoline gymnast
- Marty Willson-Piper (born 1958), guitarist for The Church
- Harold Wilson (1916–1995), Prime Minister - Head Boy of Wirral Grammar School
- Steve Wilson (born 1967), BBC football commentator
- Tim Wright (born 1967), computer games composer

== See also ==
- List of people from Merseyside
