= Paul Darke =

British academic, artist and disability rights activist

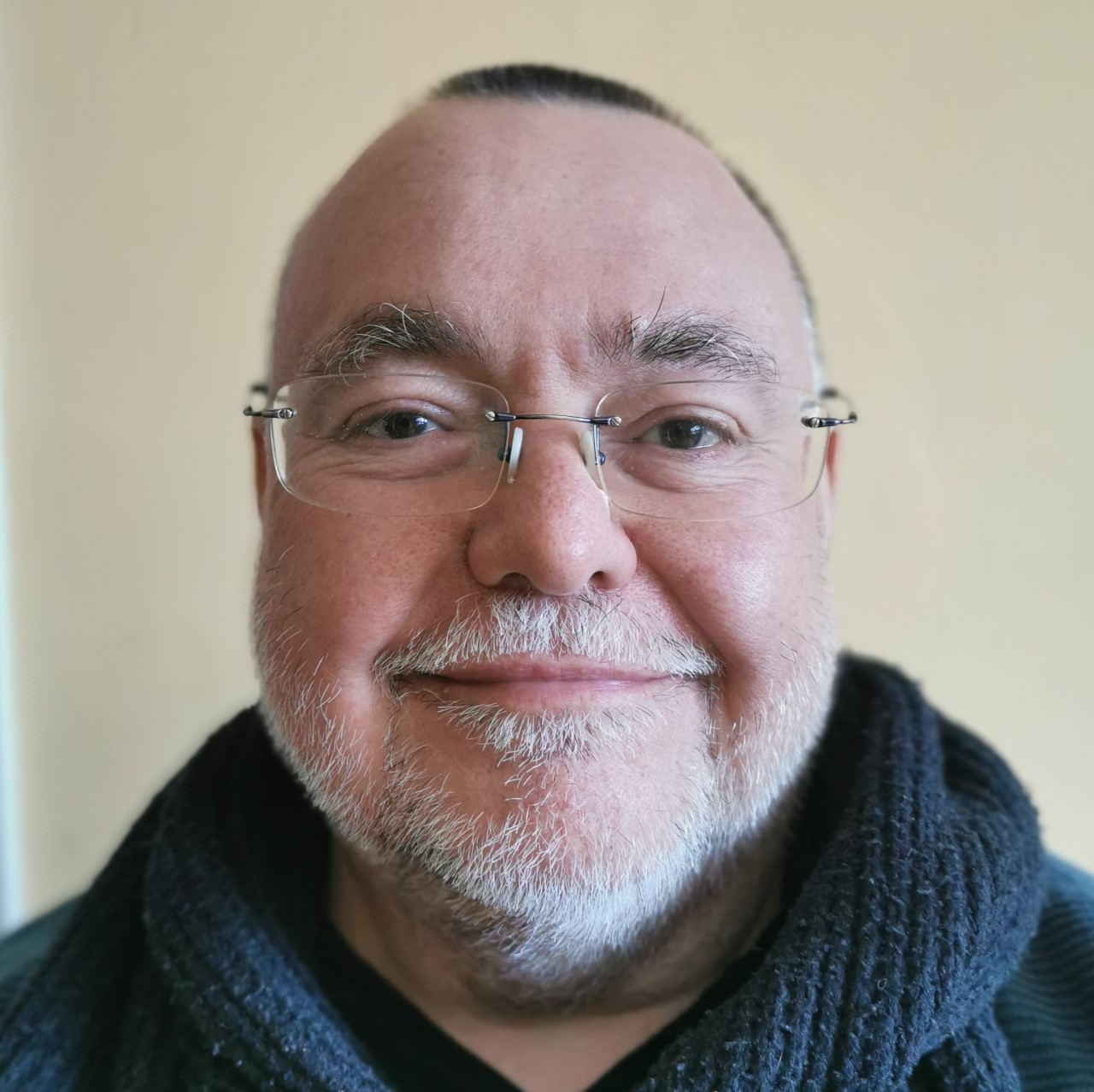
- Born: 1962 (age 63–64); Camberley
- Education: University of Warwick; Keele University; University of Wolverhampton
- Political party: Green Party of England and Wales
- Spouse: Claire Darke

Paul Darke CF (born 20 January 1962) is a British academic, artist, disability rights activist and whistleblower. Darke is an expert on disability in film and politics.

== Early life and education ==
Born in Frimley, Camberley, Darke attended special education boarding schools in Kent and Hampshire. He left the Shaftesbury Society school with little to no qualifications. In interviews, he credits an encounter with a fellow patient who was a psychologist during an unforeseen stay in hospital, to return to education. He also met his future wife, Claire, who was working there as a nurse.

After a few years out of education, he went to study at the then Wolverhampton Polytechnic at the age of 23, doing a computer access course for disabled people. He gained an MA in American Literature from Keele University. In 1999, he completed his PhD supervised by Richard Dyer on the portrayal of disabled people in British film at the University of Warwick.

== Career ==
=== Academia ===
Darke's research on disability representation in film has been highly influential both in academia and in broader society, making significant contributions to the discourse on disability in numerous academic texts.

In 1997, he received a Wingate Scholarship and a Winston Churchill Memorial Trust Scholarship to research disability and culture in western societies as well as exploring disability access to pilgrimages and shrines.

He invented the term 'normality drama', to describe a film genre which focuses on the life and experiences of a disabled protagonist. His theory is that normality drama uses abnormal— impaired—characters to deal with a perceived threat to the dominant social hegemony of normality. He has written about movies such as The Elephant Man and Whose Life is it Anyway, as well as television shows such as Family Guy calling Seth Macfalane's show a 'bold step forward in the canon of disability works'. He regularly contributes to broadcast media and features on a podcast on disability and film.

In 2023, Darke curated an exhibition at the Museum of the Home displaying toys that represent disability including characters from Ironside, The Simpsons and the Barbie collection. Darke is currently producing on three documentaries on 'disabled activism' with Miro Griffiths funded by the Leverhulme Trust.

In the Museums Journal, Darke wrote about the challenges facing disability representation:

“A disability pervades all spaces and times: the concern is the curation of its narrative. We have progressed beyond mere inclusion and access, and are into the complexities of power dynamics over control of its narratives. But the culture sector risks establishing an acceptable and unacceptable perspective – a potential impediment to the transformative influence that disability may bring in terms of rejuvenation and creativity. The challenge is to avoid homogenising the discourse into a sanitised narrative.”

In 2025, Darke was awarded University of Wolverhampton's Alumni Lifetime Achievement Award for his work as a disability rights pioneer transforming media, arts, and global cultural representation.

=== Art & Film ===
Darke is the founder and director of Outside Centre, a disability arts organisation based in Wolverhampton. It created the first ever Disability Film Festival in the United Kingdom. Outside Centre also worked to improve the health of local disabled people through a health and well-being programme.

In 2010, he produced 'Motion Disabled', an art installation using motion capture technology to represent real disabled people that was shown in over 20 countries. In previous roles, he held the role of director at the West Midlands Disability Arts Forum, and worked with Disability Arts in Shropshire for the 2012 Cultural Olympiad. He published a book about the London Paralympic Games from a disability art perspective. In addition, he helped launch the UK Disability History Month and has written Disability Equality Training for the United Nations. He is also a producer at the Invalid Carriage Museum.

In 2017, Darke created and organised Wolves in Wolves, the largest public art exhibition which took place in Wolverhampton.

He is a philatelist, holding the largest recorded collection of disability themed stamps in the world. In 2021, he published a book of stamps issued in the United Nations International Year of Disabled People in 1981, featuring critical essays by Darke, Miro Griffiths, Alison Wilde and Simon McKeown.

=== Disability Rights Activist ===
Darke is a significant voice advocating for disabled people's rights. Darke was active member of the Labour Party and an active supporter of Momentum and has hosted events at The World Transformed and the Labour Party Conference. He has previously called Labour politician David Blunkett 'in denial of his impairment as an experience' and has criticised the outsourcing of work capability assessments to Atos alongside Disabled People Against Cuts.

In June 2021 left the Labour Party and joined the Green Party due to, in his view: 'The Labour Party lacks any real commitment to disabled people; lacks originality and insight on any level'. In 2024, Darke stood as parliamentary candidate for the Green Party in Wolverhampton South East, gaining their highest-ever vote share in the constituency.

He has also worked with the European Network of Independent Living to support disabled people's human rights and submitted evidence to parliamentary committees. Consequently, Darke has been included on the list of the UKs most influential disabled people.

=== Whistleblower ===
In 2001, Darke ran a website criticising charity Leonard Cheshire to highlight their role in institutionalising those with disabilities and neglecting those in their care. He bought the domain name www.leonard-cheshire.com after resigning from the role of national advocacy officer and their public affairs committee. Among other things, he stated that 'the main reason you cease to be a Leonard Cheshire service user is death' and that charity donations would pay for 'private medical insurance of senior directors and management get-togethers costing £10,000 a weekend'.

After a heated debate on BBC Radio 4, as well as 50,000 hits on the website, Leonard Cheshire submitted a complaint to the World Intellectual Property Organization. WIPO ruled that Darke has no right or legitimate interest in the domain name; and that it has been registered and used by him in bad faith. Since this incident Darke has not been invited by the BBC to appear since.

As of today, the domain name is unused. Leonard Cheshire have subsequently changed their name to Leonard Cheshire Disability. The case is now citied in legal textbooks.

== Personal life ==
He is a wheelchair user who has spina bifida. His wife, Claire Darke, was the Mayor of Wolverhampton between 2019 and 2021, and they have a son Walker who was a former Member of Youth Parliament for the city; who stood in Tettenhall Wightwick for The Labour Party in the 2021 Wolverhampton City Council election. Darke was a batonbearer in the 2022 Commonwealth Games Queen's Baton Relay.
