= Ettingshall South and Spring Vale (ward) =

Coordinates: 52.553°N 2.107°W

Ettingshall South and Spring Vale is a ward of Wolverhampton City Council, West Midlands.

== Background ==
It was created in 2023 as a result of the Local Government Boundary Commission for England's recommendations that redrew the city's ward boundaries, with the new ward created from the former Spring Vale ward and part of Ettingshall ward. The new boundaries took effect from the May 2023 Council elections.

The ward borders the Blakenhall, Ettingshall North and Bilston South wards, as well as the Metropolitan Borough of Dudley to the south. It forms part of the Wolverhampton South East constituency.

== See also ==
- City of Wolverhampton Council elections
