= Colchester Borough Homes =

- Company type: Limited
- Founded: August 1, 2003
- Headquarters: Colchester, United Kingdom
- Services: Housing management
- Owner: Colchester Borough Council
- Website: www.cbhomes.org.uk

Colchester Borough Homes (CBH) is an arms-length management organisation (ALMO) that looks after around 7000 properties for Colchester Borough Council. It was set up in 2003 and now operates from six locations in and around Colchester. Its main office, Rowan House, is located in Colchester town centre.

== Management ==
CBH is managed by a board consisting of tenants/leaseholders, councillors and independents. There are 12 board members: four councillors, four tenants/leaseholders and four independent members.
