= Old Town Hall, Wolverhampton =

Municipal building in Wolverhampton, West Midlands, England

Old Town Hall
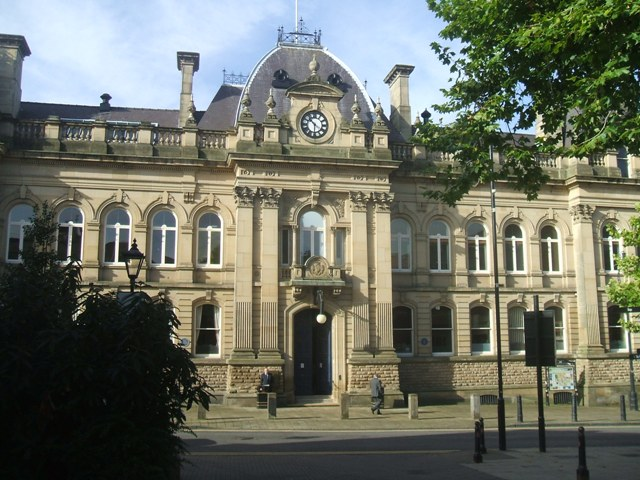
- Old Town Hall

- Shown in the West Midlands
- 52.5861°N 2.1304°W
- Location: North Street, Wolverhampton

History
- Built: 1871

Site notes
- Architect: Ernest Bates
- Architectural style: Renaissance style

Listed Building – Grade II
- Designated: 16 July 1949
- Reference no.: 1201845

The old Town Hall is a former municipal facility in North Street, Wolverhampton, West Midlands, United Kingdom. It is a Grade II listed building.

== History ==
The building was commissioned to replace an even earlier town hall located in High Green, now known as Queen Square, which had been built in around 1700. (Note: Some sources state that the original town hall was built in 1687 while other sources say it was built in 1703.)

The mayor, Henry Hartley Fowler, first introduced the initiative to build a new town hall in 1865. The site chosen for the new building was occupied by the Red Lion Inn which was purchased and demolished to facilitate the proposal. The new building was designed by Ernest Bates in the Renaissance style, built by a local contractor, Philip Horsman, and opened on 19 October 1871. The design of the building involved a 15-bay main frontage constructed of Cefn sandstone, with segmental-headed windows on the ground floor, round-headed windows on the first floor and pavilions at roof level. In the centre, with paired pilasters on either side, is the main entrance, and at first-floor level a stone balcony (originally linked to the Mayor's Parlour), which is decorated with the borough coat of arms. The clock, on the parapet above, was a timepiece by T. Cooke & Sons of York.

Inside, the main entrance led to a vestibule beyond which was an octagonal, domed central hall, providing access to the council chamber on the right, the session court to the left and the police court straight ahead. There were offices provided for the town clerk, treasurer, surveyor and other officers of the corporation, as well as for the Recorder and other officials and users of the courts. At basement level were 34 cells for prisoners, and to the rear a police barracks and exercise yards for the prisoners.

As well as being the borough's courthouse, the building was the meeting place of the local municipal borough council, which secured county borough status in 1889. The Queen Mother visited the town hall and met with civic leaders on 3 June 1969.

Following the implementation of re-organisation associated with the Local Government Act 1972, the building briefly became the headquarters of Wolverhampton Metropolitan Borough Council, until the council moved to Wolverhampton Civic Centre in 1978. The old town hall then ceased to be used as a municipal facility and instead became the home of the Wolverhampton Law Courts. After Wolverhampton Crown Court moved to the new Wolverhampton Combined Court Centre in Pipers Row in 1991, the old town hall operated primarily as the local home of the magistrates courts. A proposal for the magistrates courts to move to a new complex in Darlington Street was considered in 2010, but subsequently abandoned as uneconomic, and so the building remains the home of the "Black Country Magistrates Court".

Works of art inside the building include a large stature of the first mayor, George Benjamin Thorneycroft, which was sculpted by Thomas Thornycroft in 1851, and later installed within an alcove at the head of the staircase.
