= 1975 Wolverhampton Metropolitan Borough Council election =

1975 UK local government election

The 1975 Wolverhampton Metropolitan Borough Council election was held on 1 May 1975. The Labour Party retained control of the Wolverhampton Metropolitan Borough Council.

The 1975 elections were the first "one third" elections since Wolverhampton became a Metropolitan Borough and held "all out" elections in 1973, although a by-election had been held in Wednesfield Heath following the death of Cyril Squire in which the Labour Party gained the seat from the Conservatives, thus changing the composition of the Council since 1973.

The 1975 elections were contested by the Wolverhampton Association of Ratepayers (WAR) who succeeded in gaining only one seat. Two seats were contested in the Eastfield ward following the resignation of Peter Ray.

The composition of the council prior to the election was:

- Labour 41
- Conservative 19

The composition of the council following the election was:

- Labour 38
- Conservative 21
- WAR 1

== Ward results ==
Bilston East
Party	Candidate	Votes	%	±%
Labour	J Geraghty	839		
Conservative	W J Allen	280		
WAR	T Smith	258		
Majority		559		
Labour hold		Swing		

Bilston North
Party	Candidate	Votes	%	±%
Conservative	N J Speakman	1203		
Labour	D R Davies	815		
WAR	F T Cooper	226		
Majority		338		
Conservative gain from Labour		Swing		

Blakenhall
Party	Candidate	Votes	%	±%
Conservative	Mrs S J L Shaw	1655		
Labour	J E Hackwood	860		
WAR	H F Ryan	779		
Liberal	P K Jones	265		
Majority		795		
Conservative hold		Swing		

Bushbury
Party	Candidate	Votes	%	±%
Labour	R Mitchell	814		
WAR	C J Reynolds	452		
Conservative	W Hillier	409		
National Front	J T Eyre	127		
Majority		362		
Labour hold		Swing		

Eastfield
Party	Candidate	Votes	%	±%
Labour	Mrs L Richards	946		
Labour	F S Smith	910		
Conservative	P A Moseley	608		
Conservative	Mrs R M Smith	575		
WAR	M Griffiths	366		
National Front	R Davison	219		
Communist	G J Barnsby	77		
Labour hold		Swing		

Ettingshall
Party	Candidate	Votes	%	±%
Labour	A Storer	786		
Conservative	M S Pritchard	316		
WAR	G Dicken	191		
Communist	D Hamilton	59		
Majority		470		
Labour hold		Swing		

Graiseley
Party	Candidate	Votes	%	±%
Labour	Mrs N Jones	1360		
Conservative	R Dorsett	1258		
WAR	Mrs E Powell	400		
Majority		102		
Labour hold		Swing		

Low Hill
Party	Candidate	Votes	%	±%
Labour	C Laws	856		
Conservative	Mrs C Tuckley	356		
WAR	J Green	240		
Majority		500		
Labour hold		Swing		

Merry Hill
Party	Candidate	Votes	%	±%
Conservative	R Hart	2642		
WAR	R Anslow	1420		
Labour	E Pritchard	868		
Majority		1222		
Conservative hold		Swing		

Oxley
Party	Candidate	Votes	%	±%
WAR	F W Simpson	1323		
Conservative	F C N Haley	1034		
Labour	J Fullwood	750		
Liberal	Mrs A A Lewis	203		
National Front	S P McNally	112		
Majority		289		

WAR gain from Labour

Park
Party	Candidate	Votes	%	±%
Conservative	Mrs M W Hodson	1779		
Labour	C Dougherty	544		
Liberal	R W Gray	508		
WAR	C J Crane	320		
National Front	J K Thomas	156		
Majority		1275		
Conservative hold		Swing		

Parkfield
Party	Candidate	Votes	%	±%
Labour	A E Steventon	1097		
Conservative	P H Claxton	347		
WAR	B A Aston	202		
Communist	M D Peckmore	24		
Majority		750		
Labour hold		Swing		

Penn
Party	Candidate	Votes	%	±%
Conservative	Mrs P Bradley	2799		
WAR	F W Slater	1472		
Liberal	F M Hemsley	550		
Labour	L F Moore	349		
Majority		1327		
Conservative hold		Swing		

St Peters
Party	Candidate	Votes	%	±%
Labour	B Dass	1441		
Conservative	Mrs G M Hodson	829		
WAR	Mrs H W Reynolds	336		
National Front	P R Kane	260		
Majority		612		
Labour hold		Swing		

Spring Vale
Party	Candidate	Votes	%	±%
Labour	A Garner	1452		
Conservative	Mrs P Atkinson	658		
National Front	K Shaw	403		
Liberal	W Leech	397		
WAR	R Thomas	232		
Majority		794		
Labour hold		Swing		

Tettenhall Regis
Party	Candidate	Votes	%	±%
Conservative	Mrs M T Comport	1886		
WAR	L N Birch	1460		
Liberal	L Maclean	558		
Labour	J E Morland	204		
Majority		428		
Conservative hold		Swing		

Tettenhall Wightwick
Party	Candidate	Votes	%	±%
Conservative	E G L Pearce	2281		
WAR	S J W Smith	706		
Labour	Mrs S Selkirk	409		
Liberal	Mrs M E Millar	368		
Majority		1575		
Conservative hold		Swing		

Wednesfield Heath
Party	Candidate	Votes	%	±%
Conservative	H L Turner	1510		
Liberal	J F Porter	746		
Labour	R J Garner	739		
WAR	R K Hoare	306		
Communist	J Barr	35		
Majority		764		
Conservative hold		Swing		

Wednesfield North
Party	Candidate	Votes	%	±%
Labour	S Reynolds	1089		
Conservative	R Squires	992		
WAR	Mrs M Cartwright	349		
Majority		97		
Labour hold		Swing		

Wednesfield South
Party	Candidate	Votes	%	±%
Conservative	A D Griffiths	1199		
Labour	Mrs E D Jevons	692		
WAR	W Habberley	197		
National Front	Mrs D P Elsner	144		
Majority		507		
Conservative gain from Labour		Swing		
