= Claire Darke =

British politician

Councillor Claire Darke MBE
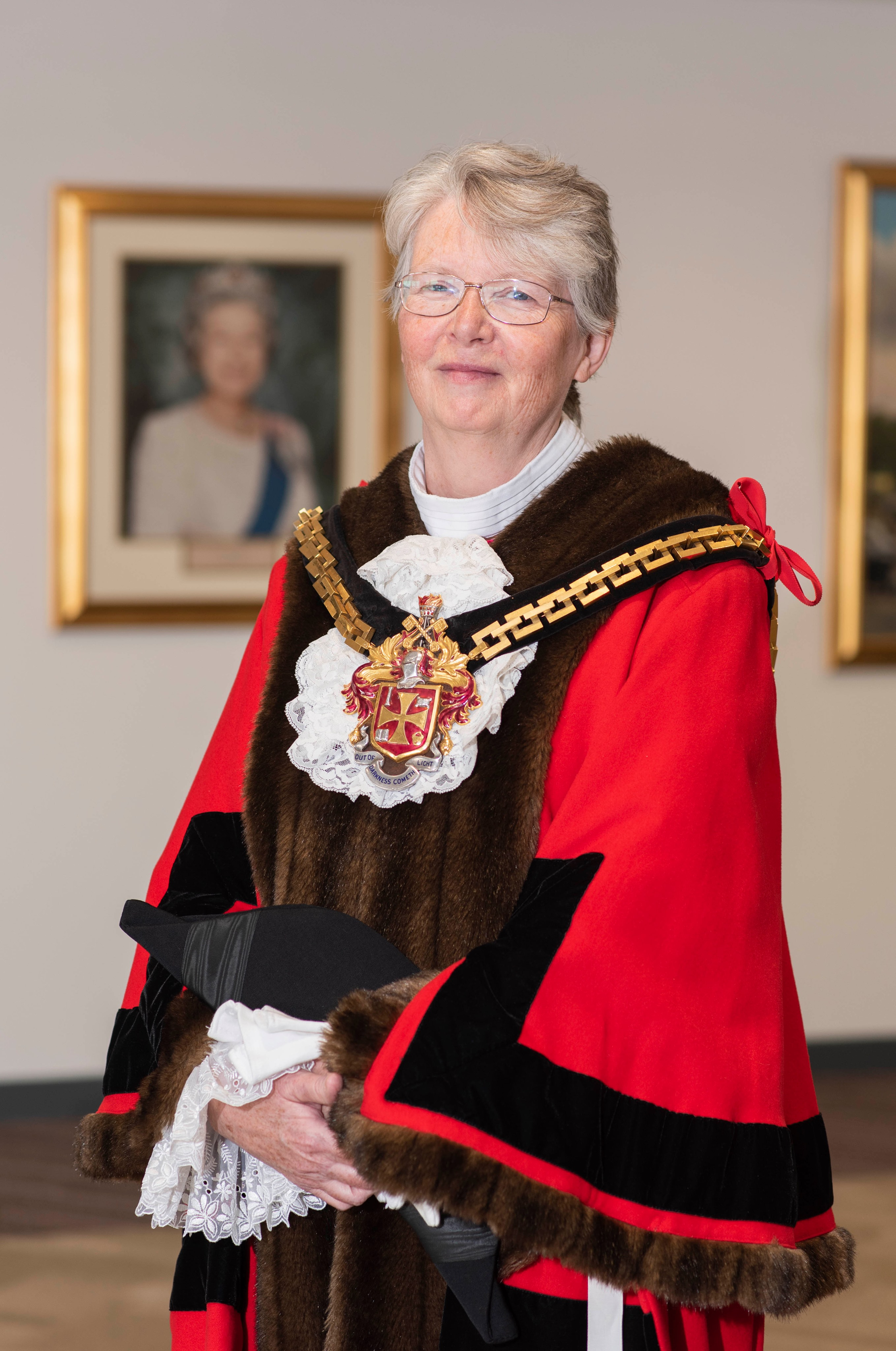
- Darke as Mayor of Wolverhampton

Mayor of Wolverhampton
- In office 16 May 2019 – 19 May 2021
- Deputy: Greg Brackenridge
- Leader: Ian Brookfield
- Preceded by: Phil Page
- Succeeded by: Greg Brackenridge

Deputy Mayor of Wolverhampton
- In office 17 May 2018 – 16 May 2019
- Mayor: Phil Page
- Leader: Ian Brookfield
- Preceded by: Phil Page
- Succeeded by: Greg Brackenridge

Member of Wolverhampton City Council for Park Ward
- Incumbent
- Assumed office 1 May 2008

Personal details
- Born: Stratford-upon-Avon, Warwickshire, England
- Party: Independent (2024–present)
- Other political affiliations: Labour (2011–2024); Liberal Democrats (2008–2011); Independent (before 2008)
- Spouse: Paul Darke
- Education: University of Wolverhampton; University of Warwick
- Known for: Artist of Wolves in Wolves
- Website: Mayor of Wolverhampton

Claire Darke MBE is a British politician who served as Mayor of Wolverhampton from 2019 to 2021, holding the distinction of being the longest continuously serving female mayor in the city's history. First elected the councillor for Park Ward in 2008 as a Liberal Democrat before switching to the Labour Party in 2011, she currently serves as an independent, having resigned from the Labour Party in 2024.

Darke was appointed Member of the Order of the British Empire in the 2025 New Year Honours.

== Early life ==
Born in Stratford-upon-Avon, Claire Darke moved to Woking, Surrey at a young age. She attended local comprehensive schools, St Dunstan’s and St John the Baptist, but left with few formal qualifications.

She did not get a job when she first left school – opting instead to stay at home to assist her mother in nursing an elderly grandmother. Darke later took on various jobs, including positions at the Department of Social Security, Pickering & Phillips dental practice, and manufacturing giant James Walker's Lion Works. During this period, she also pursued evening classes in first aid with St John's Ambulance and trained as a nurse, eventually working in the orthopaedic ward Frimley Park Hospital.

It was on this ward that she met her future husband, Paul Darke. Being newly married and living in a small flat with her father-in-law and with house prices in Surrey being so high, they looked further afield for somewhere to live. Darke eventually moving to Bilston after Claire securing a job as a live-in warden of a sheltered housing scheme for elderly people. She admits to finding the strong Black Country dialect a challenge to understand as she settled in to life in the region.

She then got in-house training at Bilston Community College and completed a Diploma in Higher Education (DiPHE) at the then Wolverhampton Polytechnic. This allowed her to progress onto a degree course as a mature student.

She graduated from the University of Wolverhampton in 1992 with a BA (Hons) in English and Spanish. After undertaking further studies, including Deaf Studies, this led to her undertaking a Certificate of Qualification in Social Work (CQSW) at University of Warwick. She has lived in Wolverhampton for more than 40 years. While researching her family history, she discovered her Irish heritage. In 2022, she was nominated for the Lifetime Achievement Award at the inaugural University of Wolverhampton's Alumni Awards.

== Political career ==
=== Entry into politics ===
Darke first entered politics in 2007 as an independent candidate for Park ward in the Wolverhampton City Council elections, driven by her opposition to the closure of the Compton Baths swimming pool. Although she only received 110 votes, the incumbent lost the seat by 136 votes. Her son also appeared on Newsround to bring attention to the issue.

Impressed by her campaign, and being the only political party to support her campaign, she was chosen as the candidate for the Liberal Democrats (UK) in the 2008 Wolverhampton City Council election. She won with 42% of the vote, and increased the Liberal Democrat majority. The Liberal Democrats and Conservatives formed an alliance to take control of Wolverhampton Council until 2010.

=== Transition to the Labour Party ===
In December 2010, Darke resigned from the Liberal Democrat-Conservative coalition of Wolverhampton City Council, because of her opposition to the United Kingdom government austerity programme saying: 'the ideological driven policies of the Conservatives to slash and burn our great city's services must not be tolerated'. She was supported by chairs of the Wolverhampton South West and East Lib Dem parties.

This caused the Wolverhampton Labour Group to take control, with a majority of 1. This was the first City Council in the UK where a local coalition failed and disillusionment with the coalition was apparent after the 2010 United Kingdom general election and formation of the national Conservative-Liberal Democrat coalition. She remained a Liberal Democrat, independent of the coalition until joining the Labour Party in March 2011 where she said that the Liberal Democrats "had become 'at one' with Conservative ideology and no longer represent the ideals of the party I originally joined".

As a Labour Party candidate, she has gained more than 50% of the vote in four consecutive elections from 2012 onwards.

She held various roles within Wolverhampton City Council including Equalities Champion, Chair of the Petitions Committee, and Chair of Health Scrutiny Panel, where she undertook a Scrutiny Review of Infant Mortality. She was then the Cabinet Member for Education which saw Wolverhampton's Adult Education service rated as 'Outstanding' by Ofsted. She oversaw extra teacher training and more than £2 million invested in improving schools. In 2017, she approved of the creation of a new learning quarter in Wolverhampton.

=== Mayoralty ===
Darke became Deputy Mayor in May 2018, and was appointed Mayor of Wolverhampton on 15 May 2019. During her tenure, she focused on recognising the contribution of women and prevention of suicide and self harm. In her opening address, she stated that she is the 161st Mayor of Wolverhampton, but only the 10th woman. In her role, she has created the University of Wolverhampton Alumni Mayoral Scholarship Fund – a new venture to support local people into higher education. She also supported the Wolverhampton Suicide Prevention Stakeholders Forum to form into a charity and raised more than £10,000 for the forum in her mayoral term.

She is an avid supporter of Wolverhampton's role in UNESCO's Global Network of Learning Cities and has spoken of her pride in representing the City as Mayor during the COVID-19 pandemic in the United Kingdom. In August 2020, Darke was featured alongside local community groups in a case study on practices aimed at fostering regenerative development in ‘left behind places’.

As one of her final acts as Mayor, she was instrumental in obtaining a Blue Plaque in memory of British immigrant rights activist Paulette Wilson, a member of the Windrush Generation. The plaque was launched with campaigners including Patrick Vernon at the Wolverhampton Heritage Centre. The Centre is a cornerstone of the area’s local Caribbean community and was formerly the constituency office of Enoch Powell where the infamous Rivers of Blood speech was written.

=== Resignation from the Labour Party ===
In June 2024, Darke resigned from the Labour Party, expressing disillusionment with the party's direction under Keir Starmer. In her resignation letter, she criticized the party's stance on austerity, Brexit, and the Israel-Palestine conflict, particularly its position on Gaza, which she described as "morally wrong and ignores the suffering of the Palestinian people." Darke also raised concerns about an increasingly autocratic culture within the party and called Labour's values as an "inexcusable abandonement of the working class". Her resignation was part of a broader trend of disillusionment among Labour members, particularly those who were critical of the party's shift to the right and its approach to international and domestic issues. After her resignation, Darke continued to serve as an independent councillor for Park Ward.

== Political views ==
Darke has written extensively on abortion and is a self-declared feminist. In Swimming against the Tide: Feminist Dissent on the Issue of Abortion, which is a pivotal book in shaping discourse around anti-abortion feminism, she wrote a chapter titled "Abortion and Disability: Is That Different?" where she states:

Feminism is, by its very nature, about the validation of difference and Otherness - the female as 'the first step on the road along abnormality'. All I am doing is arguing that we go down that road a little further and pick up a few more allies and friends; if for no other reason than the fact that half of the disabled community are our sisters.

Darke is a supporter of Jeremy Corbyn, the former leader of the British Labour Party. She was one of the first councillors in the West Midlands to support Corbyn's successful run in the 2015 Labour Party (UK) leadership election, and continued to support his leadership in the 2016 Labour Party (UK) leadership election. She supported the campaign to save the British Department Store, Beatties. As Cabinet Member for Education, she underlined the importance of Music as part of a young person's education and criticised the Conservative Government's austerity measures and cuts to education. In the early days of Boris Johnson's Conservative Government, she criticised the new government Town of the Year competition, after it was launched in Wolverhampton, a place that has been a city since 2000:

We have been a city for 19 years and they need to catch up. Are they that out of touch that they did not bother to look it up?

In late 2021, she called for the leader of City of Wolverhampton Council Ian Brookfield to stand down due to "concerns that the culture of Labour councillors bullying and harassing one another continues, with it seems, the active support of the leader".

She is a supporter of LGBT rights. During her reign as Mayor, the rainbow flag was raised at Wolverhampton Civic Centre for LGBT History Month. She is also a supporter of the UK's first transgender rapper, Nate Ethan.

Following the announcement that Ukraine would not host the Eurovision Song Contest 2023, Darke proposed Wolverhampton to hold the contest. She referenced the city's proud musical heritage with prominent acts such as Led Zeppelin, Slade, Beverley Knight and Liam Payne, as well as Wolverhampton's commitment to being a diverse, multicultural, and inclusive city. Her call to personally invite Liam Payne to reunite One Direction for a one-off show to support refugees from the 2022 Russian invasion of Ukraine garnered significant media attention.

After the death of Elizabeth II, she described a previous visit to Buckingham Palace as energising a community spirit in her to enact positive change. She encouraged Charles III to visit Wolverhampton and embrace Wolverhampton as a centre for a brighter future of 'more equitable internationalism'.

== Art ==
Darke was selected to design and decorate a Wolf sculpture as part of the local arts project Wolves in Wolves. The wolf design is dedicated to all those from Wolverhampton who died in World War One. She was formerly the Secretary of the Wolverhampton Civil and Historical Society, where she helped get more blue plaques for the city and its surroundings, including one for Wolverhampton's first female doctor, Dr Ina Lochhead McNeill.

In 2020, she co-curated an art exhibition at Wolverhampton Art Gallery titled Wolverhampton and Me about family heritage. Following this, Darke has curated exhibitions at the Museum of the Home, London and Wolverhampton Art Gallery about 'Disability and the Home: Toys and Games' and consequently wrote a book exploring the representation of disability in toys and popular culture, examining how these portrayals shape societal attitudes and reflect broader narratives of diversity, inclusion, and discrimination.

In 2024, Claire Darke painted one of the Wolves in Wolves, to celebrate the Wolverhampton's role in the 2022 Commonwealth Games that is now placed in Wolverhampton Art Gallery.

== Personal life ==
She is married to academic and disability rights activist Paul Darke. Their son, Walker, is a former Member of Youth Parliament for the city, who stood in Tettenhall Wightwick for the Labour Party in the 2021 Wolverhampton City Council election. In 2023, Walker was included in the Forbes 30 Under 30 Europe for Social Impact, recognising his leadership as the lead author of the United Nations' Roadmap to Carbon Neutrality for Europe, North America and Central Asia.

Darke was part of the 2022 Commonwealth Games Queen's Baton Relay where she supported Paul as a baton bearer.

In 2024, Darke was inducted into University of Wolverhampton's Alumni Hall of Fame.

Darke was appointed Member of the Order of the British Empire in the 2025 New Year Honours for services to Local Government, to Disability and to Suicide Prevention.
