= Wolverhampton Combined Court Centre =

Judicial building in Wolverhampton, England

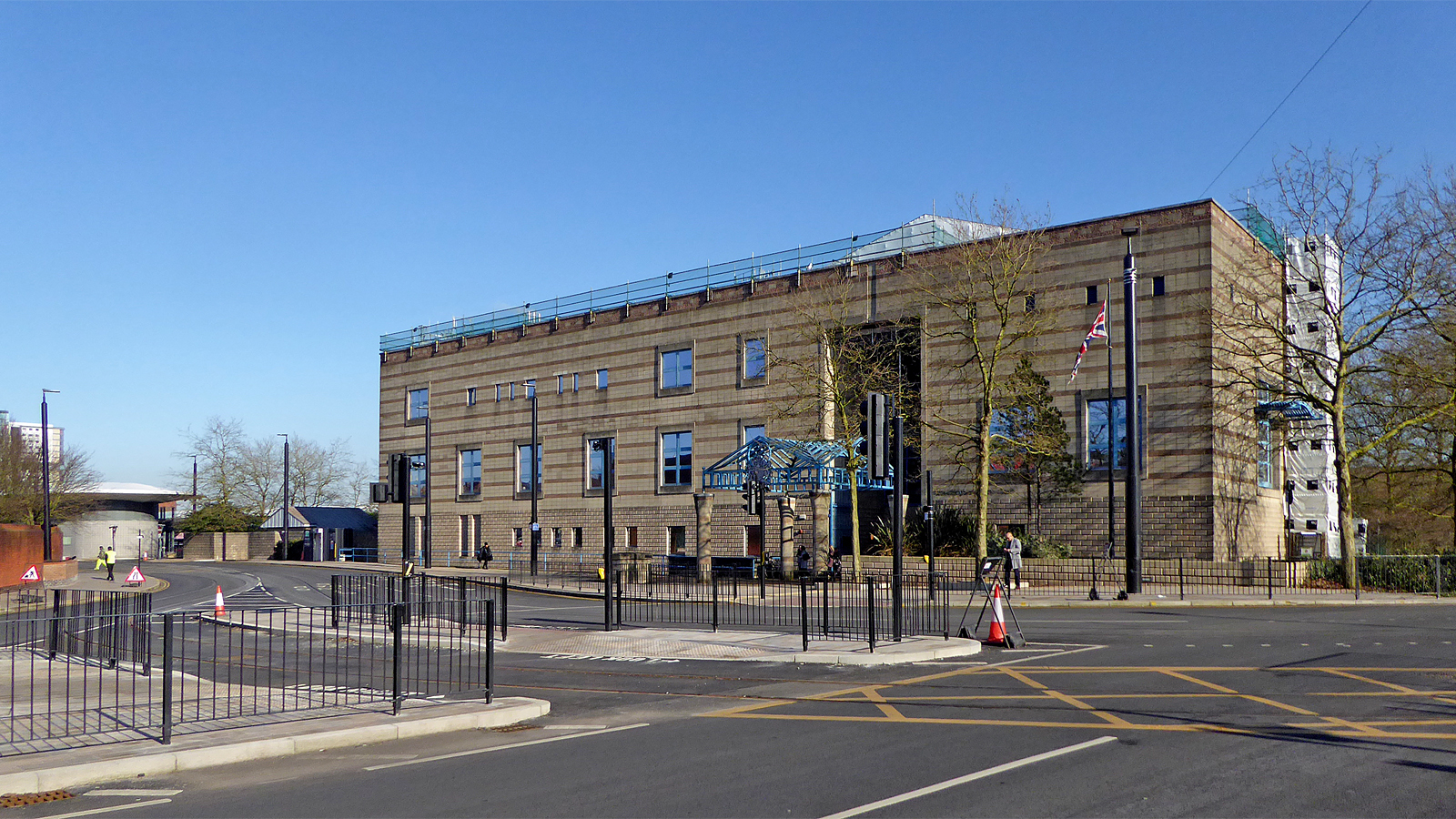
- Wolverhampton Combined Court Centre

- Shown in the West Midlands
- 52.5844°N 2.1222°W
- Location: Pipers Row, Wolverhampton

History
- Built: 1990

Site notes
- Architect(s): Norman and Dawbarn
- Architectural style: Modernist style

The Wolverhampton Combined Court Centre is a Crown Court venue, which deals with criminal cases, as well as a County Court, which deals with civil cases, in Pipers Row, Wolverhampton, England.

== History ==
Until the early 1990s, all criminal court hearings were held in the Old Town Hall in North Street. However, as the number of court cases in Birmingham grew, it became necessary to commission a more modern courthouse for criminal matters. It was also intended that the building would become the venue for civil cases hearings, which had previously taken place in the old Assembly Rooms in Queen Street. The site selected by the Lord Chancellor's Department, on the east side of Pipers Row, had been occupied by a piece of land known in the 19th century as "Tomkys Yard" which had been occupied by a furniture store owned by Alexander Sloan & Company in the early 20th century.

The new building was designed by Norman and Dawbarn in the Modernist style, built in alternating bands of light and dark brown brick at a cost of £9.2 million, and was completed in 1990. The design involved an asymmetrical main frontage of nine bays facing onto Pipers Row. The left hand section of six bays was fenestrated by large casement windows on the first floor and by an irregular pattern of windows on the ground and second floors. The central section was formed by a large recess giving access to a full-height atrium fronted by a single-storey steel-framed canopy which projected forward. The right hand section of two bays was fenestrated in a similar style to the left hand section. Internally, the building was laid out to accommodate ten courtrooms.

Notable cases included trial and conviction of four members of the rock band, The Stone Roses, in October 1990, for criminal damage to the offices of their former record company, the trial and conviction of Sheila Jones, in November 2011, for the murder of her grandmother, and the trial and conviction of Ayman Aziz, in December 2018, for the rape and murder of a 14-year-old girl in a Wolverhampton park.
