= 1973 Wolverhampton Metropolitan Borough Council election =

1973 UK local government election

May 10, 1973	1975 →

All 60 Seats 31 seats needed for a majority
	First party	Second party	Third party
Party	Labour	Conservative	Liberal
Seats won	40	20	0
Popular vote	66,860	58,175	10,270
Percentage	48.29%	42.02%	7.42%
	Fourth party	Fifth party	Sixth party
Party	National Front	TUUF	Ind. Labour Party
Seats won	0	0	0
Popular vote	1.232	692	636
Percentage	0.89%	0.5%	0.46%
	Seventh party
Party	Communist
Seats won	0
Popular vote	593
Percentage	0.43%

The first elections to the Wolverhampton Metropolitan Borough Council were held on 10 May 1973.

== Background ==
The metropolitan district was one of the new authorities created by the Local Government Act 1972, which completely reorganised local administration in England and Wales. The new district, one of seven in the West Midlands, had an identical area to the existing County Borough of Wolverhampton. The first council was elected as a "shadow authority", with the reorganisation coming into effect in the following year on 1 April 1974. Subsequent to the election the shadow council successfully petitioned for a royal charter granting borough status, becoming Wolverhampton Metropolitan Borough Council.

== Elections ==
At this first election all 60 councillors were elected, there being three councillors in each of the 20 wards. In an anomaly of the usual procedure for local elections, the candidate in first place was elected for 5 years, the candidate in second place for 3 years and the candidate in third place for 2 years. This was to allow for the "shadow" year of 1974 when the Metropolitan Borough Council was operating in shadow of the County Borough. From 1975 elections were by thirds with one councillor retiring in each ward.

Following the election the Labour Party had overall control of the council with 40 councillors to the Conservatives 20. Following the final county borough election held in 1972 the two parties had held 40 seats each on the 80 member council.

== Election results ==
The following councillors were returned in their corresponding wards:

Bilston East
Party	Candidate	Votes	%	±%
Labour	D Turner (1st)	1891	34.02%	
Labour	T H Larkin (2nd)	1786	32.13%	
Labour	Mrs H Brown (3rd)	1603	28.84%	
Conservative	A G Cooper	278	5%	
Turnout		5558	23.9	

Bilston North
Party	Candidate	Votes	%	±%
Labour	P R Richards (1st)	1281	20.11%	
Labour	R Reynolds (2nd)	1137	17.85%	
Labour	R Davies (3rd)	1125	17.66%	
Conservative	W L Hughes	994	15.61%	
Conservative	R A M Marshall	932	14.63%	
Conservative	L S Draisey	900	14.13%	
Turnout		6369	23.9	

Blakenhall
Party	Candidate	Votes	%	±%
Conservative	J Carpenter (1st)	2070	20.66%	
Conservative	Mrs J E Shore (2nd)	1996	19.92%	
Conservative	Mrs J L Shaw (3rd)	1992	19.88%	
Labour	J Hackwood	1389	13.86%	
Labour	G R Johnson	1335	13.32%	
Labour	Bishan Dass	1238	12.36%	
Turnout		10020	37.8	

Bushbury
Party	Candidate	Votes	%	±%
Labour	Mrs J Beddoes (1st)	1069	29.34%	
Labour	J A W Bird (2nd)	1055	28.96%	
Labour	E Mitchell (3rd)	998	27.4%	
Conservative	W Hillier	361	9.91%	
National Front	W A Murfin	160	4.39%	
Turnout		3643	18.9	

Eastfield
Party	Candidate	Votes	%	±%
Labour	Ken Purchase (1st)	1452	31.01%	
Labour	P Ray (2nd)	1260	26.91%	
Labour	Mrs L Richards (3rd)	1235	26.38%	
Conservative	Mrs E H Allen	387	8.27%	
National Front	R Davison	204	4.36%	
Communist	G J Barnsby	144	3.08%	
Turnout		4682	19.1	

Ettingshall
Party	Candidate	Votes	%	±%
Labour	E W Bold (1st)	1281	29.1%	
Labour	Mrs C Durham (2nd)	1091	24.78%	
Labour	A Storer (3rd)	1021	23.19%	
Conservative	W J Allen	458	10.4%	
Conservative	G D Phillips	455	10.34%	
Communist	F W Reeves	96	2.18%	
Turnout		4402	19.1	

Graiseley
Party	Candidate	Votes	%	±%
Labour	A G Barratt (1st)	1500	18.7%	
Labour	Mrs V A Fletcher (2nd)	1390	17.33%	
Labour	Mrs N Jones (3rd)	1367	17.04%	
Conservative	W H Etwell	1305	16.27%	
Conservative	R Dorsett	1258	15.69%	
Conservative	R J Thomas	1200	15.07%	
Turnout		8020	35.1	

Low Hill
Party	Candidate	Votes	%	±%
Labour	D Hickmott (1st)	1026	31.32%	
Labour	Mrs W F K Reynolds (2nd)	1011	30.86%	
Labour	A C Laws (3rd)	966	29.49%	
Conservative	A Dixon	213	6.5%	
Communist	G Dorrance	60	1.83%	
Turnout		3276	12.7	

Merry Hill
Party	Candidate	Votes	%	±%
Conservative	W Clarke (1st)	2362	28.22%	
Conservative	J G Blackburn (2nd)	2329	27.83%	
Conservative	Robert Hart (3rd)	2119	25.32%	
Labour	Mrs M Everett	858	10.25%	
Labour	G Turner	702	8.39%	
Turnout		8370	27.9	

Oxley
Party	Candidate	Votes	%	±%
Labour	K Staves (1st)	1229	20.03%	
Labour	R Haynes (2nd)	1121	18.27%	
Labour	N Fryer (3rd)	1071	17.45%	
Conservative	H J Burton	879	14.32%	
Conservative	G Bangham	819	13.35%	
Conservative	P Withers	732	11.93%	
National Front	D E Foster	286	4.66%	
Turnout		6137	27.4	

Park
Party	Candidate	Votes	%	±%
Conservative	W J Morrison (1st)	1568	20.14%	
Conservative	Mrs M S Machin (2nd)	1565	20.1%	
Conservative	Mrs M W Hodson (3rd)	1523	19.56%	
Labour	Dr P Young	584	7.5%	
Labour	W Bruce	524	6.73%	
Labour	S G Stockley von Statzer	504	6.47%	
Liberal	Mrs W Lundgren	457	5.87%	
Liberal	R Gray	441	5.66%	
Liberal	K R Aithal	379	4.87%	
National Front	D G Gorton	240	3.08%	
Turnout		7785	34.5	

Parkfield
Party	Candidate	Votes	%	±%
Labour	G Howells (1st)	1298		
Labour	H E Lace (2nd)	1287		
Labour	A E Steventon (3rd)	1118		
Conservative	B C Johnson	397		
Conservative	C Lenton	272		
Conservative	B Wood	240		
Communist	R A Millington	78		

Penn
Party	Candidate	Votes	%	±%
Conservative	G A Bickley (1st)	2669		
Conservative	D J Rutherford (2nd)	2653		
Conservative	P Bradley (3rd)	2304		
Liberal	J Wernick	1961		
Liberal	A Robinson	1642		
Liberal	T D Bamford	1522		
Labour	Mrs M Garner	285		
Labour	D Aulton	277		

St Peters
Party	Candidate	Votes	%	±%
Labour	I G Claymore (1st)	1866		
Labour	Mr J James (2nd)	1533		
Labour	S R Sharma (3rd)	1211		
TUUF	G S Bains	692		
ILP	G Carter	636		
Conservative	H Cohen	620		
Conservative	E M Gibbs	488		
Conservative	B Thomas	432		
National Front	P Kane	242		
Communist	D Hamilton	106		

Spring Vale
Party	Candidate	Votes	%	±%
Labour	S Martin (1st)	2188		
Labour	N G Davies (2nd)	2040		
Labour	A Garner (3rd)	1933		
Conservative	Mrs P E Atkinson	413		

Tettenhall Regis
Party	Candidate	Votes	%	±%
Conservative	S O Morton (1st)	1683		
Conservative	Mrs D M Seiboth (2nd)	1666		
Conservative	Mrs T M Comport (3rd)	1586		
Liberal	Larry Mclean	1213		
Liberal	H C Marshall	1027		
Liberal	M E Millar	950		
Labour	J M Smith	300		
Labour	R F Ilsley	285		
Labour	B Evans	278		

Tettenhall Wightwick
Party	Candidate	Votes	%	±%
Conservative	G R Watson (1st)	1897		
Conservative	P G Snell (2nd)	1882		
Conservative	E G L Pearce (3rd)	1862		
Liberal	H Wright	677		
Labour	K P Jarrad	525		
Labour	W O Reilly	515		
Labour	R S Willett	493		

Wednesfield Heath
Party	Candidate	Votes	%	±%
Labour	H Turner (1st)	1265		
Conservative	C T Squire (2nd)	1239		
Conservative	A Griffiths (3rd)	1226		
Labour	R Garner	1198		
Conservative	F J Wadsworth	1176		
Labour	G Hicken	1171		

Wednesfield North
Party	Candidate	Votes	%	±%
Labour	J A Morey (1st)	1649		
Labour	L Horton (2nd)	1623		
Labour	S H Reynolds (3rd)	1554		
Conservative	G H Parker	815		
Conservative	W J Curtiss	732		
Conservative	Mrs J M Curtiss	725		
Communist	A Barr	109		

Wednesfield South
Party	Candidate	Votes	%	±%
Labour	Mrs C M Nicholls (1st)	1380		
Labour	J F Torrington (2nd)	1296		
Labour	Mrs E D Jevons (3rd)	1102		
Conservative	H L Turner	908		
Conservative	Mrs D M Brooks	813		
Conservative	C F Brueton	809		
