= Arms-length management organisation =

Not-for-profit company that provides housing services on behalf of a local authority

In the United Kingdom, an arm's-length management organisation (ALMO) is a not-for-profit company that provides housing services on behalf of a local government on arm's length terms. Usually, an ALMO is set up by the authority to manage and improve all or part of its housing stock. Ownership of the housing stock itself normally stays with the local authority. The work of an ALMO may overlap with that of a tenant management organisation (TMO).

== Prevalence ==
By 2010, ALMOs managed more than half of all council housing – more than 1 million homes across 65 local authority areas. This number has since been reduced, as local authorities have taken services back in-house or stock has been transferred. In 2016, there were 37 ALMOs, managing nearly a third of local authority housing, approximately half a million council and ALMO homes. As of January 2024, further closures have reduced the number of ALMOs in England to 19, with 226,454 homes in management. The forthcoming closure of the Newcastle-on-Tyne's ALMO will reduce these figures to 18 ALMOs and 198,813 homes.

== Ownership and oversight ==
ALMOs are owned by local authorities and operate under the terms of a management agreement between the authority and the organisation. An ALMO is managed by an (often unpaid) board of directors, on which sit tenants, local authority nominees, and independent members. At least a third of an ALMO board is normally made up of tenants.

Establishment of an ALMO separates the day-to-day housing management role of the landlord from the wider strategic housing role of the local authority. However, the local authority normally retains ownership of the housing, and tenants remain secure tenants of the local authority. UK government ministers do not give consent to the establishment of a new ALMO without clear evidence that the local council has consulted its tenants and leaseholders and can demonstrate a balance of support from them for the ALMO proposal. Unlike stock transfers to housing association, councils are not required to hold a ballot when transferring management to an ALMO. However, many councils still choose to do so.

ALMOs are inspected and rated by the Housing Inspectorate (which was part of the Audit Commission). The Communities and Local Government (CLG) offered additional resources towards the cost of achieving the Decent Homes Standard to councils via ALMOs that were assessed as 2* (good) or 3* (excellent) on inspection. All ALMOs are registered with the National Federation of ALMOs (NFA) which lists them on its website together with copies of inspection reports and the number of stars achieved upon inspection.

=== Tax status ===
An ALMO cannot benefit from the same tax exemptions as a local authority. As a result, after discussions with the accounting firm of KPMG, HM Revenue & Customs have published guidance stating that, provided certain conditions are met, they will view activities between the ALMO and the local authority as a non-trading activity and so any profit arising will not be taxable.

== Criticisms ==
Since ALMOs are non-profit organisations that can receive extra funding, dependent on performance, critics have argued that ALMOs may be susceptible to cost-cutting measures, including worse pay and conditions for staff compared to the private sector, leading in turn to high staff turnover. However, the only inevitable additional cost of an ALMO is for its governance arrangements, which are typically less than 1% of management costs.

Others, such as the campaigning group Defend Council Housing (DCH), have characterised ALMOs as a stepping stone to stock transfer (the transfer of council housing away from local authorities), in areas where this would have previously been politically unacceptable.

== Level of success ==
The National Federation of ALMOs stated that, as of March 2008, 77% of tenants reported satisfaction with ALMO housing management. They also stated that 90% of ALMOs that have been inspected achieved a 2- or 3-star rating, and are therefore eligible for extra funding. They also report significant efficiency savings and an enhanced timetable for reaching the Decent Homes Standard for much of the country's housing stock.

In 2009, the government diverted money from ALMOs to building new homes. Councils that had promoted ALMOs in order to access the extra funding, and the tenants who had got involved, felt betrayed by the decision.

A number of ALMOs are considering whether to proceed with the construction of new housing that would be owned and managed by the ALMO. The ability of ALMOs to undertake new build projects is considered by the Government to be a way for ALMOs to develop and be financially viable post 2010, i.e. after the Decent Homes target date.

== List of ALMOs ==
As of May 2024, following ALMOs are registered with the NFA:

ALMO name	NFA region	Housing stock
Barnet Homes	London & Southern	13,991
Berneslai Homes	Northern	18,406
Blackpool Coastal Housing	Northern	5,191
Cheltenham Borough Homes	South West	5,137
Colchester Borough Homes	London & Southern	7,068
Cornwall Housing	South West	11,248
Derby Homes	Midlands	12,668
Eastbourne Homes	London & Southern	4,006
Homes in Sedgemoor	South West	4,136
Northamptonshire Partnership Homes	Midlands	12,492
Shropshire Towns and Rural Housing	Midlands	4,206
Solihull Community Housing	Midlands	11,566
South Essex Homes	London & Southern	6,670
South Tyneside Homes	Northern	17,375
St Leger homes of Doncaster	Northern	20,365
Stockport Homes	Northern	12,590
Sutton Housing Partnership	London & Southern	7,411
Wolverhampton Homes	Midlands	24,287
Your Homes Newcastle	Northern	27,641

== See also ==
- Tenant management organisation
