= Wolverhampton Civic Centre =

Municipal building in Wolverhampton, West Midlands, England

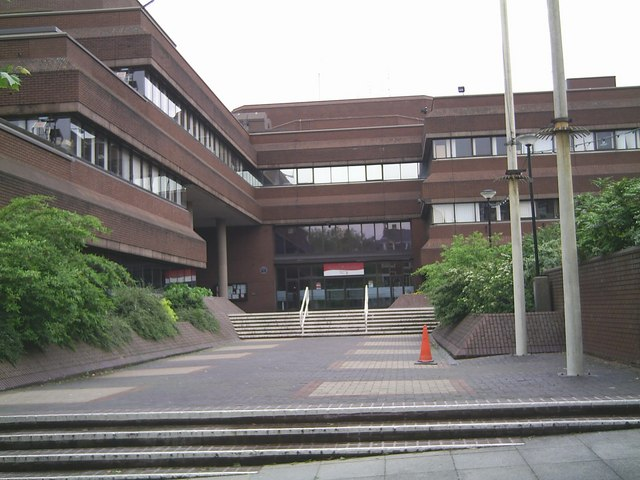
- Wolverhampton Civic Centre

- Location within West Midlands county

General information
- Architectural style: Postmodern style
- Location: Wolverhampton, West Midlands
- Coordinates: 52.5868°N 2.1298°W
- Inaugurated: 1978
- Owner: City of Wolverhampton Council

Design and construction
- Architects: Clifford Culpin & Partners
- Main contractor: Taylor Woodrow

Wolverhampton Civic Centre is a municipal building in the City of Wolverhampton, West Midlands, England. The building houses a council chamber for City of Wolverhampton Council.

== History ==
Following the implementation of re-organisation associated with the Local Government Act 1972, the new Wolverhampton Metropolitan Borough Council gained enhanced powers and decided to commission a modern facility to replace the old Town Hall on the opposite side of North Street. The site chosen for the new building was previously occupied by the old Wholesale Market which was demolished in May 1973. The statue of Lady Wulfruna by the sculptor, Sir Charles Wheeler, was erected on the site, to commemorate the centenary of the founding of the newspaper the Express & Star, in 1974.

The new building, which was designed by Clifford Culpin & Partners in the Postmodern style and built by Taylor Woodrow Construction, was completed in 1978. It was officially opened by the Prime Minister James Callaghan on 24 February 1979. The design, which involved a stepped profile for the building and located it on a large piazza, has similarities with the Panch Mahal in Fatehpur Sikri. It received a Civic Trust Award in 1979.

Queen Elizabeth II, accompanied by the Duke of Edinburgh visited the civic centre and met with civic leaders on 24 June 1994 and signed the visitors' book before departing for a tour of the new Molineux Stadium. Environmental works to improve the open area between the civic centre and St Peter's Collegiate Church were carried out with support from the Heritage Lottery Fund between 1996 and 2004.

A substantial programme of restoration works for the civic centre and its car park, to a design by Associated Architects, was carried out by Speller Metcalfe at a cost of £22 million and completed in 2018. The restoration work involved changes to the interior layout to create an open-plan environment: it also included creation of a new customer service centre on the ground floor.
