= 2018 City of Wolverhampton Council election =

2018 UK local government election

Map showing the results of the 2018 City of Wolverhampton Council election

The 2018 City of Wolverhampton Council election took place on 3 May 2018 to elect members of City of Wolverhampton Council in England. This was on the same day as other local elections.

== Results summary ==
Labour strengthened its position and subsequently its majority, after winning Spring Vale from UKIP of which was the party's only ever seat in the City and also gaining the once Conservative stronghold of Penn, marking the 1st time ever that Labour have had 2 out of the 3 seats, in the ward as mentioned.

The election also saw the first victory of the Conservative's Jane Stevenson within the Tettenhall Wightwick ward, who then was elected as Member of Parliament for Wolverhampton North East, at the 2019 United Kingdom general election.

The Composition of the Council as a result of May 3, 2018 stood at:

Affiliation	Members
Affiliation	Elected as of 2018
Labour	51
Conservative	9
Total number of seats	60
Actual majority	42

The specific change in seats, from the election was:

Labour - 51 (+2 Seats)

Conservative - 9 (-1 Seat)

UKIP - 0 (-1 Seat)

Results Breakdown - parties who stood no candidates in this election, but did in 2016 are not shown in the table

City of Wolverhampton Council Result 2018
Party	Seats	Gains	Losses	Net gain/loss	Seats %	Votes %	Votes	+/−
Labour	19	2	0	+2	86.36	58.04	32,491	+5,646
Conservative	3	0	-1	-1	13.64	33.69	18,860	-4,289
Liberal Democrats	0	0	0	0	0.00	4.35	2,437	+288
Green	0	0	0	0	0.00	2.53	1,418	+144
UKIP	0	0	-1	-1	0.00	0.93	521	-3,837
Independent	0	0	0	0	0.00	0.46	249	-600

== Ward results ==
=== Bilston East ===
Bilston East
Party	Candidate	Votes	%	±%
Labour	Stephen Simkins	1,327	65	
Conservative	Gillian Timms	423	21	
UKIP	Tom Fellows	290	14	

=== Bilston North ===
Bilston North
Party	Candidate	Votes	%	±%
Labour	Phil Page	1,333	67	
Conservative	Simon Hibell	547	27	
Green	Terry Hancox	110	6	

=== Blakenhall ===
Blakenhall
Party	Candidate	Votes	%	±%
Labour	Jasbinder Dehar	2,105	68	
Conservative	Sera Aulakh	838	27	
Liberal Democrats	Patrick Bentley	168	5	

=== Bushbury North ===
Bushbury North
Party	Candidate	Votes	%	±%
Labour	Alan Butt	1,143	47	
Conservative	Neville Patten	1,079	45	
Liberal Democrats	Carole Jenkins	96	4	
Green	Michelle Webster	96	4	

=== Bushbury South and Low Hill ===
Bushbury South and Low Hill
Party	Candidate	Votes	%	±%
Labour	Paul Sweet	1,270	70	
Conservative	Jennifer Brewer	431	24	
Liberal Democrats	Alan Bamber	113	6	

=== East Park ===
East Park
Party	Candidate	Votes	%	±%
Labour	Keith Inston	1,208	67	
Conservative	Suria Photay	353	20	
Independent	Steve Hall	249	13	

=== Ettingshall ===
Ettingshall
Party	Candidate	Votes	%	±%
Labour	Beverley Momenabadi	2,306	79	
Conservative	Adam Ansari	398	14	
Liberal Democrats	David Murray	200	7	

=== Fallings Park ===
Fallings Park
Party	Candidate	Votes	%	±%
Labour	Steve Evans	1,247	62	
Conservative	Josh Moreton	639	32	
Liberal Democrats	Peter Nixon	122	6	

=== Graiseley ===
Graiseley (2)
Party	Candidate	Votes	%	±%
Labour	Asha Mattu	1,926	65	
Labour	Jacqueline Sweetman	1,775	60	
Conservative	Kamran Khan	717	24	
Conservative	Safyaan Salim	619	21	
Green	Amy Bertaut	232	8	
Liberal Democrats	Kathryn Ball	187	6	
Liberal Democrats	Bryan Lewis	156	5	

=== Heath Town ===
Heath Town
Party	Candidate	Votes	%	±%
Labour	Caroline Siarkiewicz	1,454	71	
Conservative	Fortune Sibanda	584	29	

=== Merry Hill ===
Merry Hill
Party	Candidate	Votes	%	±%
Conservative	Simon Bennett	1,622	53	
Labour	Wayne O'Brien	1,299	43	
Liberal Democrats	Nirmal Singh	125	4	

=== Oxley ===
Oxley (2)
Party	Candidate	Votes	%	±%
Labour	Sue Roberts	1,221	53	
Labour	Clare Simm	1,105	48	
Conservative	Andrew McNeil	771	34	
Conservative	Zahid Shah	585	25	
Liberal Democrats	Ian Jenkins	272	12	
Liberal Democrats	Leyla Abbes	190	8	
Green	Helen Tudor	155	7	

=== Park ===
Park
Party	Candidate	Votes	%	±%
Labour	Craig Collingswood	1,745	62	
Conservative	Dan Preston	711	25	
Green	David Belcher	192	7	
Liberal Democrats	Nick Machnik-Foster	168	6	

=== Penn ===
Penn
Party	Candidate	Votes	%	±%
Labour	Celia Hibbert	1,823	48	
Conservative	David Mackintosh	1,802	47	
Liberal Democrats	Peter Hollis	173	5	

=== Spring Vale ===
Spring Vale
Party	Candidate	Votes	%	±%
Labour	Barbara McGarrity	1,469	69	
Conservative	Ajaz Ali	665	35	

=== St Peter’s ===
St Peter’s
Party	Candidate	Votes	%	±%
Labour	Obaida Ahmed	1,717	74	
Conservative	Mohammed Sohaib	356	15	
Green	Rachel Arnold	145	6	
Liberal Democrats	Natasha Allmark	94	5	

=== Tettenhall Regis ===
Tettenhall Regis
Party	Candidate	Votes	%	±%
Conservative	Sohail Khan	1,568	52	
Labour	Chester Morrison	1,120	37	
Liberal Democrats	Julian Donald	220	7	
Green	Clive Wood	120	4	

=== Tettenhall Wightwick ===
Tettenhall Wightwick
Party	Candidate	Votes	%	±%
Conservative	Jane Stevenson	2,373	69	
Labour	Yaseen Khan	732	21	
Green	Andrea Cantrill	160	5	
Liberal Democrats	David Marsh	153	4	

=== Wednesfield North ===
Wednesfield North
Party	Candidate	Votes	%	±%
Labour	Mary Bateman	1,242	54	
Conservative	David Hunt	749	33	
UKIP	Eddie Szwarc	231	10	
Green	Lee Harris	67	3	

=== Wednesfield South ===
Wednesfield South
Party	Candidate	Votes	%	±%
Labour	Greg Brackenridge	1,466	57	
Conservative	Ranjit Dhillon	974	38	
Green	Zak Roche	141	5	
