= 1979 Wolverhampton Metropolitan Borough Council election =

1979 UK local government election

English and Welsh Local Elections in 1979 were held on Thursday 5 May.

Following the elections the Labour Party had overall control of Wolverhampton Metropolitan Borough Council.

The Wolverhampton Association of Ratepayers became known simply as Ratepayers in the 1979 local elections.

The composition of the council prior to the election was:

- Labour 28
- Conservative 30
- Wolverhampton Association of Ratepayers 2

The composition of the council following the election was:

- Labour 30
- Conservative 29
- Ratepayers 1

== Ward results ==
Bilston East
Party	Candidate	Votes	%	±%
Labour	J Geraghty	3451		
Conservative	J Boden	1581		
Ratepayers	S Davis	233		
Liberal	C O'Brien	204		
National Front	B Hyde	135		
Majority		1870		
Labour hold		Swing		

Bilston North
Party	Candidate	Votes	%	±%
Labour	J Fenby	3544		
Conservative	J Speakman	2819		
Liberal	M Parsley	452		
National Front	S McNally	298		
Ratepayers	C Newman	229		
Majority		725		
Labour gain from Conservative		Swing		

Blakenhall
Party	Candidate	Votes	%	±%
Labour	R Reynolds	2870		
Conservative	P Ellis	2641		
Liberal	M Williams	369		
Ratepayers	B Simmons	339		
National Front	Mrs J Johnson	218		
Majority		299		
Labour gain from Conservative		Swing		

Bushbury
Party	Candidate	Votes	%	±%
Labour	N Dougherty	2809		
Conservative	Mrs I Bickley	1624		
Ratepayers	D Prince	482		
National Front	J Robinson	244		
Majority		1185		
Labour hold		Swing		

Eastfield
Party	Candidate	Votes	%	±%
Labour	W Garbett	3985		
Conservative	Mrs R Smith	1818		
Liberal	C Hallmark	660		
National Front	G Cooper	285		
Majority		2167		
Labour hold		Swing		

Ettingshall
Party	Candidate	Votes	%	±%
Labour	A Storer	2486		
Conservative	H Davies	1116		
Liberal	Mrs N O'Brien	196		
National Front	Mrs V Jones	192		
Ratepayers	B Reade	141		
Majority		1370		
Labour hold		Swing		

Graiseley
Party	Candidate	Votes	%	±%
Labour	Mrs N Jones	3094		
Conservative	N George	1727		
Liberal	Mrs J Woodhall	426		
National Front	Mrs M Robinson	196		
Ratepayers	B Wilkes	133		
Majority		1367		
Labour hold		Swing		

Low Hill
Party	Candidate	Votes	%	±%
Labour	C Laws	3431		
Conservative	P Turley	1879		
Liberal	J Thompson	291		
National Front	D Johnson	215		
Ratepayers	J Sharples	138		
Majority		1552		
Labour hold		Swing		

Merry Hill
Party	Candidate	Votes	%	±%
Conservative	R Hart	5325		
Labour	R Haynes	2735		
Liberal	Mrs G Ricketts	681		
WAR	Mrs E Powell	505		
National Front	B Percival	204		
Majority		2590		
Conservative hold		Swing		

Oxley
Party	Candidate	Votes	%	±%
Conservative	W Hillier	2436		
Labour		2228		
Ratepayers	R Stickland	1519		
Liberal	Mrs W Hallmark	300		
National Front	Mrs A Ryan	182		
Majority		208		

Conservative gain from Ratepayers

Park
Party	Candidate	Votes	%	±%
Conservative	Mrs M Hodson	3209		
Labour	P Bateman	1963		
Liberal	Mrs B Craft	689		
Ratepayers	T Rathbone	242		
National Front	Mrs C Simpson	108		
Majority		1246		
Conservative hold		Swing		

Parkfield
Party	Candidate	Votes	%	±%
Labour	A Steventon	2902		
Conservative	B Carpenter	1126		
Independent	S Hunting	418		
Liberal	Mrs A Whitehouse	170		
National Front	J Thomas	147		
Majority		1776		
Labour hold		Swing		

Penn
Party	Candidate	Votes	%	±%
Conservative	Mrs P Bradley	4786		
Labour	S Holding	1161		
Liberal	F Hemsley	1087		
Ratepayers	R Thomas	433		
National Front	B Downing	157		
Majority		3625		
Conservative hold		Swing		

St Peters
Party	Candidate	Votes	%	±%
Labour	B Dass	2241		
Conservative	Mrs G Hodson	1363		
Independent Labour & Trade Unionist	N S Noor	1220		
Liberal	D Craft	401		
Ratepayers	J Smith	189		
National Front	Mrs J Lees	183		
Labour hold		Swing		

Spring Vale
Party	Candidate	Votes	%	±%
Labour	A Garner	3842		
Conservative	E Edwards	3257		
Liberal	T Clark	591		
National Front	E Shaw	375		
Majority		585		
Labour hold		Swing		

Tettenhall Regis
Party	Candidate	Votes	%	±%
Conservative	Mrs M Compton	4361		
Ratepayers	Mrs F Sneyd	1039		
Labour	S Smith	1007		
Liberal	M Woodhall	640		
National Front	Mrs C Thomas	112		
Majority		3354		
Conservative hold		Swing		

Tettenhall Wightwick
Party	Candidate	Votes	%	±%
Conservative	E Pearce	5087		
Labour	M Smith	1683		
Liberal	Mrs S Ascott	862		
Ratepayers	J Fereday	391		
National Front	J Moles	178		
Majority		3404		
Conservative hold		Swing		

Wednesfield Heath
Party	Candidate	Votes	%	±%
Conservative	H L Turner	3230		
Labour	Mrs L Richards	2274		
Liberal	A Dawson	522		
Ratepayers	Mrs M Morris	332		
National Front	G Jones	222		
Majority		956		
Conservative hold		Swing		

Wednesfield North
Party	Candidate	Votes	%	±%
Labour	A Morey	4472		
Conservative	R Woodhouse	3269		
Liberal	Mrs S Thompson	634		
Ratepayers	Mrs J Gunter	459		
National Front	Mrs M Mcnally	313		
Majority		1203		
Labour hold		Swing		

Wednesfield South
Party	Candidate	Votes	%	±%
Conservative	A Griffiths	2849		
Labour	Mrs G Stafford-Good	2806		
Liberal	L McLean	558		
Ratepayers	Mrs V Sharples	236		
National Front	Mrs J Percival	166		
Majority		43		
Conservative hold		Swing		
