= 2021 City of Wolverhampton Council election =

2021 UK local government election

Map showing the results of the 2021 Wolverhampton City Council election

The 2021 City of Wolverhampton Council Election took place on 6 May 2021 to elect members of City of Wolverhampton Council in England. This was on the same day as other local elections. One-third of the seats were up for election.

== Results ==
2021 Wolverhampton City Council election
Party	This election			Full council			This election		
Party	Seats	Net	Seats %	Other	Total	Total %	Votes	Votes %	+/−
Labour	14	▼5	63.6	30	44	73.3	30,419	47.2	-0.2
Conservative	8	▲5	36.4	7	15	25.0	27,688	43.0	+10.4
Green	0	Steady	0.0	0	0	0.0	3,996	6.2	-0.6
Liberal Democrats	0	Steady	0.0	0	0	0.0	1,871	2.9	-2.8
Independent	0	Steady	0.0	1	1	1.7	217	0.3	-0.8
Workers Party	0	Steady	0.0	0	0	0.0	146	0.2	New
TUSC	0	Steady	0.0	0	0	0.0	53	0.1	New

== Ward results ==
=== Bilston East ===
Bilston East
Party	Candidate	Votes	%	±%
Labour	Gillian Wildman	1,424	54.52	▲4.33
Conservative	Christopher Thompson	838	32.08	▲18.55
Independent	Thomas Fellows	217	8.31	▼27.98
Green	Holly Whitmill	133	5.09	N/A
Majority		586	22.43	▲8.54
Turnout		2,612		
Labour hold		Swing		

Thomas Fellows stood in the previous election for the UK Independence Party.

=== Bilston North ===
Bilston North
Party	Candidate	Votes	%	±%
Labour	Linda Leach	1,553	59.82	▼1.10
Conservative	Rajpal Singh	895	34.48	▲17.30
Green	Richard Carter	148	5.70	N/A
Majority		658	25.35	▼13.59
Turnout		2,596		
Labour hold		Swing		

=== Blakenhall ===
Blakenhall
Party	Candidate	Votes	%	±%
Labour	Tersaim Singh	2,292	71.94	▲12.90
Conservative	Mohammed Sohaib	542	17.01	▲0.33
Liberal Democrats	Patrick Bentley	201	6.31	N/A
Green	Keith Gilbert	151	4.74	N/A
Majority		1,750	54.93	▲20.17
Turnout		3,186		
Labour hold		Swing		

=== Bushbury North ===
Bushbury North
Party	Candidate	Votes	%	±%
Conservative	Andrew McNeil	1,670	58.23	
Labour	Janet Smith	982	34.24	
Liberal Democrats	Ian Jenkins	117	4.08	
Green	Rosa van Doorn	99	3.45	
Majority		688	23.99	
Turnout		2,868		
Conservative gain from Labour		Swing		

=== Bushbury South and Low Hill ===
Bushbury South and Low Hill
Party	Candidate	Votes	%	±%
Labour	Ian Brookfield	1,421	58.24	
Conservative	Matt Powis	882	36.15	
Green	Clive Wood	137	5.61	
Majority		539	22.09	
Turnout		2,440		
Labour hold		Swing		

=== East Park ===
East Park
Party	Candidate	Votes	%	±%
Labour	Anwen Muston	1,207	54.15	
Conservative	Steve Hall	882	39.57	
Green	Benjamin Cole	140	6.28	
Majority		325	14.58	
Turnout		2,229		
Labour hold		Swing		

=== Ettingshall ===
Ettingshall
Party	Candidate	Votes	%	±%
Labour	Zee Russell	2,359	67.6	
Conservative	Safyaan Salim	674	19.3	
Liberal Democrats	David Murray	332	9.5	
Green	Michelle Webster	124	3.6	
Majority		1,685		
Turnout		3,489		
Labour hold		Swing		

=== Fallings Park ===
Fallings Park
Party	Candidate	Votes	%	±%
Labour	Chris Burden	1,186	47.1	
Conservative	Ranjit Dhillon	1,117	44.3	
Liberal Democrats	Peter Nixon	111	4.4	
Green	Helen Currie	105	4.2	
Majority		69		
Turnout		2,519		
Labour hold		Swing		

=== Graiseley ===
Graiseley
Party	Candidate	Votes	%	±%
Labour	John Reynolds	1,792	59.2	
Conservative	Kiran Basra	867	28.7	
Green	Amy Bertaut	252	8.3	
Liberal Democrats	Kathryn Ball	114	3.8	
Majority		925		
Turnout		3,025		
Labour hold		Swing		

=== Heath Town ===
Heath Town
Party	Candidate	Votes	%	±%
Labour	Jasbir Jaspal	1,123	47.4	
Labour	Jaspreet Jaspal	930	39.3	
Conservative	Fortune Sibanda	658	27.8	
Conservative	Sucha Sahota	594	25.1	
Liberal Democrats	Rachel Ashby-Filippin	218	9.2	
Green	Stephen Petter	174	7.3	
Workers Party	Alan Russell	146	6.2	
Green	Ayden Young	127	5.4	
Liberal Democrats	Alan Bamber	112	4.7	
Turnout		4,082		
Labour hold		Swing		
Labour hold		Swing		

=== Merry Hill ===
Merry Hill
Party	Candidate	Votes	%	±%
Conservative	Wendy Dalton	2,001	56.3	
Labour	Alan Bolshaw	1,324	37.3	
Green	Daniel Flynn	227	7.8	
Majority		677		
Turnout		3,552		
Conservative gain from Labour		Swing		

=== Oxley ===
Oxley
Party	Candidate	Votes	%	±%
Conservative	Adam Collinge	1,249	45.4	
Labour	Louise Miles	1,179	42.8	
Liberal Democrats	Ann Jenkins	143	5.2	
Green	Mia Clark	130	4.7	
TUSC	Joshua Allerton	53	1.9	
Majority		70		
Turnout		2,754		
Conservative gain from Labour		Swing		

=== Park ===
Park
Party	Candidate	Votes	%	±%
Labour	Claire Darke	1,640	53.9	
Conservative	Robert Brotherton	1,049	34.5	
Green	Rachel Arnold	249	8.2	
Liberal Democrats	Bryan Lewis	103	3.4	
Majority		591		
Turnout		3,041		
Labour hold		Swing		

=== Penn ===
Penn
Party	Candidate	Votes	%	±%
Conservative	Stephanie Haynes	2,464	54.6	
Labour	Tom Moreton	1,775	39.6	
Green	Kathryn Gilbert	271	6.0	
Majority		689		
Turnout		4,510		
Conservative gain from Labour		Swing		

=== Spring Vale ===
Spring Vale
Party	Candidate	Votes	%	±%
Labour	Mak Singh	1,401	54.2	
Conservative	Sian Kumar	977	37.8	
Green	Duncan Nimmo	209	8.1	
Majority		424		
Turnout		2,587		
Labour hold		Swing		

=== St Peters ===
St Peters
Party	Candidate	Votes	%	±%
Labour	Qaiser Azeem	1,447	63.2	
Conservative	Zahid Shah	569	24.9	
Green	Terry Hancox	272	11.9	
Majority		878		
Turnout		2,288		
Labour hold		Swing		

=== Tettenhall Regis ===
Tettenhall Regis
Party	Candidate	Votes	%	±%
Conservative	Udey Singh	2,242	59.6	
Labour	Carol Hyatt	1,162	30.9	
Green	Valerie Wood	210	5.6	
Liberal Democrats	Julian Donald	150	4.0	
Majority		1,080		
Turnout		3,764		
Conservative hold		Swing		

=== Tettenhall Wightwick ===
Tettenhall Wightwick
Party	Candidate	Votes	%	±%
Conservative	Ellis Turrell	2,505	59.5	
Conservative	Jonathan Crofts	2,470	58.7	
Labour	Walker Darke	895	21.3	
Labour	Kashmire Hawker	789	18.7	
Green	Andrea Cantrill	326	7.7	
Green	Christopher Brookes	230	5.5	
Liberal Democrats	Peter Hollis	162	3.8	
Liberal Democrats	David Marsh	116	2.8	
Turnout		4,210		
Conservative hold		Swing		
Conservative hold		Swing		

=== Wednesfield North ===
Wednesfield North
Party	Candidate	Votes	%	±%
Labour	Phil Bateman	1,339	52.8	
Conservative	Gordon Newell	1,086	42.8	
Green	Lee Harris	112	4.4	
Majority		253		
Turnout		2,537		
Labour hold		Swing		

=== Wednesfield South ===
Wednesfield South
Party	Candidate	Votes	%	±%
Conservative	Andy Randle	1,457	52.1	
Labour	Jacqui Coogan	1,199	42.9	
Green	David Belcher	140	5.0	
Majority		258		
Turnout		2,796		
Conservative gain from Labour		Swing		

== By-elections ==
=== East Park ===
East Park: 7 April 2022
Party	Candidate	Votes	%	±%
Labour	Lovinyer Daley	783	65.5	+11.4
Conservative	Steve Hall	412	34.5	−5.1
Majority		371	31.0	
Turnout		1,200	13.2	
Labour hold		Swing	▲8.3	
