= Wolverhampton Homes =

- Formation: 2005
- Type: Arms-length management organisation
- Purpose: Housing management
- Location: Wolverhampton
- Region served: Wolverhampton
- Chief Executive: Shaun Aldis
- Parent organization: City of Wolverhampton Council
- Website: www.wolverhamptonhomes.org.uk

Wolverhampton Homes is an Arms-length Management Organisation (ALMO) which manages properties owned by Wolverhampton City Council, in Wolverhampton, England. It was established in 2005 and is a registered member of the National Federation of ALMOs. Its chief executive is Shaun Aldis.

It is responsible for letting the homes through a letting scheme called 'Homes in the City', collecting rent and other charges, repairing the properties and delivering the Government's Decent Homes programme. It is governed by a board of 15 directors. Five of whom are independent, with expertise in a variety of professional functions, five are tenants, who live in the homes themselves and five are Councillors at Wolverhampton City Council.

It manages approximately 23,500 properties, which includes 1900 leaseholds (where a tenant has bought a property through the Right to buy scheme and in the process has become a leaseholder).
