= 1992 Wolverhampton Metropolitan Borough Council election =

1992 UK local government election

The 1992 election to Wolverhampton Metropolitan Borough Council was held on 7 May 1992. One third of the council was up for election and the Conservative Party led the Council in coalition with the Liberal Democrats until the next round of elections in 1994.

== Composition ==
Prior to the election, the composition of the council was:

- Labour Party 35
- Conservative Party 22
- Liberal Democrat 3

After the election, the composition of the council was:

- Labour Party 29
- Conservative Party 28
- Liberal Democrat 3

== Election result ==
Wolverhampton local election result 1992
Party	Seats	Gains	Losses	Net gain/loss	Seats %	Votes %	Votes	+/−
Labour	29	0	6	-6	48.33			
Conservative	28	6	0	+6	46.67			
Liberal Democrats	3	0	0	0	5.00			

== Ward results ==
Bilston East
Party	Candidate	Votes	%	±%
Labour	John E Collingswood	1078		
Liberal Democrats	Mrs A E Ramsbottom	849		
Conservative	Mrs V Robinson	590		
Majority		229		
Labour hold		Swing		

Bilston North
Party	Candidate	Votes	%	±%
Conservative	Peter O'Connell	1866		
Labour	Cornelius Dougherty	1651		
Liberal Democrats	P E Lloyd	212		
Majority		215		
Conservative gain from Labour		Swing		

Blakenhall
Party	Candidate	Votes	%	±%
Labour	Robert Jones	1950		
Conservative	Mrs Jean E Shore	1388		
Liberal Democrats	T E Kerr	196		
Majority		562		
Labour hold		Swing		

Bushbury
Party	Candidate	Votes	%	±%
Conservative	Charles Brueton	2734		
Labour	Mrs P Wesley	1097		
Liberal Democrats	Mrs C A Jenkins	194		
Majority		1637		
Conservative hold		Swing		

East Park
Party	Candidate	Votes	%	±%
Labour	Mrs Pat Byrne	1796		
Conservative	Mrs J Louder	1065		
Liberal Democrats	Mrs L Gwinnett	264		
Majority		731		
Labour hold		Swing		

Ettingshall
Party	Candidate	Votes	%	±%
Labour	Andrew Johnson	1515		
Conservative	Robert Green	817		
Liberal Democrats	T C Heaton	181		
Majority		698		
Labour hold		Swing		

Fallings Park
Party	Candidate	Votes	%	±%
Conservative	Mrs Margaret Findlay	2306		
Labour	I C Grainger	1504		
Liberal Democrats	Wayne M Beard	221		
Majority		802		
Conservative gain from Labour		Swing		

Graiseley
Party	Candidate	Votes	%	±%
Conservative	G Mark Simpson	2415		
Labour	Mrs Judith Rowley	2333		
Liberal Democrats	S J Birch	194		
Majority		82		
Conservative gain from Labour		Swing		

Heath Town
Party	Candidate	Votes	%	±%
Labour	R N Harding	1374		
Conservative	Sham Dev Sharma	916		
Liberal	Colin Hallmark	587		
Liberal Democrats	Mrs M M O'Brien	80		
Majority		485		
Labour hold		Swing		

Low Hill
Party	Candidate	Votes	%	±%
Labour	J McCallum	1580		
Conservative	Mrs Jean Lenoir	1124		
Liberal Democrats	D E Iles	182		
Majority		456		
Labour hold		Swing		

Merry Hill
Party	Candidate	Votes	%	±%
Conservative	Mrs Christine Mills	3049		
Labour	C F Matthews	984		
Liberal Democrats	J N M White	315		
Majority		2065		
Conservative hold		Swing		

Oxley
Party	Candidate	Votes	%	±%
Conservative	Mrs Patricia Patten	2314		
Labour	J Clifford	1515		
Liberal Democrats	I C Jenkins	228		
Majority		799		
Conservative gain from Labour		Swing		

Park
Party	Candidate	Votes	%	±%
Conservative	Ray Swatman	2900		
Labour	M R Swain	1639		
Liberal Democrats	A Parker	393		
Majority		1261		
Conservative hold		Swing		

Penn
Party	Candidate	Votes	%	±%
Conservative	Alan Hart	3322		
Labour	A J Romaya	748		
Liberal Democrats	S M Jones-Williams	407		
Majority		2574		
Conservative hold		Swing		

Spring Vale
Party	Candidate	Votes	%	±%
Liberal Democrats	Richard Whitehouse	2486		
Labour	M D Thomas	1213		
Conservative	Miss M Bradley	712		
Majority		1273		
Liberal Democrats hold		Swing		

St Peter's
Party	Candidate	Votes	%	±%
Labour	Surjan Singh Duhra	1913		
Conservative	Matthew A Norton	974		
Liberal Democrats	R Gray	352		
Majority		939		
Labour hold		Swing		

Tettenhall Regis
Party	Candidate	Votes	%	±%
Conservative	Mrs Doreen Seiboth	2770		
Liberal Democrats	B H Lewis	1075		
Labour	Miss Helen King	506		
Majority		1695		
Conservative hold		Swing		

Tettenhall Wightwick
Party	Candidate	Votes	%	±%
Conservative	Mrs Wendy Thompson	3520		
Labour	Mrs Caroline Siarkiewicz	653		
Liberal Democrats	Miss T J O'Brien	267		
Majority		2867		
Conservative hold		Swing		

Wednesfield North
Party	Candidate	Votes	%	±%
Conservative	Andrew Dawson	2166		
Labour	Philip Bateman	1857		
Liberal	M A Pearson	397		
Majority		309		
Conservative gain from Labour		Swing		

Wednesfield South
Party	Candidate	Votes	%	±%
Conservative	Mrs Trina Brindley	2385		
Labour	Mrs T Walton	1503		
Liberal Democrats	J J Steatham	185		
Majority		882		
Conservative gain from Labour		Swing		
