= Miro Griffiths =

Social activist

Miro Griffiths MBE
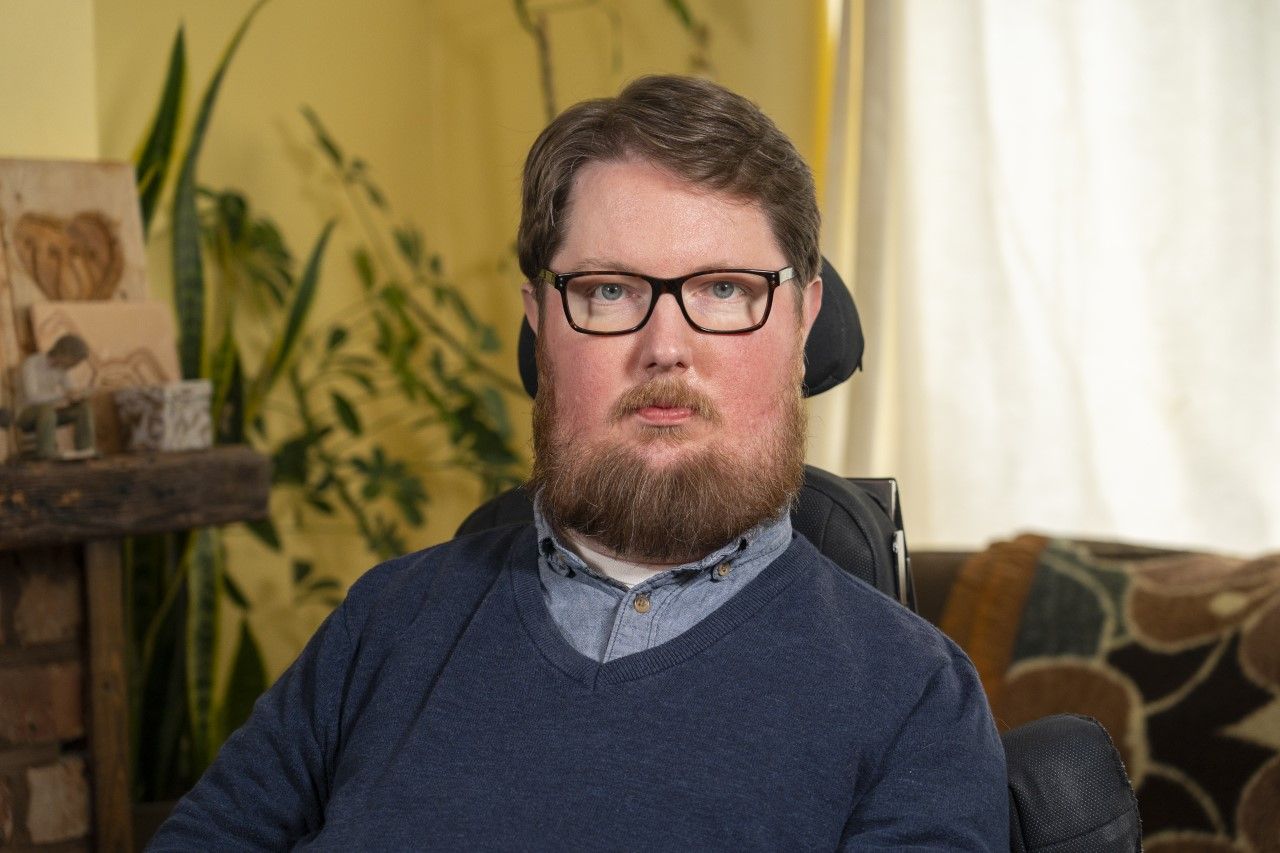
- Born: May 29, 1989 (age 37); Birkenhead
- Education: University of Liverpool; University of Leeds; Liverpool John Moores University

Miro Griffiths (born 29 May 1989) is a British and Slovene scholar, policy adviser, and disability liberation advocate who is an associate professor in Social Policy and Disability Studies based at the University of Leeds, in the School of Sociology and Social Policy. He is also Director of the Centre for Disability Studies, an interdisciplinary research centre exploring disabled people's oppression, marginalisation, and liberation. Alongside academia, Griffiths is a disability policy adviser, including at the UK Government Department for Transport; and is a former strategic and confidential adviser during two UK Government administrations, and a former adviser to the Equality and Human Rights Commission.

== Early life and education ==
Born in the Wirral, Griffiths went to West Kirby Primary School. He wanted to go to Hilbre High School but was unable to do so because of its inaccessibility. He instead went to Woodchurch High School and then Birkenhead Sixth Form. His father, David, was an Aerospace Engineer and his mother, Helena, a Slovenian writer. He has one sibling, Jan Griffiths.

At thirteen years old, he received a Millennium Award which led to the conceptualised development of a computer game promoting disability equality.

Griffiths studied psychology at the University of Liverpool, and subsequently a Master's in Disability Studies at the University of Leeds. He completed his PhD on young disabled people in the Disabled People's Movement at Liverpool John Moores University.

== Personal life ==
Griffiths lives on the Wirral with his partner, Dr Emma Fairweather, who is a bioscientist. He is a power wheelchair user, who has Spinal Muscular Atrophy (Type II) and receives 24-hour personal healthcare assistance. Griffiths has spoken about the importance of self-directed support, the use of personal budgets to coordinate assistance, and the blending of human and technological support infrastructure.

== Academic work ==
Griffiths began working as a Teaching Fellow in Disability Studies at the University of Leeds in 2018. He was awarded a Leverhulme Trust Research Fellowship, at the University of Leeds, in 2020 until 2024. During the Leverhulme Trust Fellowship, he was the Principal Investigator on the Disability Activism in Europe project. This project explored young disabled people's experiences and views of disability activism across Europe. His project has received media attention from the BBC (UK). and US documentary filmmakers

Griffiths is the Director of the Centre for Disability Studies at the University of Leeds. Griffiths is an Executive Editor for the International Journal of Disability and Social Justice and former Managing Editor for the Journal of Disability Studies in Education.

In September 2022, Griffiths was recognised by the International Sociological Association and awarded “Sociologist of the Month” in recognition for his research and publications. He was an Invited Fellow of the Royal Society of Arts for recognition to Social Movement Studies. He was recognised in the Disability Power 100 List (2023) as one of the most powerful disabled people working in education, in the Alumni Awards at the University of Liverpool (2024), and by the Association For Learning Technology (Award for Case Studies of Ethical EdTech, 2024), for his work on the University of Leeds online MSc in Disability Studies, Rights, And Inclusion.

Griffiths is a former strategic and confidential adviser to the UK Government (Labour, and Conservative – LibDem coalition, administrations) and former adviser to the UK Equality and Human Rights Commission. He continues to provide policy advice to the UK Government, European Commission and Liverpool City Region.

Griffiths has made appearances discussing disability, politics, culture and society on the BBC, ITV, iNews, the Telegraph, HuffPost, the Herald and the Scotsman. He has been a regular guest on the BBC Radio 4 Moral Maze. Griffiths has also written for The Conversation. He has appeared on 'The Human Rights Podcast', the 'Digital Disability Podcast', 'The Football Collective' and Council of Europe.

== Activism ==
Griffiths is an advocate of disabled people's political status, rights, and pursuit for liberation. He has spoken publicly about his commitment to the social model of disability, independent living philosophy and disabled people's organisations. He has taken on board positions within the European Network on Independent living, Independent Living Institute, Alliance for Inclusive Education, and DaDaFest. He is a critic of assisted suicide, and is a part of the Not Dead Yet movement. In 2025, Griffiths was requested by the Scottish Parliament and UK Parliament to give oral evidence during the Bill Committee Hearings on proposed assisted dying legislation.

Griffiths was part of the UK delegation, in New York (2006), at the Signing Ceremony for the United Nations Convention on the Rights of Persons with Disabilities.

He was awarded Member of the Order of the British Empire (MBE) in the Queen's Birthday Honours list 2014. He was also named as an influential disabled activist by the Disability News Service.
