= City of Wolverhampton Council =

Local government body in England

- Coat of arms

Type
- Type: Metropolitan borough council

Leadership
- Mayor: Paul Singh, Conservative since 20 May 2026
- Leader: Stephen Simkins, Labour since 13 September 2023
- Chief Executive: Tim Johnson since July 2018

Structure
- Seats: 60 councillors
- Graph of the party split among 60 seats.
- Political groups: Administration (35) Labour (35) Other parties (25) Reform (13) Conservative (9) Independent (3)
- Joint committees: West Midlands Combined Authority

Elections
- Voting system: Plurality-at-large
- Last election: 7 May 2026
- Next election: 6 May 2027

Motto
- Out of Darkness Cometh Light

Meeting place
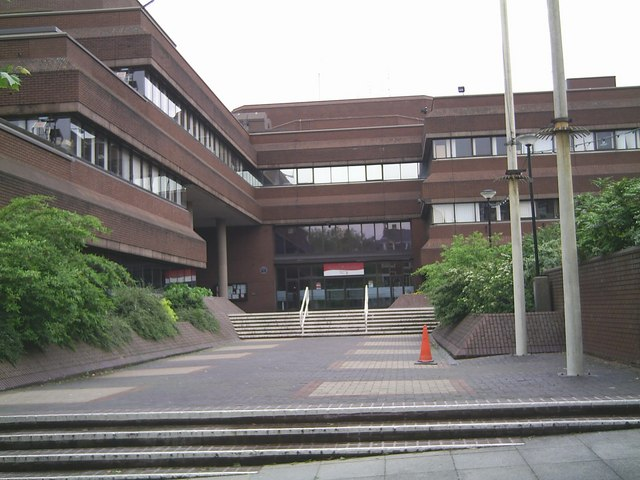
- Civic Centre, St Peter's Square, Wolverhampton, WV1 1SH

Website
- www.wolverhampton.gov.uk

City of Wolverhampton Council is the local authority for the city of Wolverhampton in the West Midlands, England. Wolverhampton has had an elected local authority since 1848, which has been reformed several times. Since 1974 the council has been a metropolitan borough council. It provides the majority of local government services in the city. The council has been a member of the West Midlands Combined Authority since 2016.

The council has been under Labour majority control since 2011. It is based at the Civic Centre on St Peter's Square.

== History ==
Wolverhampton gained the beginnings of modern local government in 1777, when a body of improvement commissioners known as the Wolverhampton Town Commissioners was created. The commissioners undertook a variety of local improvement work such as punishing bear baiting, improving drainage and widening streets. By the end of the eighteenth century street lighting had been provided at every street corner and over the doorway of every inn, and water supply had been improved by the sinking of ten new wells and the provision of a great water tank in the market place. Policing had been improved with the appointment of ten watchmen and attempts were also made to regulate the markets and inspect hazardous food.

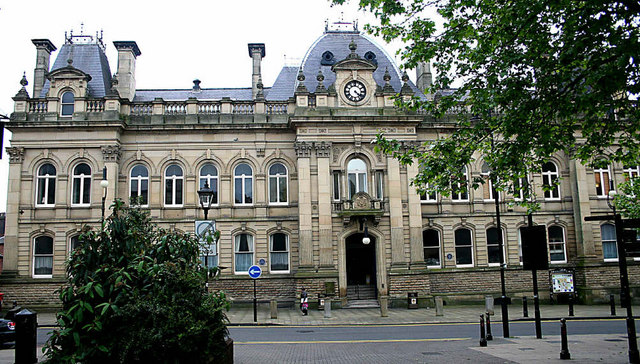
Old Town Hall: Council's headquarters 1871–1979

Wolverhampton (Improvements) Act 1776
- Act of Parliament
- Parliament of Great Britain
- Long title: An Act for widening, cleansing, and lighting, the several Streets, Lanes, Alleys, Ways, and other publick Passages, within the Town of Wolverhampton, in the County of Stafford; and for taking down, altering, or re-building, certain Buildings therein mentioned, and for removing all other Nuisances and Encroachments; and for regulating Carts and other Carriages within the said Town.
- Citation: 17 Geo. 3. c. 25
- Territorial extent: Great Britain

Dates
- Royal assent: 16 May 1777
- Commencement: 31 October 1776 (Note: Start of session.)
- Repealed: 17 June 1814
Other legislation
Repealed by	Wolverhampton Improvement and Markets Act 1814

Status: Repealed

Text of statute as originally enacted

Wolverhampton was incorporated as a municipal borough in 1848. It was then governed by a body formally called the 'mayor, aldermen and burgesses of the borough of Wolverhampton', generally known as the corporation, town council or borough council. The first meeting of the council, consisting of 12 aldermen and 36 councillors, was held on 22 May 1848.

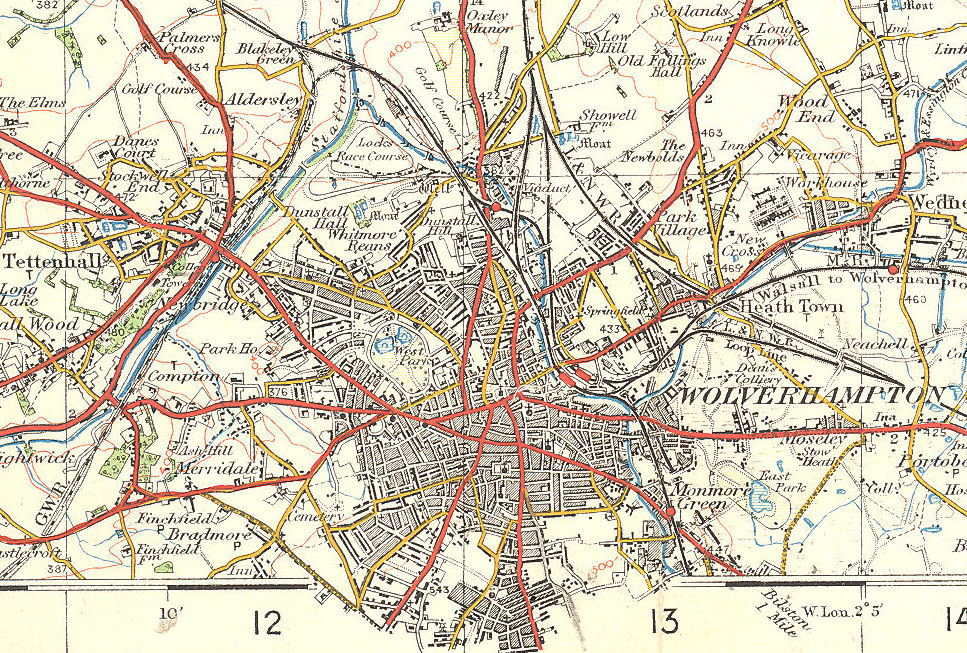
Wolverhampton in 1921

When elected county councils were established in 1889, Wolverhampton was considered large enough for its existing council to provide county-level services, and so it became a county borough, independent from the new Staffordshire County Council, whilst remaining part of the geographical county of Staffordshire. The borough boundaries were enlarged on several occasions, notably absorbing Heath Town in 1927, parts of several neighbouring parishes in 1933, and Bilston, Tettenhall and Wednesfield in 1966 (alongside adjustments to the boundaries with several other neighbouring districts). The vast majority of the later additions had previously been part of the ancient parish of Wolverhampton and the original parliamentary borough (constituency).

Wolverhampton had no further changes made to its boundaries during the 1974 reorganisation of local government, the borough already having a population larger than the 250,000 required for education authorities. This contrasted with both the Redcliffe-Maud Report, and the initial White Paper for the 1974 reforms which had proposed adding large areas of the present South Staffordshire district to Wolverhampton. As part of the 1974 the borough was redesignated as a metropolitan borough rather than a county borough and it was transferred to the new metropolitan county of the West Midlands. The reconstituted district retained its borough status, allowing the chair of the council to take the title of mayor, continuing Wolverhampton's series of mayors dating back to 1848.

From 1974 until 1986 the council was a lower-tier authority, with upper-tier functions provided by the West Midlands County Council. The county council was abolished in 1986 and its functions passed to the county's seven borough councils, including Wolverhampton, with some services provided through joint committees.

Since 2016 the council has been a member of the West Midlands Combined Authority, which has been led by the directly elected Mayor of the West Midlands since 2017. The combined authority provides strategic leadership and co-ordination for certain functions across the county, but City of Wolverhampton Council continues to be responsible for most local government functions.

From 1974 until 2001 the council was called 'Wolverhampton Metropolitan Borough Council'. Wolverhampton was awarded city status in 2001, after which the council was called 'Wolverhampton City Council'. In 2015 the council rebranded itself as 'City of Wolverhampton Council'.

== Governance ==
The city council provides metropolitan borough services. Some strategic functions in the area are provided by the West Midlands Combined Authority; the leader and deputy leader of the council sit on the board of the combined authority as Wolverhampton's representatives. There are no civil parishes in the borough.

The council won Local Authority of the Year, Most Improved Local Authority of the Year, Leadership Team of the Year and Governance & Scrutiny Team of the Year at the Municipal Journal National Awards in 2017.

The council's housing stock is managed by Wolverhampton Homes.

=== Political control ===
The council has been under Labour majority control since 2011.

Political control of the council since 1974 has been as follows:

Party in control	Years
Labour	1974–1978
No overall control	1978–1980
Labour	1980–1987
No overall control	1987–1988
Labour	1988–1992
No overall control	1992–1994
Labour	1994–2008
No overall control	2008–2011
Labour	2011–present

=== Leadership ===
The role of mayor is largely ceremonial in Wolverhampton. Political leadership is instead provided by the leader of the council. The leaders since the 1974 reforms took effect have been:

Councillor	Party	From	To
John Bird	Labour	1974	1987
Bill Clarke	Conservative	20 May 1987	May 1988
Norman Davies	Labour	May 1988	May 1992
Bill Clarke	Conservative	May 1992	May 1994
Norman Davies	Labour	May 1994	May 2002
Roger Lawrence	Labour	15 May 2002	14 May 2008
Neville Patten	Conservative	14 May 2008	15 Dec 2010
Roger Lawrence	Labour	15 Dec 2010	15 May 2019
Ian Brookfield	Labour	15 May 2019	2 July 2023
Stephen Simkins	Labour	13 Sep 2023	

=== Composition ===
Following the 2026 election, and a subsequent change of allegiance later in May 2026, the composition of the council was:

Party	Seats
Labour	35
Reform	13
Conservative	9
Independent	3
Total	60

The next election is due in May 2027.

== Elections ==
Since the last boundary changes in 2023, the council has comprised 60 councillors representing 20 wards, with each ward electing three councillors. Elections are held three years out of every four, with a third of the council (one councillor for each ward) being elected each time for a four-year term of office.

== Premises ==
The council meets and has its main offices at Wolverhampton Civic Centre, in St Peter's Square in the city centre. The building was purpose-built for the council and opened in 1979. Prior to 1979 the council had met at the Town Hall on North Street, which had been completed in 1871 for the old borough council.

== Coat of arms ==
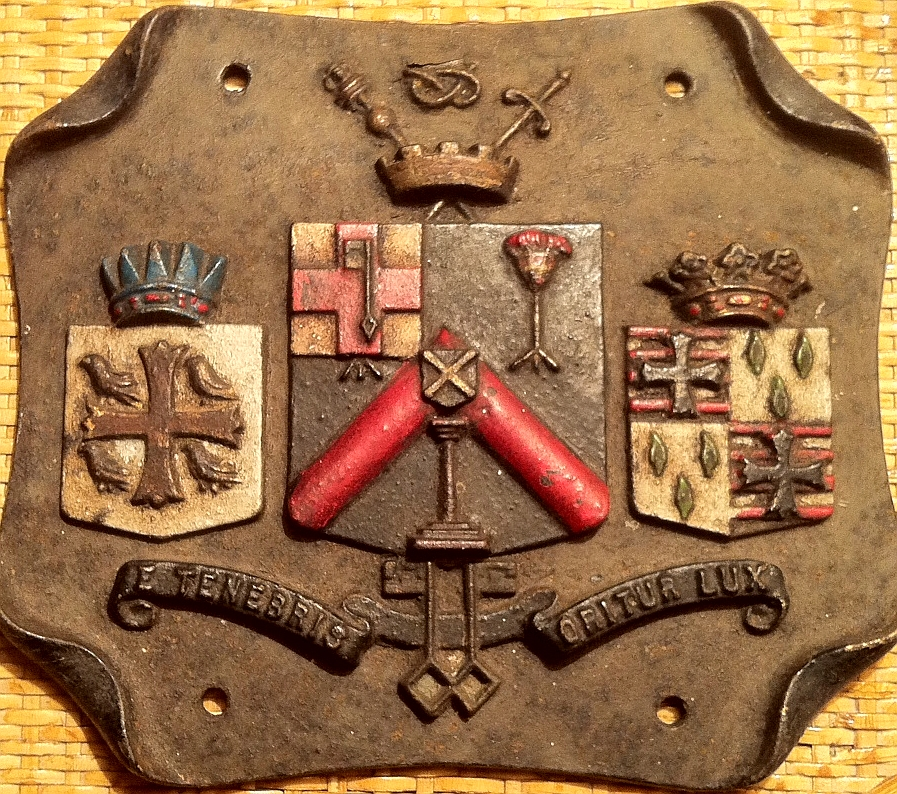
Commemorative plaque showing the coat of arms of Wolverhampton Council pre 1898

The coat of arms of Wolverhampton was granted on 31 December 1898, on the occasion of the 50th anniversary of the foundation of the council.

The various symbols within the arms are representative of the history of the city. The book represents the education within the city, specifically the 16th century Wolverhampton Grammar School; the woolpack represents the mediaeval woollen trade within the city; the column is a representation of the Saxon pillar that can be found within the churchyard of St. Peter's Collegiate Church in the city centre; whilst the keys are representative of the church itself and its dedication to St. Peter. The padlock represents one of the major industries of the area at the time of the granting of the arms – that of lock-making; whilst the brazier at the top is indicative of the general metal-working industries in the area. The cross is ascribed to King Edgar.

The motto on the coat of arms is 'Out of Darkness Cometh Light'.

Prior to 1898 there was a former coat of arms that had been in use since 1848, though these arms were never officially granted.
