= Wolverhampton =

City in the West Midlands, England

- City and metropolitan borough
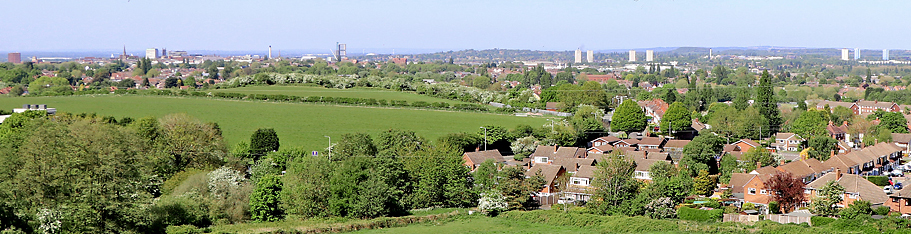
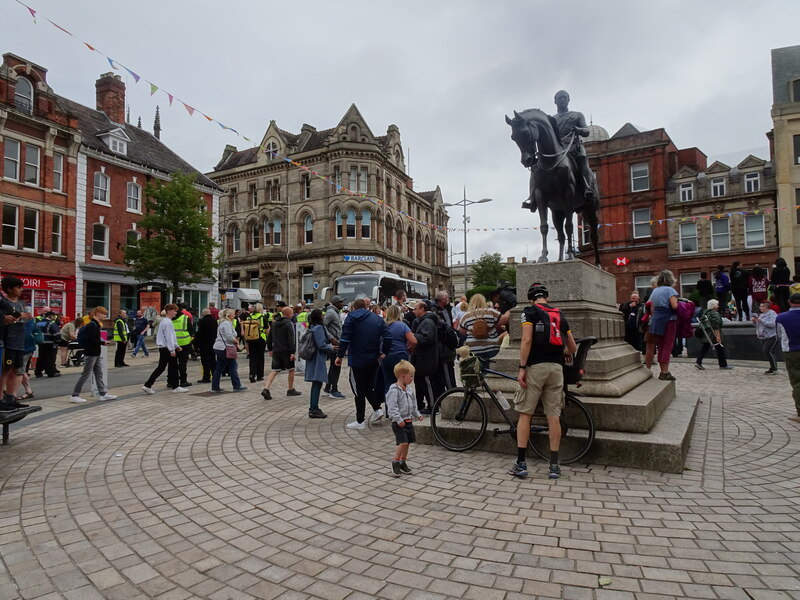
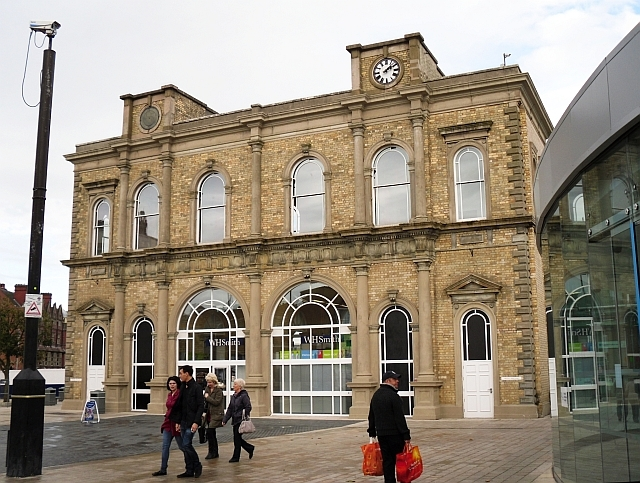
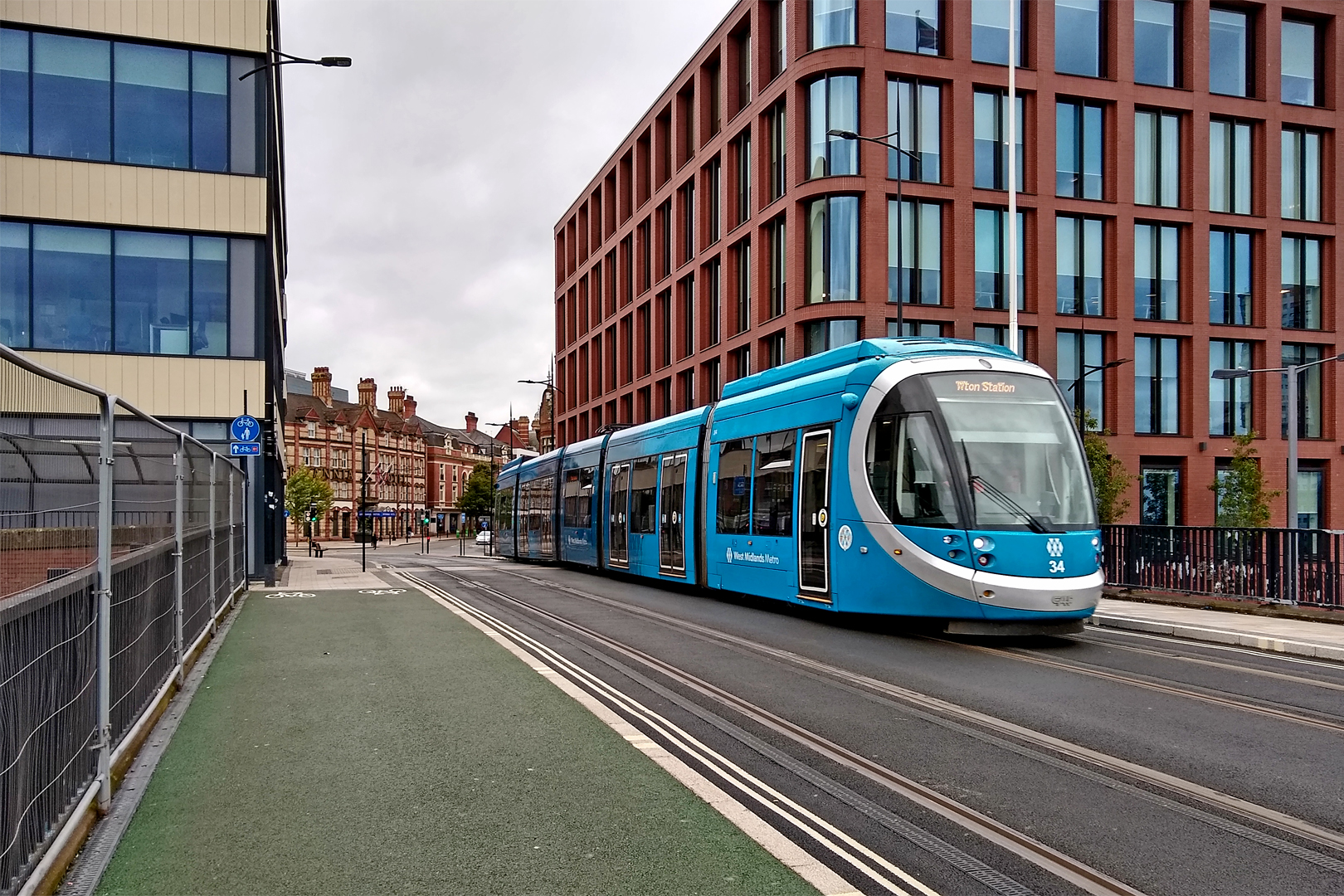
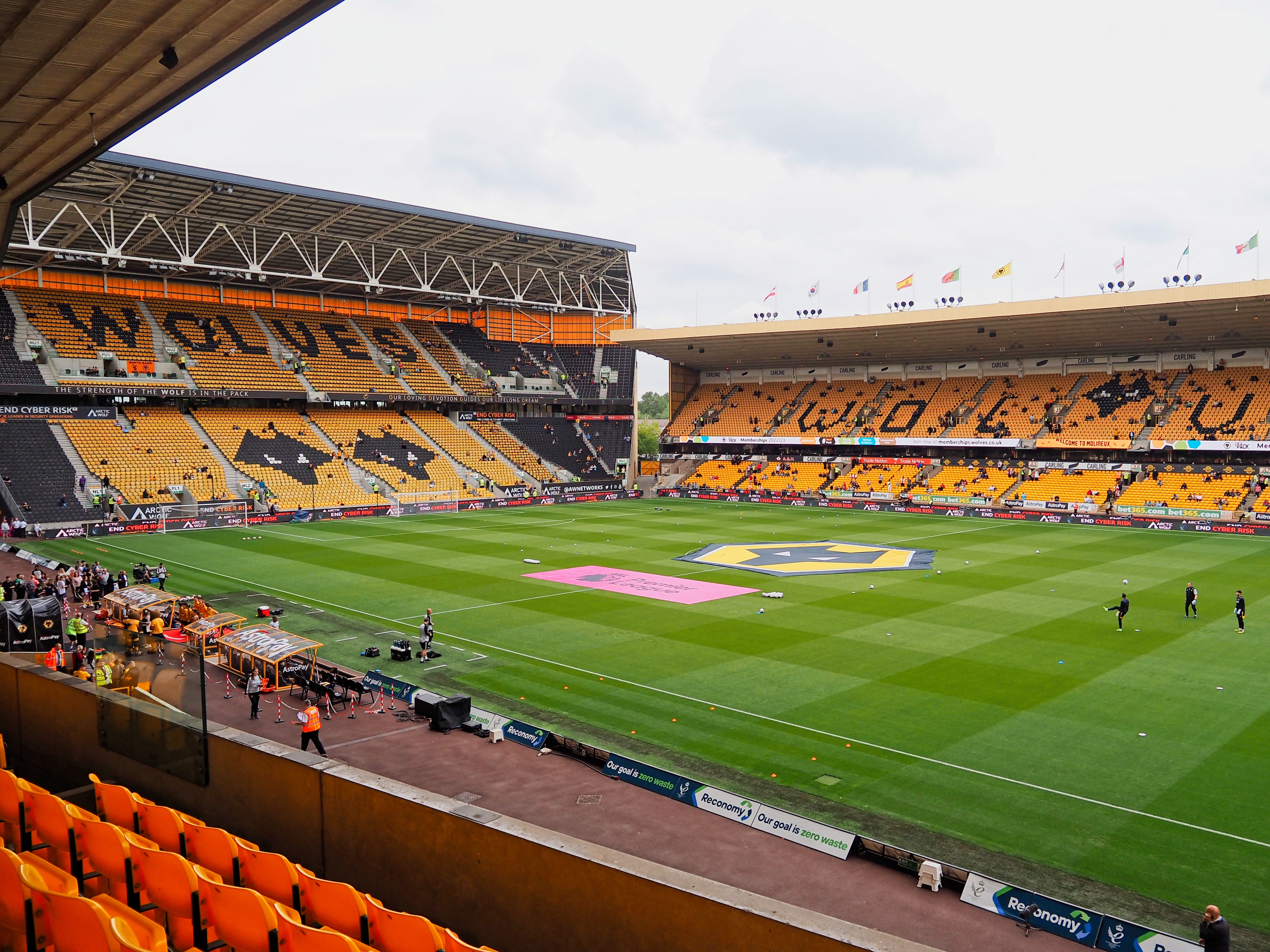
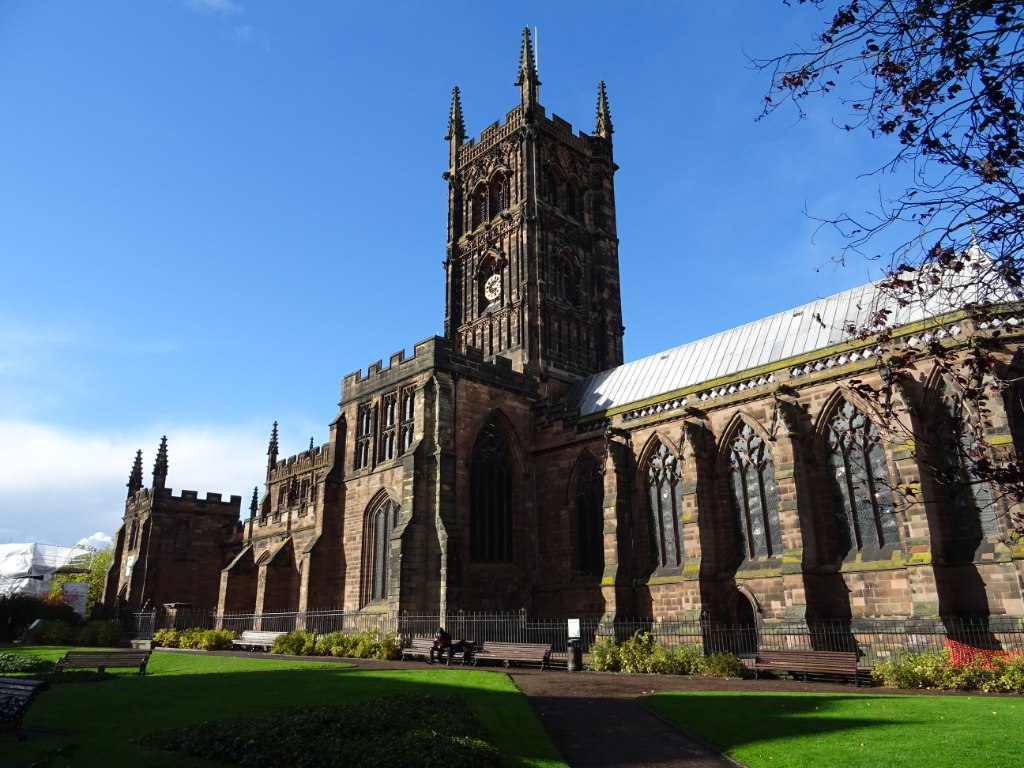
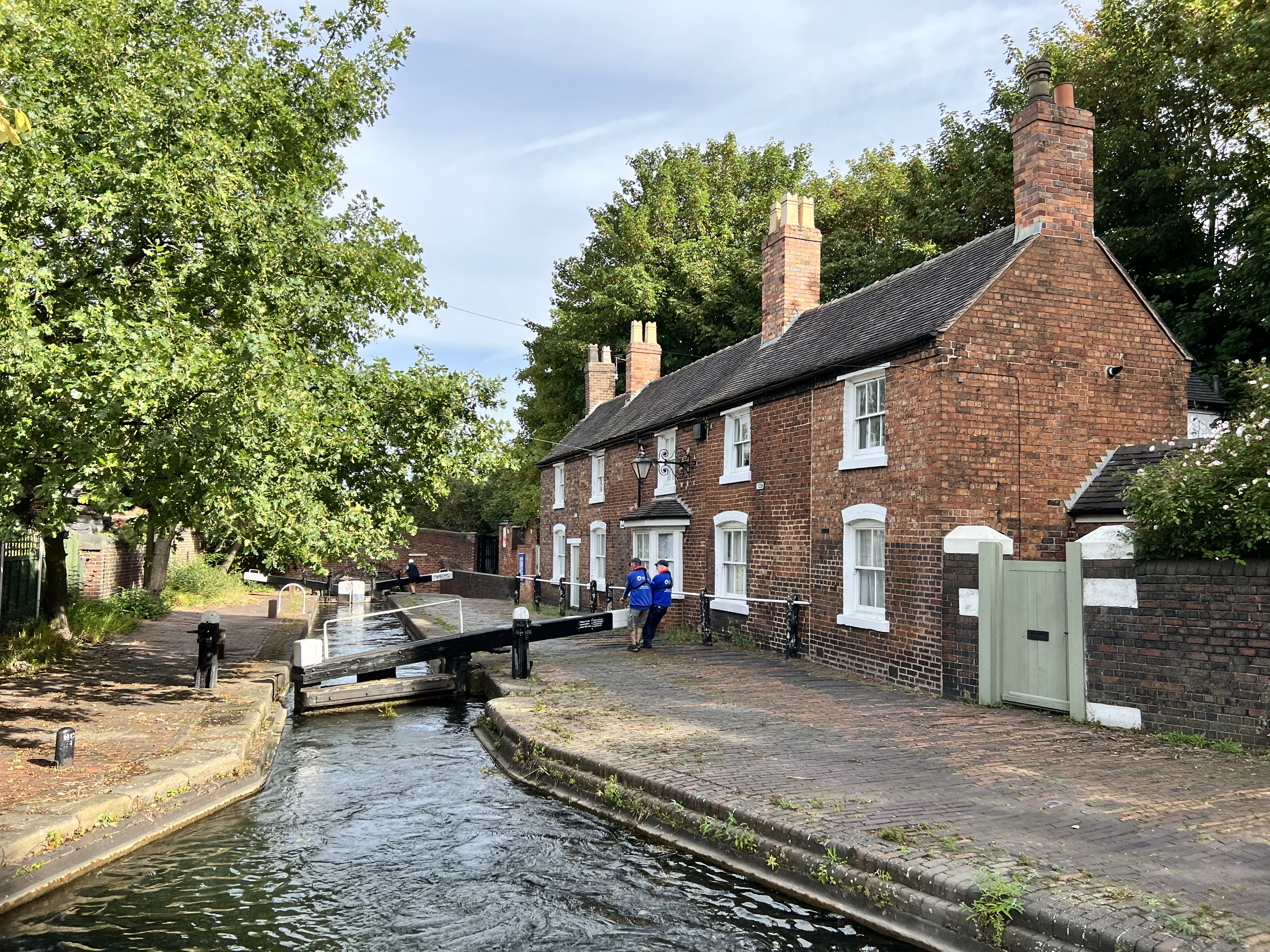
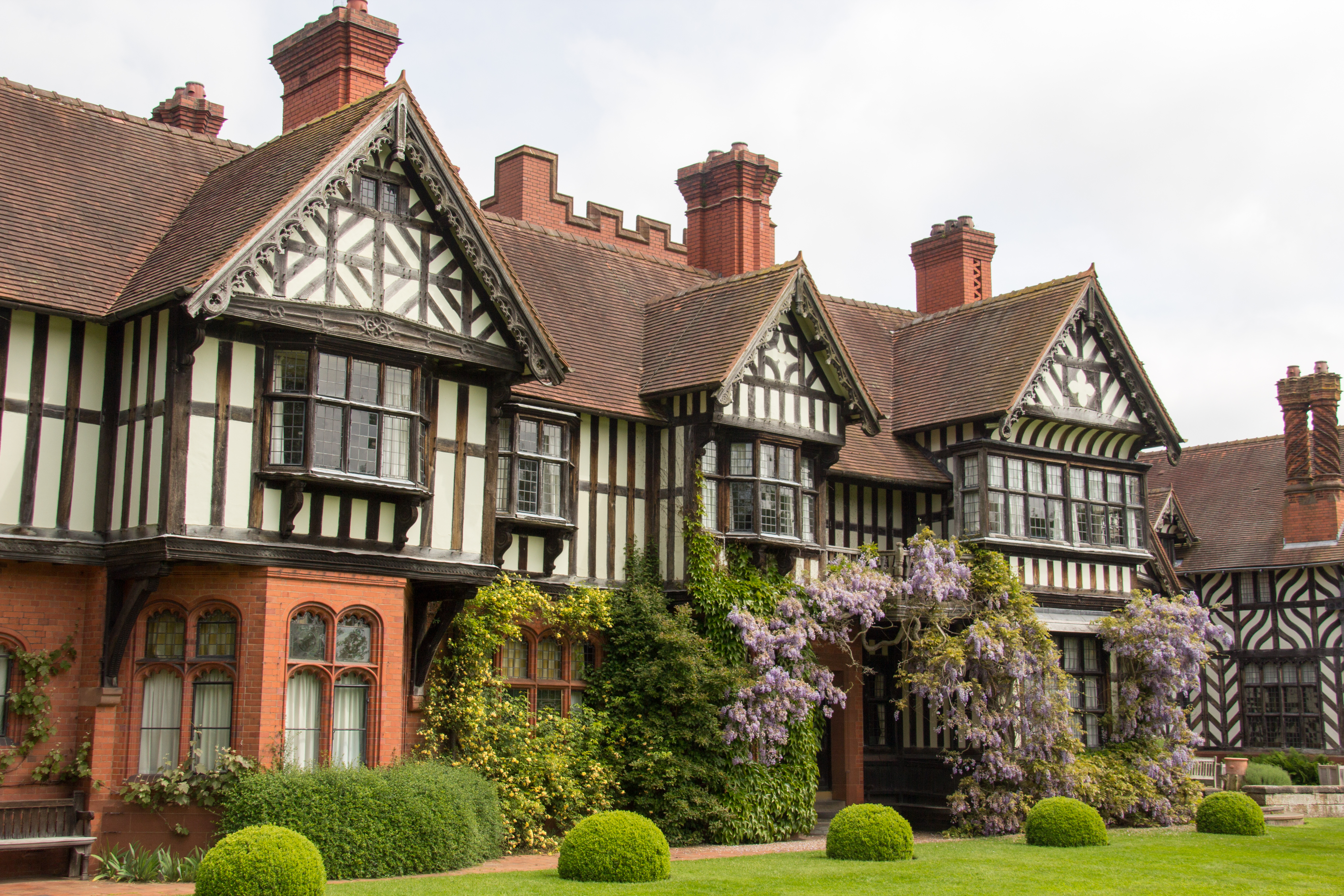
- Wolverhampton Skyline Queen Square Queens Building Metro Molineux Stadium St Peter's Church Birmingham Canal Wightwick Manor

- Coat of arms
- Nicknames: Wolftown; Wolf Town; Wolves; Wolvo
- Motto: Out of darkness cometh light
- The city shown within the West Midlands
- Coordinates: 52°35′N 2°08′W
- Sovereign state: United Kingdom
- Country: England
- Region: West Midlands
- Metropolitan county: West Midlands
- Historic county: Staffordshire
- Founded: 985
- City: 13 January 2001
- Metropolitan borough: 1 April 1974
- Founder: Lady Wulfruna
- Admin. HQ: Wolverhampton Civic Centre
- Suburbs of the city (within 2 miles): List: Aldersley; All Saints; Blakenhall; Bradmore; Chapel Ash; Claregate; Compton; Deansfield; Dunstall Hill; East Park; Ettingshall; Fallings Park; Gorsebrook; Graiseley; Heath Town; Horseley Fields; Merridale; Monmore Green; Newbridge; Old Fallings; Park Village; Scotlands; Springfield; Stow Heath; Tettenhall (village); Tettenhall Wood; Wednesfield (town); Whitmore Reans

Government
  - Type: Metropolitan borough
  - Governing body: City of Wolverhampton Council
  - Mayor: Paul Singh(C)

Area
  - Total: 26.81 sq mi (69.44 km^{2})
- Elevation: 535 ft (163 m)

Population (2021)
  - Total: 263,700
  - Density: 8,820/sq mi (3,407/km^{2})
- Demonym: Wulfrunian

Ethnicity (2021)
  - Ethnic groups: List: 60.6% White; 21.2% Asian; 9.3% Black; 5.3% Mixed; 3.6% Other

Religion (2021)
  - Religion: List: 43.8% Christianity; 27.8% no religion; 12% Sikhism; 5.5% Islam; 5.5% not stated; 3.7% Hinduism; 1.2% other; 0.3% Buddhism; 0.1% Judaism
- Time zone: UTC+0 (Greenwich Mean Time)
  - Summer (DST): UTC+1 (British Summer Time)
- Postcode: WV
- Area code: 01902
- ISO 3166-2: GB-WLV
- ONS code: 00CW (ONS); E08000031 (GSS)
- OS grid reference: SO915985
- NUTS 3: UKG39
- Website: wolverhampton.gov.uk

Wolverhampton (/ˌwʊlvərˈhæmptən/ WUUL-vər-HAMP-tən) is a city and metropolitan borough, in the West Midlands, England. Located around 12 miles (19 km) north-west of Birmingham, it forms the north-western part of the West Midlands conurbation, with the towns of Willenhall and Walsall to the east, and the towns of Sedgley and Dudley to the south. The population in 2021 was 263,700, making it the third largest city in the county after Birmingham and Coventry.

Historically in Staffordshire, Wolverhampton grew as a market town specialising in the wool trade. During the Industrial Revolution, it became a major centre for coal mining, steel production, lock making, and automotive manufacturing; the economy of the city is still based on engineering, including a large aerospace industry and a service sector. The city is home to the University of Wolverhampton. A town for most of its history, it gained city status in 2001. The M6 motorway runs just outside the city's east and north-east borders, while the M54 motorway starts to the north and links the city with Telford. The city is served by Wolverhampton station, while the western terminus of the West Midlands Metro network is also located in the city.

Wolverhampton has produced many notable musicians and artists. It is known in the sports world as the home of EFL Championship football team Wolverhampton Wanderers FC, which plays at Molineux Stadium. As a result of experiencing a heavy influx of Indian immigrants since the 1950s, the city is home to the largest percentage of Sikhs in England, who have been influential in shaping its identity; it also hosts a higher percentage of Hindus than the national average.

== Toponymy ==
The city is named after Wulfrun, who founded the town in 985, from the Anglo-Saxon Wulfrūnehēantūn ('Wulfrūn's high or principal enclosure or farm').

Before the Norman Conquest of 1066, the area's name appears only as variants of Heantune or Hamtun; the prefix Wulfrun or similar appearing in 1070 and thereafter. Alternatively, the city may have earned its original name from Wulfereēantūn ('Wulfhere's high or principal enclosure or farm') after the Mercian King, who according to tradition established an abbey in 659, though no evidence of an abbey has been found. The variation Wolveren Hampton is seen in medieval records, for example in 1381. The Oxford English Dictionary includes the demonym Wulfrunian, defined as "An inhabitant of Wolverhampton", its earliest example of use being from 1959.

== History ==
A local tradition states that King Wulfhere of Mercia founded an abbey of St Mary at Wolverhampton in 659.

Wolverhampton is recorded as being the site of a decisive battle between the unified Mercian Angles and West Saxons against the raiding Danes in 910, although sources are unclear as to whether the battle itself took place in Wednesfield or Tettenhall. Both places have since been incorporated into Wolverhampton. The Mercians and West Saxons claimed a decisive victory, and the field of Woden is recognised by numerous place names in Wednesfield.

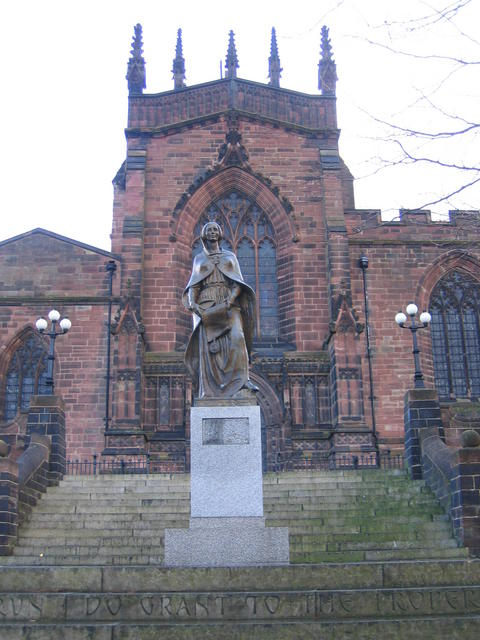
Statue of Lady Wulfrun on western side of St. Peter's Collegiate Church

The Wolverhampton Pillar

In 985, King Ethelred the Unready granted lands at a place referred to as Heantun to Lady Wulfrun by royal charter, and hence founding the settlement.

St Mary's Church was founded in 966, later named St Peters. It is not known if The Wolverhampton Pillar (Note: An Anglo-Saxon wayside cross.) predates that, but probably does. The Pillar is thought to be a Roman column taken from Wroxeter or Wall (Letocetum). In 994, a monastery was consecrated there in Wolverhampton for which Wulfrun granted land at Upper Arley in Worcestershire, Bilston, Willenhall, Wednesfield, Pelsall, Ogley Hay near Brownhills, Hilton near Wall, Hatherton, Kinvaston, Hilton near Wolverhampton and Featherstone. This became the site for the current St. Peter's Church. A statue of Lady Wulfrun, sculpted by Sir Charles Wheeler, can be seen on the stairs outside the church.

Wolverhampton is recorded in the Domesday Book in 1086 as being in the Hundred of Seisdon and the county of Staffordshire. The lords of the manor are listed as the canons of St Mary, (Note: The church's dedication was changed to St Peter after this date.) with the tenant-in-chief being Samson, William the Conqueror's personal chaplain. Wolverhampton at this date is a large settlement of fifty households.

In 1179, there is mention of a market held in the town, and, in 1204, it had come to the attention of King John that the town did not possess a Royal Charter for holding a market. This charter for a weekly market held on a Wednesday was eventually granted on 4 February 1258 by Henry III.

It is held that in the 14th and 15th centuries that Wolverhampton was one of the "staple towns" of the woollen trade, which can be seen today by the inclusion of a woolpack on the city's coat of arms, and by the many small streets, especially in the city centre, called "Fold", (Note: Examples being Blossom's Fold, Farmers Fold, Townwell Fold and Victoria Fold.) as well as Woolpack Street and Woolpack Alley.

In 1512, Sir Stephen Jenyns, a former Lord Mayor of London and a twice Master of the Worshipful Company of Merchant Taylors, who was born in the city, founded Wolverhampton Grammar School, one of the oldest active schools in Britain.

From the 16th century onwards, Wolverhampton became home to a number of metal industries, including lock and key making, and iron and brass working.

Wolverhampton suffered two great fires: the first in April 1590 and the second in September 1696. Both fires started in today's Salop Street. The first fire lasted for five days and left nearly 700 people homeless, whilst the second destroyed 60 homes in the first five hours. This second fire led to the purchase of the first fire engine within the city in September 1703.

On 27 January 1606, two farmers, Thomas Smart and John Holyhead of Rowley Regis, were executed on High Green, now Queen Square, for sheltering two of the Gunpowder Plotters, Robert Wintour and Stephen Littleton, who had fled to the Midlands. The pair played no part in the original plot nevertheless suffered a traitor's death of being hanged, drawn and quartered on butcher's blocks set up in the square a few days before the execution of Guy Fawkes and several other plotters in London.

There is evidence that Wolverhampton may have been the location of the first working Newcomen Steam Engine in 1712.

=== 19th century ===
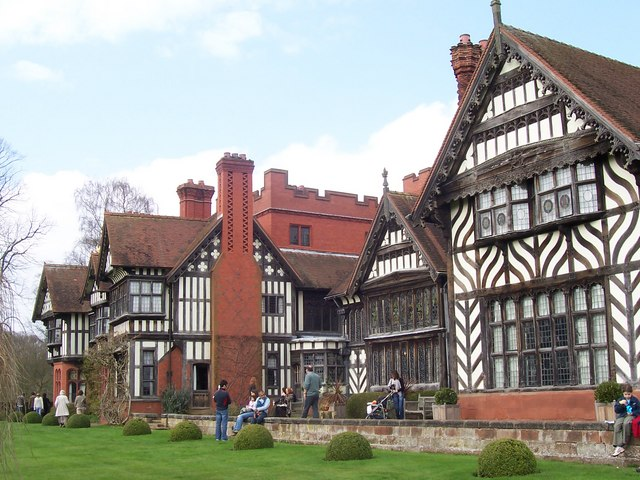
Wightwick Manor

A few years before she began her reign, Queen Victoria visited Wolverhampton in the 1830s and described it as "a large and dirty town", but one that received her "with great friendliness and pleasure." In Victorian times, Wolverhampton grew to be a wealthy town mainly due to the huge amount of industry that occurred as a result of the abundance of coal and iron deposits in the area. The remains of this wealth can be seen in local houses such as Wightwick Manor and The Mount (both built for the prominent varnish and paint manufacturers, the Mander family) as well as Tettenhall Towers. All three are located in the western fringe of Wolverhampton, in the areas known as Wightwick and Tettenhall. Many other houses of similar stature were demolished in the 1960s and 1970s.

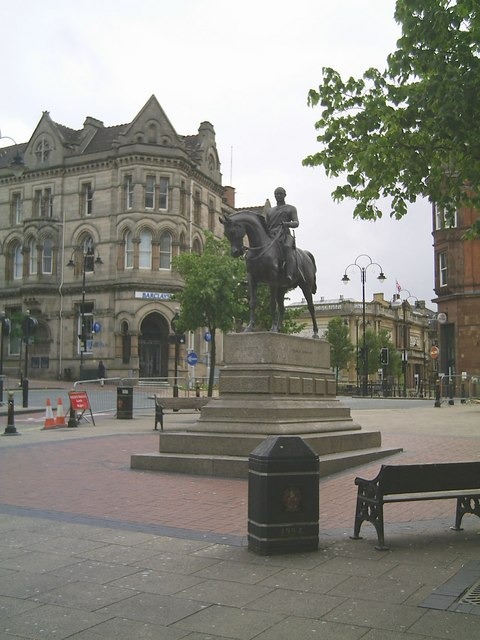
Statue of Prince Albert in Queen Square

Wolverhampton gained its first parliamentary representation as part of the Reform Act 1832, when it was one of 22 large towns that were allocated two members of Parliament. A local mob attacking electors who voted or intended to vote for the Tory candidate led to the 1835 Wolverhampton riot, with dragoons being called in to end the intimidation. Wolverhampton was incorporated as a municipal borough on 15 March 1848, under the Municipal Corporations Act 1835, before becoming a county borough in 1889. It was represented politically in Victorian times by Charles Pelham Villiers, a Liberal MP and noted free trade supporter who was also the longest-serving MP in parliamentary history. Lord Wolverhampton, Henry Hartley Fowler was MP for Wolverhampton at the turn of the century.

The railways reached Wolverhampton in 1837, with the first station located at Wednesfield Heath, now Heath Town, on the Grand Junction Railway. This station was demolished in 1965, but the area exists as a nature reserve just off Powell Street.

Wolverhampton railway works was established in 1849 for the Shrewsbury and Birmingham Railway and became the Northern Division workshop of the Great Western Railway in 1854.

In the 19th century, the city saw much immigration from Wales and Ireland; the latter following the Great Famine. In 1866, a statue was erected in memory of Prince Albert the Prince Consort, the unveiling of which brought Queen Victoria back to Wolverhampton. The unveiling of the statue was the first public appearance Queen Victoria made after the funeral of her husband. A 40-foot-tall (12 m) archway made of coal was constructed for the visit. The Queen was so pleased with the statue that she knighted Wolverhampton's mayor at the time, an industrialist named John Morris. Market Square, originally named High Green, was renamed Queen Square in honour of the visit. The statue replaced a Russian cannon captured during the Siege of Sevastopol in 1855, and remains standing in Queen Square. The statue is known locally as "The Man on the Horse".

The Stafford Street drill hall was completed in 1890.

=== 20th century ===
Wolverhampton had a prolific bicycle industry from 1868 to 1975, during which time a total of more than 200 bicycle manufacturing companies existed; these included Viking, Marston, Sunbeam, Star, Wulfruna and Rudge. The last volume manufacturers of bicycles left Wolverhampton during the 1960s and 1970s, whose team dominated the UK's racing scene in the 1950s. (Note: Viking's production of hand-built lightweight racing and juvenile bicycles exceeded 20,000 units in 1965.) Closures of other smaller cycle makers followed during the 1980s, including well-known hand-builders such as the former professional cyclist Percy Stallard and Jack Hateley.

The current main railway station, initially known as Wolverhampton High Level opened in 1852, but the original station was demolished in 1965 and then rebuilt. Wolverhampton Low Level opened on the Great Western Railway in 1855. The site of the Low Level station, which closed to passengers in 1972 and completely in 1981, has since been redeveloped with much of the original station incorporated into a hotel.

In 1918, at The Mount in Tettenhall Wood, British prime minister David Lloyd George announced a general election. He also made his Homes fit for heroes speech at Wolverhampton Grand Theatre in the same year. It was on the idea of Homes fit for heroes that Lloyd George was to fight the 1918 General Election.

Mass council housing development in Wolverhampton, to rehouse families from slum housing, began after the end of the World War I. New estates at Parkfields (near the border with Coseley) and Birches Barn (Note: Near Bantock Park, in the west of Wolverhampton.) gave the city some 550 new council houses by 1923, although this was a fraction of the number required. The first large council housing development in Wolverhampton was the Low Hill estate to the north-east of the city, which consisted of more than 2,000 new council houses by 1927 and was one of the largest housing estates in Britain at the time. Mass council housing development in Wolverhampton continued into the 1930s, mostly in the north of the city in the Oxley and Wobaston areas and on the new Scotlands Estate in the north-east. However, council house building halted in 1940, following the outbreak of World War II in September the previous year.

Wolverhampton St George's, in the city centre, was the northern terminus for the West Midlands Metro light rail system, now terminating at Wolverhampton station. An extension opened in 2023,with the opening being delayed until the new railway station was completed. Wolverhampton was one of the few towns to operate surface contact trams and the only town to use the Lorain Surface Contact System. Trolleybuses appeared in 1923 and, for a brief period in 1930, the Wolverhampton trolleybus system was the world's largest trolleybus system. The last Wolverhampton trolleybus ran in 1967, just as the railway line through the High Level station was converted to electric operation.

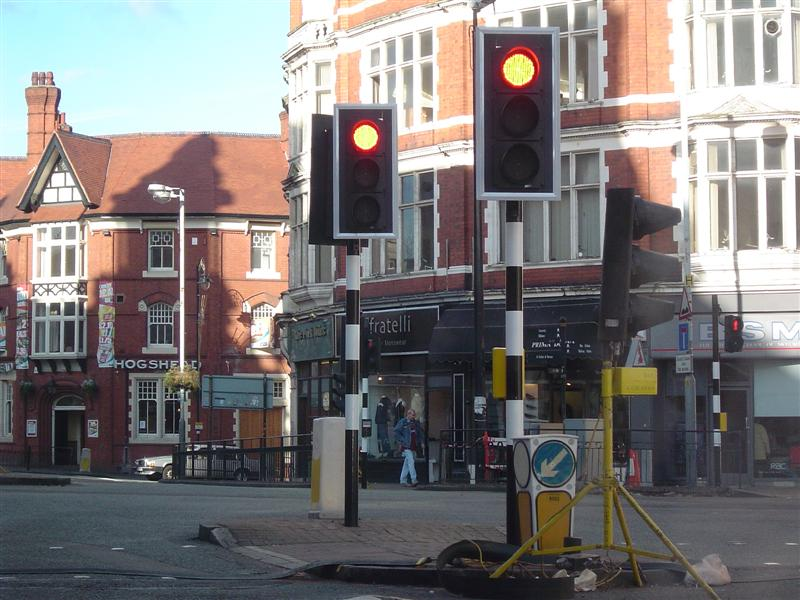
The location of the UK's first set of traffic lights at Princes Square; the poles are painted with black and white bands, as they were originally

England's first automatic traffic lights could be seen in Princes Square in 1927; the modern traffic lights at this location have the traditional striped poles to commemorate this. Princes Square was also the location of the UK's first pedestrian safety barriers, which were erected in 1934. On 2 November 1927, the A4123 New Road was opened by Prince of Wales (later Edward VIII) linking the city with Birmingham. The New Road was designed as an unemployment relief project and was the UK's first purpose-built inter-city highway of the 20th century.

Sir Geoffrey Le Mesurier Mander, a member of the Mander family, was Liberal MP for Wolverhampton East from 1929 to 1945, distinguished for his stance against appeasement and as a supporter of the League of Nations; he was known as "the last of the Midland radicals." More recent members have included the Conservative mavericks Enoch Powell and Nicholas Budgen. Powell was a member of Edward Heath's shadow cabinet from 1964, until he was dismissed in April 1968 following his controversial Rivers of Blood speech, in which he warned of massive civil unrest if mass immigration of black and Asian Commonwealth inhabitants continued. At the same period, Sikh bus drivers and conductors were demonstrating in Wolverhampton against the Transportation Committee's regulations requiring uniform caps and thus prohibiting turbans. In 2005, former Bilston councillor and MP for Wolverhampton South East, Dennis Turner entered the House of Lords as Lord Bilston.

Following the end of World War II in 1945, the council erected 400 prefabricated bungalows across Wolverhampton and built its first permanent post-war houses at the Underhill Estate near Bushbury in the late 1940s. The 1950s saw many new houses and flats built across Wolverhampton as the rehousing programme from the slums continued, as well as the local council agreeing deals with neighbouring authorities Wednesfield Urban District and Seisdon Rural District which saw families relocated to new estates in those areas. The 1960s saw the rehousing programme continue, with multi-storey blocks being built on a large scale across Wolverhampton at locations including Blakenhall, Whitmore Reans and Chetton Green. The later part of the decade saw the Heath Town district almost completely redeveloped with multi-storey flats and maisonette blocks. By 1975, by which time Wolverhampton had also taken in the majority of the Borough of Bilston, the Urban Districts of Wednesfield and Tettenhall and parts of Willenhall, Sedgley and Coseley, almost a third of Wolverhampton's population lived in council housing but, since that date, social housing has been built on a minimal scale in the area and some of the 1919–1975 developments have since been demolished.

As well as the many new council estates, which sprang up around Wolverhampton during the 20th century, several older parts of the town were redeveloped for new council housing during the 1960s and early 1970s. The most notable example is the Heath Town area, where almost all of the 19th-century buildings were demolished during the 1960s, and replaced by four tower blocks and several blocks of maisonettes. However, the state housing at Heath Town quickly became unpopular and, by the 1980s, the area was plagued with crime and unemployment. The first regeneration projects on the estate began during the 1990s and, in 2017, some of the maisonette blocks were demolished. A similar redevelopment took place around the same time in Blakenhall, where new shops and five tower blocks were built in a 1960s redevelopment area. However, all of these buildings were demolished between 2002 and 2011; they have since been replaced with new private and social housing.

Large numbers of black and Asian immigrants settled in Wolverhampton from the 1950s and 1960s, mostly in the Blakenhall, All Saints, Whitmore Reans and Heath Town areas. Wolverhampton is home to a large Sikh community, who settled there during the period (1935–1975) from the Indian state of Punjab. Today, the Sikh community in Wolverhampton forms approximately 12% of the city's population.

In 1974, as a result of local government reorganisation, Wolverhampton became a metropolitan borough, transferring from the ceremonial Staffordshire into the newly formed county of the West Midlands; though as a County Borough, it was never administered by Staffordshire County Council. Wolverhampton was granted city status, announced on 18 December 2000 and was formally conferred on 31 January 2001 – an honour that had been unsuccessfully applied for in 1953, 1966, 1977, 1985 and 1992 – making it one of three Millennium Cities. Wolverhampton also made an unsuccessful application for a lord mayor in 2002.

Many of the city centre's buildings date from the early 20th century and before; the oldest buildings being St Peter's Church (Note: St Peters Church was built in the 13th century, but has been largely extended and refurbished since the 15th century, situated on Lichfield Street.) and a framed timber 17th-century building on Victoria Street, which is now one of just two remaining in the area which was heavily populated by them until the turn of the 20th century. This building was originally a residential property, but later became the Hand Inn public house; later, it became Lindy Lou's children's shop and still called "Lindy Lou's" by locals. It carries a false date of 1300 AD, fitted during a past refurbishment. It was completely restored in 1981, after a two-year refurbishment project and has been used by several businesses since then, including as a second-hand book shop.

On 23 November 1981, an F1/T2 tornado touched down in Fordhouses to the north of Wolverhampton, and later moved over Wolverhampton city centre and surrounding suburbs, causing some damage.

The Wolverhampton Ring Road circumnavigates the city centre linking the majority of the city's radial routes. It was constructed in sections between 1960 and 1986, and carries the number A4150, although this is only marked on one road sign.

The centre of Wolverhampton has been altered radically since the mid-1960s, with the Mander Centre (Note: Plans for which were unveiled on 15 April 1965.) being opened in two phases, the first in 1968 and the second in 1971. Several refurbishments have taken place since. The Wulfrun Centre, an open shopping area, was opened alongside the Mander Centre's first phase in 1968, but has been undercover since a roof was added in the late 1990s.

Central Wolverhampton police station was built just south of the city centre on Birmingham Road during the 1960s; operations there were cut back in the early 1990s when a new larger police station was built on Bilston Street, on land that became vacant a decade earlier on the demolition of a factory along with a number of shops and the Clifton Cinema. It was officially opened by Diana, Princess of Wales, on 31 July 1992.

The city centre had several cinemas during the 20th century, including the Odeon cinema. The last of these was the ABC Cinema, formerly the Savoy, which closed in 1991 after 54 years. It was then converted into a nightclub, with part of the site being converted into the offices of a recruitment agency in 2005. The building was demolished in 2019 to make way for an extension to the City of Wolverhampton College's Metro One campus.

A modern landmark in the city centre is the Wolverhampton Combined Court Centre on Pipers Row, which opened in 1990 as the town's first purpose-built crown court.

=== 21st century ===
A few department store chains, including Marks & Spencer and Next, have stores in the centre of Wolverhampton. Beatties, a House of Fraser store, was announced to close in 2019. Debenhams opened a three-floor department store in the Mander Centre in 2017, but has now closed.

In 2021, a blue plaque was erected in memory of British immigrant rights activist Paulette Wilson, a member of the Windrush generation. The plaque was launched with campaigners including Patrick Vernon and Claire Darke at the Wolverhampton Heritage Centre. The centre is a cornerstone of the area's local Caribbean community and was formerly the constituency office of Enoch Powell, where his Rivers of Blood speech was written.

==== Ministry of Housing, Communities and Local Government ====
On 20 February 2021, it was announced as part of the Government's levelling up strategy, that the Department for Levelling Up, Housing and Communities (Note: It is now the Ministry of Housing, Communities and Local Government.) would be the first government department to have a headquarters based outside of London. Five hundred posts, including those of senior civil servants, were scheduled to move to Wolverhampton by 2025. The Secretary of State, Robert Jenrick, officially opened the Ministry's new offices in the i9 building at the city's public transport interchange development on 10 September 2021.

=== Art and culture ===
From the 18th century, Wolverhampton was well known for production of japanned ware and steel jewellery. The renowned 18th- and 19th-century artists Joseph Barney (1753–1832), Edward Bird (1772–1819) and George Wallis (1811–1891) were all born in the city and initially trained as japanned ware painters.

The School of Practical Art was opened in the 1850s and eventually became a close associate of the Art Gallery. Among its students and teachers were Robert Jackson Emerson, Sir Charles Wheeler (Note: Wheeler was Emerson's most famous pupil and the sculptor of the fountains in Trafalgar Square.) and Sara Page, who established her studio in Paris.

Wolverhampton Art Gallery was established in 1884, whilst Wolverhampton Grand Theatre was opened in 1894.

There is a Creative Industries Quarter in Wolverhampton, just off Broad Street, with facilities ranging from the newly opened Slade Rooms, to the art house cinema the Light House Media Centre (closed in 2022) and the Arena Theatre, which is part of the University of Wolverhampton.

Wolverhampton has a strong history in the ornate cast iron safe painting industry from the Victorian era. Numerous companies, such as Chubb Lock and Safe Company, expanded its artistic status to international reputation, whereby a safe became a work of art with fine script and hand-painted designs. The Chubb Building was converted into a National Historic Registered Landmark Treasure in 1992, which now houses a cinema, art galleries, nightclub, business offices and a large stained glass rotunda in its foyer. It is among the few canal street factories in the Black Country that has been preserved.

Wolverhampton's biggest public art display took place between July and September 2017; Wolves in Wolves saw the installation of 30 wolf sculptures in the city centre and West Park, with many of the sculptures auctioned off to raise money for charity.

=== Exhibitions ===
As its wealth and influence grew, Wolverhampton both took part in notable exhibitions and hosted them. The Great Exhibition of 1851, at The Crystal Palace, had examples of locks, japanned ware, enamel ware and papier-mâché products all manufactured in Wolverhampton.

Following successful exhibitions at Mechanics' Institutes in Manchester and many northern towns, Wolverhampton held an exhibition that was the brain child of George Wallis, an artist employed by the firm of Ryton and Walton. The exhibition was held in the Mechanics' Institute in Queen Street and showed fine art, furniture, and decorated trays, as well as a variety of ironwork, locks and steel toys.

On 11 May 1869 The Earl Granville opened the Exhibition of Staffordshire Arts and Industry in a temporary building in the grounds of Molineux House.

The largest and most ambitious exhibition was the Arts and Industrial Exhibition which took place in 1902. Although housing only one international pavilion, from Canada, the scope and scale of the exhibition mirrored all the advances in other exhibitions of its time. The exhibition site featured several halls housing machinery, industrial products, a concert hall, two bandstands, a restaurant and a fun fair with thrill rides and a water chute. Its opening, by the Duke of Connaught, was received with hopeful enthusiasm, unfortunately not matched by the weather, which contributed to a £30,000 loss, equivalent to nearly £2 million at today's value.

== Geography ==
Wolverhampton lies 13 miles (21 km) north-west of its larger near-neighbour Birmingham and forms the second largest part of the West Midlands conurbation. To the north and west lies the Staffordshire and Shropshire countryside.

Wolverhampton city centre falls outside of the area traditionally known as the Black Country, although some areas such as the town and former borough of Bilston and Heath Town, and the Willenhall side of Wolverhampton, fall within the Black Country coalfields, leading to confusion as to whether the entire city falls within the region. Modern usage has tended towards using the term to refer to the western part of the West Midlands, excluding Birmingham, Solihull and Coventry. Examples would be UK Government regional bodies such as the Black Country Development Corporation, under whose remit the city fell.

The city lies upon the Midlands Plateau at 163 metres (535 ft) above sea level. There are no major rivers within the city, although the rivers Penk and Tame (Note: These are tributaries of the river Trent.) rise in the city, as does Smestow Brook, a tributary of the Stour, and thence the Severn. This means that the city lies astride the main east–west watershed of England.

The geology of the city is complex, with a combination of Triassic and Carboniferous geology; specifically Bunter and Keuper sandstone, and Upper and Middle Coal measures. There is an area of dolerite intrusions.

=== Climate ===
Like the rest of central England, Wolverhampton's climate is oceanic (Köppen Cfb) and therefore quite temperate, with average maximum temperatures in July being around 21 °C (70 °F), and with the maximum daytime temperature in January being around 6.9 °C (44.4 °F).

The Met Office's nearest observation station is at Penkridge, about 10 miles (16 km) north of the city.

Climate data for Wolverhampton (1981–2010)
Month	Jan	Feb	Mar	Apr	May	Jun	Jul	Aug	Sep	Oct	Nov	Dec	Year
Record high °C (°F)	14 (57)	18 (64)	21 (70)	25 (77)	27 (81)	31 (88)	35 (95)	35 (95)	28 (82)	28 (82)	21 (70)	16 (61)	35 (95)
Mean daily maximum °C (°F)	6.9 (44.4)	7.3 (45.1)	10.1 (50.2)	12.8 (55.0)	16.2 (61.2)	19.1 (66.4)	21.5 (70.7)	21.1 (70.0)	18.2 (64.8)	14 (57)	10 (50)	7.2 (45.0)	13.7 (56.7)
Mean daily minimum °C (°F)	1.5 (34.7)	1.2 (34.2)	2.9 (37.2)	4 (39)	6.8 (44.2)	9.6 (49.3)	11.7 (53.1)	11.5 (52.7)	9.6 (49.3)	6.9 (44.4)	3.9 (39.0)	1.6 (34.9)	5.9 (42.7)
Record low °C (°F)	−13 (9)	−13 (9)	−11 (12)	−6 (21)	−3 (27)	−1 (30)	3 (37)	3 (37)	−1 (30)	−7 (19)	−10 (14)	−15 (5)	−15 (5)
Average rainfall mm (inches)	58.2 (2.29)	39.7 (1.56)	47.6 (1.87)	51.1 (2.01)	55.7 (2.19)	58.5 (2.30)	55.5 (2.19)	59 (2.3)	60.5 (2.38)	67.4 (2.65)	64.5 (2.54)	63.5 (2.50)	681.2 (26.78)
Mean monthly sunshine hours	47.9	65.5	97.5	139.6	179.6	164.2	183.6	168.1	124.9	97.8	57.3	38.3	1,364.3
Source 1:
Source 2: Penkridge extremes (nearest station)

=== Areas of the city ===
As with much of the locality, the majority of areas in Wolverhampton have names that are of Old English (Anglo-Saxon) origin, with a few exceptions such as Penn, (pre-English Brittonic place name) Parkfields, Park Village and Lanesfield. (Note: These are modern place names of the last couple of centuries.)

Localities in the City of Wolverhampton include:

- Aldersley
- All Saints
- Ashmore Park†
- Bilston †
- Blakenhall
- Bradley†
- Bradmore
- Bushbury
- Castlecroft
- Chapel Ash
- Claregate
- Compton
- Coseley (part) †
- Dunstall Hill
- East Park
- Ettingshall†
- Fallings Park
- Finchfield
- Fordhouses
- Goldthorn Park†
- Gorsebrook
- Graiseley
- Heath Town
- Horseley Fields
- Lanesfield†
- Low Hill
- Lower Penn (part) ††
- Merridale
- Merry Hill
- Monmore Green
- Newbridge
- Old Fallings
- Oxley
- Parkfields
- Park Village
- Pendeford
- Penn
- Penn Fields
- Portobello†
- Scotlands Estate
- Stow Heath
- Tettenhall†
- Tettenhall Wood†
- Warstones
- Wednesfield †
- Whitmore Reans
- Wightwick†
- Wood End†
- Woodcross†

Notes
†–Partial Municipal Boroughs or Urban Districts added to Wolverhampton County Borough in 1966 and communities within these. These Urban Districts were split between Wolverhampton and other local authorities. Those parts within the present City of Wolverhampton local council area are considered by the ONS to be part of the Wolverhampton Urban sub-division.
††–Areas within the Wolverhampton Urban Sub-division but administered by South Staffordshire District Council.

=== Nearby places ===
Towns

- Bewdley
- Brewood
- Bridgnorth
- Cannock
- Dudley
- Halesowen
- Kidderminster
- Kingswinford
- Newport
- Rugeley
- Sedgley
- Shifnal
- Shrewsbury
- Solihull
- Stafford
- Stone
- Stourbridge
- Tamworth
- Telford
- Tipton
- Walsall
- Wednesbury
- West Bromwich.

Villages

- Albrighton
- Bilbrook
- Bobbington
- Cheslyn Hay
- Codsall
- Coven
- Essington
- Featherstone
- Great Wyrley
- Himley
- Huntington
- Lower Penn
- Pattingham
- Penkridge
- Perton
- Seisdon
- Shareshill
- Swindon
- Tong
- Trysull
- Weston-under-Lizard
- Wheaton Aston
- Wombourne.

=== Green belt ===
Wolverhampton has green belt within its boundary, as a part of the wider West Midlands Green Belt. This is scattered around the western half of the city, in the form of green wedges, due to it being highly urbanised. The green belt is in place to prevent further urban sprawl and preserve greenfield areas. Areas covered include:

- Moseley Parklands
- Land by Grassy Lane at Wood Hayes
- Ashmore Park
- Goldthorn/Lower Penn Green
- Holy Trinity Church, Ettingshall Park
- The Grange, Wergs
- Beacon Hill Cemetery
- Land south of Pattingham
- Aldersley School
- Perton Road/Boundary Farm
- South Staffs Golf Course
- Highfields School
- Pennwood Lane
- Smestow Valley/Valley Park
- Goldthorn/Lower Penn Green.

== Government ==
The vast majority of Wolverhampton is governed locally by City of Wolverhampton Council, although some smaller parts of the urban area are governed by South Staffordshire District Council.

The area administered by the city council is represented in the national United Kingdom parliament by three MPs in three constituencies: Wolverhampton West, Wolverhampton South East and Wolverhampton North East; those administered by South Staffordshire District Council are:South Staffordshire constituency.

=== City of Wolverhampton Council ===
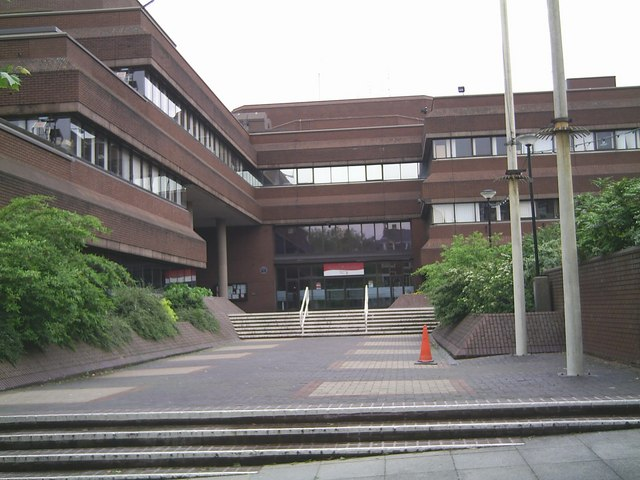
Wolverhampton Civic Centre

The City of Wolverhampton is a metropolitan borough, with its city council acting as a single-tier unitary authority. South Staffordshire District Council is a two-tier authority, with some services provided by Staffordshire County Council.

The council offices are in the Wolverhampton Civic Centre, which is located in St Peter's Square in the city centre. The city council's motto is "Out of darkness cometh light."

The Labour Party currently control the council and have been in majority on the council since 1974, with the exceptions of 1978–1979, 1987, 1992–1994 and 2008–2010. Labour won 47 out of 60 council seats in 2023.

=== Civic history ===
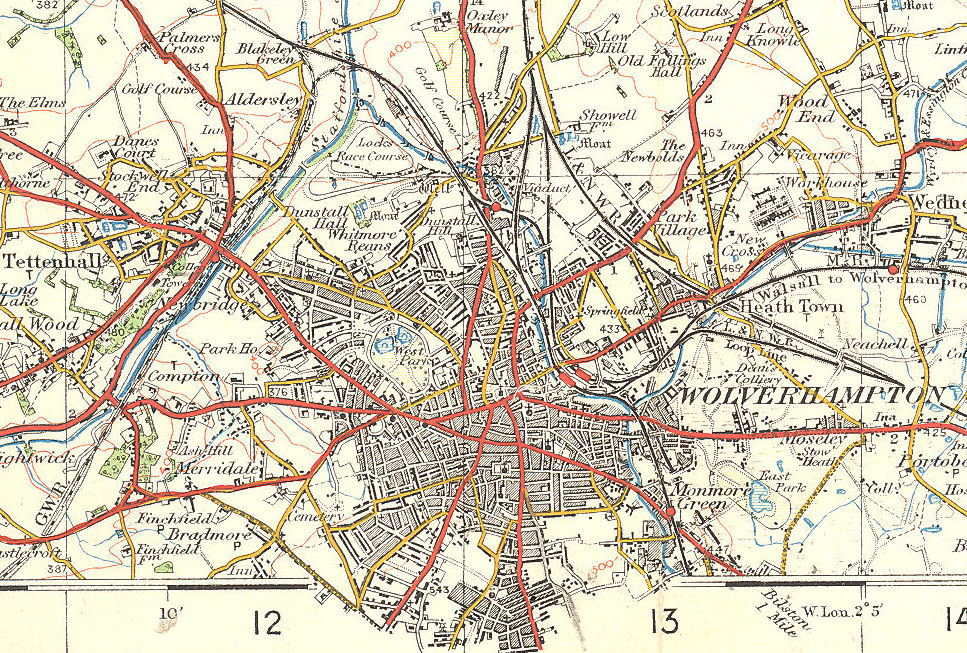
Wolverhampton in 1921

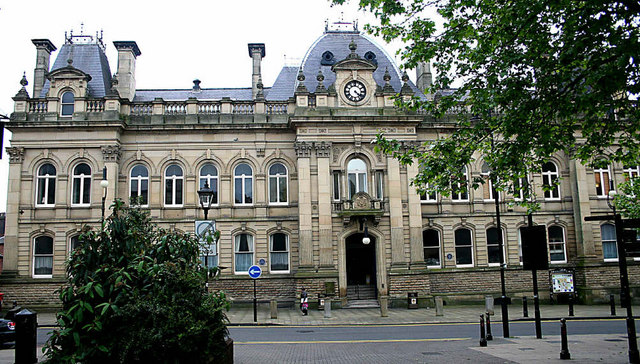
The old Town Hall (magistrates court)

Wolverhampton gained the beginnings of modern local government in 1777, when the Wolverhampton Improvement Act was passed by Parliament. This allowed for the establishment of 125 Town Commissioners who undertook a variety of local improvement work, such as punishing bear baiting, improving drainage and widening streets. By the end of the century, street lighting had been provided at every street corner and over the doorway of every inn; the water supply had been improved by the sinking of ten new wells and the provision of a great water tank in the market place. Policing had been improved with the appointment of ten watchmen and attempts were also made to regulate the markets and inspect hazardous food.

Wolverhampton parliamentary borough was created by the Reform Act 1832, which included areas currently located with the Metropolitan Boroughs of Dudley, Walsall and Sandwell, such as Wren's Nest, New Invention and Sedgley. It was one of 22 large towns that returned two MPs. Under the Redistribution of Seats Act 1885, the original borough was replaced by three new single-member constituencies: Wolverhampton East, Wolverhampton South and Wolverhampton West.

In 1837, Wolverhampton Borough Police was formed. It was disestablished in 1966 and the larger West Midlands Constabulary, which covered not only Wolverhampton but the County Boroughs of Walsall, Dudley, West Bromwich and Warley, took over its duties and was headquartered in the city. This force was then replaced in 1974 with the West Midlands Police.

Wolverhampton was incorporated as a municipal borough in 1848, under the Municipal Corporations Act 1835, and the first meeting of the Council took place on 22 May 1848. The town was then made a County Borough in 1889 under the Local Government Act 1888.

In 1933, the boundaries of the borough expanded, taking in areas from Cannock Rural District and Seisdon Rural District, with very little of the surrounding urban area being affected, with only Heath Town Urban District being abolished.

The bulk of the urban districts of Bilston (a borough itself after 1933), Tettenhall and Wednesfield were added to the borough in 1966, along with the northern section of the urban district of Coseley and parts from the north of Sedgley and the west of Willenhall. The vast majority of these areas were traditionally part of the Parish of Wolverhampton, and were part of the original Parliamentary Borough.

Wolverhampton was one of only two county boroughs (the other being Liverpool) to have no changes made to the boundary during the 1974 reorganisation of local government, the borough already having a population larger than the 250,000 required for education authorities. This contrasted with both the Redcliffe-Maud Report, and the initial White Paper for the 1974 reforms where large areas of the present South Staffordshire district were to be added to the borough. During the 1974 reforms, it was placed within the West Midlands Metropolitan County.

Wolverhampton was also a Royal Peculiar covering a large area.

=== Police ===
The main police station for Wolverhampton is based on Bilston Street in the city centre. Wolverhampton Borough Police became part of West Midlands Constabulary in 1966. Policing is currently delivered by West Midlands Police.

== Demographics ==
Population pyramid of Wolverhampton (borough) in 2021

The 2021 Census gives the Wolverhampton Urban Subdivision as the second largest population in the West Midlands conurbation of 263,727. The proportion of females within the city (50.9%) is slightly higher than that of males (49.1%).

Wolverhampton has an ethnically diverse population; 60.6% of the city's population were White in the 2021 census, 21.2% were Asian, 9.3% were Black, 5.3% were mixed and 3.6% were from another ethnic group.

Wolverhampton had a Christian population of 43.8% in 2021, while the proportion of residents professing no religion was 27.8%. Of religious groupings, Sikhism has the second largest following, accounting for 12% of the population in 2021, increasing from 9.1% in the 2011 census, meaning the city has the largest percentage of Sikhs in England and Wales, and the third largest community numerically. The proportion of people following Islam was 5.5%, whilst Hinduism was followed by 3.7% and Buddhism was 0.3%.

Wolverhampton is within the top 11% of local council areas in England and Wales (excluding London boroughs) for public transport use for travelling to work at 16% of the total. 63% used private transport, either as a driver or passenger, 13% cycled or travelled on foot, whilst 8% worked from home.

Car ownership is lower than the average for England and Wales, with 35.2% of households not owning a car, compared with 26.8% nationally. Single car ownership is in line with national averages (Wolverhampton 42.9%, England and Wales 43.8%), while the proportion of households owning more than one car is lower than the national average.

With Wolverhampton's high British Asian population, the British Muslim, British Hindus and Sikh communities are more numerous than the national average.

=== Population change ===
The tables below detail the population change since 1750, separating that of the city itself and the geographical area now administered by Wolverhampton City Council.

Historical population of Wolverhampton

Year	Pop.	±% p.a.
1750	7,454	—
1801	20,710	+2.02%
1811	29,253	+3.51%
1821	35,816	+2.04%
1831	46,937	+2.74%
1841	68,426	+3.84%

Year	Pop.	±% p.a.
1851	90,301	+2.81%
1861	111,033	+2.09%
1871	68,291	−4.74%
1881	75,766	+1.04%
1891	82,662	+0.87%
1901	94,107	+1.31%

Year	Pop.	±% p.a.
1911	95,328	+0.13%
1921	102,342	+0.71%
1931	133,212	+2.67%
1939	143,213	+0.91%
1951	162,172	+1.04%
1961	150,825	−0.72%

Year	Pop.	±% p.a.
1971	269,168	+5.96%
1981	265,631	−0.13%
1991	257,943	−0.29%
2001	251,462	−0.25%
2011	N/A	—
2021	263,700	—

Source: Issac Taylor's Map 1750 • Township 1801–1881 • Urban Sanitary District 1891 • County Borough 1901–1971 • Urban Subdivision 1981–2011

Historical population of area now administered by Wolverhampton City Council

Year	Pop.	±% p.a.
1750	N/A	—
1801	11,786	—
1811	15,597	+2.84%
1821	19,012	+2.00%
1831	23,067	+1.95%
1841	54,365	+8.95%

Year	Pop.	±% p.a.
1851	70,112	+2.58%
1861	87,254	+2.21%
1871	104,395	+1.81%
1881	121,537	+1.53%
1891	130,868	+0.74%
1901	145,645	+1.08%

Year	Pop.	±% p.a.
1911	162,098	+1.08%
1921	178,068	+0.94%
1931	195,621	+0.94%
1939	214,359	+1.15%
1951	234,893	+0.77%
1961	251,435	+0.68%

Year	Pop.	±% p.a.
1971	269,166	+0.68%
1981	252,474	−0.64%
1991	248,454	−0.16%
2001	236,573	−0.49%
2011	249,470	+0.53%
2015	254,406	+0.49%

Source: Vision of Britain

=== Ethnicity of the borough ===
Ethnic demography of Wolverhampton borough over time

In 1956, a local council estimate of "coloured immigrants" was said to be under 1,000 in Wolverhampton. (Note: Quotation: "Later in 1955, Alderman H. E. Lane, leader of the majority Labour group on the council, set up a council inquiry into the immigrant concentration in the Waterloo Road area, and Lane referred the whole matter to a full-scale inquiry. The results of the inquiry were published in January 1956 (...) which estimated that there were under 1,000 coloured people Wolverhampton.") By 1959, there had arrived 4,000 'coloured immigrants', mostly Jamaicans, into the city (Note: Quotation: "By the 1959 election, therefore, the situation was as follows. Some 4,000 immigrants, mainly Jamaicans from rural backgrounds, had come to live and work in Wolverhampton.") and by the 1966 sample census, 12,700 immigrants from the New Commonwealth existed within the borough. (Note: Quotation: "The sample census of 1966 showed, in the enlarged borough of Wolverhampton, 12,700 people born in the main areas of coloured immigration to Britain — the West Indies, India and Pakistan.")

Ethnic group	1961 estimations (Note: Quotation: "In his report for 1961, Dr Galloway wrote: In 1961, about 30% of admissions on social grounds for confinements came from approximately 3% of the population who are recent (New Commonwealth) immigrants.")		1971 estimations		1981 estimations		1991 census		2001 census		2011 census		2021 census	
Ethnic group	Number	%	Number	%	Number	%	Number	%	Number	%	Number	%	Number	%
White: Total	–	97%	240,313	89.3%	215,659	85%	201,644	81.1%	184,044	77.8%	169,682	68%	159,707	60.5%
White: British	–	–	–	–	–	–	–	–	178,319	75.4%	160,945	64.5%	144,303	54.7%
White: Irish	–	–	–	–	–	–	–	–	2,422		1,526		1,170	0.4%
White: Gypsy or Irish Traveller	–	–	–	–	–	–	–	–	–	–	209		706	0.30%
White: Other	–	–	–	–	–	–	–	–	3,303	1.4%	7,002	2.8%	13,528	5.1%
Asian or Asian British: Total	–	–	–	–	25,744	10.1%	32,289	13%	34,713	14.7%	44,960	18%	55,901	21%
Asian or Asian British: Indian	–	–	–	–	23,184		28,887		29,153	12.3%	32,162	12.9%	42,052	15.9%
Asian or Asian British: Pakistani	–	–	–	–	1,548		2,074		2,931		4,415		6,676	2.5%
Asian or Asian British: Bangladeshi	–	–	–	–	110		187		211		432		531	0.2%
Asian or Asian British: Chinese	–	–	–	–	306		395		843		1,376		802	0.3%
Asian or Asian British: Other Asian	–	–	–	–	596		746		1,575		6,575		5,840	2.2%
Black or Black British: Total	–	–	–	–	10,939	4.3%	12,938	5.2%	10,874	4.6%	17,309	6.9%	24,636	9.3%
Black or Black British: Caribbean	–	–	–	–	8,846		10,364		9,116		9,507		9,905	3.8%
Black or Black British: African	–	–	–	–	283		319		690		4,081		11,158	4.2%
Black or Black British: Other Black	–	–	–	–	1,810		2,255		1,068		3,721		3,573	1.4%
Mixed or British Mixed: Total	–	–	–	–	–	–	–	–	6,441	2.7%	12,784	5.1%	14,065	5.4%
Mixed: White and Black Caribbean	–	–	–	–	–	–	–	–	4,238		8,495		8,495	3.2%
Mixed: White and Black African	–	–	–	–	–	–	–	–	232		554		939	0.4%
Mixed: White and Asian	–	–	–	–	–	–	–	–	1,144		2,160		2,573	1.0%
Mixed: Other Mixed	–	–	–	–	–	–	–	–	827		1,575		2,058	0.8%
Other: Total	–	–	–	–	1,314	0.5%	1,630	0.7%	510	0.2%	4,735	1.9%	9,417	3.6%
Other: Arab	–	–	–	–	–	–	–	–	–	–	359		966	0.4%
Other: Any other ethnic group	–	–	–	–	1,314	0.5%	1,630	0.7%	510	0.2%	4,376	1.8%	8,451	3.2%
Ethnic minority	–	3%	28,853	10.7%	37,997	15%	46,856	18.9%	52,538	22.2%	79,788	32%	96,434	39.5%
Total	–	100%	269,166	100%	253,656	100%	248,500	100%	236,582	100%	249,470	100%	263,726	100%

Religion in Wolves (2021)
1. Christianity (43.9%)
2. No religion (27.8%)
3. Sikhism (12.1%)
4. Islam (5.49%)
5. Hinduism (3.75%)
6. Buddhism (0.35%)
7. Judaism (0.04%)
8. Other Religions (1.20%)
9. Religion not Stated (5.48%)

=== Religion ===
The following table shows the religion of respondents in recent censuses in the city of Wolverhampton.

Religion	2001 Census		2011 Census		2021 Census	
Religion	Number	%	Number	%	Number	%
Christian	157,300	66.49%	138,394	55.48%	115,640	43.85%
Sikh	17,944	7.58%	22,689	9.09%	31,769	12.05%
Muslim	4,060	1.72%	9,062	3.63%	14,489	5.49%
Hindu	9,198	3.89%	9,292	3.72%	9,882	3.75%
Buddhist	737	0.31%	1,015	0.41%	915	0.35%
Jewish	104	0.04%	88	0.04%	94	0.04%
Other religion	511	0.22%	3,057	1.23%	3,158	1.20%
No religion	26,927	11.38%	49,821	19.97%	73,317	27.80%
Religion not stated	19,801	8.37%	16,052	6.43%	14,465	5.48%
Total	236,582	100.00%	249,470	100.00%	263,729	100.00%

== Economy ==
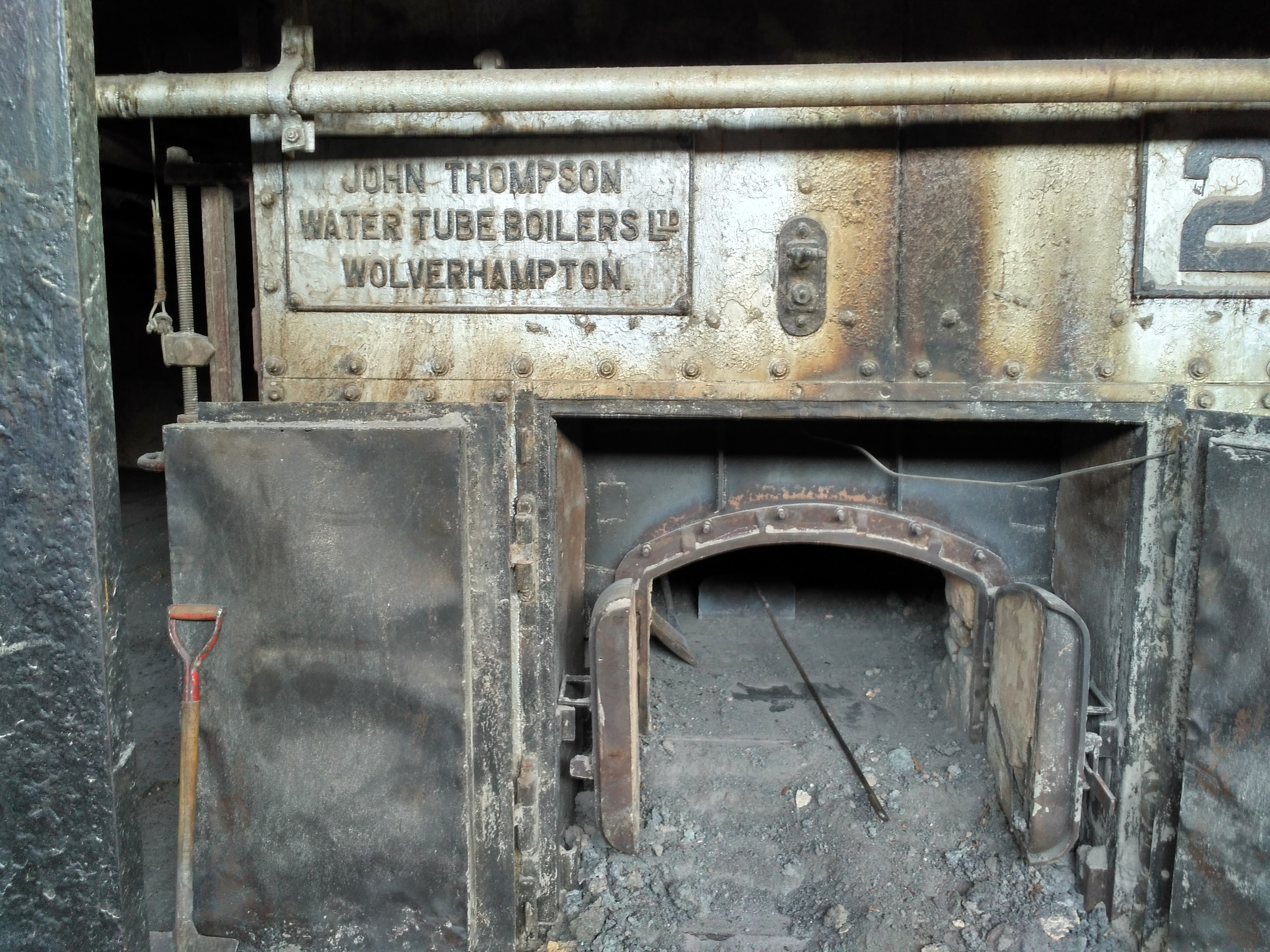
Water-tube boiler made in Wolverhampton

Traditionally, Wolverhampton's economy was dominated by iron, steel, automobiles, engineering and manufacturing industries. Many traditional industries in the city closed or dramatically downsized over the years. By 2008 the economy was dominated by the service sector, at 74.9% of the city's employment. The major parts are public administration, education and health (32.8% of total employment), distribution, hotels and restaurants (21.1%), and finance and IT (12.7%). The largest non-service industry was manufacturing (12.9%), and 5.2% of total employment related to tourism.

The largest single employer within the city is Wolverhampton City Council. which has over 12,000 staff Other large employers within the city include:

- Banking: Birmingham Midshires (headquarters)
- Building materials: Tarmac and Carvers Builders Merchant
- Education: University of Wolverhampton and City of Wolverhampton College
- Construction: Carillion (headquarters), entered liquidation January 2018
- Brewing: Marston's (headquarters)
- Aerospace: H S Marston, MOOG and Goodrich Actuation Systems
- Retail: Beatties (bought by House of Fraser 2005, closed 2019)
- Manufacturing: Chubb Locks, Jaguar Land Rover (Engine Assembly Plant)
- National Health Service (NHS): New Cross Hospital.

=== Jaguar Land Rover ===
In 2014, Jaguar Land Rover opened a £500 million Engine Assembly Plant at the i54 business park. Unveiled by Elizabeth II, the plant produces 2.0-litre 4-cylinder Ingenium diesel and petrol engines. Having already been expanded once before, it was announced in 2015 that the factory would be doubling in size to 200,000 square metres (2,200,000 sq ft), costing $450 million. This expansion would see the workforce double to 1,400.

=== Moog Aircraft Group ===
Moog Aircraft Group operates an aerospace manufacturing facility on Valiant Way in the Pendeford area. The site forms part of the city's advanced manufacturing sector and produces flight control systems for aircraft including the Boeing 777, Boeing 787, Airbus A330 and Airbus A380. The facility employs several hundred staff. The Moog site received media attention in August 2025 when four pro-Palestinian activists were arrested after breaking into the facility and setting off flares, causing over £1 million in damage. The incident required police involvement to secure the manufacturing facility and staff, while legal proceedings against the activists were initiated at the Old Bailey and Birmingham Crown Court.

=== Goodyear ===
Goodyear opened a large factory on Stafford Road, Fordhouses, in 1927. In December 2003, it was announced car tyre production at the plant would be discontinued with the loss of more than 400 jobs; this came after some 2,000 job losses at the plant since 1997. The factory remained open for tyre moulding and tractor tyre production. The factory ceased production at the end of 2016 and closed for good in 2017. The factory buildings were demolished in 2018, with only the clock tower retained.

=== Wolverhampton Wanderers ===
The varied success of Wolverhampton Wanderers since the football club's formation in 1877 has also contributed to the economy of the city. Its greatest successes came between 1949 and 1960, when it won the league title three times and the FA Cup twice, as well as hosting a series of high-profile friendly matches against Europe's leading club sides, also competing in two early editions of the European Cup. During this era, Wolves frequently attracted crowds of between 40,000 and 50,000. The club went on to win the Football League Cup in 1974 and again in 1980, spending all but three seasons outside the top division of English football during the first 35 years of post-war league football, and continued to attract strong crowds.

However, the 1980s saw a sharp decline in the club's fortunes, with three consecutive relegations, a sharp fall in attendances, and debts of more than £2 million which almost put the club out of business. This decline also came at a time when the economy of Wolverhampton was struggling due to the early 1980s recession.

Wolves enjoyed a surge in the late 1980s with two consecutive promotions, thanks largely to the prolific scoring of striker Steve Bull, and an upturn in attendances which also provided a boost to the local economy – as did the club's increased support during the 1990s, during which time the stadium was extensively rebuilt and its facilities improved, with new features including a restaurant and office space. In 2018, Wolves won promotion to the FA Premier League for the third time in 15 years and, a year later, reached its first FA Cup semi-final since 1998. Further redevelopment of the stadium is planned.

=== Tallest buildings ===
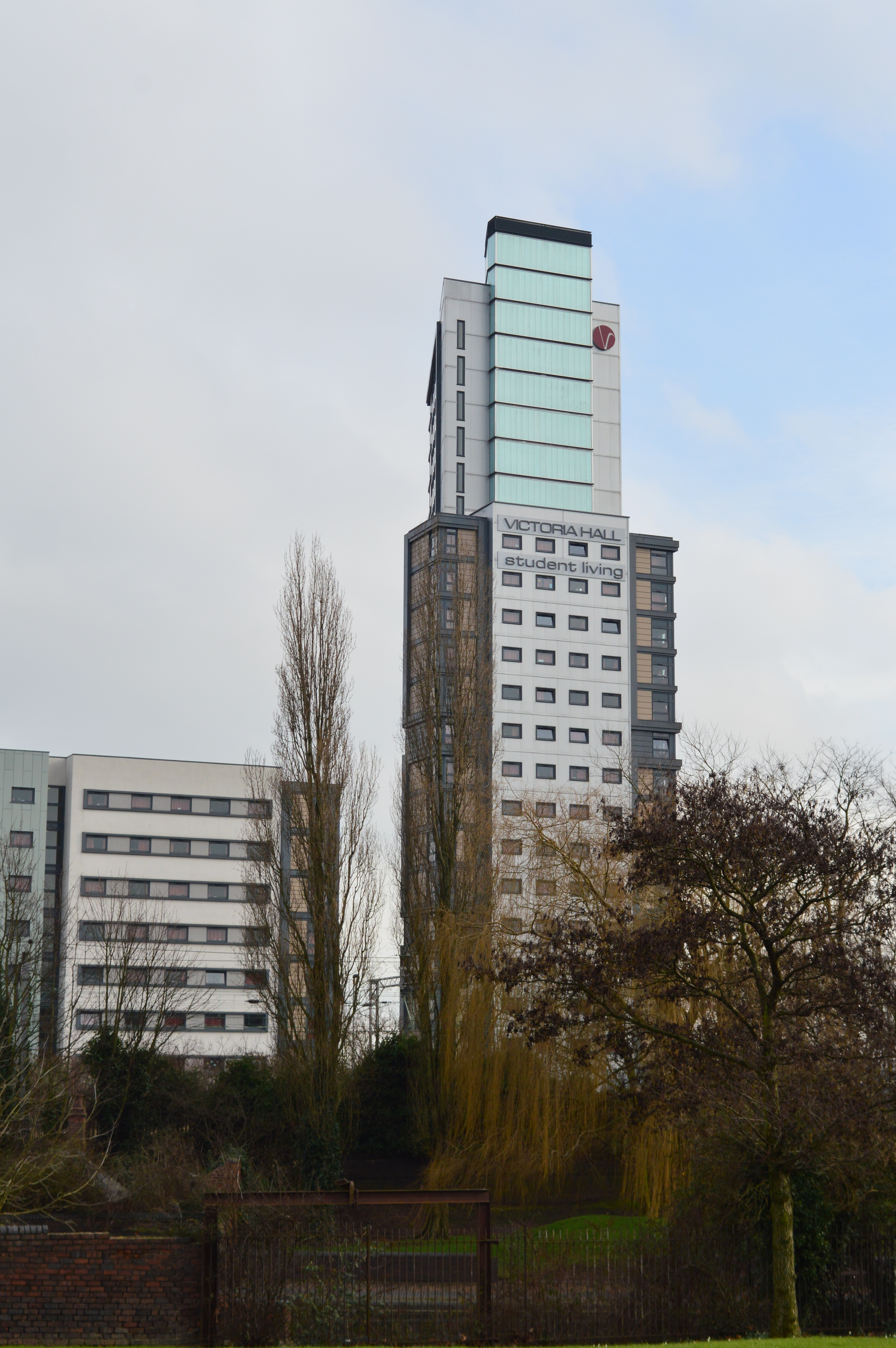
Victoria Halls (Building 1), the tallest building in Wolverhampton at 75 m (246 ft)

Rank	Building	Use	Height	Floors	Built
1	Victoria Halls (Building 1)	Residential	246 ft (75 m)	25	2009
2=	Brockfield House	Residential	203 ft (62 m)	22	1969
2=	Hampton View	Residential	203 ft (62 m)	22	1969
4=	St. Cecilias	Residential	184 ft (56 m)	20	1970
4=	Wodensfield Tower	Residential	184 ft (56 m)	20	1966
4=	William Bentley Court	Residential	184 ft (56 m)	20	1966
4=	Longfield House	Residential	184 ft (56 m)	20	1969
4=	Campion House	Residential	184 ft (56 m)	20	1969
9	St Peter's Collegiate Church	Church	171 ft (52 m)		1480
10	Pennwood Court	Residential	151 ft (46 m)	17	1968

=== Regeneration ===
In recent years, Wolverhampton City Council has embarked on many city improvements and regeneration schemes. One such project was Summer Row, a new £300 million retail quarter for Wolverhampton city centre. The project would have involved clearing existing buildings and a compulsory purchase order was issued in 2006 to over 200 owners/occupiers in the surrounding area. Construction of Summer Row was originally earmarked for 2008, with a completion date listed as 2010, but the 2008 recession put the project on hold. In January 2011, the Summer Row project was formally cancelled as the CPO expired before the council found the necessary financial backing for the project.

==== Mander Centre redevelopment ====
Debenhams, which was listed as the anchor store of Summer Row, announced it was still keen in opening a department store in Wolverhampton. It was revealed that it would open an anchor store in a £35 million redevelopment of the Mander Centre. To be completed in 2017, the 90,000-square-foot (8,400 m^{2}) store would create 120 jobs. The redevelopment would also see the Mander Centre be fully refurbished and reconfigured. A number of larger stores would be created, replacing smaller ones.

==== Wolverhampton Interchange Project ====
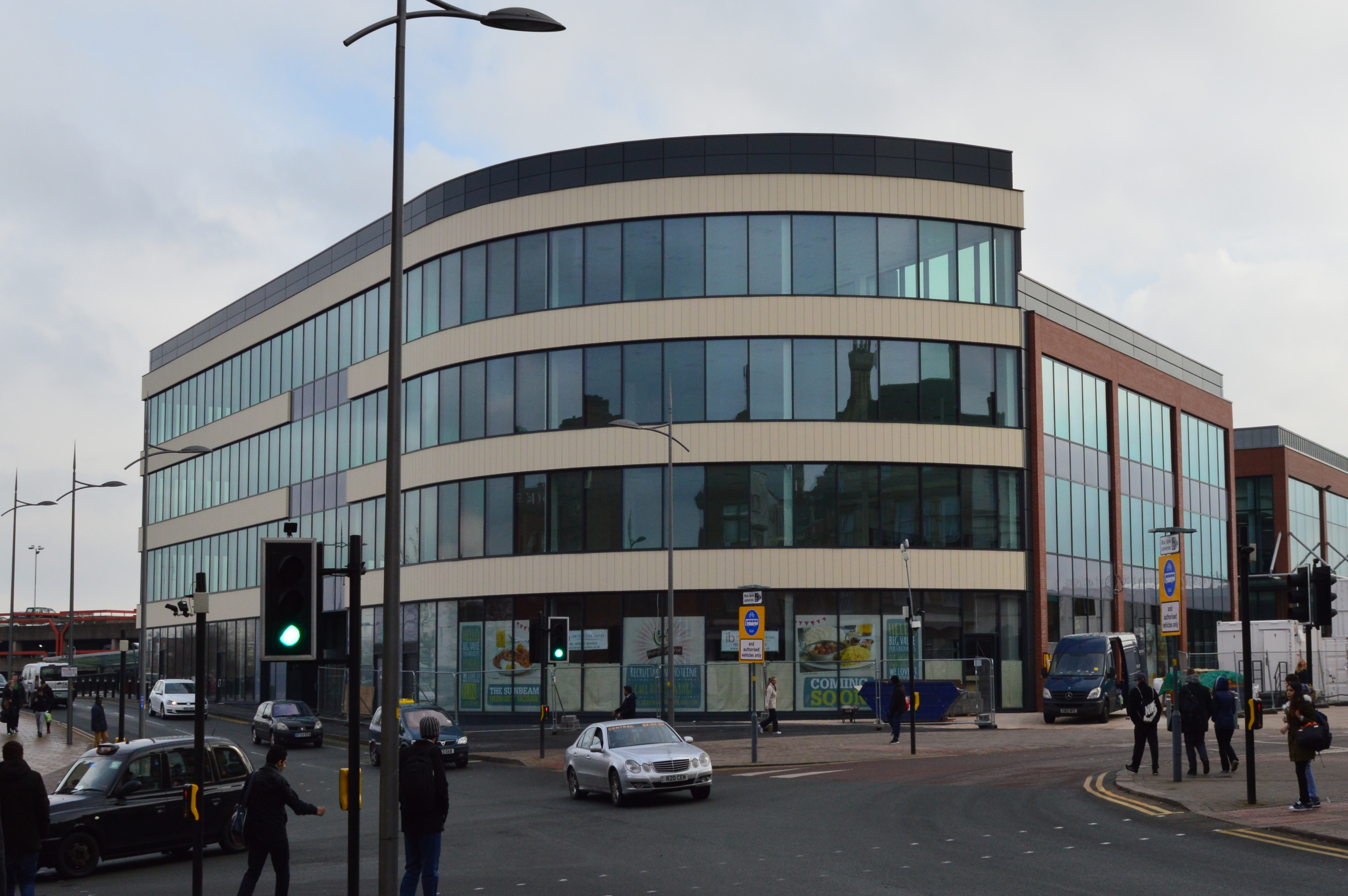
The i10 building contains 12,400 sq ft (1,150 m^{2}) of leisure and retail space on the ground floor and 36,000 sq ft (3,300 m^{2}) of office space above.

Wolverhampton's Interchange Project is a major redevelopment of the city's east side area worth around £120 million.

- Phase 1, which was completed in 2012, consisted of demolishing the old bus station and replacing it with a new £22.5 million station. This phase also included a new footbridge across the ring road towards the railway station, highway and pedestrian works, and new offices for Centro.
- Phase 2 which was completed in late 2015, involved the construction of the £10.6 million i10 building adjacent to the new bus station. The building contains 12,400 square feet (1,150 m^{2}) of leisure and retail space on the ground floor and 36,000 sq ft (3,300 m^{2}) of office space above.
- Phase 3 began in early 2016 on expanding the train station's multi-storey car park. Completed in December 2016, the car park increased in capacity from 450 to over 800 spaces. The expansion of the multi-storey car park included a new cycle and motorcycle parking, short stay parking, passenger drop off point and a taxi rank adjacent to the car park. A new entrance was created.
- Phase 4 involved construction of a new development on the opposite side of Railway Drive to the i10 and is known as i9. The offices are used by the Ministry of Housing, Communities and Local Government, part of central government.

== Education ==
University of Wolverhampton

The University of Wolverhampton is the main provider of higher education in the city. The university currently has more than 23,000 students. In 1835, the Wolverhampton Mechanics' Institute was founded, and its lineage can be traced via the Wolverhampton and Staffordshire Technical College (1935), to The Polytechnic, Wolverhampton (1969) to today's University of Wolverhampton, given university status in 1992. The main university campus is in the city centre, with other campuses at Compton, and in the nearby towns of Walsall and Telford.

Wolverhampton Grammar School was founded in 1512, making it one of the oldest active schools in the UK. Old boys include Mervyn King, Governor of the Bank of England between July 2003 and 2013, and Sir David Wright, former British Ambassador to Japan.

Other notably historic schools include The Royal School, Wolverhampton (founded in 1850), and Tettenhall College (1863), which educated the winner of Nobel Prize for Chemistry, Professor Sir Arthur Harden. City of Wolverhampton College is the main further education college in the city.

Wolverhampton Girls' High School is a well known selective school (state grammar school) which has produced top of league table results within Wolverhampton. Notable old girls include the former English women's cricket captain Rachael Heyhoe-Flint and Baroness Hayman, first Lord Speaker of the House of Lords, as well as Georgia Elwiss, a member of the current 2015 women's cricket team.

St Peter's Collegiate Academy was founded in 1847 in buildings adjacent to St Peter's Collegiate Church in Wolverhampton town centre. It moved to the present extensive green site at Compton Park in 1965. St Peter's is the oldest established educational institution currently in the state sector in Wolverhampton, with a tradition of academic, cultural and sporting excellence nourished by Christian spiritual and moral values. Previous students include record-breaking goalscoring footballer Arthur Rowley.

Wolverhampton, unlike a number of nearby areas such as Dudley and South Staffordshire, has always had three-tier education: 5–7 infants, 7–11 juniors and 11-16/18 secondary schools. Some secondary schools have sixth form facilities for children aged 16+.

== Transport ==
=== Railway ===
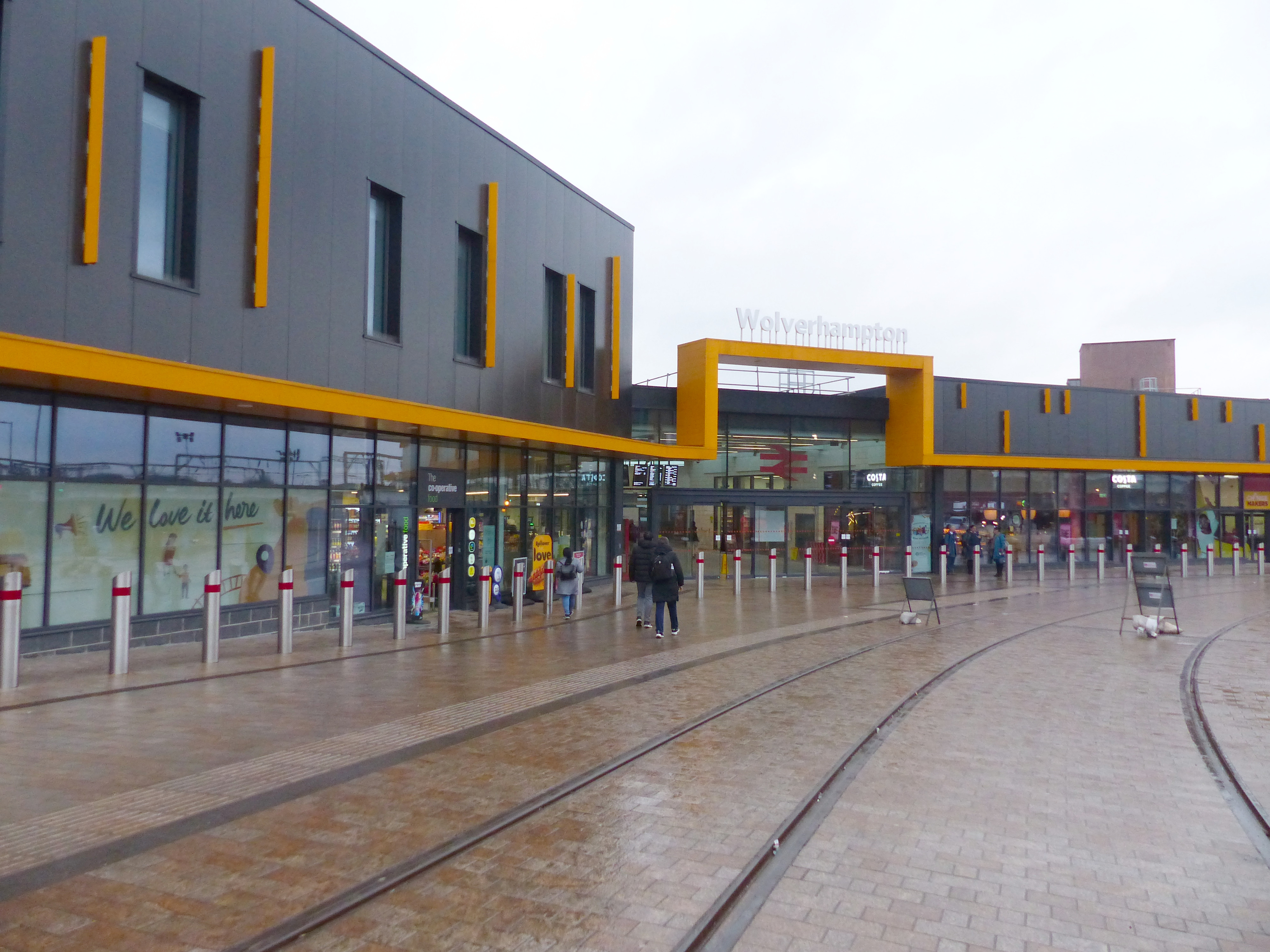
Wolverhampton station (2023)

Wolverhampton is a principal station on the West Coast Main Line; it is served by four train operating companies, which operate the following routes:

Avanti West Coast:

- London Euston - Edinburgh Waverley/Glasgow Central, (Note: Services to/from London alternate between the two Scottish cities.) via Birmingham New Street, Preston and Carlisle

CrossCountry:

- Manchester Piccadilly - Bournemouth, via Stafford, Coventry, Oxford and Reading
- Manchester Piccadilly - Bristol Temple Meads, via Stafford and Worcestershire Parkway.

West Midlands Trains:

- Birmingham New Street - Liverpool Lime Street
- Birmingham New Street - Shrewsbury
- Wolverhampton - Walsall.

Transport for Wales:

- Birmingham International - Llandudno Junction
- Birmingham International - Pwllheli/Aberystwyth; trains split at Machynlleth.

==== History ====
Wolverhampton's first railway opened in 1837, with the opening of the Grand Junction Railway, the first long-distance line in Great Britain. The main station for the city was, however, not located in the city centre but at Wednesfield Heath, in Heath Town on the east side of the city. It was closed in 1965.

The city had two main stations:

- High Level: later renamed Wolverhampton, was built from 1849. It was demolished in 1965, as part of the electrification of the West Coast Main Line and replaced by buildings on the present site. These buildings have also since been replaced with a more modern station building and facilities, opened in 2021.
- Low Level: served the city between 1869 and 1981. It was built by the Great Western Railway, on its route from London Paddington to Birkenhead Woodside, via Birmingham Snow Hill.

Today, all of the suburban railway stations within the city have been closed, although Coseley, Codsall and Bilbrook lie just beyond the boundaries. Some of the seven tram stations in the city are near to or directly replace these stations.

=== Trams ===
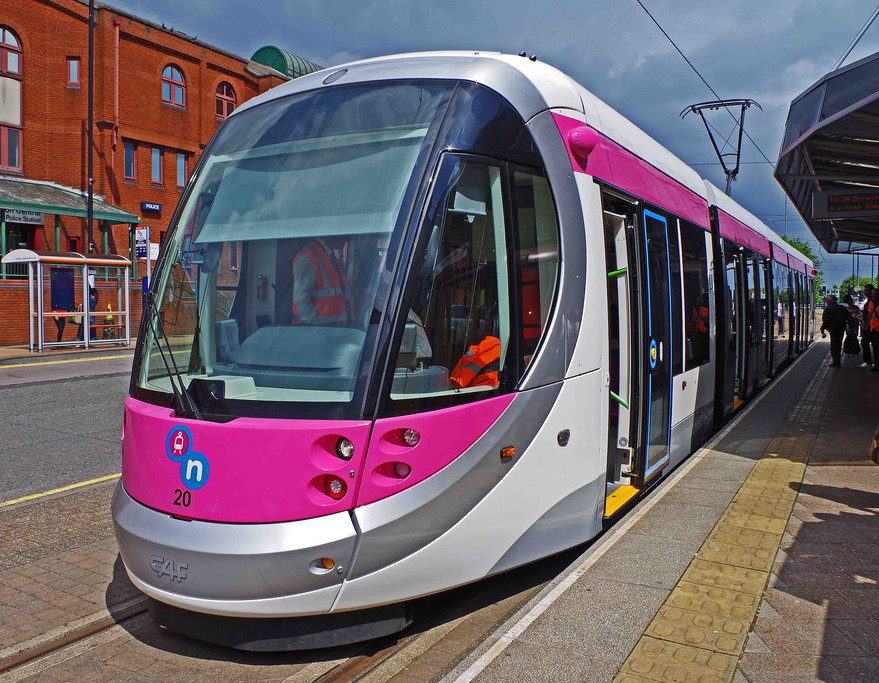
A West Midlands Metro CAF Urbos 3 tram at St. George's

The West Midlands Metro, a light rail tram system, connects Wolverhampton city centre with Birmingham. Line One was opened in 1999, via West Bromwich and Wednesbury, mostly following the former Birmingham Snow Hill-Wolverhampton Low Level Line. The line was extended through to Wolverhampton station in 2023.

Tram services generally operate every 15 minutes from the city to Edgbaston Village; they alternate between commencing at Wolverhampton St George's and the railway station.

=== Buses ===
National Express West Midlands is the largest bus operator in the city; others include Chaserider, Diamond West Midlands, Travel Express, Banga Buses and Arriva Midlands. As well as serving suburbs, buses from the centre of Wolverhampton run to Birmingham, Walsall, Telford, West Bromwich, Stourbridge, Cannock, Stafford, Sedgley, Bilston, Bloxwich, Bridgnorth and Dudley.

Transport for West Midlands operates Wolverhampton bus station on Pipers Row, which was completely rebuilt in 2011. It is situated near to the railway station, providing an interchange between bus, train and tram routes.

=== Roads ===
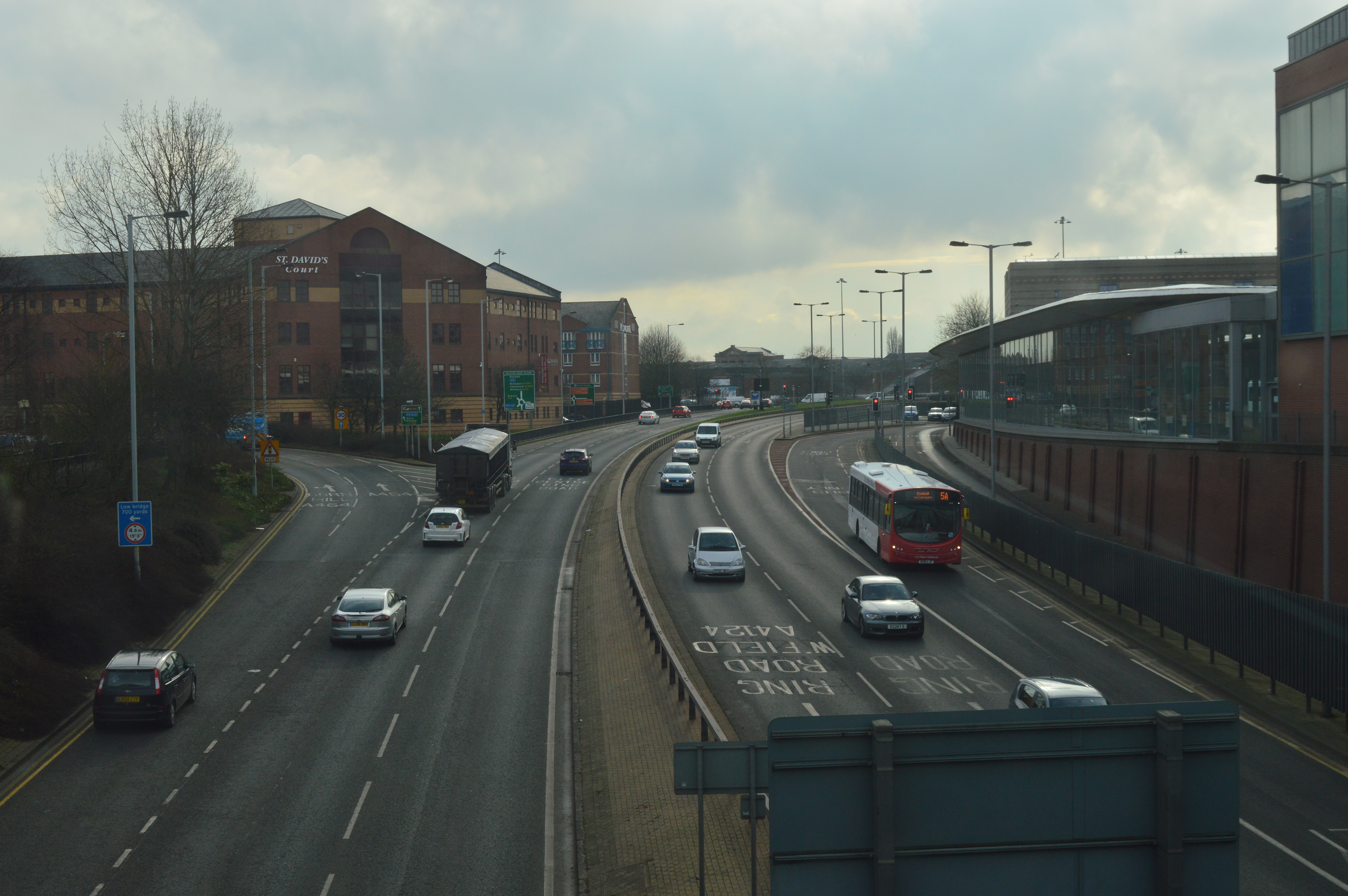
The city's ring road

The city centre forms the main focal point for the road network within the north-western part of the West Midlands conurbation, and out into the rural hinterland of Staffordshire and Shropshire.

In 1960, plans were announced to build a ring road around the centre of Wolverhampton. By the end of the 1960s, more than half of the ring road had been completed, stretching from Snow Hill to Stafford Street (via Penn Road, Chapel Ash and Waterloo Road); this was followed a few years later by a section between Snow Hill and Bilston Street. However, the final section between Bilston Street and Stafford Street (via Wednesfield Road) was not completed until 1986. An outer ring road was also planned but only a small section was ever built; this is Wobaston Road in Pendeford.

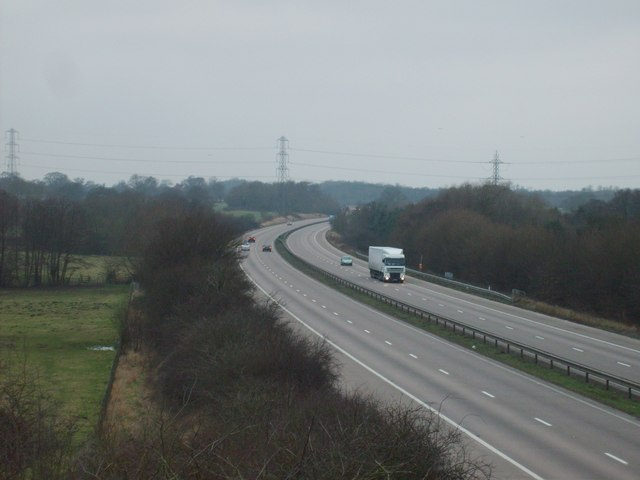
The M54 motorway to the north-west of the city

Wolverhampton is near to several motorways, with four being located within 7 miles (11 km) of the city centre:

- M6 connects the city with Birmingham and Coventry; North West England, including Manchester and Carlisle; Glasgow, via the M74; and London, via the M1. The section nearest to the city is one of the busiest in the UK
- M6 Toll by-passes both the Wolverhampton and Birmingham sections of the M6, to relieve congestion on this stretch
- M5 links the city with South West England and London, via the M40
- M54 forms a northern by-pass to the city, passing just within the fringes of the urban area; it links the area with Telford, Shrewsbury and Wales.

=== Air ===
Wolverhampton's original airport was at Pendeford, operating between 1938 and 1970. The current Wolverhampton Halfpenny Green Airport is a small general aviation airfield, located 8 miles (12.9 km) south-west of the city. It hosts several fly in events and is an original World War II airfield.

The nearest major airport is Birmingham Airport, approximately 25 miles (40.2 km) away. It is easy to reach by train, with a direct express service to Birmingham International station taking just over half an hour.

=== Waterways ===
There are no navigable rivers within the city, but there are 17 mi (27 km) of navigable canals. The Birmingham Canal Main Line passes through the city centre, connecting with the remaining portion of the Wednesbury Oak Loop at Deepfields Junction, and the Wyrley & Essington Canal at Horseley Fields Junction. It passes between the railway and bus stations, and then descending 132 feet (40 m) through the 21 locks and terminating at Aldersley Junction. Here, it meets the Staffordshire and Worcestershire Canal, which in turn connects with the Shropshire Union Canal at Autherley Junction.

=== Cycling ===
Most places in the borough and some of the neighbouring villages in South Staffordshire are within easy reach of the city centre by bicycle; the terrain is moderately hilly. Cycling benefits from the 20 mph (32 km/h) city centre within the ring road; a number of routes use quieter roads and paths to avoid the ten A roads that radiate outwards.

Wolverhampton lies on the Smethwick to Telford section of Sustrans National Cycle Network Route 81. This follows the Birmingham Main Line Canal towpath from Smethwick to Broad Street Basin, where the route splits in two: riding the 21 locks section to Aldersley Junction or taking the Cross-City route braid to visit the city centre, West Park or Smestow Valley Leisure Ride before returning to Aldersley Junction. NCN81 continues to Autherley Junction along the towpath of the Staffordshire and Worcestershire Canal, along the east bank towpath of the Shropshire Union Canal as far as Pendeford Mill Lane, before turning to Bilbrook. The lanes of nearby South Staffordshire and east Shropshire provide ideal cycle touring conditions.

== Culture ==
=== Music ===
The rock groups Slade, Cloven Hoof, Sahotas, The Mighty Lemon Drops and Babylon Zoo came from Wolverhampton, as did electronic musician Bibio, soul/R&B singer Beverley Knight, drum and bass guru Goldie, and roots reggae maestro Macka B. Kevin Rowland of Dexys Midnight Runners was born in Wednesfield, Wolverhampton.

Hip hop music producer S-X, who has worked with T.I., J. Cole, Birdman and Lil Wayne, was born and raised and still lives in Wolverhampton. In 2010, Wolverhampton-born singer Liam Payne (1993–2024) came third in the British television music show The X Factor with his boy band One Direction, who in March 2012 became the first British group to go straight to the top of the US music charts with their debut album, Up All Night.

Wolverhampton has a number of live music venues; the largest occasionally used is the football ground, Molineux Stadium, which was used for a Bon Jovi concert in 2003, but the biggest indoor venue regularly used is Wolverhampton Civic Hall, with a standing capacity of 3,000. Second to that is Wulfrun Hall (part of the same complex as the Civic Hall, which is owned and operated by the City Council) which has a standing capacity of just over 1,100. The Civic Halls complex also has a newer venue, The Slade Rooms (named after the 1970s rock band), which has a capacity of approximately 550 standing. There are also a number of smaller venues with capacities of between 100 and 250, although the longest-established of these, the Wolverhampton Varsity, is now closed, as is the Little Civic. Other venues include the Light Bar in Fryer Street, the 'Numa Bar' and the Dog & Doublet (next to the old Little Civic), although the situation in this area of entertainment remains fluid. The 18th-century St John's Church is a venue for smaller scale classical concerts. The city is also home to Regent Records, a choral and organ music recording company, and Wolf Town DIY, an independent record label that primarily releases punk and alternative music by underground artists. The Midland Box Office in Queen Square is the primary sales point for most of Wolverhampton's venues.

The city's main choral groups include the City of Wolverhampton Choir, (a choral society founded as the Wolverhampton Civic Choir in 1947) and the Choir of St. Peter's Collegiate Church.

=== Arts and museums ===
The Grand Theatre on Lichfield Street is Wolverhampton's largest theatre, opening on 10 December 1894. It was designed by C. J. Phipps and completed within six months. Included amongst the people to have appeared at the theatre are Henry Irving, Charlie Chaplin and Sean Connery. It was also used by politicians including Winston Churchill and David Lloyd George. The theatre was closed between 1980 and 1982.

The Arena Theatre on Wulfruna Street, within the University of Wolverhampton is the secondary theatre, seating 150. It hosts both professional and amateur performances.

Cinemas include a multiplex Cineworld located at Bentley Bridge, Wednesfield, and the four-screen Lockworks Cinema, housed in the former Chubb Buildings on Fryer Street.

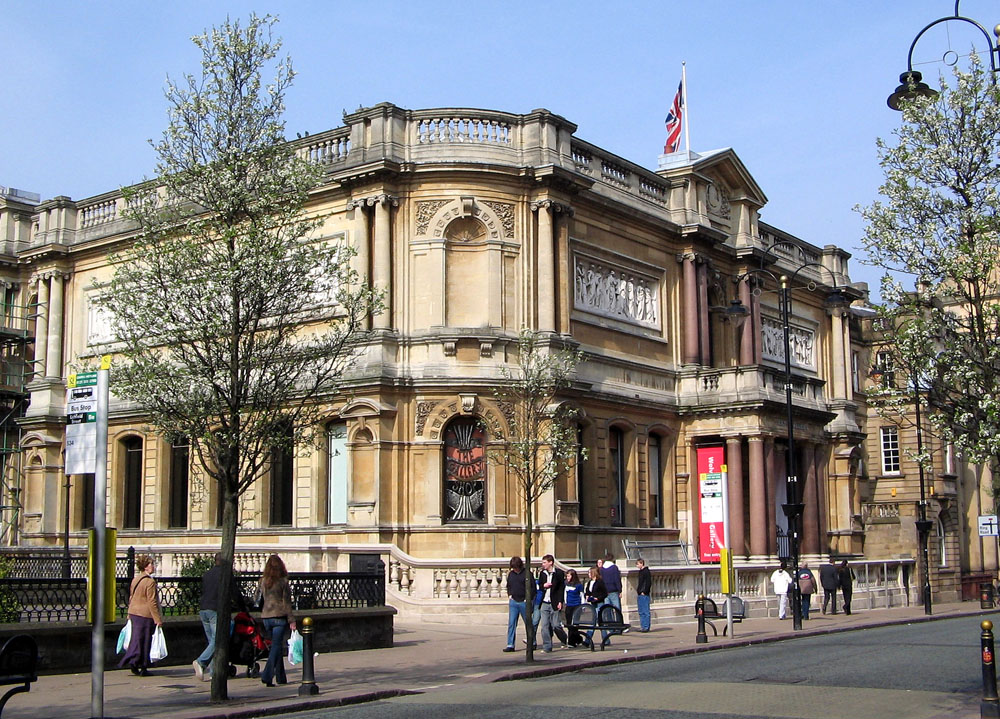
Wolverhampton Art Gallery

The city's Arts & Museums service, run by the council, covers three sites: Wolverhampton Art Gallery, home to England's biggest Pop art collection after that held at the Tate; Bantock House, a fine historic house with Edwardian interior with a museum of Wolverhampton located within Bantock Park; Bilston Craft Gallery with exhibitions of contemporary crafts.

The Black Country Living Museum, situated in nearby Dudley, has a large collection of artefacts and buildings from across the Black Country, including an extensive collection associated with the city.

Eagle Works Studios and Gallery, situated in Chapel Ash, is a self run artists' group. It provides studio accommodation for eighteen visual artists, mostly painters. Its small gallery holds a regular programme of exhibitions to show and promote contemporary art in the city.

The National Trust owns two properties on the edge of the city that are open to the public: Wightwick Manor, which is a Victorian manor house and one of only a few surviving examples of a house built and furnished under the influence of the Arts and Crafts movement and Moseley Old Hall, which is famous as one of the resting places of Charles II of England during his escape to France following defeat at the Battle of Worcester in 1651. English Heritage owns Boscobel House, within Shropshire, another refuge of Charles II.

Nearby museums also include the Royal Air Force Museum, at RAF Cosford and the RAF Fire Service Museum at Wolverhampton Airport, whilst Chillington Hall, which boasts of grounds designed by Capability Brown, and Himley Hall are nearby houses open to the public.

=== Libraries ===
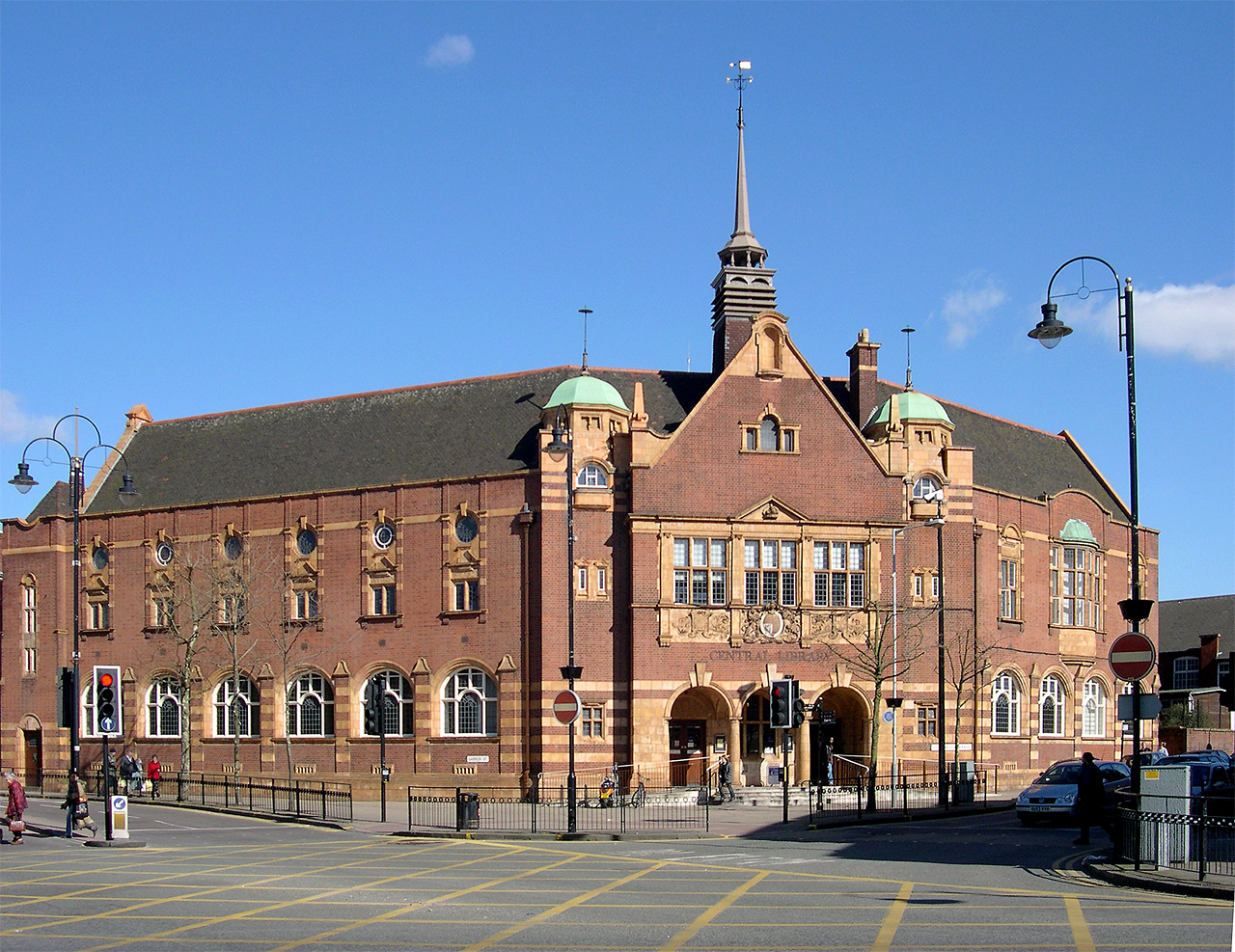
Wolverhampton Central Library

Located on the corner of Garrick Street and St George's Parade, Wolverhampton Central Library is a Grade II listed building, designed by architect Henry T. Hare and opened in 1902. It was originally commissioned to commemorate Queen Victoria's Diamond Jubilee using funds raised by the Mayor, Alderman S Craddock, and by a grant of £1,000 from Andrew Carnegie. This new library improved public access to information and reading material, replacing its cramped predecessor in the old Garrick Street Police Station.

The terracotta exterior has a tripartite theme of related, but distinct façades. The entrance façade is the architect's centrepiece and is decorated with a frieze under the triple window which carries the Royal Coat of Arms and the Wolverhampton Coat of Arms. The other two façades celebrate English literary giants; Chaucer, Dryden, Pope, Shelley, Byron and Spenser on one side and Milton and Shakespeare on the other. An extension for a newsroom and a students' room was added in 1936 followed by a small brick and concrete extension at the rear in the 1970s.

Wolverhampton City Council also operate 14 branch libraries within the city.

== Media ==
Wolverhampton is home to the Express & Star newspaper, which boasts of having the largest circulation of any provincial daily evening newspaper in the UK.Parent company Midland News Association is based in Wolverhampton.

Local television news programmes are BBC Midlands Today and ITV News Central.

BBC local radio station that covers the city is BBC Radio WM on 95.6 FM.

The city was originally home to four radio stations. 107.7 The Wolf was absorbed into regional station Signal 107, now broadcasting as Greatest Hits Radio Black Country & Shropshire from studios in Liverpool, Manchester, London and Birmingham. Beacon Radio was absorbed by Orion Media and then Bauer Media, now broadcasting as Hits Radio Black Country & Shropshire from studios in Birmingham and Manchester. Radio WABC was the AM service from Beacon Radio which has since closed, following a number of rebrands as Classic Gold Digital, Gold and Free Radio 80s. The fourth, and now the only radio station based in the city, is community radio station WCR FM, which broadcasts solely to the Wolverhampton on 101.8FM, online, via the Tune In app and via smart speaker.

In December 2005, the BBC commissioned the poet Ian McMillan to write a poem about Wolverhampton, along with four other towns which apparently "had a reputation they didn't deserve". "Made in Wolverhampton" (2013), an essay documentary feature film by Adam Kossoff, maps out the hidden history and architecture of Wolverhampton from the point of view of a discontented fictional arts lecturer who teaches at the Wolverhampton School of Art.

== Sport ==
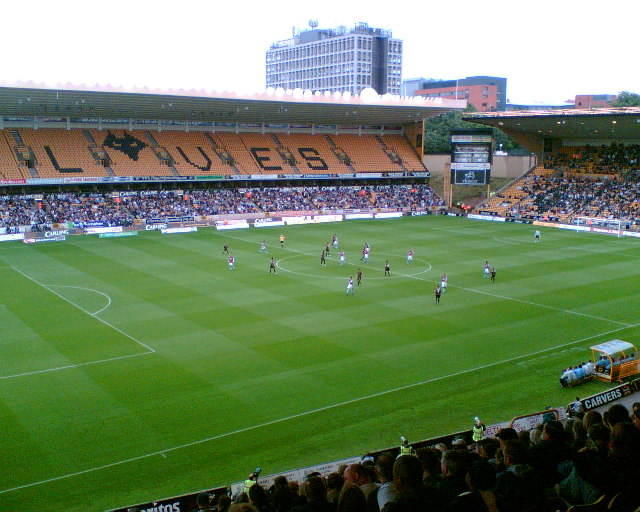
Molineux Stadium, home of Wolverhampton Wanderers

=== Football ===
Wolverhampton was represented in the Premier League, the highest tier of English football, by Wolverhampton Wanderers FC until their relegation in the 2025–26 Premier League season. 'Wolves', as they are known, are one of the oldest English football clubs, and were one of the 12 founder members of the Football League. Their most successful period was the 1950s, where they won three Football League Championships (then the highest division) and two FA Cups, and were involved in the earliest European friendlies. They were hailed by the press as 'The Unofficial World Champions' after one of their most famous victories, against Budapest Honvéd FC of Hungary. They were also the first English team to play in the Soviet Union. These victories instigated the birth of the European Cup competition which later evolved into the UEFA Champions' League (see European Cup and Champions League history).

In total, they have won three Football League titles (prior to the top division becoming the Premier League), four FA Cups, have two League Cup victories and many other minor honours, including reaching the UEFA Cup Final in 1972, and appearances in the last eight of both the UEFA European Cup, and the European Cup Winners' Cup, but spent just one season in the top division between 1984 and 2009. They are also one of only two clubs, along with Portsmouth, to have won five different league titles; they have championed all four tiers of the professional English league, as well as the long-defunct northern section of the Third Division.

Wolves have a long-established rivalry with West Bromwich Albion. Separated by 12 mi (19 km), the two clubs have faced each other over 160 times since 1886. Aston Villa and Birmingham City FC are also close rivals of Wolves, having played them 121 and 136 times respectively. Geographically, Walsall FC are closest to Wolves, but rarely compete at the same level. Since 1886, the two clubs have only played 16 times against each other.

Several other Wolverhampton-based clubs play non-league football, notably AFC Wulfrunians and Wolverhampton Sporting Community F.C. in the Midland Football League Premier Division, Wolverhampton Casuals FC, Wednesfield FC, and Bilston Town FC in the West Midlands (Regional) League, and Warstones Wanderers F.C. in the West Midlands (Regional) League – Division Two.

=== Athletics ===
Wolverhampton's Aldersley Leisure Village is home to Wolverhampton & Bilston Athletics Club, which was formed in 1967 with a merger between Wolverhampton Harriers and Bilston Town Athletic Club. They have won the National League Division One for men from 1975 to 1982, and the Men's National Cup finals in 1976, 1977, 1979 and 1980. It also represented Britain in the European Clubs Cup from 1976 to 1983 with the best finishing position of third.

Olympic medallists in athletics Sonia Lannaman and Tessa Sanderson lived within the city.

=== Cricket ===
There are several cricket clubs in the city, including Wolverhampton, Springhill, Springvale, Fordhouses and Wombourne.

=== Field hockey ===
The city has a few field hockey hockey clubs that compete in the Midlands Hockey League. These are Wolverhampton & Tettenhall Hockey Club and Finchfield Hockey Club.

=== Cycling ===
Wolverhampton Wheelers is the city's oldest cycling club, formed in 1891. It was home to Hugh Porter who won four world championship pursuit titles; and Percy Stallard who has been credited with bringing cycle road racing to Britain when he held the Llangollen to Wolverhampton race on 7 June 1942. Wolverhampton Wheelers make extensive use of the velodrome at Aldersley Stadium. Wolverhampton was also the home of Trevor Gadd, who was a six time British National Cycle champion and twice silver medallist at the 1978 Commonwealth Games, as well as a fifth-place finisher in the 1977 UCI Track Cycling World Championships in Venezuela.

Wolverhampton has also hosted the Tour of Britain, with a stage start in 2006, a stage finish in 2007 and a sprint finish in 2008. It is also home to Wednesfield Aces cycle speedway, which is based at Ashmore Park.

=== Horse and greyhound racing ===
Wolverhampton Racecourse is located at Dunstall Park, just to the north of the city centre. This was one of the first all-weather horse racing courses in the UK and is Britain's only floodlit horse race track. There is greyhound racing at Monmore Green. West Park, a large park near the city centre, was converted from a racecourse.

A horse by the name of Wolverhampton was among the leading contenders for the 1849 Grand National at Aintree, but did not complete the course.

=== Motor sports ===
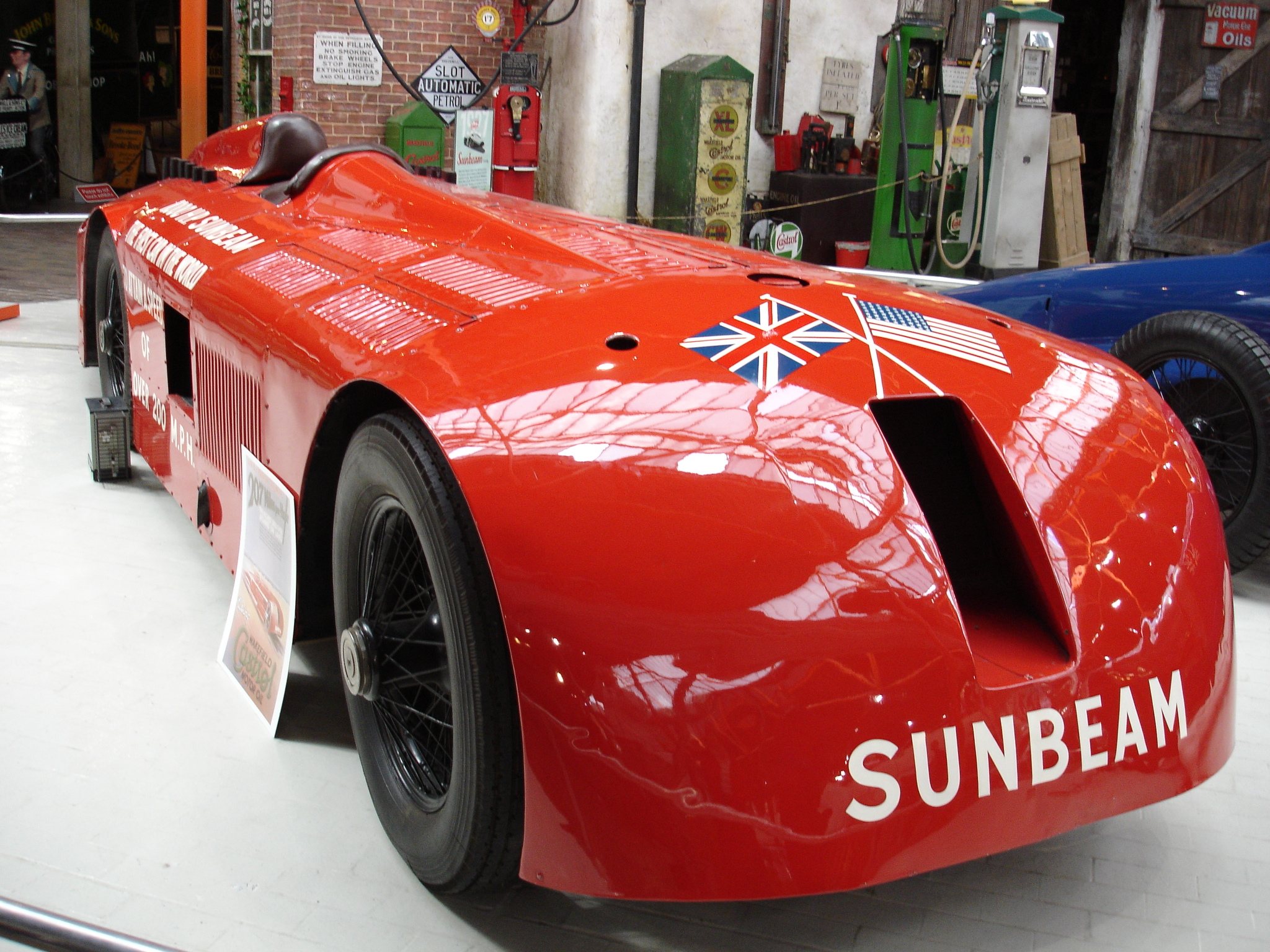
Sunbeam 1000HP at National Motor Museum in Beaulieu, UK

Sunbeam built many early Grand Prix cars and was the only British make to win a Grand Prix in the first half of the 20th century. Sunbeam also built several holders of the Land speed record, including the first vehicle to travel at over 200 miles per hour (322 km/h), the Sunbeam 1000 hp.

AJS was heavily involved in motorcycle racing either side of World War II, which included winning the 1949 World Championship in the 500cc category.

Kieft Cars built Formula Three cars in the early 1950s; its best known driver was Stirling Moss.

Wolverhampton Wolves, one of the leading speedway clubs in the UK represents the city, participating in the Elite League at the Monmore Green stadium. Wolverhampton Speedway is one of the oldest speedway tracks in the world that is still in operation being first used, albeit briefly in 1928. The track re-opened in 1950 for a single meeting and, in 1952, the Wasps competed in the Third Division on the National League. The track closed early in 1954 and did not re-open until 1961 when the Wolves were introduced to the Provincial League. The track has almost been an ever-present ever since and currently operates in the British Elite League. Ole Olsen (in 1971 and 1975), Sam Ermolenko (in 1993) and Tai Woffinden (in 2013) were riders for the club when they became World Speedway Champions. The Wolves are defending Elite League champions, having defeated the Belle Vue Aces in the 2016 play-off final.

Le Mans 24 Hours winner Richard Attwood is from the city.

=== Marathon ===
Wolverhampton is home to the Carver Wolverhampton City Marathon. The marathon is part of a series of events whose main goal is to raise money for charity.

=== Obstacle course race ===
The Tough Guy Race is held annually near Wolverhampton. It is considered the first civilian obstacle course race.

=== Commonwealth Games ===
The city hosted the cycling time trials for the 2022 Commonwealth Games on 4 August 2022. The start and finish was at West Park, with the route passing through the City Centre before heading out into city suburbs.

== Places of interest ==
Key
	Abbey/Priory/Cathedral
Accessible open space	Accessible open space
	Amusement/Theme Park
	Castle
Country Park	Country Park
	English Heritage
	Forestry Commission
Heritage railway	Heritage railway
Historic house	Historic House
Places of Worship	Places of Worship
Museum (free) Museum	Museum (free/not free)
National Trust	National Trust
	Theatre
	Zoo

- Bantock House Museum and Park
- Bilston Craft Gallery
- Mander Centre
- Molineux Stadium (Wolverhampton Wanderers F.C.)
- Moseley Old Hall
- St Peter's Collegiate Church
- West Park
- Wightwick Manor
- Wolverhampton City Archives
- Wolverhampton Art Gallery
- Wolverhampton Civic Hall
- Wolverhampton Grand Theatre
- Wolverhampton Racecourse
- Wolves in Wolves.

== Notable people ==
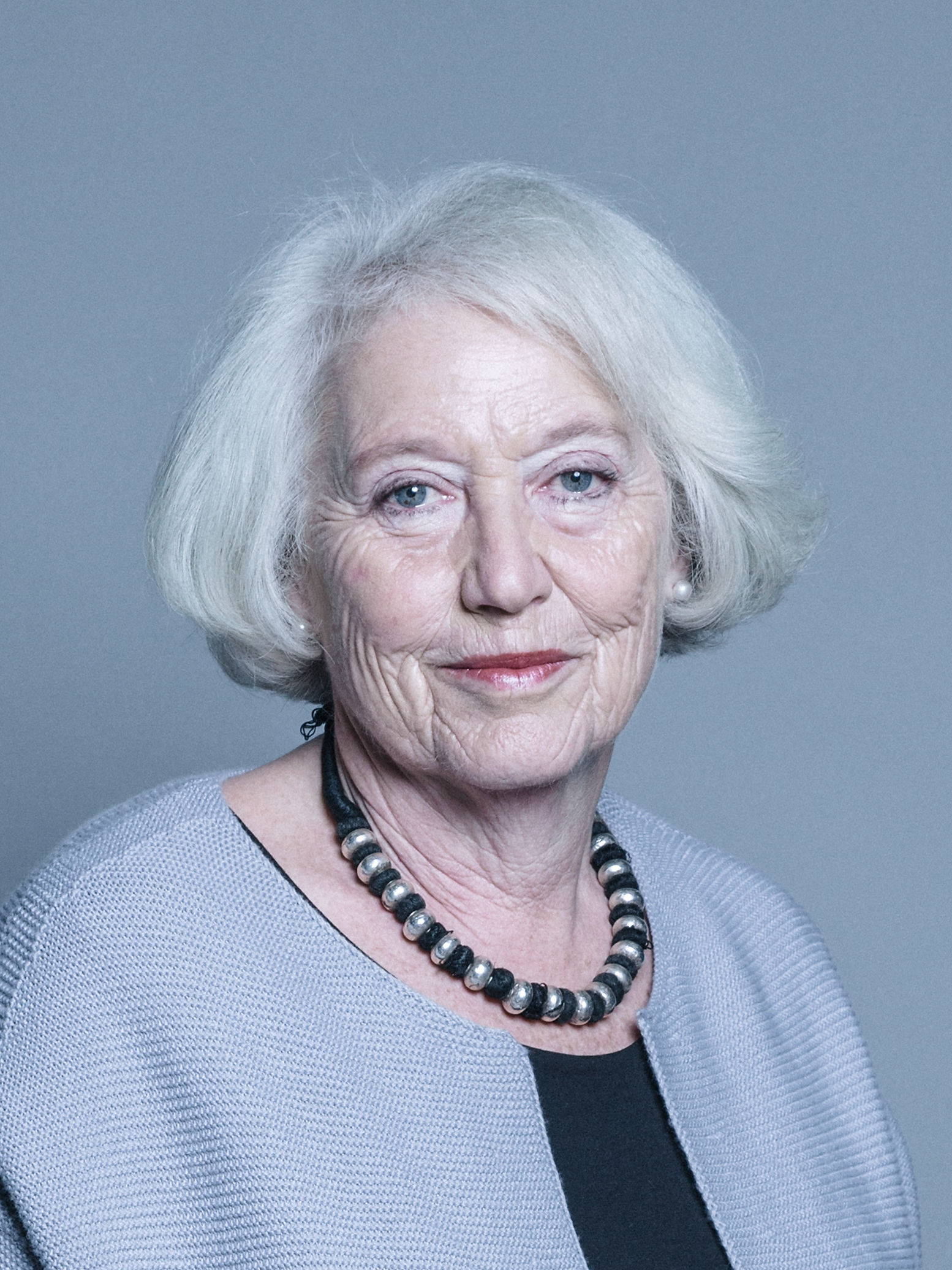
Baroness Hayman, 2018

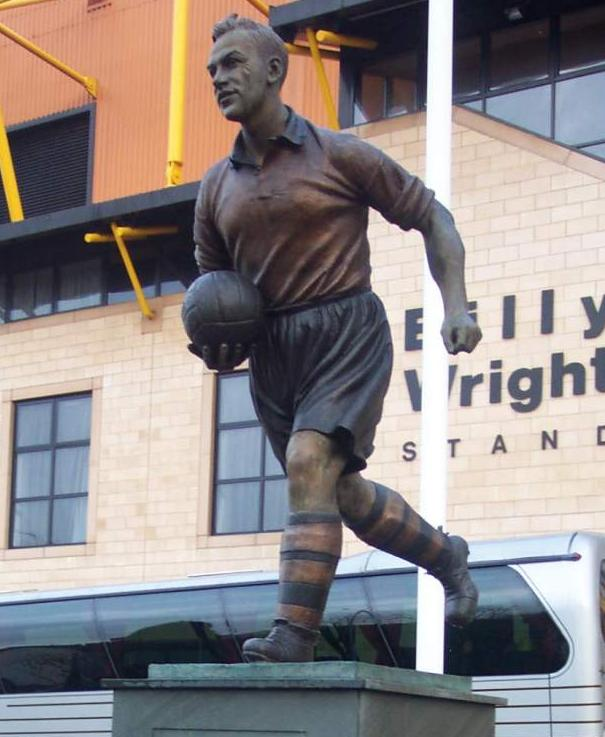
Statue of Billy Wright outside Molineux Stadium

Political figures associated with Wolverhampton include Enoch Powell MP; Sir Charles Pelham Villiers MP, who holds the record for the longest serving MP, Helene Hayman, Baroness Hayman, who was the first Lord Speaker within the House of Lords; former Cabinet minister Stephen Byers; former prime minister Boris Johnson, who briefly worked as a writer for the Express & Star; Henry Fowler, 1st Viscount Wolverhampton, a solicitor and Liberal politician; David Wright, a former UK ambassador to Japan; and Button Gwinnett, a signatory of the US Declaration of Independence and briefly served as governor of Georgia.

Sportspeople associated with the city include footballers Billy Wright, Steve Bull, Bert Williams and Jimmy Mullen; along with Percy Stallard and Hugh Porter from the world of cycling; the Olympic medallist swimmer Anita Lonsbrough; golfer Aaron Rai; professional darts player Wayne Jones; racing driver and winner of the 24 hours of Le Mans Richard Attwood; as well as athletes Tessa Sanderson and Denise Lewis. Cricketer Vikram Solanki grew up here and played for Wolverhampton Cricket Club before joining Worcestershire. 2023 Wimbledon Boys' Singles Champion Henry Searle is from Wolverhampton, as is 2026 PGA Champion Aaron Rai. Five times European 400m champion Matthew Hudson-Smith was born in the city.

Entertainers include actors Nigel Bennett, Goldie, Frances Barber, Meera Syal and Eric Idle; and musicians Noddy Holder, Dave Hill, Beverley Knight, Dave Holland, Maggie Teyte, Edward Elgar, Robert Plant, Bibio, Paul Raven, trap-metal rapper Scarlxrd and Liam Payne of the group One Direction; and television presenters Suzi Perry, Mark Rhodes and Mark Speight. The socially conservative future president of the National Viewers' and Listeners' Association, Mary Whitehouse, lived in Wolverhampton between 1939 and the early 1960s before relocating to Shropshire.

Within the area of commerce and industry, Sir Alfred Hickman (first Chairman of Tarmac), Sir Geoffrey Mander, John Marston founder of Sunbeam Cycles and Sunbeam Motor Car Company, John 'Iron Mad' Wilkinson (pioneer of cast iron) and Mervyn King, the former governor of the Bank of England, are amongst the most notable. Prof Ernest Geoffrey Cullwick, a specialist in electromagnetism and its effects on atomic particles, was born and raised in Wolverhampton. Thief-Taker General, Jonathan Wild (ca.1682–1725) came from the town.

=== List of Freemen of the City of Wolverhampton ===
The following people have been granted the title 'Freeman of Wolverhampton':

- Henry Hartley Fowler, MP, 11 February 1892
- Charles Pelham Villiers MP, 11 May 1897
- Sir Charles Tertius Mander, 24 May 1897
- Sir Joseph Cockfield Dimsdale, MP, 29 July 1902
- Sir Alfred Hickman, MP, 29 July 1902
- William Highfield Jones, 29 July 1902
- Sir George Hayter Chubb, 14 October 1909
- John Marston, 14 October 1909
- Joseph Jones, 14 August 1912
- David Lloyd George MP, 23 November 1918
- Field Marshal Earl Haig of Bemersyde, 16 October 1919
- Albert Baldwin Bantock, 9 November 1926
- Levi Johnson, 9 November 1926
- Thomas William Dickinson, 18 July 1938
- Thomas Austin Henn, 7 October 1943
- Alan Davies, 29 October 1945
- Sir Charles Arthur Mander, 29 October 1945
- Joseph Harold Sheldon (1920–1964), 24 March 1958; paediatrician (Note: See Freeman–Sheldon syndrome.)
- Sir Charles Wheeler, 24 March 1958
- Denise Lewis, 13 December 2000
- Sir Jack Hayward, 9 July 2003
- Dennis Turner, Baron Bilston, 20 December 2006
- Hugh Porter, 17 December 2008
- Baroness Heyhoe Flint, 3 November 2010
- Beverley Knight, 16 May 2018
- Steve Bull, 11 September 2018.

In addition, on 19 August 2006, freedom was granted to veterans of the Princess Irene Brigade who were members of the Dutch Army stationed at Wrottesley Park during World War II.

== See also ==
- 1835 Wolverhampton riot
- Wolverhampton power station
