= Odeon Cinema, Wolverhampton =

Former cinema in Wolverhampton, England

Odeon Cinema
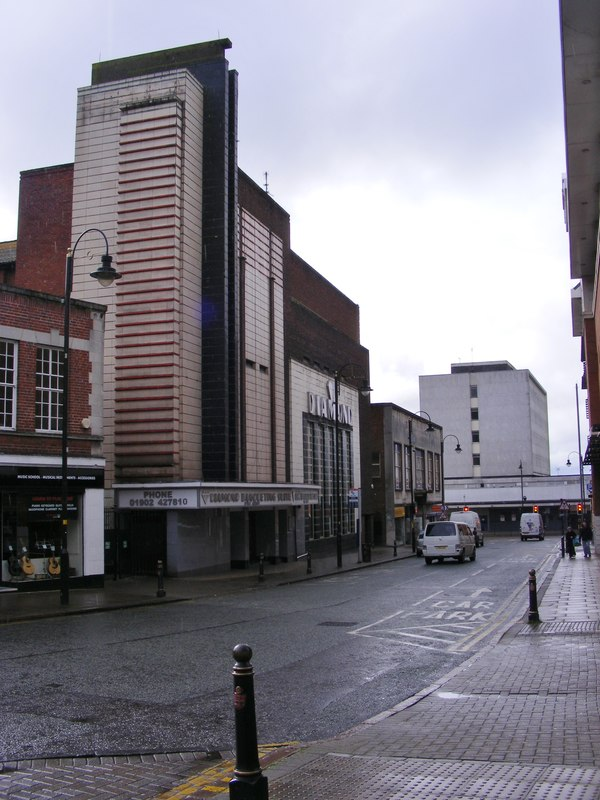

General information
- Architectural style: Moderne
- Location: Wolverhampton, West Midlands
- Address: Skinner Street; Wolverhampton WV1 4LD
- Country: England
- Coordinates: 52°35′2.418″N 2°7′51.499″W grid reference SO 91223 98474
- Opened: 1937

Design and construction
- Architect(s): Harry Weedon and Partners

The Odeon Cinema is a former cinema, later a bingo club, banqueting suite and events venue, in Wolverhampton, West Midlands, England. it is a Grade II listed building.

== History ==
The cinema was built by Harry Weedon and Partners for the Odeon Cinemas company of Oscar Deutsch. There were 1,272 seats in the stalls and 668 in the circle. The opening on 11 September 1937 was attended by Oscar Deutsch and the Mayor of Wolverhampton Sir Charles Mander, and the first film shown was Dark Journey.

It was converted in 1973 to have three screens, with two small cinemas under the balcony. After closing in 1983 it became a Top Rank Bingo Club, with conversion back to a single auditorium, and later Mecca Bingo. It was given listed status by English Heritage, Grade II, in 2000.

The bingo club closed in 2007; in 2009, after refurbishment, the building opened as the Diamond Banqueting Suite, which closed in March 2020 at the time of the COVID-19 pandemic. In 2023, after refurbishment, it opened as an events venue The Astoria.

== Description ==
It is built in Moderne style; the brick building has cream faience cladding on the tower and above the entrance, and black faience on the fin projecting from the façade. The interior also retains original features. The listing text comments: "The façade is a particularly successful essay in streamlined modernism, with no drastic subsequent alterations. The tower and fin feature advertises the cinema, creating a landmark."
