= Old Fallings =

Suburb of Wolverhampton, England

Coordinates: 52.612°N 2.107°W

Old Fallings is a suburb of Wolverhampton, West Midlands, England. It is north-east of Wolverhampton city centre, within the Fallings Park ward. It mostly consists of interwar council housing.

Old Fallings contains some roads, including Old Fallings Lane, Croft Lane, The Riddings and Leason Lane. Some parts of Cannock Road are part of Old Fallings.

A school resides in Old Fallings Lane named Our Lady and St Chad (OLSC).
