= Chapel Ash =

Area of Wolverhampton, England

Coordinates: 52.5851°N 2.1380°W

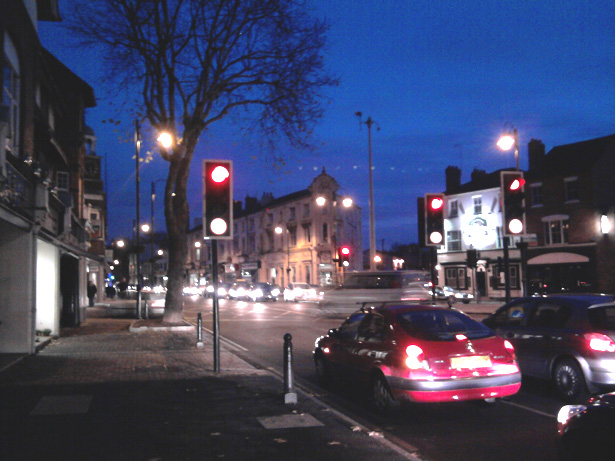
- Chapel Ash at night
- Region: West Midlands
- Country: England
- Sovereign state: United Kingdom
- Post town: Wolverhampton
- Postcode district: WV
- Dialling code: 01902
- Ambulance: West Midlands

Chapel Ash is a small area in Wolverhampton surrounded by the City Centre, Whitmore Reans and Merridale.

The area is most noted for being the home of Marston's, where the Park Brewery produces the well-known Banks's range of ales

== History ==
Owing to its prominent position on the London to Holyhead road, Chapel Ash has always been an important thoroughfare, though it didn't reach its current stage of urbanisation until the 1870s. The name, 'Chapel Ash' is believed to refer to a Chapel & burial ground referred to in the 16th century, to the west of the town centre – William Yates' '1775 Map of the County of Stafford' has the name written next to the junction of the roads from Bridgnorth and Shrewsbury, the possible site of the medieval chapel. In 1823, Darlington Street had been constructed, linking Wolverhampton's 'High Green' (now Queen Square) to the westward route out of the town – still rural at this time. Some twenty six years later, St Mark's Church was constructed. By 1871, the majority of the buildings we see today in Chapel Ash were in place. From 1875 onwards, Park Brewery was up and running. The area was quite prosperous until the coming of the Ring Road, which cut Chapel Ash off from the town centre during the 1970s.

== Today ==
Chapel Ash is dominated by an arterial route out of the city, which splits into three; the first is the continuation of the A41 road from London to Holyhead (via Telford and Shrewsbury), the second is the A454 to Bridgnorth in Shropshire, and the third is a smaller route to the adjacent area of Merridale, Penn and Bradmore. Housing is predominately Victorian era dwellings, with a mix of early villas, later terraces and some local council social housing and private homes built between the 1920 – 1950 period.

Chapel Ash has a variety of different businesses based in the area. Banks's Park Brewery still dominates the Chapel Ash area. Wolverhampton's former Eye Infirmary is based at the junction of Compton Road and Merridale Road.

Chapel Ash has been regularly criticised for the poor condition of many of the commercial properties, with features in the local press highlighting several aspects of the area, though the area has benefitted from recent refurbishment of some properties, construction of the new £2.25 million Lifespring church on Clifton Street, and development of a new £65 million Sainsburys store on Raglan Street.

=== Junction Festival ===
An annual arts and music festival has been held in the area each August since 2011, featuring street art, an outdoor stage and live music in local pubs.
