= 1835 Wolverhampton riot =

1835 riot in Wolverhampton, England

The 1835 Wolverhampton riot was an outbreak of violence upon the occasion of a hotly contested by-election for the South Staffordshire county constituency of the House of Commons of the United Kingdom during Wednesday and Thursday, 26–27 May 1835. The magistrates, asserting that a dangerous mob had formed, which was assaulting electors and damaging property, called in the dragoons. The soldiers, under the command of one Captain Manning, fired on the mob who had retreated to the cemetery and wounded four of them, including three boys. One of the wounded, who had received a shot in the knee, had his leg amputated.

The riot received great attention in the time and was the subject of a discussion in the House of Commons and of a special inquiry, which cleared the soldiers and magistrates of blame. It is not clear to this day whether their actions were indeed warranted by the situation on the ground. At any rate, the riot illustrates the high level of social tension in the English towns of that period. In fact, it was compared at the time to analogous earlier riots in Bristol and Manchester.

== Background ==
The South Staffordshire by-election was held after the passage Reform Act 1832. One candidate was the Whig politician Colonel George Anson, an experienced MP and the brother of the Earl of Lichfield who had a large following in the area. The other candidate was Sir Francis Goodricke (1797–1865), a Tory.

While the non-electors of the town were predominantly of Radical persuasion, the electors were more evenly divided between Whig and Tory supporters. The tense campaign quickly grew violent on the first day of polling, with the mob allegedly assaulting those electors who voted or intended to vote for the Tory candidate. In some cases, electors claimed that they were prevented from voting and bodily assaulted. In other cases, they were beaten after casting their votes. This sort of carrying on was not uncommon in English elections of this time, but the actual extent of the disturbances was later hotly disputed in the House of Commons.

== Arrival of the troops ==
After the polling was completed for the first day, a mass of Anson's supporters surrounded Goodricke's campaign headquarters in the Swan Inn and threw some stones at the windows. The town magistrates, who considered the situation to be quickly getting out of hand, in part owing to the lack of sufficient police (there were a small number of untrained special constables on hand, who could or would dare do little in the face of the mob), called in a troop of the 1st Dragoons that had been stationed nearby, per an earlier request by the magistrates.

Once the soldiers had arrived, the Riot Act was read by one of the magistrates and the soldiers almost immediately fired at the mob which had by now moved to the cemetery. Four people were shot. Later, the soldiers charged the crowd, dealing out blows with the flat sides of their swords.

== Controversy ==
A number of widely divergent accounts of the events were given and it seems impossible to fully reconcile them. The critics also alleged that instead of the customary one hour, only five minutes were given to the crowd to disperse after the reading of the Riot Act.

=== Death of a soldier's horse ===
All sides agree that the proximate cause for the soldier's charge on firing and the crowd was the death of one of the soldiers' horses. However, the accounts substantially differ on what actually happened to the horse. According to one version, the horse was killed by a stone thrown by the mob – showing that the soldiers were provoked. According to another account, the soldiers first charged the crowd and the horse fell during the charge. A third version, offered in Parliament, was that the horse was stabbed by a short knife, once again partially vindicating the soldiers' conduct. However, it is possible that the horse was accidentally stabbed by a sword drawn by one of the soldiers.

=== Role of the soldiers ===
Another source of contention was the subsequent dispersal of the soldiers into small group of twos and threes. According to one position this was an irregular measure, as the soldiers were no longer under the control of the officers and could engage in wanton acts of cruelty. Others had alleged that this dispersal was necessary to patrol the town and to re-establish public order.

== Aftermath ==
Sir Francis Goodricke actually won the election and sat for two years in Parliament (not standing for re-election in 1837). During that time he never rose to speak.

== Sources ==
- Gash, Norman. Politics in the Age of Peel. pp. 149–53. ISBN 0-393-00564-X.
- Cox, David J. (2011). "The Wolves Let Loose at Wolverhampton - A Study of the South Staffordshire Election 'Riots,' May 1835" (PDF). Law, Crime and History. 1 (2). Archived from the original (PDF) on 7 January 2013.
- UK Parliament (1 June 1835). "Disturbance at Wolverhampton". Commons and Lords Hansard, the Official Report of debates in Parliament.
