= M54 motorway =

Motorway in England

M54
- M54 highlighted in blue
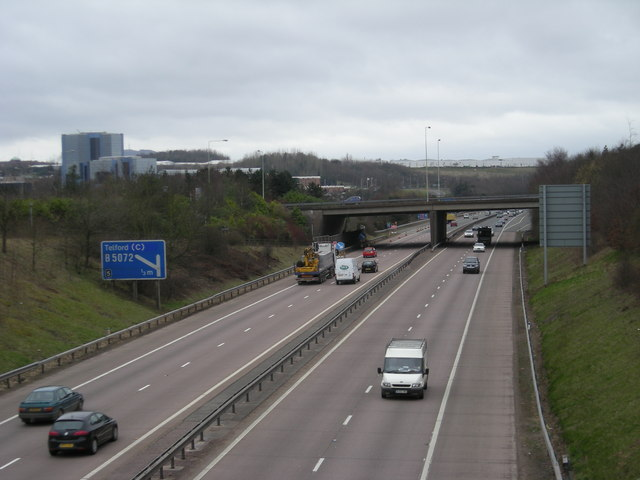
- At junction 5 in Telford, the first completed stretch of the motorway, 2008

Route information
- Maintained by National Highways
- Length: 23.0 mi (37.0 km)
- Existed: 1975–present
- History: Constructed 1975–1983

Major junctions
- East end: Essington
- J10a → M6 motorway J5 -> A5
- West end: Wrockwardine

Location
- Country: United Kingdom
- Counties: Staffordshire, Shropshire
- Primary destinations: Wolverhampton, Telford

Road network
- Roads in the United Kingdom; Motorways; A and B road zones
← M53	→ M55

The M54 is a 23-mile-long (37 km) east-west motorway in the counties of Shropshire and Staffordshire, England. It is also referred to as the Telford motorway, after the road's primary westbound destination, the town of Telford. It cost £65 million to construct, and is two-lane dual carriageway for the majority of its length, with sections of three-lane.

The M54 spur connects the M6 motorway near Essington, Staffordshire with the A5 trunk road at Wellington, Shropshire. The motorway forms part of the strategic route to North Wales, roughly following the path of the Roman Watling Street and the A5 north-westwards, towards the port of Holyhead. It is the only motorway in Shropshire, and forms a vital part of the county's road network. In 2007, the motorway handled an annual average daily traffic of between 50,300 (J2–3) and 41,800 (J4–5) vehicles.

== History ==
=== Planning ===
The idea of the M54 was originally presented due to the high volumes of traffic on the A5, London to Holyhead road which was largely constructed by civil engineer Thomas Telford in the early 19th century following the route of the Roman Watling Street, which connected Rochester, Kent with Wroxeter, Shropshire. The initial plan for a motorway following the M54's present route was therefore designed to alleviate the roads which handled the commercial traffic to the port of Holyhead, destined for Ireland. With the proposal in the early 1960s for a new town to provide an overspill housing area for the West Midlands conurbation, then named Dawley New Town (designated as Telford in 1967), the M54 was becoming more likely to be built; the government also wanted to increase transport provision to the rest of Shropshire.

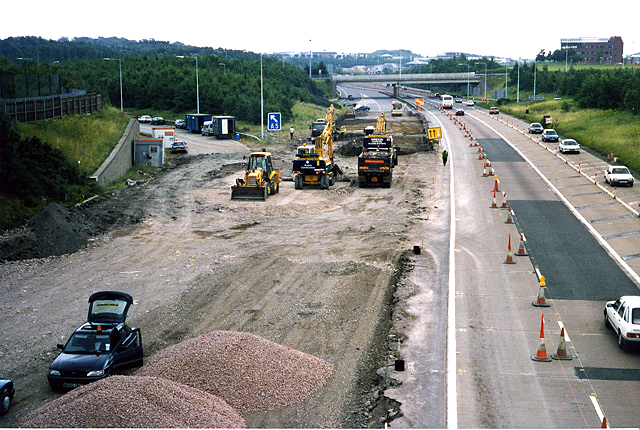
The M54 undergoing critical reconstruction work, J5 (Telford Centre), 1997.

In 1967 the Ministry of Transport invited construction company Freeman Fox, Wilbur Smith Associates to investigate and report on the impact of the New Town proposals on traffic demand between the proposed New Town site and Wolverhampton, and the best highway solution to meet this demand. The predicted demand was that of 75,000 vehicles per day by 1990 and a need for a dual 3-lane motorway. Two corridors were identified for a possible new motorway route, and a third option to possibly upgrade existing roads. The route could have followed the A5 Corridor to the M6 South of Gailey, at junction 12, or a new corridor could have been established to the M6, north-east of Featherstone, at junction 11. Additionally, it was proposed that the existing A5 could be upgraded to full dual carriageway grade separated standards together with improvements to the A41 and A464 trunk routes.

=== The Wellington bypass ===
The first section of the M54 was opened in 1975, then named the A5 Wellington bypass (bypassing one of the existing towns which formed part of Telford), but renumbered the M54 in 1983 when the motorway was extended. The bypass removed traffic from the heavily congested route through the urbanised areas of Oakengates and Wellington, and removed one of the country's most notorious bottlenecks at the Bucks Head crossroads, in Wellington; delays of up to six hours could be experienced in the summer months.

=== Construction ===
The Wellington bypass was constructed by contractor M. J. Gleeson, from 1973 to 1975. Many problems followed in the two years after completion; the rigid concrete carriageway broke up, due to the road being built on a poor subbase with rigid concrete along a historically heavily mined route. The aesthetic and constructional design of the bridges was also heavily criticised. Over the next 15 years, almost all of the original carriageway had to be replaced with asphalt.

The 30-kilometre (19 mi) section between the junction with the M6, and Telford, excluding the Wellington bypass, was divided into four contracts each awarded to different companies; all sections remained under the design of Sir Owen Williams and Partners.

- Contract 1 (Shifnal) was given to A Monk & Co., who utilised a slip-form paver to construct the concrete section, which led to it becoming a standard in future motorway construction.
- Contract 2 (Donington) was awarded to R M Douglas Construction The two-year contract was completed in only 18 months, due to the dry weather which allowed the earthworks to be completed ahead of schedule.
- Contract 3 (Codsall) was taken by Alfred McAlpine & Son (Southern), and was constructed almost identically to contract 1.
- Contract 4 (Essington) was the largest contract, and was awarded to Tarmac Construction (later Carillion). This section took the longest to complete, and faced opposition from Staffordshire County Council who wanted disruption at the junction with the M6 to remain minimal.

The Forge junction at Telford Town Centre was awarded relatively late, to the company Norwest Holst. The junction precipitated the construction of Telford Shopping Centre, and the central commercial area, as the exchange was upgraded to allow traffic from the motorway to join and exit in both directions.

The Forge to Cluddley section, from junction 5 to junction 7, opened to traffic in December 1975.

The Hilton Park to Forge section, from the M6 to junction 5, opened in November 1983.

The motorway cost £65 million to build, which when adjusted for inflation would come to approximately £310 million in 2025.

To help alleviate opposition to the intrusive motorway design, the 60 feet (18 m) wide carriageway was built to pass below the natural landscape, where possible. Man-made hills were constructed which, along with the planting of 250,000 new trees, helped to camouflage the motorway from view, and cut down on the noise level. This aesthetic improvement project took two and a half years to complete and employed over 100 people.

== Impact ==
The recent strong economic growth and lower unemployment in the Telford area has been attributed to the construction of the motorway: unemployment in the mid-1980s peaked at over 20%, but by 2004 this figure had fallen to 3.3%. The motorway enabled the development of distribution centres in Telford, and industrial estates such as Hortonwood and Stafford Park have provided employment in the area.

Some of the highest pollution levels in the borough of Telford and Wrekin are along the M54, particularly in the urban area between junctions 5 and 7.

The M54 is particularly busy in mid-August: it carries traffic to the Shrewsbury Flower Show from the east and it also carried traffic to the V Festival at Weston-under-Lizard from the south (via the M6) until 2017.

== Route ==
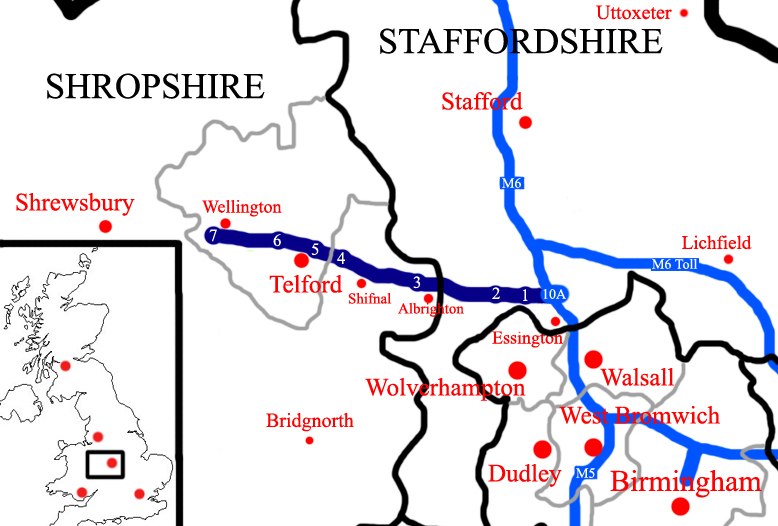
A map showing the M54 (dark blue) in relation to other motorways (light blue), shown within the ceremonial counties of Shropshire, Staffordshire and West Midlands. Area highlighted within UK on the left.

The road runs west from junction 10A of the M6 motorway near Essington, Staffordshire (Map). It passes south of Featherstone near junction 1 and then north of Bushbury before reaching junction 2. Just before junction 3 with Albrighton the road enters Shropshire. It then passes to the north of Shifnal. Between junction 4 and junction 5, the road passes across the Wolverhampton to Shrewsbury railway line, and through the centre of Telford. Between junctions 6 and 7, the road runs around the south of Wellington before joining the A5 (Map), which continues on to Shrewsbury as dual carriageway.

Telford Motorway Service Station opened on 18 March 2003 at junction 4, and is operated by Welcome Break. It is the only service station on this motorway and, if travelling east, the last before Corley on the M6 or Frankley on the M5.

Junction 2 was modified to accommodate the new A4510 link road to the new i54 Business Park, built to the West of the junction.

== Proposed developments ==
=== Extension of the M54 to Shrewsbury ===
In 2013, the Department for Transport (DfT) investigated the possibility of extending the M54 westward to Shrewsbury, thereby placing the county town on the UK motorway map for the first time. Traffic has to continue onto the dual carriageway A5 when the M54 ends at Wellington although the road surface or speed limits do not change at all, only the road classification.

=== M54 to M6 / M6 (Toll) Link Road ===
The M54 currently meets the M6 at junction 10A where there is no access to the northbound M6 or to the M6 Toll. Northbound access to the M6 is via the A449 from junction 2 and the most direct route to the M6 Toll is via the congested A460 from junction 1.

Plans for a link road between the M54 and the M6 Toll (M6 junction 11a) were supported in principle by the Secretary of State for Transport in 2003 and were put on display in 2006 with an expected construction date of 2012. The £102 million cost for the scheme would be paid for by The Macquarie Infrastructure Group (the company that owns Midland Expressway Ltd and operates the M6 Toll). Unfortunately, the project was suspended. It was revived again in July 2025, however, and is now expected to start construction in December 2026, with an expected completion date of 2035.

=== Other proposals ===
In February 2009, local newspaper the Shropshire Star reported plans to create a flyover linking the M54 and A442 in Telford town centre, just south east of Telford Central railway station. Presently traffic has to travel along a single carriageway portion of the A5, and pass through two roundabouts to access the M54. Since Junction 5 of the motorway is only 200 metres (220 yd) from the current bridge across the A442, the plans would involve either having two motorway junctions immediately next to each other, or one complex flyover.

Proposals for a 'Western Bypasses of Wolverhampton and Stourbridge' were rejected by the government in 2003.

== Incidents ==
In April 2021, a lengthy fire at a plastics recycling plant resulted in days of closures to provide access for firefighters.

== Junctions ==
M54 motorway junctions
Ceremonial county	Location	mi	km	Junction	Destinations	Notes
Staffordshire	Wolverhampton	0	0	J10A of M6 (Note: 52.6304°N 2.0490°W)	M6 – Birmingham	No exit to M6 northbound No entrance from M6 Southbound
Staffordshire	Wolverhampton	2.0	3.2	1 (Note: 52.6398°N 2.0871°W)	A460 – Wolverhampton, Cannock	Traffic for M6 North has to leave the M54 here.
Staffordshire	Wolverhampton	3.6	5.8	2 (Note: 52.6381°N 2.1258°W)	A449 – Wolverhampton, Stafford A4510 - i54	
Shropshire	—	11.1	17.9	3 (Note: 52.6585°N 2.2995°W)	A41 – Wolverhampton, Whitchurch	
Shropshire	Telford	16.0	25.7	4 (Note: 52.6794°N 2.4067°W)	A464 – Telford, Shifnal A4640 – Donnington; Telford Services	
Shropshire	Telford	17.7	28.5	5 (Note: 52.6831°N 2.4477°W)	A5 – Cannock B5072 – Lawley	
Shropshire	Telford	19.5	31.4	6 (Note: 52.6884°N 2.4887°W)	A5223 – Lawley, Newdale, Wellington	
Shropshire	Telford	21.8	35.0	7 (Note: 52.6907°N 2.5430°W)	A5 – Shrewsbury B5061 – Wellington	
1.000 mi = 1.609 km; 1.000 km = 0.621 mi: Incomplete access

*Ceremonial Counties

Coordinate list

== See also ==
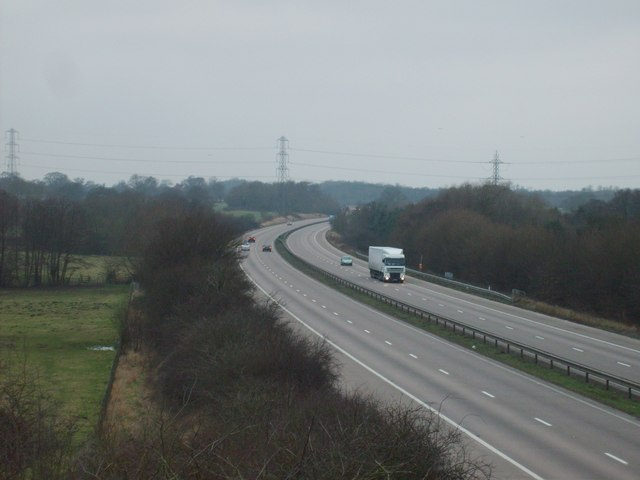
The view from Staffordshire Way, which passes over the M54 near Codsall.

- List of motorways in the United Kingdom
- i54 – new manufacturing centre adjacent to the M54 (which it is named after)
