= Claregate =

Suburb of Wolverhampton, England

Coordinates: 52.6080°N 2.1602°W

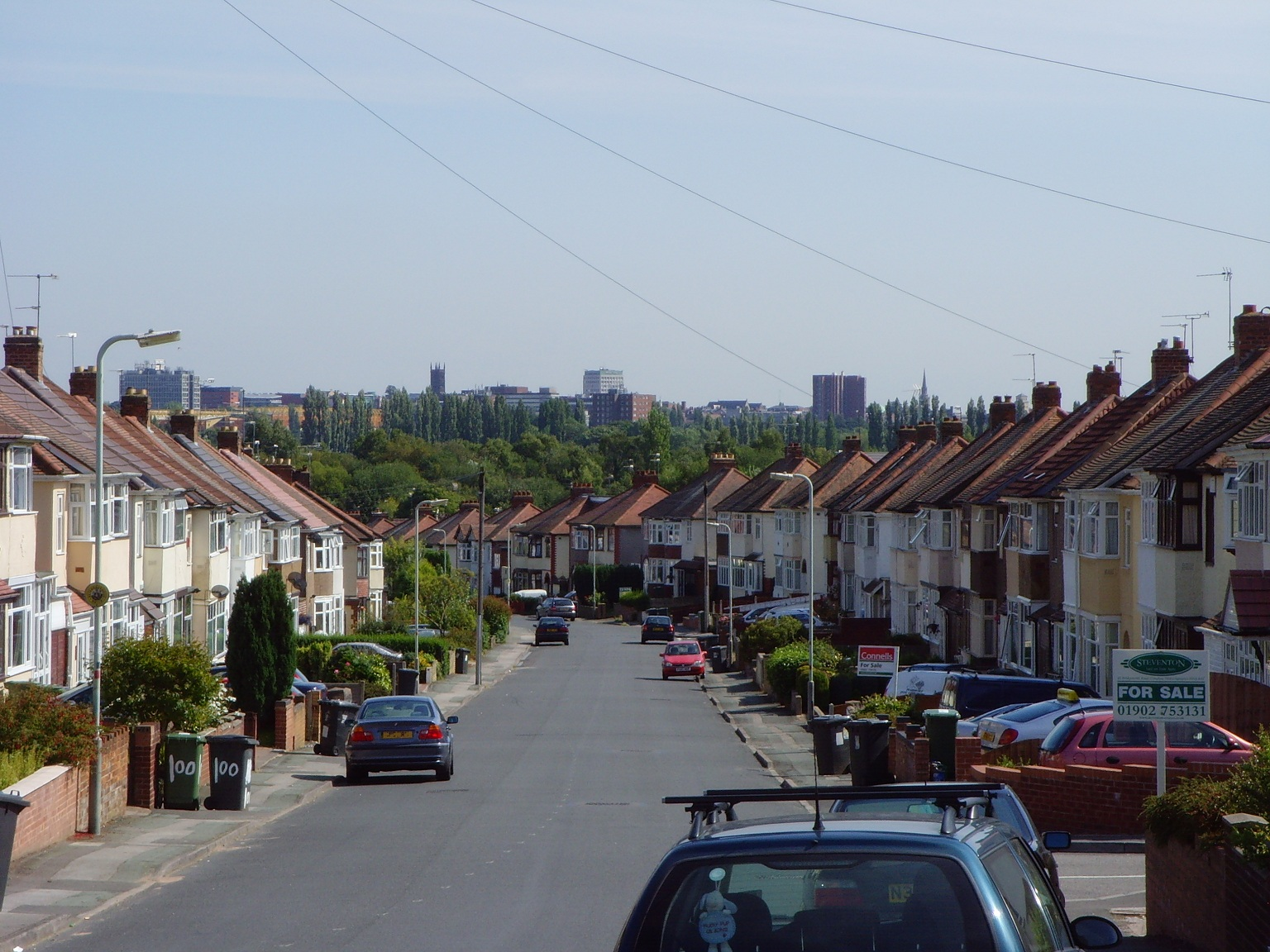
Burland Avenue, Claregate

Claregate is a suburb of Wolverhampton, West Midlands, England. It is north west of Wolverhampton city centre, within the Tettenhall Regis ward.

== History ==
As a distinct residential area, Claregate has only existed since the pre and post war housing estate was built between the Codsall and Aldersley roads. It is bounded on the north east side by the rail line from Wolverhampton to Shrewsbury, on the south east side by the Staffordshire and Worcestershire Canal and on the west side by the ridge that rises up to Tettenhall village. The origins of the name are unknown, though a 13th-century source names a place called 'Clare' in the area.

== Today ==
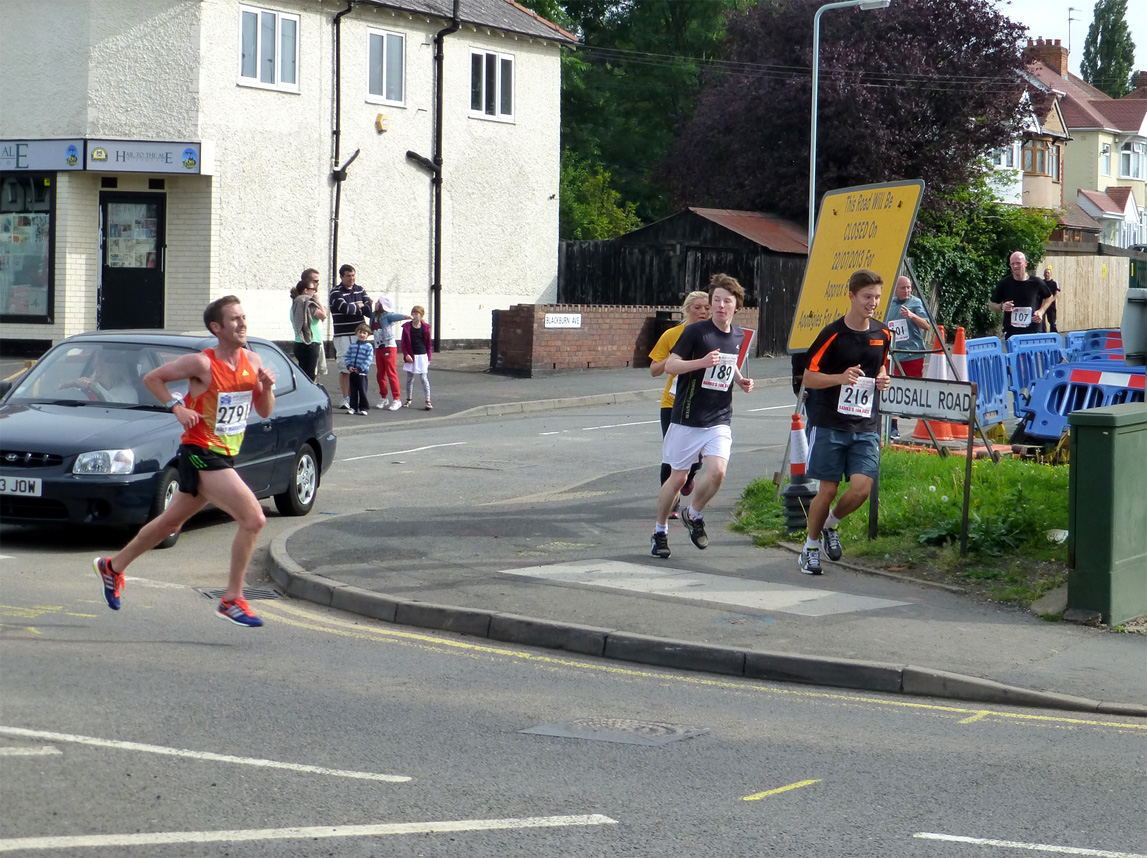
Wolverhampton Marathon 2013 at Codsall Road, Claregate

Claregate is situated between Tettenhall, Pendeford and Aldersley. The area is majority housing, with shopping areas, pubs and a school. The route of the Wolverhampton Marathon used to pass through.

=== Amenities ===
The focal point of the area is the traffic island between Codsall Road, Pendeford Avenue, Blackburn Avenue and Knights Avenue. Here, a cluster of businesses are located including a filling station originally named Claregate Garage, hairdressers, boutique, sandwich shop and barbers.

There are also shopping parades at the junction of Green Lane and Blakeley Avenue with a Premier convenience store, Chinese take-away and a children's nursery amongst other businesses. A hardware shop, a Co-operative Food store, an off-licence and two fish and chip take-aways are situated on Pendeford Avenue at its junction with Green Lane.

=== Education ===
Claregate has one school, Claregate Primary School, situated on Chester Avenue.

=== Claregate Playing Fields ===
Claregate has a large playing field that is used for cricket and football, as well as hosting tennis courts and a children's playground. In June 2013, the park was saved for future generations when it was unveiled as one of six Wolverhampton parks to be designated a Queen Elizabeth II Field.

Adjacent to the playing fields is Claregate Pavilion, which provides changing room facilities to clubs using the playing fields. The pavilion was home to Sugar n Spice, an activity group for girls aged over nine years. Sugar n Spice was active for over 50 years before closing in 2023.

=== Public houses ===
Claregate has two long established pubs: 'The Claregate' (formerly 'The Fieldhouse') on Codsall Road and 'The Pilot' on Green Lane. In 2012, Marston's Brewery announced plans to construct a mini Tesco supermarket on land that currently forms part of The Claregate's car park. The scheme faced opposition from a local campaign group called Residents Against Marston's Proposals (RAMP), but was approved in November 2012 on the condition that the store close at 10pm (although currently (2018) opens 7am to 11pm), and a pedestrian crossing be installed on Codsall Road.

=== Micropub ===
The first micropub in the West Midlands resides in the centre of Claregate alongside the traffic island at Pendeford Avenue. Approval was granted by city planning chiefs in June 2013. The pub, run by Essington based Morton Brewery, is called 'Hail to the Ale' and serves ale, cider and fruit wines. It received its premises licence in August 2013 despite some opposition from local residents, and after opening its doors on 5 September 2013 proved immediately popular with drinkers. It has since won several CAMRA accolades. The building was previously an antique furniture shop called 'Anything Goes', but is best known locally as the Claregate Post Office.
