= Pendeford =

Suburb of Wolverhampton, England

Coordinates: 52.62327°N 2.14786°W

- Location within the West Midlands
- Population: 5,826 (2011)
- OS grid reference: SJ898026
  - London: 134 miles (216 km) SE
- Metropolitan borough: City of Wolverhampton
- Metropolitan county: West Midlands
- Region: West Midlands
- Country: England
- Sovereign state: United Kingdom
- Post town: WOLVERHAMPTON
- Postcode district: WV8, WV9
- Dialling code: 01902
- Police: West Midlands
- Fire: West Midlands
- Ambulance: West Midlands
- UK Parliament: Wolverhampton North East

Pendeford is a suburb of Wolverhampton, West Midlands, England. Historically part of Staffordshire, it is situated north-north-west of the city centre, within the Oxley ward of the City of Wolverhampton Council. At the 2011 census, the population of Pendeford was 5,826, increasing from 4,356 at the 2001 census.

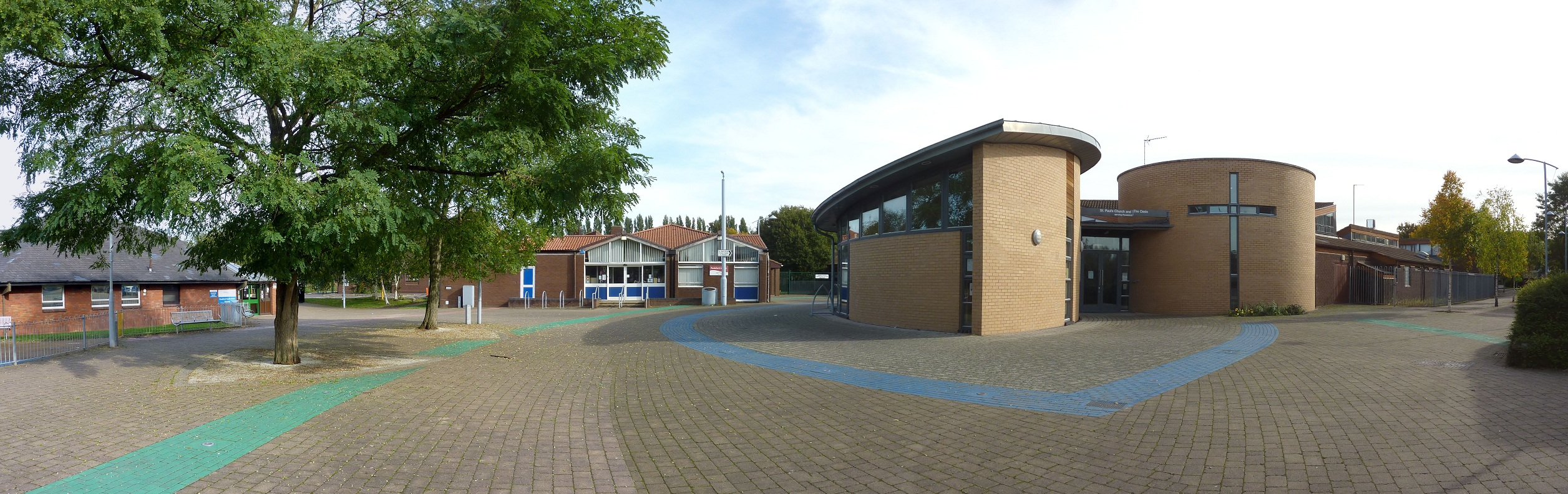
A panoramic image of Pendeford Square

== Name and origins ==
The first known written recording of the place name 'Pendeford', was in the Domesday Book of 1086, where it was recorded with the same spelling as today – a rarity for place names. The name is thought by many toponymists to mean 'Penda's Ford', possibly a crossing over the nearby River Penk named after the Anglo-Saxon King, Penda of Mercia who reigned in Mercia from the year 626. Despite the origin of the name not being set in stone, the recording of the place name in the Domesday Book tells us that Pendeford was in existence at the time of the Norman conquest, and that at the time, Pendeford was held by two Englishmen, Ulstan and Godwin. After the conquest, the land was confiscated and given to a Norman knight called William Fitz-Ansculf, as a reward for serving William the Conqueror.

At this point in time, Pendeford would have been little more than a few scattered buildings amongst woodland, bordered on its eastern side by a lake known in more recent times as Alleycroft Lake (the lake no longer exists, having been drained upon the construction of the Staffordshire and Worcestershire Canal during the 18th century, though a marshy area remains on the site of the new I54 project to the north of Wobaston Road). Pendeford lay near the farthest south-west reaches of Cannock forest, which was much larger than today in early medieval times.

=== Location ===
Despite the modern day Pendeford, with the housing estates Dovecotes, Pendeford Park and Pendford Rise being within the Wolverhampton city border, parts of Dovecotes Estate are within South Staffordshire boundaries. The former site of Pendeford Hall, today the Pendeford Hall Residential Park, constructed after the demolition of the hall in 1968, as well as Pendeford Mill Nature Reserve are in South Staffordshire. The new i54 site is a joint project of Wolverhampton City Council, South Staffordshire District Council and Staffordshire County Council.

== History ==
Pendeford's history dates back to at least the 11th century: a record about it exists in William the Conqueror's Domesday Book.

Dovecotes (Barnhurst) was also part of Pendeford, as was Aldersley.

=== The brook ===
The area has a small brook running through it, but it has been moved and culverted. The majority of the brook now runs underground, although it is above ground next to the subway which goes underneath Blaydon Road. It then carries on for around quarter of a mile before disappearing back underground next to Marholm Close.

=== Pendeford Airfield ===
In the 1930s, Wolverhampton Council decided to establish an airfield at Pendeford, on 178 acres (0.72 km^{2}) of land at Barnhurst formerly used for sewage disposal. The airfield was officially opened on 27 June 1938, by which time Boulton Paul Aircraft had established a factory there. Boulton Paul had separated from its parent in Norwich to move to an area with a suitable workforce to take advantage of the Government Aircraft Expansion Scheme, starting work on their new factory in October 1935. The first Wolverhampton-built aircraft was a sub-contracted Hawker Demon, making a flight in August 1936. Boulton Paul also built their own designs including the Defiant fighter (which had its first flight at Pendeford in August 1937, almost a year before the airfield was officially opened).

During the Second World War the airfield was also used for training air force pilots, with over 100 de Havilland Tiger Moths stationed there at one stage. No. 28 Elementary Flying Training School commenced operations at Pendeford on 15 September 1941 and was operated for the Royal Air Force by Air Schools Ltd. It was renamed No. 25 Reserve Flying School on 26 June 1947, and ceased to operate on 31 March 1953.

The site was also used by No.663 Squadron RAF and No. 1954 Reserve Air Observation Post Flight RAF.

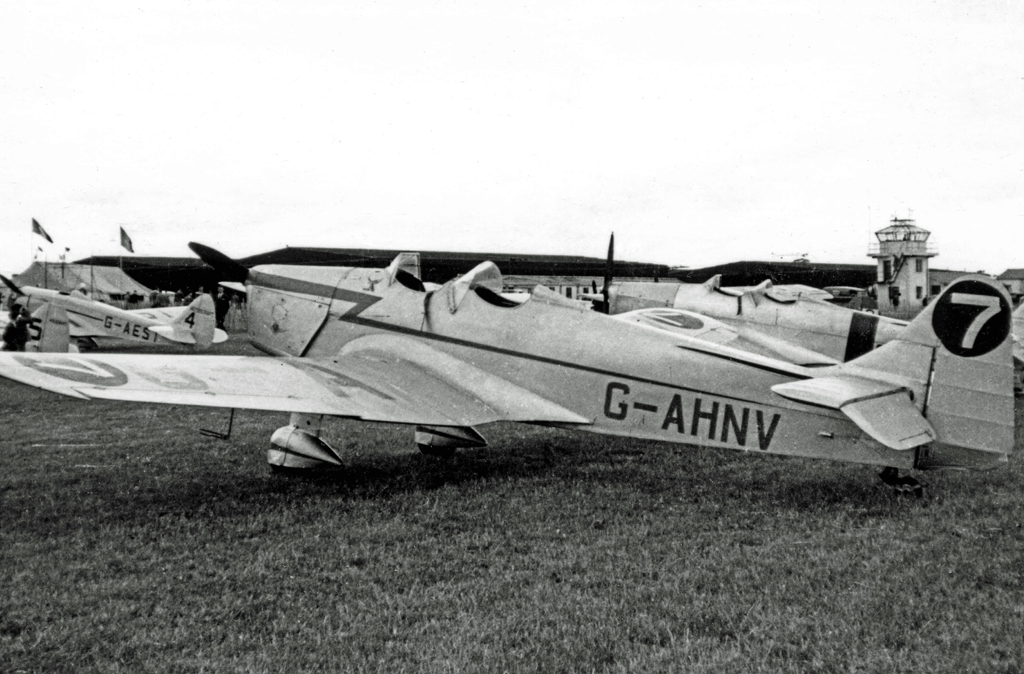
Aircraft at Pendeford Airfield in 1950 showing the black Bellman-type wartime hangars and the airfield control tower (right).

Post-war, the airfield was used for private and training aircraft, with limited scheduled services from 1953. In 1950, the airfield hosted the prestigious Kings Cup air race. By the end of the 1960s the airfield was losing money and there were safety concerns over its close proximity to houses, and the airfield was closed on 31 December 1970. Remaining aircraft transferred to Halfpenny Green airport to the southwest of Wolverhampton. A memorial to the airfield can be seen on the walls of an estate within Pendeford.

Shortly before the airfield's closure, on 9 April 1970, a de Havilland Dove crashed onto a house in Redhurst Drive, Fordhouses and caught fire. The crew of the aircraft (which was owned by Dowty Group, by then the owner of Boulton Paul) were attempting to land at the airfield in poor weather; the accident investigation determined that the aircraft stalled at a height too low for the crew to regain control. An occupant of the house and the two people on board the aircraft were killed in the accident; two more escaped the burning house by jumping out of an upstairs window and were slightly injured.

=== Film location, 1956 ===
In April 1956, the Ealing Studios feature film, The Man in the Sky, starring Jack Hawkins and Elizabeth Sellars, was shot in and around the Pendeford and Oxley areas of Wolverhampton, the majority at Pendeford Airfield.

=== Flooding of 1999 ===
On Monday 5 July 1999 the Wolverhampton area was hit by storms which included a twister. This caused torrential flooding across Pendeford with water reaching depths of 5 feet (1.5 m) in places. Just as families were recovering from the "twister" storms, some faced second insurance claims for new damage to their properties when a second storm hit on Sunday 1 August. Residents were ferried to safety on inflatable rafts by firemen as flood water up to 4 feet (1.2 m) deep from torrential rain swept into their homes. Temporary accommodation was made available at Pendeford High School.

=== IWA National Festival 08 ===
During August Bank Holiday 2008 (23–25 August), the Inland Waterways Association held their National Festival at Pendeford. Over 300 boats, with 300 tents and caravans attended, accompanied by over 250 exhibitors, and the site was visited over the weekend by some 24,000 people. The playing fields behind Halesworth Road and Emsworth Crescent were used for the exhibitions and car parking.

== Present day ==
Today, most of the area is a housing estate built during the 1970s, 1980s and 1990s. The first section to be built was Dovecotes Estate, named 'Dovecotes' because of the old dovecote that still stands to this day, on land that was previously Barnhurst Farm, followed by Pendeford Park and new housing on the north-east side of the Shropshire Union Canal, such as the 'Penwood' estate at Clewley Drive. The newest part of Pendeford, known as 'Richmond Park', was completed in the late 1990s with 'Pendeford Rise' being completed in the early 1990s. All of the estate has been built on the site of the former Wolverhampton Aerodrome, the Boulton Paul Ltd aircraft factory and Barnhurst Farm.

Fordhouses Cricket Club (formerly Dowty's until the late 1990s) is situated on the border of Pendeford & Wobaston / Fordhouses, on Wobaston Road. As well as the sports aspect, it is a social club which requires a yearly membership to gain access.

Previously there was a pub in Dovecotes called the Dovecote at Ryefield, though this closed in the mid-2000s and after a refurbishment became Pendeford Seventh-day Adventist Church in 2006.

== Education ==
There are two primary schools in Pendeford – St Paul's Church of England Aided Primary School, which is situated in the Pendeford Square near the local amenities, and Dovecotes Primary School on Dovecotes Estate. Nearby in neighbouring Oxley, is Rakegate Primary School. There are also two high schools nearby on opposite borders of Pendeford – Aldersley High School to the west and Pendeford Business and Enterprise College to the east. A third school, Priory Green Primary School, existed until relatively recently, but was shut down due to an Ofsted report. The school building are now used by Wolverhampton City Social Services.

=== St Paul's Church of England Aided Primary School ===
St Paul's School opened in Pendeford on 25 January 1982. The church was established within the school later that year. The church font, which dates back to Norman times, was placed in the chapel after being moved from St. Michael's Church in Tettenhall. In 1987 a new porch was built at the entrance to the church where a cross and bell were added at a cost of £7,000. Today the church is still located partially inside St Paul's Primary School however in 2005 a new chapel was built and it is now accessible during the daytime. The "Oasis" community café, built as an extension to the church/school building, was opened in September 2005.

=== Priory Green Primary School ===
Priory Green was originally opened as Priory Green Infant School in 1981 and Priory Green Junior School in 1984. Following the departure of Mr Colin Edwards, the headmaster of Priory Green Primary School, a decision was made to merge the two schools and create a combined primary school under the former headmistress of the Infant school, Ms Pursehouse. This happened in c.1997. Priory Green Primary School was placed under special measures in 2009, and the school closed at the end of the 2009/2010 academic year on 31 August 2010, allowing the neighbouring school, St Paul's, some of the land.

=== Dovecotes Primary School ===
Dovecotes Primary School is located within the neighbouring estate of Dovecotes. There are pupils from Pendeford who also attend this school. Dovecotes Infants School opened in 1978 with Dovecotes Junior School being built in 1979.

=== Rakegate Primary School ===
Rakegate Primary School is located within the adjoining estate of Oxley. Like Dovecotes Primary School there are pupils from Pendeford who attend this school. The original school was built in the 1950s but has since been redeveloped and is now a brand new 21st century modern primary school which opened in 2007 for the 2007/2008 academic year. Like Priory Green, Rakegate was originally an Infants and Junior school but became a new Primary School in 2003 for the 2003/2004 academic year.

=== Aldersley High School ===
Aldersley High School is situated on Barnhurst Lane, and is school of choice for the majority of children from the Dovecotes area. Despite the name, Aldersley High School is not in Aldersley, but straddles the Wolverhampton / South Staffordshire border on the western edge of Pendeford, surrounded on two sides by countryside.

=== North East Wolverhampton Academy ===
Previously known as 'Pendeford High School', it started life as a comprehensive school in September 1968. It was created by merger of two separate schools, Wobaston Secondary School and Wolverhampton Grammar Technical School. Wobaston Secondary School transferred to its new building in 1957 which was known as 'lower school'. It had however existed on this site since 1942. The school then went by the name of Fordhouses Senior Mixed School using the old huts between the two buildings and the buildings near the tennis courts which were used for woodwork and are now the Pendeford Youth Club. The air-raid shelters were kept for a time as a reminder of a different age. The Grammar Technical School, previously known as the Technical High School and before that the Intermediate School, transferred from its central Wolverhampton site in Old Hall Street in 1963 to the building which was known as 'upper school'. Finally in 1968 the two buildings were merged and renamed Pendeford High school. In a similar way to Aldersley High School, Pendeford High School is actually situated just outside Pendeford, in the Wobaston/Fordhouses area. The school was renamed Pendeford Business and Enterprise College after gaining specialist status as a Business and Enterprise College. In September 2010 the school merged with Northicote School. The new combined school was named North East Wolverhampton Academy, and was originally located over both former school sites before relocating to a newly constructed and refurbished campus in September 2014 at the former Pendeford Business and Enterprise College site. In 2017 it was renamed Ormiston NEW Academy.

The sculpture near the front entrance of the Lower School is made from Portland stone and sculptured by John Paddison, a former pupil of the Technical High School and a former lecturer in the Fine Art department of the Wolverhampton Polytechnic, also a Fish pond was also installed in an courtyard near the assembly hall in Upper School

== Transport links ==
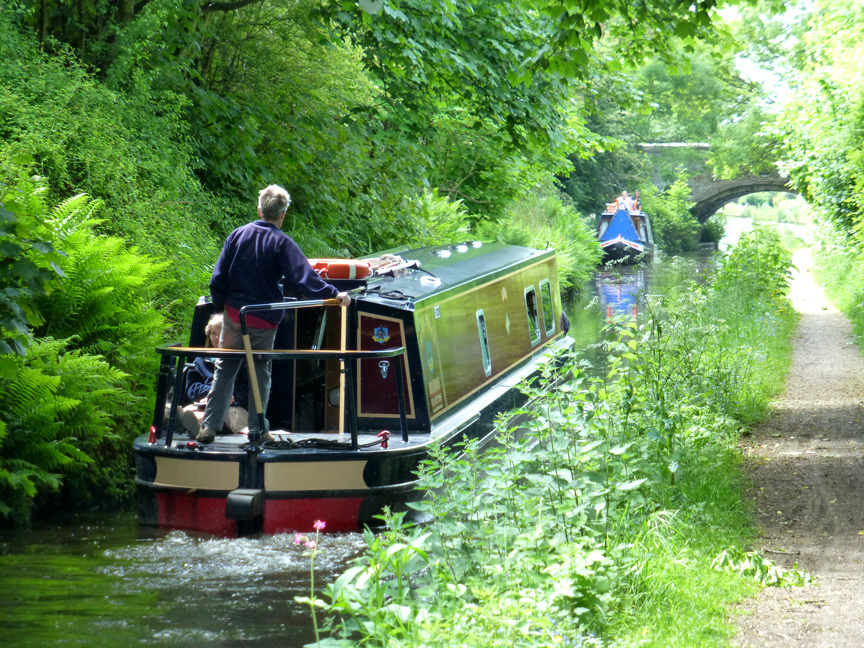
Pendeford Rockin', a narrow cutting in the sandstone on the Staffordshire & Worcestershire Canal

Autherley Junction to the south of Pendeford is the junction of the Shropshire Union Canal and the Staffordshire and Worcestershire Canal. These canals border Pendeford and other local areas including Oxley, Fordhouses, and Dovecotes. Within 1-mile (1.6 km) of Pendeford there is access to the M54 motorway via Stafford Road (A449) at Junction 2. Pendeford also has good bus links with Wolverhampton City Centre and other parts of the city. The routes that service Pendeford are National Express West Midlands services 4,6, 6A and Chaserider 25. During school term time, school bus services 784 and 716 operate between Pendeford Bus Terminus at Whitburn Close and the Kings School, Tettenhall. The 784 departs from there at 8.08 am with the return journey terminating at 16.15 pm and the 716 departs at 8.15 am and terminates at 16.25 pm.

Wobaston Road is the only section of Wolverhampton's outer ring road ever built.

=== Cycle Route ===
Pendeford benefits from an off-road cycle route, much of which was constructed at the same time as the housing estate. It runs from its newest section at Pendeford Business Park, winding through the Pendeford Park estate and shopping centre, making use of two underpasses at The Droveway and Blaydon Road before it enters Dovecotes, ending after a third underpass at Ryefield as Long Furrow opposite Aldersley High School.

== Recreation ==
Recreation has been a key part of Pendeford for many years and it is now developing further for the benefit of everyone in and around the area.

=== St. John Ambulance ===
Pendeford is also home to a unit of St. John Ambulance known as Pendeford Badgers (5–10yrs) and Pendeford All Services Unit (Cadets 10-18yrs and Adults 18yrs+) who teach First Aid and various other life saving skills to volunteer members. Pendeford Badgers were known as Woodland Badgers and Pendeford All Services Unit as Pendeford Quadrilateral until March 2014 and before that Priory Green Quadrilateral until the end of 2010. The name change was to remove its association from Priory Green Primary School following its demise in August 2010. Pendeford All Services Unit celebrated its 16th birthday in 2010 where as Pendeford Badgers celebrated its 21st birthday in 2010. In 2015 Pendeford All Services Unit celebrated its 21st Birthday with a Masquerade Ball.

=== Pendeford Community Hub ===
This is a new facility that is being created using the existing Priory Green Community Centre and Pendeford Library buildings. Locally known as a "Community Hub". Following a lengthy consultation period which has caused some controversy in certain parts of the city, the work was due to commence in September 2013 and planned for completion and launch in March 2014. Priory Green Community Centre is currently home to Pendeford Pre-School which has used this location since the early 1980s and After School Club since the 1990s. It is also the base for St. John Ambulance in Pendeford who have met there since 1989. It is thought that all three community services will continue on their existing days and times after the work is completed. The Youth Services provision which is currently provided by Wolverhampton City Council at the Mirage Youth Centre will move into the new "Hub" following the completion of the works.

=== Playgrounds ===
In Pendeford there are a number of small children's playgrounds, the oldest being the one at the end of Howland Close near to the Mirage Youth Centre. This park is known to many as the spider park as it has a large metal spider that is a climbing frame.

Work started, in January 2009, on the green in front of the Haymarket/Dovecote/Church creating a New Playground for kids including swings, slide, sunken stepping logs. Along with various benches for local residents. It was completed finished in March 2009 and is opposite Dovecotes Primary School.

A playground/park used to exist on a field alongside The Droveway, at the back of Clewley Drive, though this was dismantled c. 2000.

In 2005 a new playground was opened in Pendeford Square\Piazza as part of the redevelopment work that took place for St Paul's Church and The Oasis Café. The playground backs on to Pendeford Health Centre.

=== Mirage Youth Centre ===
Also in Howland Close is The Mirage Youth Centre (Mirage). The Mirage opened in 1992 and has been helping develop young people in Pendeford since then. The Mirage Youth Centre is due to close during 2013 as the youth provision will be moved in the new Pendeford Library, Youth and Community Centre which is being created. Details on the Mirage can be found here.

=== Pendeford Youth Club ===
Like the Mirage, there was also Pendeford Youth Club. However this was not based in Pendeford. It was located within the ground of Pendeford Business and Enterprise College in Fordhouses. This was how the youth club gained its name. Pendeford Youth Club no longer exists, however the building is being used as part of the North East Wolverhampton Academy called the Whitehouse which is used for students who need to be away from lessons.

=== Ball park ===
In the early 2000s (decade), there was a ball park/sports court opened by ex Wolverhampton Wanderers F.C. player/legend Steve Bull and Wolverhampton hockey professional Rachael Heyhoe-Flint. In 2006 the site was fitted with flood lighting to allow the site to be used for recreation after dark.

=== Pendeford Mill Nature Reserve ===
On the South Staffordshire side of Pendeford, there is a nature reserve which is known as Pendeford Mill Nature Reserve. The reserve dates back to the 13th century and provides a stable and protected habitat for wildlife.

=== Girlguiding UK – Rainbows ===
Within Pendeford there has been a Rainbows pack meeting at St. Pauls C of E School. They are known as 1st Pendeford Rainbows. Details on 1st Pendeford Rainbows can be found here.

=== Bilbrook Juniors F.C. ===
Bilbrook Juniors F.C., consisting of twenty teams in both the Stourbridge & District Youth League and Midland Junior Premier League, are based in Pendeford with pitches on Pendeford Lane and Wobaston Road.

== Claims to fame ==
=== Denise Lewis ===
Pendeford for many years has been the home to Olympic athlete Denise Lewis after she and her family moved here from West Bromwich.

=== Escape of Charles II ===
Whilst fleeing from Parliamentarian soldiers, Charles, son of Charles I and later to become King Charles II passed through the area whilst being escorted by the Penderel (or Pendrell) brothers and Francis Yates between Boscobel House and Moseley Hall on the evening of 7 September 1651. Charles rode an old horse that had been provided by the miller, Humphrey Penderel. During the journey, the horse stumbled, leading Humphrey Penderel to joke that it was "not to be wondered at, for it had the weight of three Kingdoms upon its back". At Pendeford Mill, the party stopped and Charles dismounted, it being deemed unsafe to continue riding. Three of the Penderel brothers took the horse back, while Richard and John Penderel along with Francis Yates continued with Charles to Moseley Hall. This section of Charles's escape can be approximately followed by walking the Monarch's Way long-distance footpath.

== Business links ==
=== Pendeford Business Park ===
Pendeford's business park, accessible through The Overstrand from Wobaston Road, houses businesses including Lloyds Banking Group formerly Birmingham Midshires, Adas UK Ltd, Canon, KJM Beauty Products, Mowlem, and Westbury Homes. The Park is adjacent to the 'i54' major investment site.

=== i54 Wobaston Road ===

The 90-hectare i54 site to the north west of the city seeks to attract a single high quality manufacturing facility along with a range of prestigious offices, research facilities and a hotel. The first tenant is Moog aircraft group, who have relocated from the former Dowty Boulton Paul premises to the west on Wobaston Road, moving in during September 2012. On 30 October 2014, Queen Elizabeth II and the Duke of Edinburgh visited Pendeford to open the Jaguar Land Rover manufacturing plant and International Security Printers (ISP), printers of postage stamps.

National Express West Midlands have re-routed their number 6 Pendeford bus route to service the i54, as well as creating the new 54 service between Wolverhampton and Bilbrook which calls at the i54 site both outgoing and incoming.

=== Turner Sports Cars ===
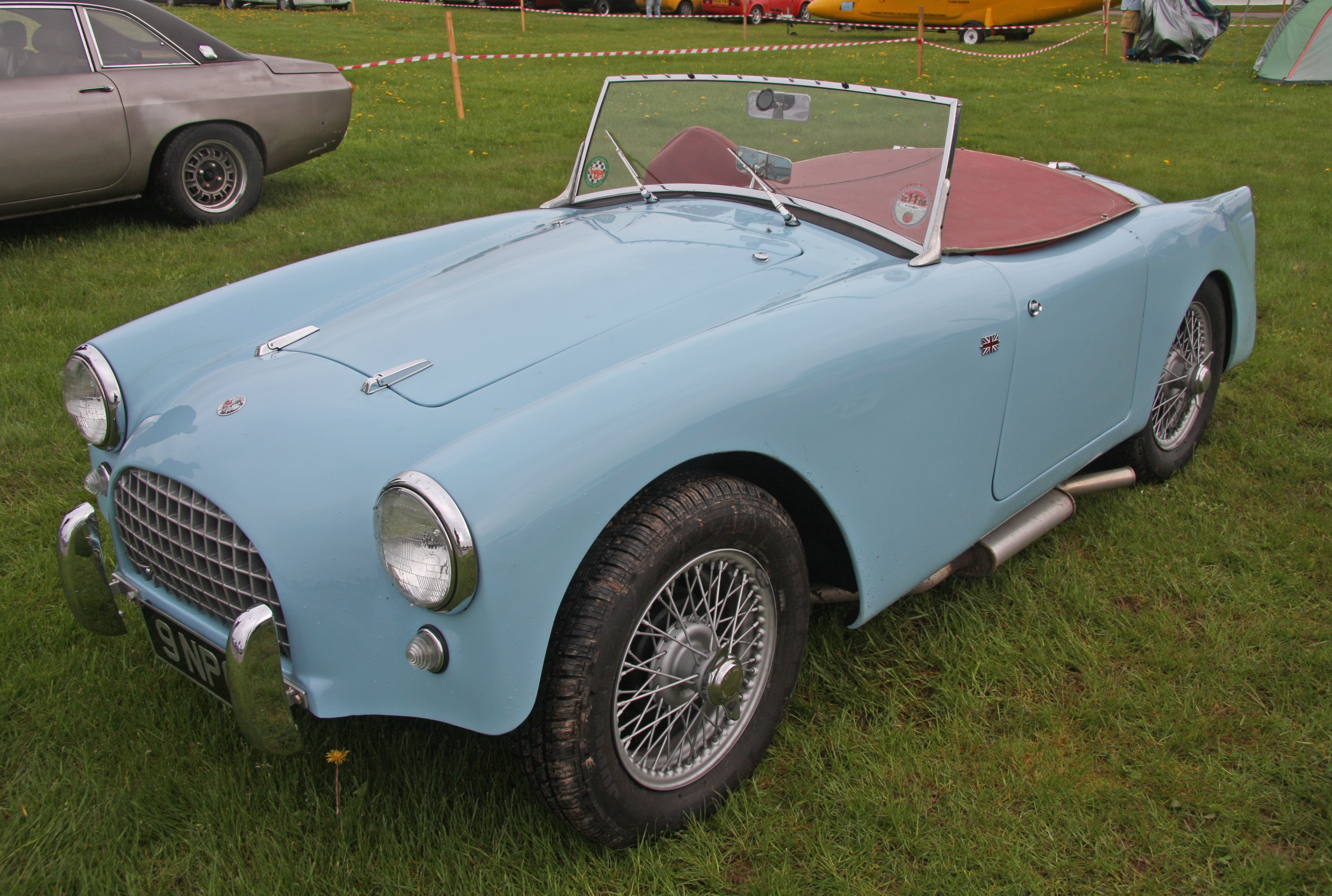
Turner 950 Sports

In 1956 Turner Sports Cars moved to its final location in Pendeford at Pendeford Airport. After moving here from 32 Merridale Street. Car production continued through until early 1966 at the site in Pendeford when the doors were closed.

=== Birmingham Midshires ===
Birmingham Midshires moved their headquarters to Pendeford Business Park in the mid-1990s. It previously had an office in Cardiff, South Wales, but the operations from this office were moved to Pendeford to make way for a Halifax Building Society office. Since January 2011 it was renamed 'Lloyds Banking Group'.

=== Jaguar Land Rover ===
In September 2011, the company confirmed that it would be investing £355 million in the construction of a new engine plant at the i54 business park. This will be used to manufacture a family of four-cylinder petrol and diesel engines.
