= Dovecote (disambiguation) =

Dovecote, also called doocot in Scottish English is a building for pigeons or doves.

Dovecote may also refer to:

- Dovecote Records, a New York-based record label
- Dovecote Novices' Hurdle, a British Grade 2 National Hunt hurdle race
- The Dovecote, an Association Football stadium in Shepshed, Leicestershire, home to Shepshed Dynamo F.C. and formerly home to Shepshed Albion F.C. (known as Shepshed Charterhouse from 1975 to 1992)
- Dovecotes, Wolverhampton, a housing estate in Pendeford, Wolverhampton

== See also ==
- Flutter in the Dovecote, a 1986 novel by Scottish writer Bruce Marshall
- Dovecot (disambiguation)
