= Aldersley High School =

Location
- Barnhurst Lane; Pendeford; Wolverhampton, West Midlands, WV8 1RT; England; 52.6183°N 2.16256°W

Information
- Type: Academy
- Motto: Be Prepared : Show Respect : Challenge Yourself
- Local authority: Wolverhampton City Council
- Trust: Amethyst Academies Trust
- Department for Education URN: 139138 Tables
- Ofsted: Reports
- Head teacher: Stefan blower
- Gender: Mixed
- Age: 11 to 18
- Enrolment: 1368 as of September 2023
- Website: http://aldersley.aatrust.co.uk/

Aldersley High School is a mixed secondary school and sixth form located in the Pendeford area of Wolverhampton in the West Midlands of England.

Despite the name, Aldersley High School is not in Aldersley, but straddles the Wolverhampton / South Staffordshire border on the western edge of Pendeford, surrounded on two sides by countryside.Many pupils who attend the school come from the Dovecotes area of Wolverhampton, however recently more students are attending from as far as Fordhouses.

== History ==
Previously a foundation school administered by Wolverhampton City Council, Aldersley High School converted to academy status in January 2013 and is now sponsored by the Amethyst Academies Trust. However the school continues to coordinate with Wolverhampton City Council for admissions.

In 2012 a BMX track was constructed on the school grounds, one of the first (and to date only) such tracks at a school in England. Work started in 2013 to construct a new theatre and remodel existing buildings, in preparation for an increase in capacity from 700 to 1,050.

In 2016, a former vice-principal of the school, Daljit Kaur, was convicted for committing fraud whilst at the school. Kaur was subsequently banned from teaching for life.

A new sixth form centre was built at Aldersley High School in 2019, which houses the entire sixth form provision for the Amethyst Academies Trust, and so includes sixth form students from Moreton School.

== Academics ==
Aldersley High School offers GCSEs and BTECs as programmes of study for pupils, while students in the sixth form have the option to study from a range of A-levels and further BTECs.
