= Ormiston NEW Academy =

Coordinates: 52.6228°N 2.1392°W

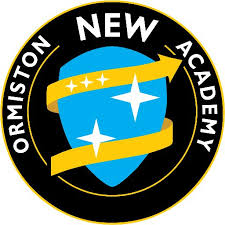

Location
- Marsh Lane; Fordhouses; Wolverhampton, West Midlands, WV10 6SE; England

Information
- Type: Academy
- Local authority: Wolverhampton City Council
- Trust: Ormiston Academies Trust
- Department for Education URN: 145134 Tables
- Ofsted: Reports
- Principal: Craig Cooling
- Gender: Mixed
- Age: 11 to 18
- Enrolment: 985 as of April 2016
- Houses: Snowdon, Nevis, Scafell
- Colour: _{Snowdon} _{Nevis} _{Scafell}
- Website: http://www.onewa.co.uk

Ormiston NEW Academy (formerly North East Wolverhampton Academy) is a mixed secondary school and sixth form located in the Fordhouses area of Wolverhampton in the West Midlands of England.

== History ==
Previously known as 'Pendeford High School', it started life as a comprehensive school in September 1968. It was created by merger of two separate schools, Wobaston Secondary School and Wolverhampton Grammar Technical School. Wobaston Secondary School transferred to its new building in 1957 which was known as 'lower school'. It had however existed on this site since 1942. The school then went by the name of Fordhouses Senior Mixed School using the old huts between the two buildings and the buildings near the tennis courts which were used for woodwork and are now the Pendeford Youth Club. The air-raid shelters were kept for a time as a reminder of a different age. The Grammar Technical School, previously known as the Technical High School and before that the Intermediate School, transferred from its central Wolverhampton site in Old Hall Street in 1963 to the building which was known as 'upper school'. Finally in 1968 the two buildings were merged and renamed Pendeford High school.

The school was renamed Pendeford Business and Enterprise College after gaining specialist status as a Business and Enterprise College. In September 2010 the school merged with Northicote School. The new combined school was named North East Wolverhampton Academy, and was originally located over both former school sites before relocating to a newly constructed and refurbished campus in September 2014 at the former Pendeford Business and Enterprise College site.

In September 2017 Ormiston Academies Trust took over sponsorship of the school from the previous sponsor, the City of Wolverhampton Academy Trust, and the school's name was changed to Ormiston NEW Academy. Craig Cooling was appointed as principal in September 2019.

== Academics ==
Ormiston NEW Academy offers GCSEs as programmes of study for pupils, while students in the sixth form have the option to study from a range of A-levels and BTECs.

== Notable former pupils ==
=== Ormiston NEW Academy ===
- Levi Andoh, footballer

=== Pendeford High School ===
- Jane Kelly, artist

=== Wolverhampton Grammar Technical School ===
- Richard Barnes, politician

== Notable staff ==
- Richard Forsyth, former footballer
