= Hilton Park =

Hilton Park has a number of different meanings:

- Hilton Park services, a Motorway Service Area on the M6 Motorway north of Wolverhampton, England. Named after Hilton Hall, the stately home in whose grounds it was built.
- Hilton Park (stadium), the former home ground for Leigh RMI and Leigh Centurions in Greater Manchester, England
- Hilton Park, Clones, County Monaghan, Ireland - a stately home
- Hilton Park, Dover, New Hampshire
