= Fordhouses =

Coordinates: 52.63005°N 2.12555°W

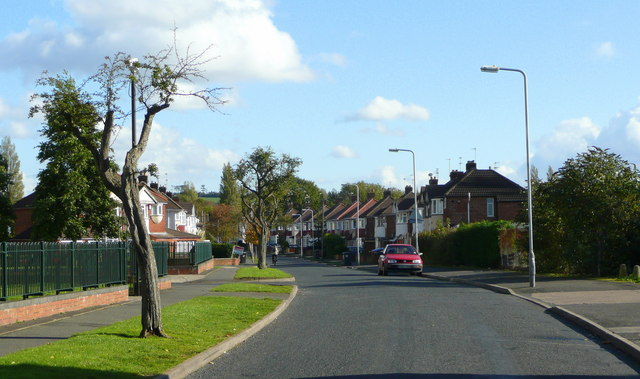
- Harrowby Road, Fordhouses

- Location within the West Midlands
- Population: 3,003 (Wobaston - 2001 Census)
- Metropolitan borough: Wolverhampton
- Metropolitan county: West Midlands
- Region: West Midlands
- Country: England
- Sovereign state: United Kingdom
- Post town: WOLVERHAMPTON
- Postcode district: WV10
- Dialling code: 01902
- Police: West Midlands
- Fire: West Midlands
- Ambulance: West Midlands
- UK Parliament: Wolverhampton

Fordhouses is a suburb of Wolverhampton, West Midlands, England. It is situated to the north of the city centre, adjacent to the border with Staffordshire, within the Bushbury North ward of Wolverhampton City Council. It is the most northerly part of the city alongside Pendeford, adjacent to the M54 motorway.

== Name and origins ==
The place name 'Fordhouses' refers to the houses situated alongside the Wolverhampton to Stafford road next to where the road crosses the Wobaston Brook. In 14th century subsidy rolls, folk living here were described as being 'atte forde'. This is the earliest known reference to people living in this area, though the nearby Wobaston place name is said by toponymists to derive from 'Wibaldes tun' - likely the early English / Anglo-Saxon 'Wigbeald', with 'tun' meaning homestead or farmstead - so the name would literally mean the farmstead of Wigbeald.

== Modern times ==
Fordhouses was struck by an F1/T2 tornado on 23 November 1981, as part of the record-breaking nationwide tornado outbreak on that day. The tornado later moved out over Wolverhampton city centre, causing further damage.

Today, Fordhouses stretches over a large area, as far south as Oxley, as far west as Pendeford, as far north as Junction 2 of the M54 at Coven Heath and as far east as Bushbury. It encompasses several smaller areas, such as Wobaston, Snapes Green, the Harrowby estate and Lesscroft. The area is a mix of housing and industrial, with many rows of industrial units in the north-east along the Wobaston and Stafford Roads, such as HS Marston Aerospace and Spectre UK Ltd, with housing taking up much of the rest of the area.

== Shops and amenities ==
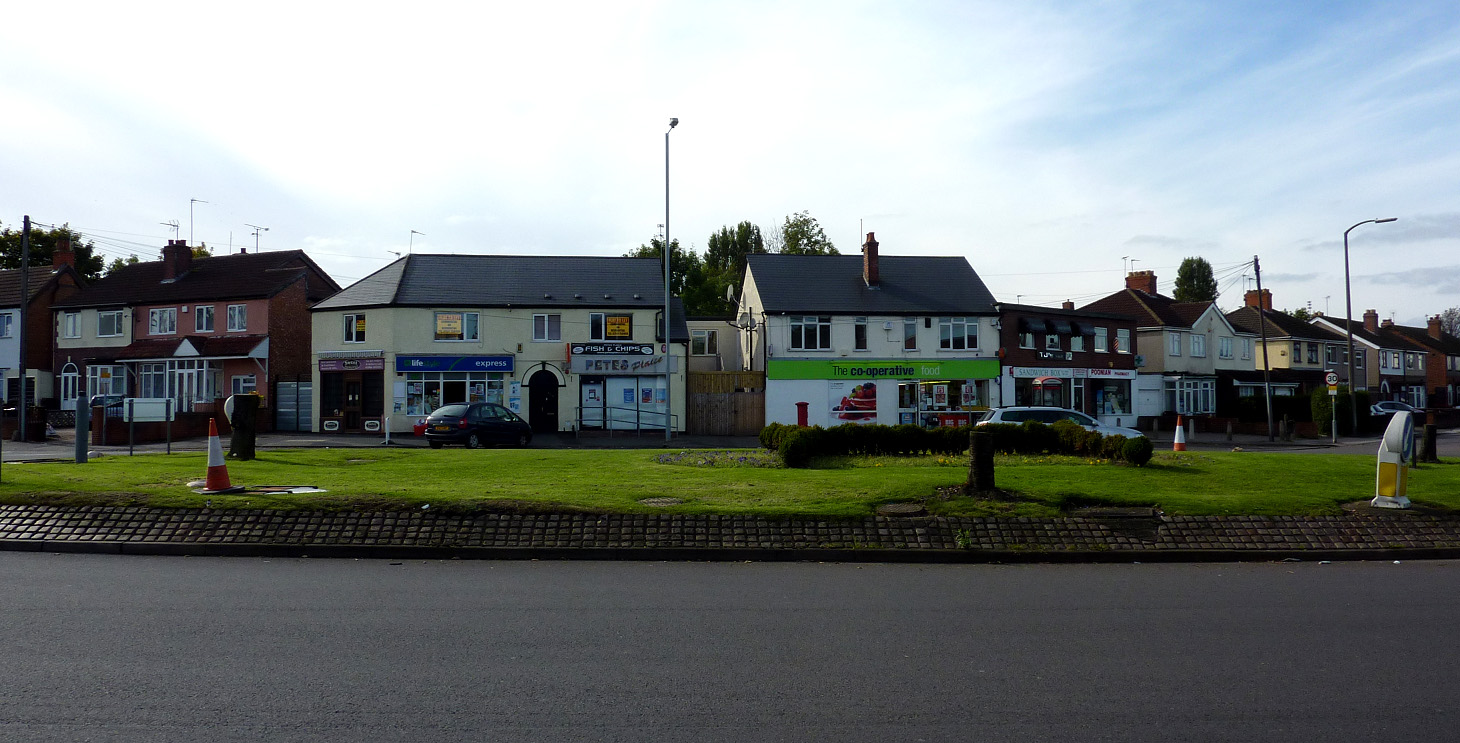
Shops at Vine Island, Wobaston

There are two focal points in the central Fordhouses area - both straddling the Stafford Road. The first being the shops at Vine Island in Wobaston. This shopping area is now served by its own road and car parks running counter to the traffic, accessed via the Wobaston Road.

The other local shops are slightly further north on a slip road running off the southbound arm of the Stafford Road. On Harrowby Road there is a small row of shops.

== People, groups & organisations ==
The mixed voice choir group, The Marston Singers, are a Fordhouses-based choir group. They formed in 1961 when Keith Lloyd along with other employees from engineering company Marston Excelsior Limited set up a small choir. Though this disbanded in 1964, the choir were back in 1970 and continue to this day. Fordhouses also has an Air Training Corps squadron based on Bee Lane.

== Sport ==
Fordhouses is home to Fordhouses Cricket Club, located on the Wobaston Road at the border with Pendeford.

Until 2010 a second cricket club sat within the estate, giving its name to the road Cricket Meadow. The land, including that of a small farm which sat alongside, has since been developed as a housing estate called Boundary Park. The farm house itself has been kept as a part of the housing estate.

Several football teams play at the nearby Goodrich Sports Ground, located within Goodrich's works on the Stafford Road. These include Goodrich F.C. and their youth team. Wolverhampton Wanderers W.F.C. also used the ground until the end of the 2011-12 season.
