= Gorsebrook =

Historic area in the West Midlands, England

Coordinates: 52.6028°N 2.1300°W

- Location within the West Midlands
- Metropolitan borough: Wolverhampton
- Metropolitan county: West Midlands
- Region: West Midlands
- Country: England
- Sovereign state: United Kingdom
- Post town: Wolverhampton
- Postcode district: WV
- Dialling code: 01902
- Police: West Midlands
- Fire: West Midlands
- Ambulance: West Midlands
- UK Parliament: Wolverhampton South West

Gorsebrook is an historic area of Wolverhampton, West Midlands, located alongside the Stafford Road between the areas of Dunstall, Oxley and Bushbury.

== Place name and origins ==
The first mention of Gorsebrook is in the 985 AD Charter where King Æthelred grants 10 hides of land to Wulfrun primarily in the Wolverhampton area. The place name appears in the bounds of the grant, in Old English at both the beginning and the end as gose broc. The modern translation for this is goose brook. The brook in question likely refers to the section of the Smestow Brook that winds east to west through this area.

== History ==
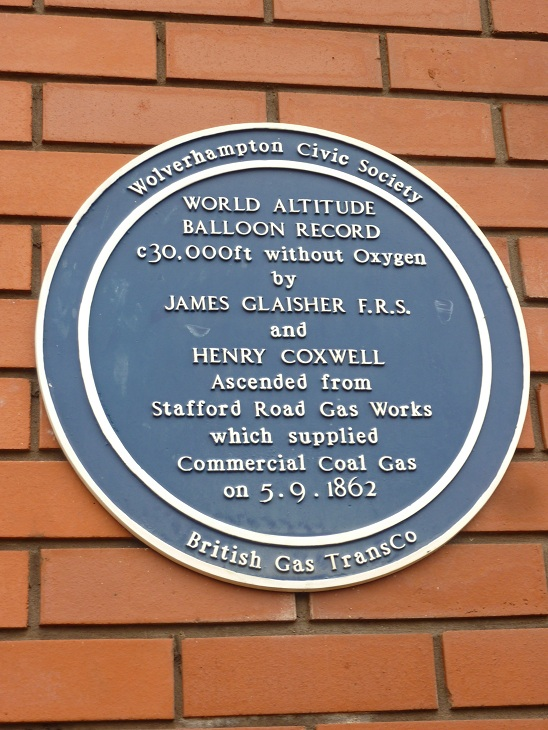
Blue Plaque commemorating the World Altitude Balloon Record

Not much is known about Gorsebrook throughout most of its history. The early English place name relates to the brook running through the centre of the area. In 1849, the Stafford Road Works opened in Gorsebrook, to build and maintain locomotives. The works had what was at one time regarded as Wolverhampton's best football club, Stafford Road F.C., founded in 1876 by works manager Charles Crump. By the 1902 Ordnance Survey, the area represented the northern edge of Wolverhampton's industry, with terraced houses running along the west side of the Stafford Road opposite the earlier Gorsebrook House, and into Jones Road. North of this area were fields and the odd small settlement. From the 1920s onwards, the area to the north was considerably developed, with housing estates springing up, as the area took on a look that is still familiar to us today. In 1934, an Odeon cinema was opened in Gorsebrook, known as the 'Dunstall Odeon', though it was to close in 1960 becoming a bingo hall. Opposite the cinema stood The Croft pub. In February 1964, Stafford Road works closed. The widening of the Stafford Road in the 1980s saw the clearing of many terraced properties and other buildings on the west side including the Bushbury Garage and Dunstall Cinema building, for the creation of the north bound carriageway.

=== Gorsebrook House ===
During the early 19th Century, Gorsebrook House was the home of a solicitor, John Corser and his wife Elizabeth. The Ordnance Survey First Series – Sheet 62, which covers Wolverhampton, shows Gorsebrook as Gosbrook. At the time, Gorsebrook House stood alongside the Stafford Road in a very rural area. In the 1890s, the Electric Construction Corporation Ltd (ECC) built their workshops on land belonging to Gorsebrook House to the east, the House becoming the companies head office. In 1900, the building was home to the first Works Manager of the Electric Construction Corporation, a Richard Jones. Gorsebrook House was demolished in the 1950s.

=== World Altitude Balloon Record ===
On Friday 5 September 1862, a world altitude balloon record was set by James Glaisher and Henry Coxwell, launching from the site of Stafford Road Gas Works. The balloon was filled with coal gas from the site, and reached an altitude of c30,000 feet without use of Oxygen by the pilots. This feat is commemorated by a blue plaque on the wall of a Wolverhampton Science Park building, as well as the naming of three roads – Coxwell Avenue and Glaisher Drive after the balloon pilots, and Mammoth Drive after the name of the balloon. The Aeronauts, released in 2019, includes a fictionalised account of the 5 September 1862 flight, though omits Gorsebrook and the Wolverhampton area altogether, replacing Coxwell with a female character called Amelia Wren.

== Today ==
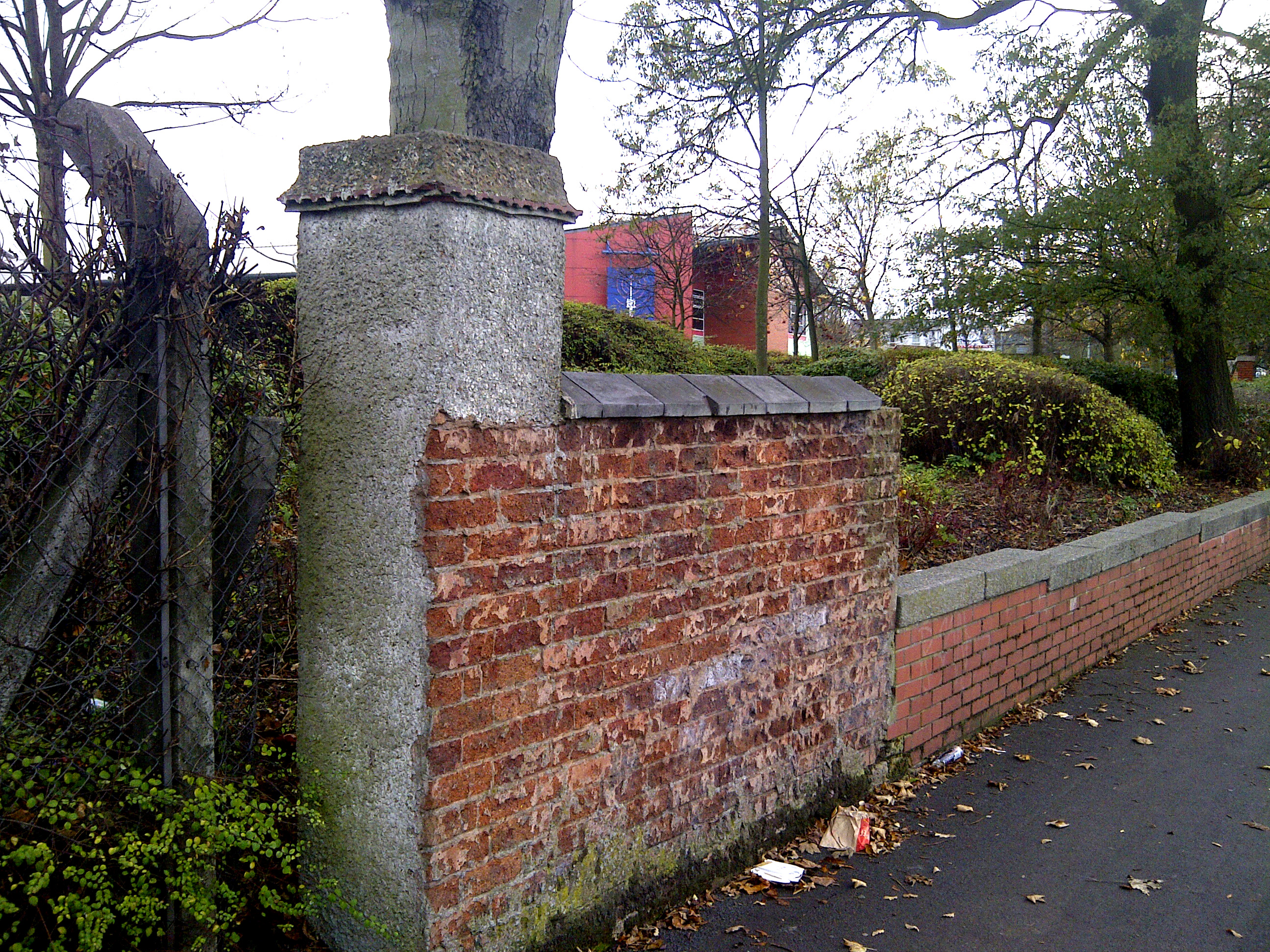
Section of wall and mature trees at Gorsebrook

Only sections of wall and mature trees indicate that an older building once stood alongside the east side of the Stafford Road in this area. The section of the Smestow Brook bearing the name 'Gorsebrook', is now culverted, disappearing in Fowlers Park to the east and resurfacing at the other side of Dunstall Park racecourse to the west. A memorial to the Stafford Road Works exists on the south side of Gorsebrook Road near the junction with Stafford Road.

Local amenities include Jones Road Working Men's Club, a McDonald's drive through, Jones Road Newsagents, Tastebuds Café, Bushbury Working Men's Club, Strykers bowling alley (now closed), Wikid Pets (now closed), Dunstall Park Garage, Eurofit, Rainbow office furniture, and a café and Costa Coffee on Wolverhampton Science Park. The Croft pub was renamed The Island House upon the creation of the dual carriageway, this is now The Island House fish and chip restaurant and takeaway. A new traffic island was put in recently as part of the Kentucky Fried Chicken franchise on the same site. The only remaining remnant of the Electric Construction Company is its sports club, on Showell Road.

Wikid Pets on Gorsebrook Road (now closed and the building belongs to the Eurofit group) often features in the local press for its variety of animals and attractions.

=== Wolverhampton Science Park ===
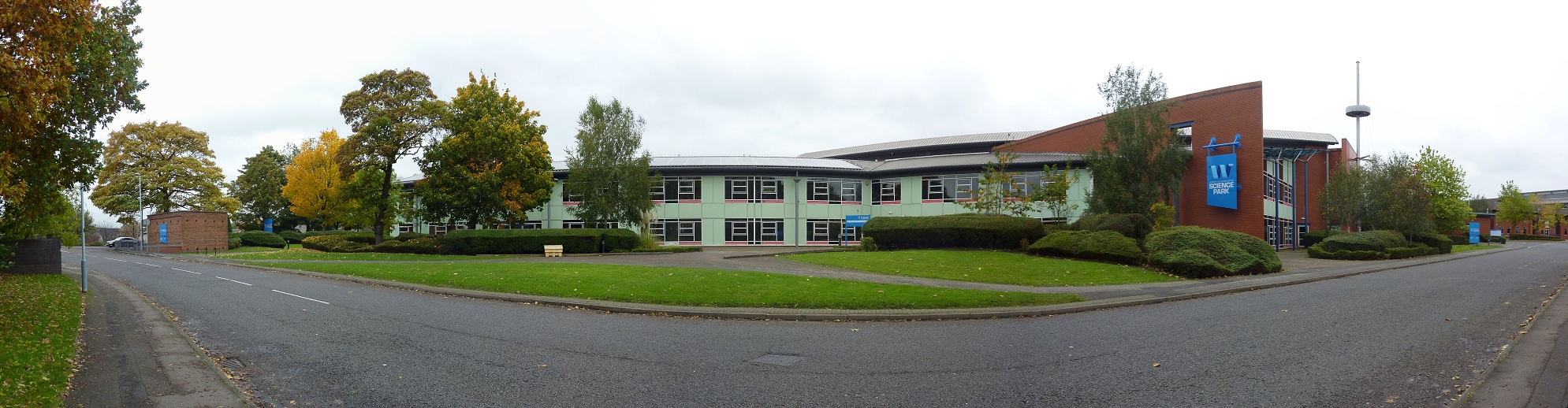
Wolverhampton Science Park

Wolverhampton Science Park, constructed in phases between 1995 and 2003, occupies the site of the old House and Electric Construction Corporation. The Science Park is a joint operation between the University of Wolverhampton and Wolverhampton City Council, to promote and support the development of innovative businesses by providing a working environment and support services. Businesses based at the Science Park include the Healthcare Improvement Partnership (Wolverhampton City & Walsall) Ltd, Hutchison Scientific Services Ltd and SPRUNG Ltd amongst many others.

Wolverhampton Science Park was constructed with the help of funding from Advantage West Midlands and the European Regional Development Fund. The entire site occupies 55,000 square feet of land.
