= Frankley services =

Motorway service station in Worcestershire, England

Frankley Services
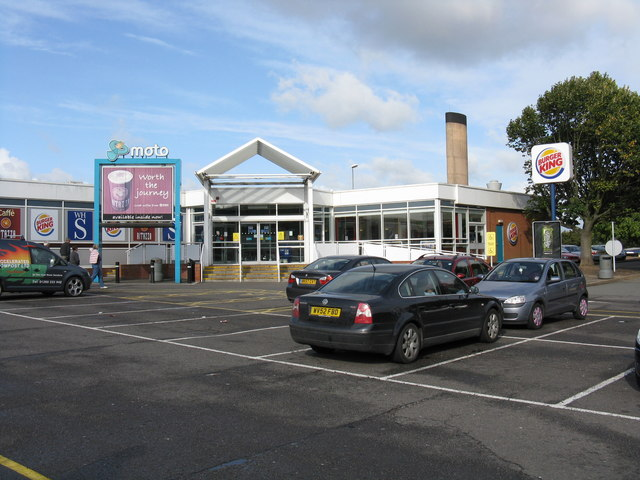
- The northbound main building.

- Location within Worcestershire

Information
- County: Worcestershire
- Road: M5 motorway
- Coordinates: 52.4291°N 2.01794°W
- Operator: Moto Hospitality
- Date opened: 1966
- Website: Northbound moto-way.com/services/frankley-northbound/; Southbound moto-way.com/services/frankley-southbound

Frankley services is a motorway service station on the M5 motorway between Junctions 3 (A456, Quinton Interchange) and 4 (A38, Lydiate Ash), near Birmingham, and taking its name from the nearby village of Frankley. It is owned by Moto.

== History ==
Frankley was one of the first service stations of its kind when it was opened in 1966 by Granada Motorway Services to serve the new motorway which by 1977 gave the Midlands an unbroken motorway link with Devon.

The first proposal was given in July 1962. The site at Frankley was first announced in May 1963. There would be no footbridge between both sides. All other service areas had a footbridge. Granada were given the contract in early September 1963.

The £612,000 contract for the site was awarded on 22 December 1964 to Higgs and Hill.

It was planned to be finished by the end of 1965. It was Granada's second motorway service station, after Toddington; its third would be Heston in 1968. There would be room for 640 people in the restaurants, and 300 parking spaces.

The motorway section opened on 16 November 1965, and it was hoped that the service area would open too, but it was not finished. It was planned that the petrol site would open in January 1966, and catering subsequently after that.

In July 1976, both Frankley and Strensham were so full, that cars parked on the hard shoulder, but the AA warned drivers not to do this.

In November 1984, it was named as the best Granada service area.

On 2 August 1984, it was visited by Transport Minister, Lynda Chalker.

The 2019 Motorway Services User Survey found that Frankley's southbound side was in the bottom five motorway services in the UK for customer satisfaction.

== Structure ==
It has been updated over the years and fitted with new retail and fast food outlets, but the original building remains intact. It is in Bromsgrove District; it marks the northernmost point of the M5 in Worcestershire; to the north is the Metropolitan Borough of Dudley, and to the north-east is Birmingham. New Frankley is to the south.

== Electric car charging ==
There is one electric car charging point at the northbound services, and one at the southbound services. Both are operated by Gridserve.

Previous: None on M5; Hilton Park on M6; Telford on M54	Motorway service stations on the M5 Motorway	Next: Strensham
