= Dovecot =

Dovecot may refer to:

- Dovecot (software), an email package
- Dovecot, Liverpool, north-west England
- Dovecote (or dovecot), a building for pigeons or doves
- Dovecot Studios, tapestry and arts venue in Edinburgh

== See also ==
- Dovecote (disambiguation)
