= Hail to the Ale, Wolverhampton =

Pub in Wolverhampton, West Midlands, England

Coordinates: 52°36′29″N 2°09′39″W

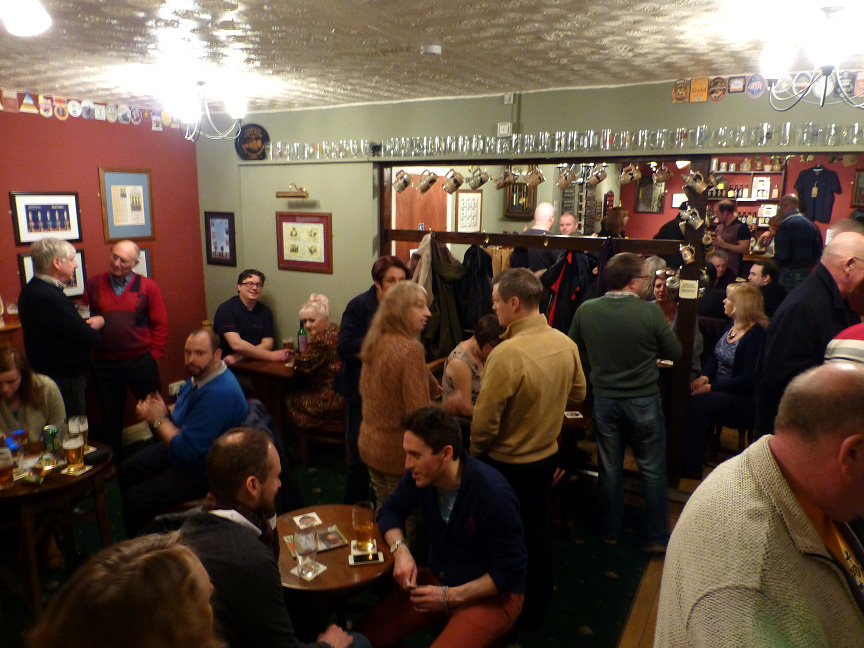
Hail to the Ale micropub, Claregate, Wolverhampton (January 2014)

Hail to the Ale is a micropub at Claregate, Wolverhampton, WV6 9JN.

The pub is owned by Gary and Angela Morton of Morton Brewery, based in nearby Essington, Staffordshire.

The pub was the first micropub to open in the West Midlands, opening on 5 September 2013 in a building that was previously occupied by the former Claregate Post Office and an antiques shop.

Hail to the Ale won the Campaign for Real Ale's Wolverhampton City Pub of the Year for five years in a row in 2015, 2016, 2017, 2018 and 2019, winning again in 2022 and 2024. It was also awarded Campaign for Real Ale's West Midlands Regional Pub of the Year [2015], West Midlands County Pub of the Year awards [2015-2017] and Wolverhampton CAMRA Cider Pub of the Year [2018 & 2024]. The micropub was also named in the Daily Telegraph's Thirsty Thirty pubs list, picked by the writers of the Pint to Pint column in the newspaper's Weekend supplement.

During the COVID-19 pandemic, Hail to the Ale operated a non-profit cash and carry of essential goods for the benefit of the local community.
