= Telford services =

Motorway service station in Shropshire, England

Telford Services
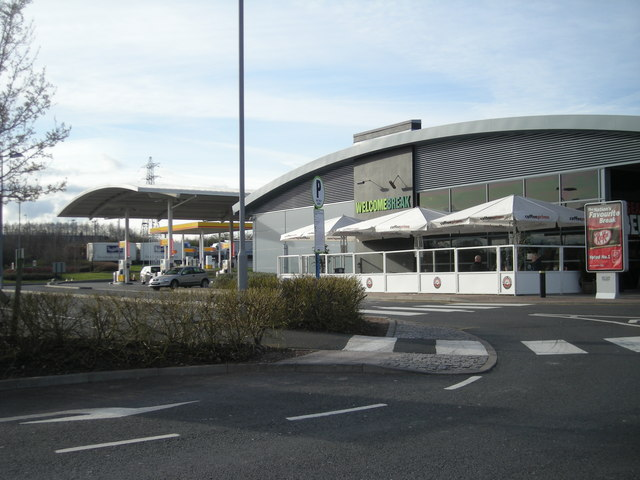
- Telford Services main building

- Location in Shropshire, England Location on the UK motorway network

Information
- County: Shropshire
- Road: M54
- Coordinates: 52.6762°N 2.4008°W
- Operator: Welcome Break
- Date opened: 2004
- Website: www.welcomebreak.co.uk/locations/telford/

Telford services is a motorway service area that was opened on 17 March 2003 off Junction 4 of the M54 motorway, near the town of Telford, Shropshire, England. The services are located just to the east of Stafford Park Industrial Estate, and west of Shifnal.

It is the only service station on the motorway and, if travelling east, the last service station before Corley on the M6 or Frankley on the M5.

Previous: Corley on M6; Frankley on M5	Motorway service stations on the M54 motorway	Next: None
