= Moreton School =

Coordinates: 52.6169°N 2.1078°W

Location
- Old Fallings Lane; Bushbury; Wolverhampton, West Midlands, WV10 8BY; England

Information
- Type: Academy
- Established: 1931 (As Bushbury Hill School)
- Local authority: Wolverhampton City Council
- Trust: Amethyst Academies Trust
- Department for Education URN: 144278 Tables
- Ofsted: Reports
- Headteacher: Scott Williams
- Staff: Metro
- Gender: Mixed
- Age: 11 to 16
- Enrolment: 1000
- Website: https://www.moreton.aatrust.co.uk/

Moreton School is a co-educational secondary school located one mile (1.6 km) north east of Wolverhampton City Centre in the West Midlands of England. The school accommodates over 1000 pupils.

== History ==
It was originally formed as a boys school, Bushbury Hill School, in 1931, but later became co-educational and was renamed Moreton Community School. Previously a community school administered by Wolverhampton City Council, in March 2017 Moreton Community School converted to academy status and was renamed Moreton School. The school is now sponsored by the Amethyst Academies Trust.

Although the school technically has a sixth form provision, in practice all sixth form education within the Amethyst Academies Trust now takes place at Aldersley High School. A new sixth form centre was built at Aldersley High School in 2019.

== Facilities ==
The school's facilities include:

- Dance studio
- Drama studio
- Music recording studios
- Art studios
- 5 D&T labs
- 7 Science labs
- Community Hub
- A theatre, gymnasium, sports hall, tennis courts & large playing fields.
- And a Muga (built in 2023)
