= Aldersley =

Suburb of Wolverhampton, England

Coordinates: 52.607°N 02.154°W

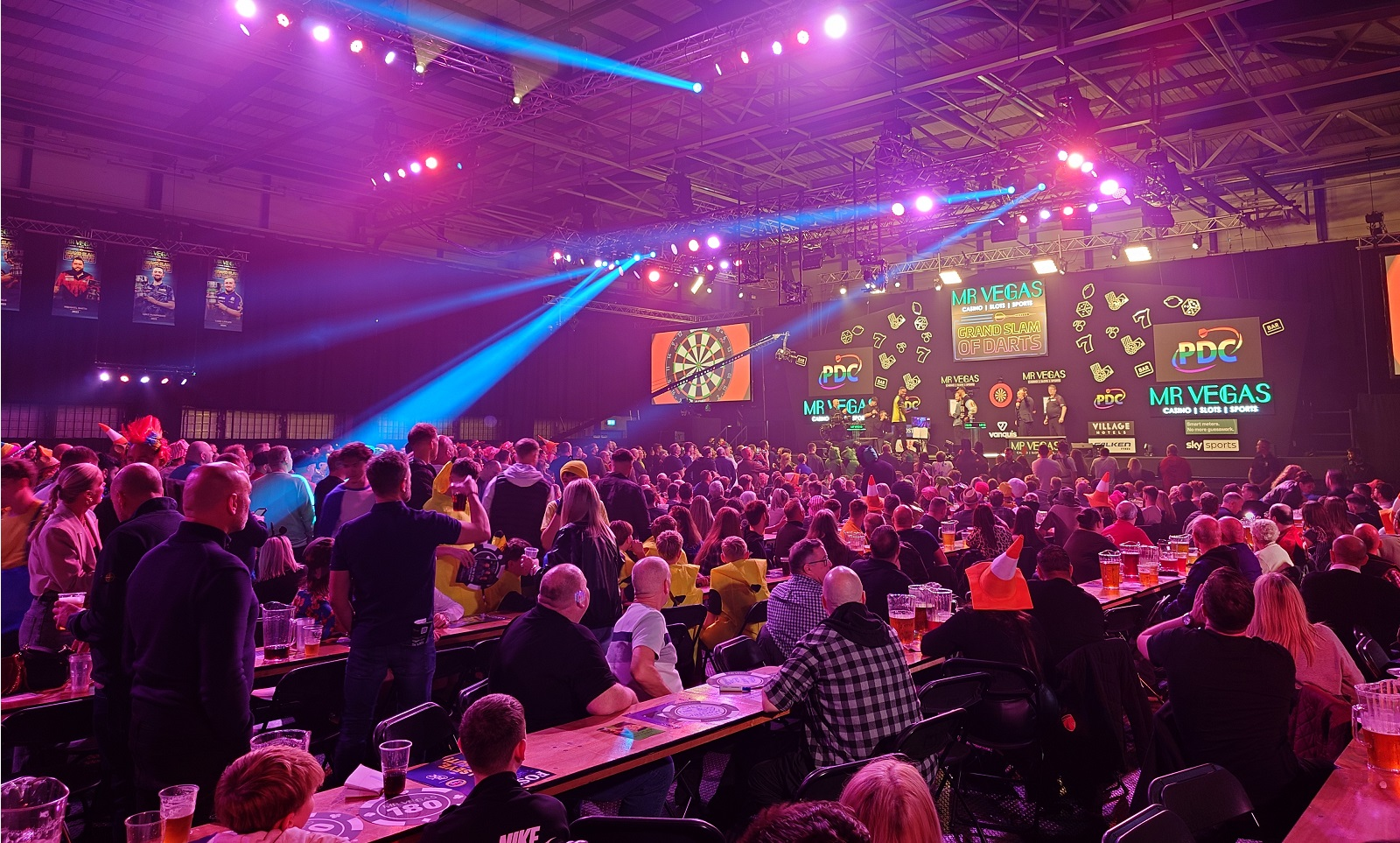
- Grand Slam of Darts 2025 night two, at WV Active Aldersley

- Location within the West Midlands
- Interactive map of Aldersley
- OS grid reference: SJ8901
- Metropolitan borough: Wolverhampton
- Metropolitan county: West Midlands
- Region: West Midlands
- Country: England
- Sovereign state: United Kingdom
- Post town: Wolverhampton
- Postcode district: WV6 9
- Dialling code: 01902
- Police: West Midlands
- Fire: West Midlands
- Ambulance: West Midlands

Aldersley is a suburb of Wolverhampton, West Midlands, England. It is north-west of Wolverhampton city centre, within the Tettenhall Regis ward. Aldersley is a relatively modern part of Wolverhampton, with most of the housing stock – both private and council – dating from after World War II.

The Smestow Valley Leisure Ride starts here and the Staffordshire and Worcestershire Canal passes through the area. WV Active Aldersley, formerly named Aldersley Leisure Village and Aldersley Stadium is home to the Wolverhampton & Bilston Athletics Club, and Wolverhampton Wheelers Cycling Club who use its 450-metre tarmac banked velodrome. The centre has hosted the Professional Darts Corporation Grand Slam of Darts tournament since 2018. (Note: With the exception of 2020.)

== History ==
The name 'Aldersley' is said by toponymists to come from 'Alor' - Old English for Alder as in Alder Tree, and 'lēah' - a woodland clearing, the name likely meaning a clearing in the Alder wood or woodland clearing where there are Alders. On the grounds of Aldersley Leisure Village, many Alder trees grow today, though it is not known if they are descendants of those that gave their name to the place.

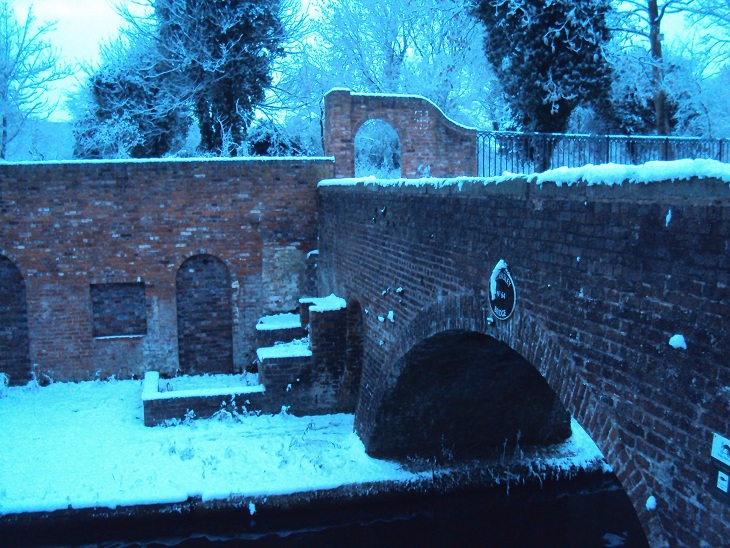
Aldersley bridge & building remains

Historically, Aldersley was a rural area consisting of the odd farm or house in the manor of Tettenhall Clericorum. The hamlet was also known as Autherley. The main thoroughfare of Aldersley Road existed by 1377. The coming of the canals changed things somewhat, with Aldersley the location of a major canal junction - that of the Birmingham Mainline Canal and the Staffordshire & Worcestershire Canal. A small hamlet was built at this junction for the people who operated it - with lock keepers cottages, a tollkeepers house and so on. Today, only the cellars and some brickwork remain of these historic buildings after they were demolished during the 1960s.

Nearby stood Aldersley farm, close to the current driveway into Aldersley stadium on the Aldersley Road, with Blakeley Green House just a quarter of a mile north along the Aldersley Road. The next change to the landscape of the area came with the railways; the Wolverhampton to Shrewsbury Line passing along the northern edge of Aldersley, with the Wombourne Branch Line branching off this south, through Aldersley and onto Tettenhall, and eventually Wombourne and Stourbridge.

During the mid 20th Century, post World War II, extensive housing was built in Aldersley and neighbouring Claregate. Aldersley Stadium was also developed in the 1950s on land that previously belonged to Aldersley Farm. In the late 1990s, the stadium was rebuilt, and renamed Aldersley Leisure Village. It has since been renamed WV Active Aldersley.

== Demography ==
=== Age ===
The 2001 Population Census recorded a total of 4,156 residents in Aldersley. 33.1% of the population was within the 25-44 age band, compared for 28.2% for Wolverhampton as a whole. The 45-59 age band was the second largest at 16.6% and the 5-15 age band was the third largest at 14.3%.

=== Ethnicity and religion ===
Aldersley is a predominantly white neighbourhood with 85.9% of Aldersley being British White, 1.1% Irish and 1.8% Other. This is above the city average of 75.4%, 1.0% and 1.4%, respectively. The Asian population was below that of the city average. 5.7% were identified as being Indian, below the city average of 12.3%; 0.8% are Pakistani, below the city average of 1.2%; and 0.3% were Other compared to the city average of 0.7%. There were no Bangladeshi residents, compared to the city average of 0.1%. The black population was also below that of the city average. Afro-Caribbeans made up a total of 2.4% of the population, compared with the city average of 3.9%. African residents made up 0.2%, compared with the city average of 0.3%. Chinese residents made up a total of 0.2% of the population, below the city average of 0.4%.

Christianity was the predominant religion in Aldersley, with 76.9% of the population stating that they were Christians. The second most dominant religion was Sikhism, with 3.0% of Aldersley being Sikhs, although this is below the city average of 7.6%. 9.3% stated that they had no religion and 7.8% did not state a religion.

=== Households ===
There are a total of 1,750 households in Aldersley. 81.8% of households are owner-occupied, above the city average of 60.5%. 7.5% of properties are council houses, 1.6% were owned housing association-owned and 7% were owned by a private landlord.

10.7% of houses are without central heating and 0.2% are without sole use of a bath or toilet. 3.3% of houses are classed as being overcrowded, below the city average of 6.8%. 23.7% of households have no car, 46.1% have one car and 30.3% have two or more cars.

=== Employment ===
Aldersley has an unemployment rate of 3.8%, below the city average of 5.3%. Although, the percentage of Aldersley who were unemployed but economically active was 5.2%.

== Education ==
=== Primary ===
Claregate Primary School is the principal provider of primary schooling for the Aldersley area.

=== Secondary ===
Aldersley High School is not actually in Aldersley, but is located on the western edge of the neighbouring area of Pendeford.

== Leisure ==
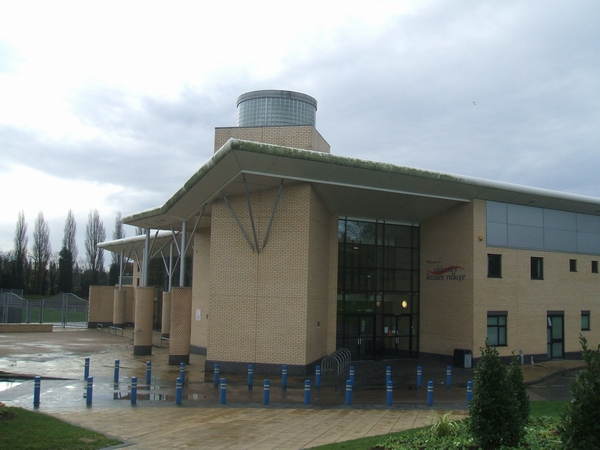
WV Active Aldersley

WV Active Aldersley is a leisure facility wholly owned by City of Wolverhampton Council. It provides training and competition facilities for athletics, cycling and target shooting. Aldersley Stadium, a part of the facility, was built in 1956 and has an athletics track with a banked cycle track around its perimeter. The centre also has astroturf football and hockey pitches, the National Indoor Shooting venue, a sports hall and gym. Wolverhampton Wanderers academy have a 'dome' with an indoor pitch on the grounds. Since 2018 (except for 2020), WV Active Aldersley has hosted the Grand Slam of Darts. It also hosted live comedy shows and other events whilst the Wolverhampton Civic Hall was being refurbished. The Grand Slam of Darts was expected to return to Wolverhampton's Civic Hall in 2023, but has remained at WV Active Aldersley.

Nearby, Claregate Park has tennis courts, a large grass pitch area used for football and cricket, a pavilion with changing facilities and a children's play area.

Public houses in the area include The Pilot on Green Lane, The Claregate on Codsall Road and The Swan Hotel on Lower Street.

A local Brownie unit (1st Aldersley Brownies) is based at the Christ the King Church hall on Pendeford Avenue.

== See also ==
List of areas in Wolverhampton
