= Northicote School =

School in the United Kingdom

- Wolverhampton; England

Information
- School type: Secondary School
- Established: 1951
- Closed: 2019
- Gender: Co-educational
- Age: 11 to 18

Northicote School was a co-educational secondary school located in the city Wolverhampton, West Midlands, England.

== History ==
=== Founding ===
Plans to build the school began in 1948. It was opened as a Secondary Modern School in 1951, in the reign of King George VI. The age range of the school was 11 to 18. It had specialist status in mathematics and computing.

=== Ofsted Inspection ===
It was the first school in Britain to be condemned as "failing" by Ofsted in 1993, but within two years was transformed into a successful school – a remarkable turnaround that saw head teacher Geoff Hampton knighted for his services to education in 1998. Sir Geoff then departed for a professor's role at University of Wolverhampton. The last headteacher of the school was Mr R. Davis.

=== Merger ===
The Northicote School was built as a bilateral school, having both secondary modern and grammar streams during the 1950s to serve the expanding Bushbury area of Wolverhampton, though during the 1970s it converted to a comprehensive school. The school was informed in 2007 that it was being merged with Pendeford Business and Enterprise College to form an academy under controversial plans.

In the academic year 2010–11 the school merged with Pendeford Business and Enterprise College to become the North East Wolverhampton Academy. The combined school was originally located over both former school sites before relocating to a newly constructed and refurbished campus in September 2014 at the former Pendeford Business and Enterprise College site. Northicote Campus was subsequently demolished in 2019 although a few months later contractors working for the council repainted the "School Keep Clear" markings outside the former site. New houses have since been constructed on the land, today they are Blackthorne Drive and Juniper Avenue.
