= Bushbury =

Village in the West Midlands, England

Coordinates: 52.620°N 2.113°W

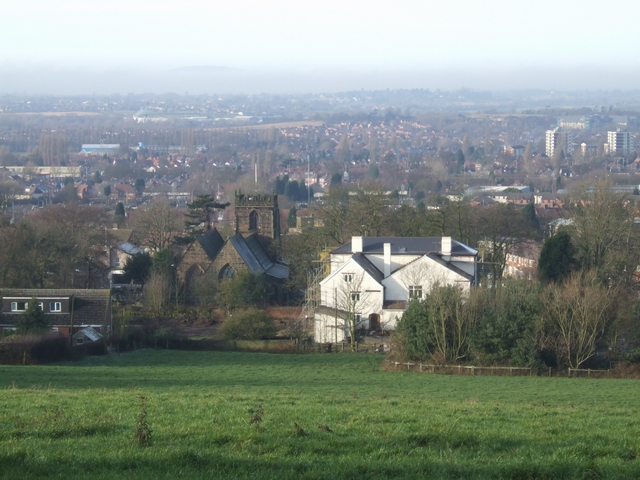
- Bushbury Hall and Church with Wolverhampton in the distance

- Location within the West Midlands
- Population: 2,600 (2011 Census.Wards)
- Metropolitan borough: Wolverhampton
- Metropolitan county: West Midlands
- Region: West Midlands
- Country: England
- Sovereign state: United Kingdom
- Post town: WOLVERHAMPTON
- Postcode district: WV10
- Dialling code: 01902
- Police: West Midlands
- Fire: West Midlands
- Ambulance: West Midlands
- UK Parliament: Wolverhampton North East

Bushbury is a suburban village and ward in the City of Wolverhampton in the West Midlands, England. It lies two miles (3.2 km) north-east of Wolverhampton city centre, divided between the Bushbury North and Bushbury South and Low Hill wards. Bushbury also lies near to the villages of Coven, Featherstone and Four Ashes which are in South Staffordshire.

Bushbury is a mixed area of private and council owned houses, built since the 1920s, and lies in the shadow and on the slope of Bushbury Hill.

== History ==
Bushbury was recorded in the Domesday Book of 1086 as 'Biscopsberie'. Toponymists believe that the name comes from the Old English 'biscop' (bishop) and 'burh' (fortification), so Bushbury possibly means 'Bishops fortification'.

St. Mary's Church lies on Bushbury Lane. In the chancel of the church can be found the 'Founders Arch', this is actually the tomb of Sir Hugh de Byshbury who is reputed to have built the church (chancel) in the 15th century. Just beyond the south door in the churchyard is the base of a preaching cross, believed to date to the 10th or 11th century having been placed by the Earl of Mercia. Other buildings of historical significance include the 17th century Northycote Farm on Underhill Lane.

The area, along with a wide tract of Mercia, was assigned by William the Conqueror to Ansculf de Picquigny, who built a motte and bailey fortress at Dudley. By 1087, the time of Domesday Book, the area belonged to Ansculf's son, William Fitzansculph. He had installed in Bushbury a tenant called Robert, who also held lands from him in Penn, Ettingshall, Moseley and Oxley.

In medieval times, Bushbury was divided into several manors, each with a manor house - Bushbury, Essington, Moseley, Elston, Showell (Seawall or Sewell from an earlier unrecorded Old English name - likely Seofan Wealles meaning 'Seven Wells'), Oxley, Wobaston (Wybaston - from an early unrecorded Old English name - likely Wigbeald's tun).

Into the early 19th century, Bushbury was very rural, with a population of just 488 in 1801, but this was to change with the coming of the railways and increasing industry in the 19th century, with large housing estates transforming the area completely from the 1920s onwards.

Following the First World War, a number of aircraft manufacturers set up or relocated plants from the south of the country to take advantage of the labour supply, and this, coupled with the opening of the Goodyear tyre plant, significantly industrialised the area.

In 1927, the Goodyear Tyre and Rubber Company opened its Bushbury plant. Twelve years later, it was employing 1700, many of which were Bushbury men. Previous to this, many of Bushbury's population was employed at either the Electric Construction Company, or one of the railway companies operating nearby in the Gorsebrook area. The remaining remnant of the ECC is the sports and social club on Showell Road.

The Stafford Road was only made into a dual carriageway during the 1930s, and this saw much of the terraced and older housing on the left hand side as you travel from Wolverhampton towards Stafford, demolished to make way for the road. However a short section of Stafford Road was single carriageway between Bushbury Lane and Five Ways Island. This gap was rebuilt as dual carriageway in the late 1980s.

The industry led to rapid housebuilding in the 1930s, and also made the area a significant target for German bombers in the Second World War. A combination of good fortune and foresight led to a major German bombing raid, shortly after the blitz in Coventry, to be cancelled.

After the end of World War II in 1945, Wolverhampton council erected 400 prefabricated bungalows across the city, and built its first permanent postwar houses at the Underhill Estate near Bushbury in the late 1940s.

The large Bushbury Cemetery/Crematorium is in Underhill Lane. The cemetery was opened in 1949 with 40 acres (16 ha), with planning permission for extension sought in 2012. The crematorium, with two chapels, east and west, designed by local architect Richard Twentyman, was opened in 1954.

Schools in the area include Moreton School. The Northicote School was formerly located in this area, where previous headteacher Geoff Hampton received a Knighthood in 1998 in recognition of his services to the improvement of the school and his services to education.

In 2008, the iconic blue and yellow Goodyear chimney was demolished, as part of wider work to clear a section of the Goodyear site, which is to make way for a new housing estate. It was reported that around 1000 people attended the demolition. However the factory clock tower is expected to be retained as part of the redevelopment.

== Geography ==
Bushbury lies approximately two miles north of Wolverhampton City Centre. Despite the heavy industrialisation of the area, Bushbury remains a gateway to the Staffordshire countryside. While one end of the suburb is dominated by the former Goodyear plant and surrounding factories, the other end contains areas of greenery in Northwood Park, and playing fields adjacent to Bee Lane. Beeches Farm still operates at the rear of St. Mary's Church.

== Leisure Facilities ==
There was a former AMF bowling alley in Bushbury, called Strykers. During the 1990s, it was home to a Quasar laser arena and a SEGA World arcade. In October 2013, Strykers closed its doors in 'mysterious circumstances', according to local newspaper, the Express & Star.

Following the closure, local rumours suggested the bowling alley had closed permanently, closed temporarily for redecoration or was closed in the short term while the owners decided what to do. Enquiries made by the Express & Star revealed no response from the owner, Garland Leisure Limited, suggesting that nobody really had a clue what was going on. Garland Leisure Limited issued a notice to Companies House which entered the company into insolvency on 5 November 2013, giving a better indication of the future for the company.

On 23 December 2013, a fire started in the empty Strykers building, a blaze which took around 100 firefighters to control and all but destroyed the building. Bulldozers were quickly brought to the scene to flatten the remainder. According to the Express & Star, the owner was said to be 'devastated' and 'didn't know what to do' with the remaining large strip of land, which is located at the end of a residential street, directly opposite the newly constructed KFC fast food restaurant.

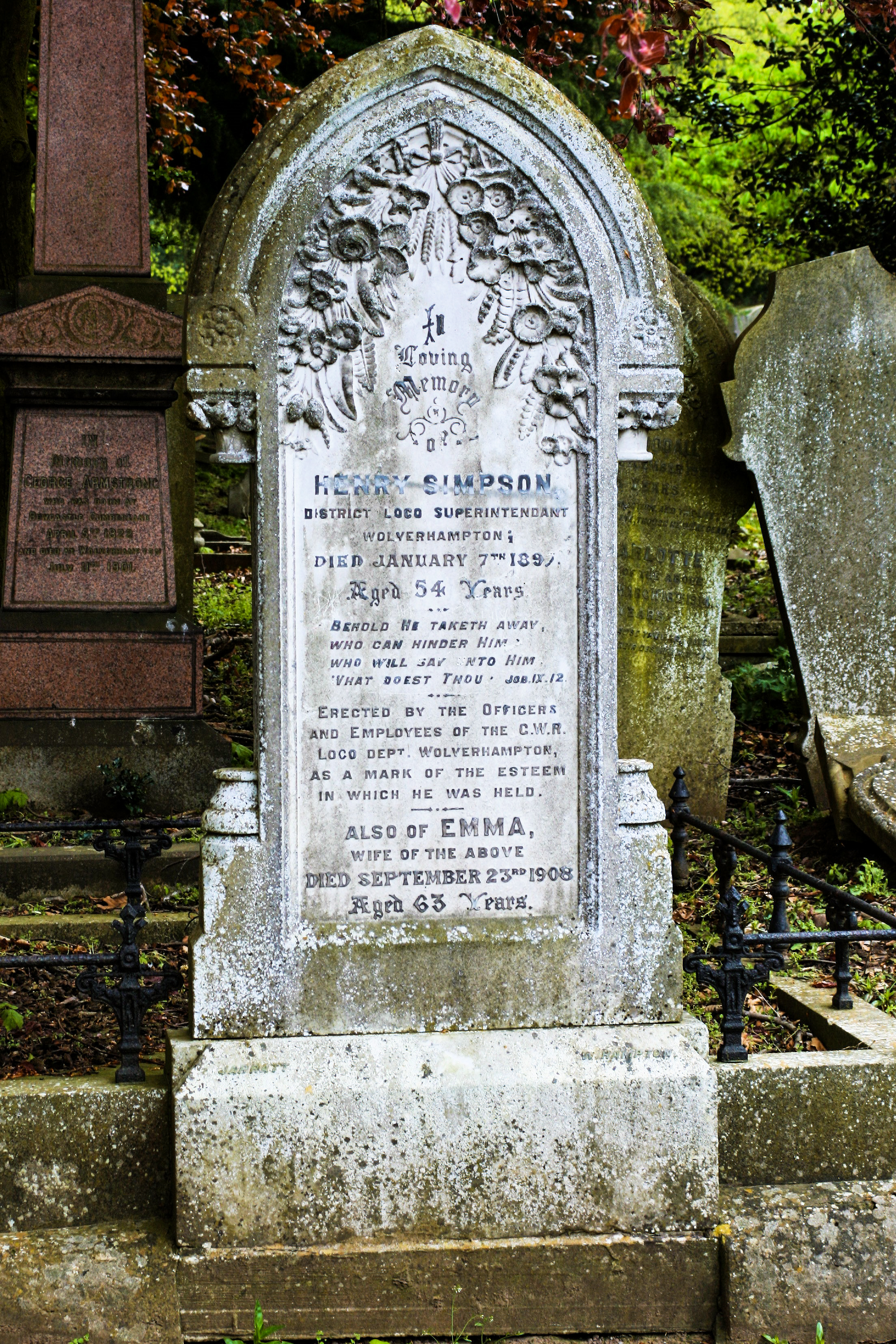
The graves of George Armstrong (behind, to left) and Henry Simpson (foreground), Loco Superintendents

== Transport ==
Bushbury steam locomotive depot accommodated London, Midland and Scottish Railway and British Railways London Midland Region locomotives, until its closure in 1966, at the spot that Bushbury Lane crosses the railway line to Stafford. Two Loco Superintendents of the Wolverhampton sheds are buried near to each other in St. Mary's churchyard. One is George Armstrong the other is Henry Simpson.

Following the closure of Bushbury's suburban rail station, buses provide public transport in and around the area. National Express West Midlands Routes 2, 25, 32, and 33 serve the Bushbury area. Diamond Bus service 65 skirts the northern fringe of Bushbury serving Wednesfield, Northicote Farm and Bushbury Crematorium. This hourly Mon-Sat service also provides a link to New Cross Hospital without requiring a change of bus. Select Bus service 67 operates three times daily Mon-Fri between Wolverhampton and Cannock.

== Public houses ==
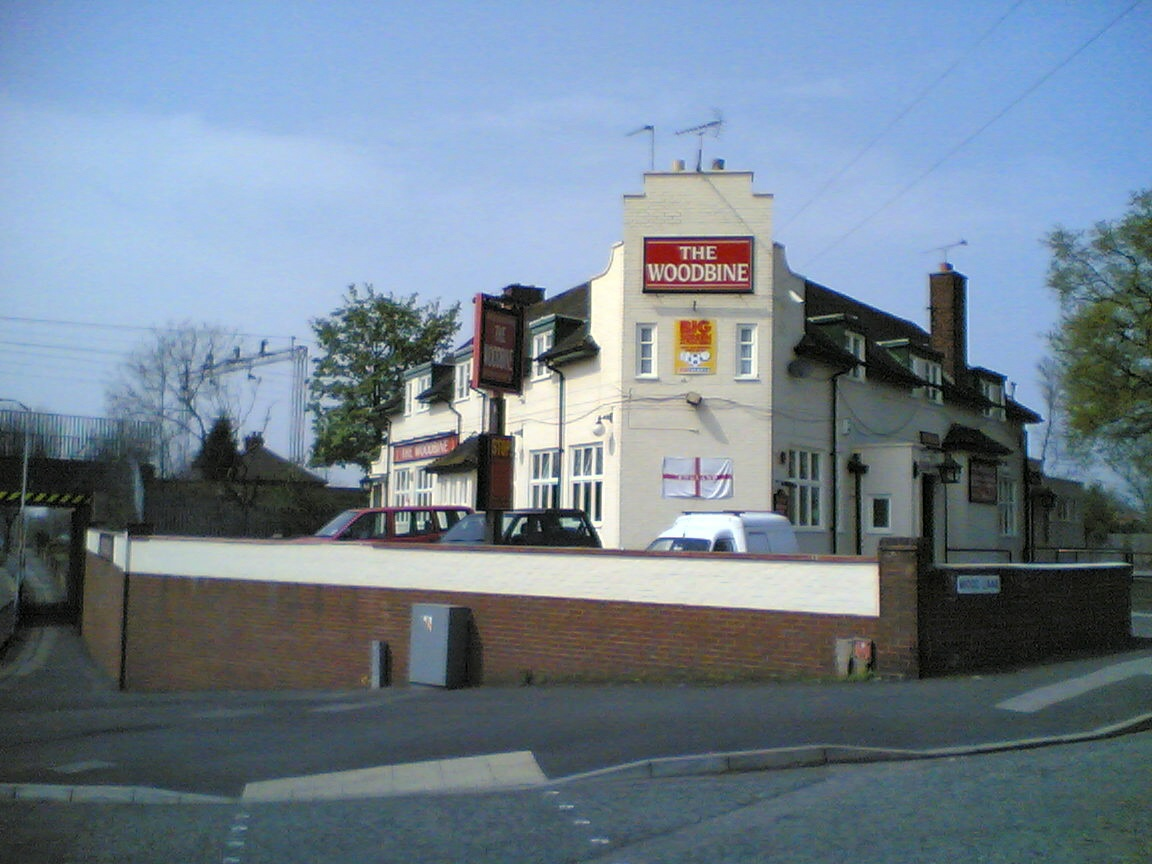
The Woodbine, Bushbury

Today, Bushbury has no pubs and 1 club.

On the corner of Elston Hall Lane and Wood Lane was The Woodbine, which spent time under the name the 'Red Rooster' in the early 2000s before reverting to The Woodbine - this is now closed and boarded up. On Northwood Park estate was a newer Banks's pub, the King Charles - this has now been demolished. On Bushbury Lane, close to its Stafford Road junction - though not strictly a 'pub' in the traditional sense is the Bushbury Working Mens Club - as above this is now a KFC. Despite the Electric Construction Company closing in September 1985, there is still a club bearing its name on Showell Road, the ECC Sports & Social Club. Gone is the Oxley Arms, previously on Bushbury Lane, it was demolished during the 1990s. Other closed pubs included Butler's Arms which stood on the corner of Kempthorne Avenue and Bushbury Lane. Although long since replaced by a (formerly Co-op supermarket) B&M Store, the former pub stone signpost was retained by the developers.
