= Goodyear chimney =

Structure in Wolverhampton, England

Coordinates: 52.6102°N 2.1268°W

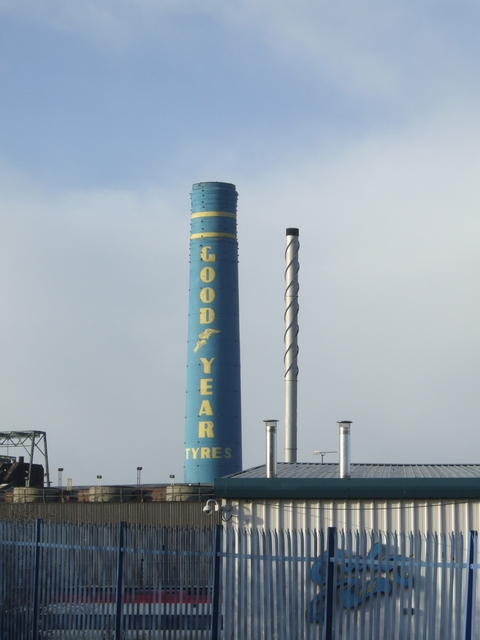
The chimney prior to its demolition

The Goodyear chimney was a landmark on the Goodyear factory on Stafford Road, Wolverhampton, England. It was 200 feet (60 m) high and weighed 3,000 long tons (3,000 t; 3,400 short tons).

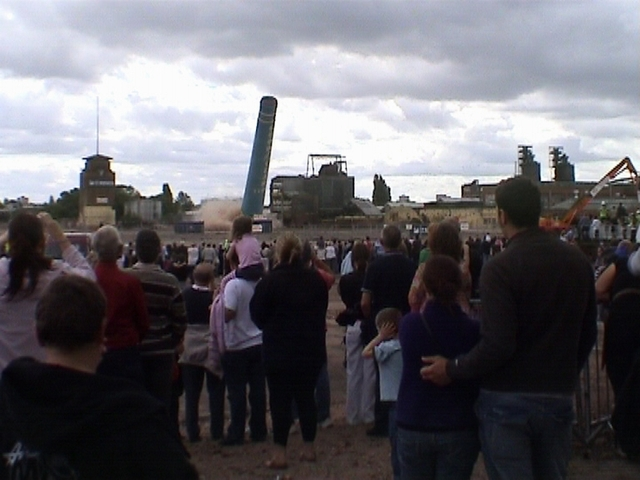
Demolition of the chimney in 2008

Work started on building the chimney in October 1927, with the mayor of Wolverhampton laying the first brick. In 2008 the factory and chimney were demolished. An Oxley primary school pupil and a former Goodyear worker had the privilege of pressing the firing button.
