= Corley services =

Motorway service station in Warwickshire, England

Corley Services
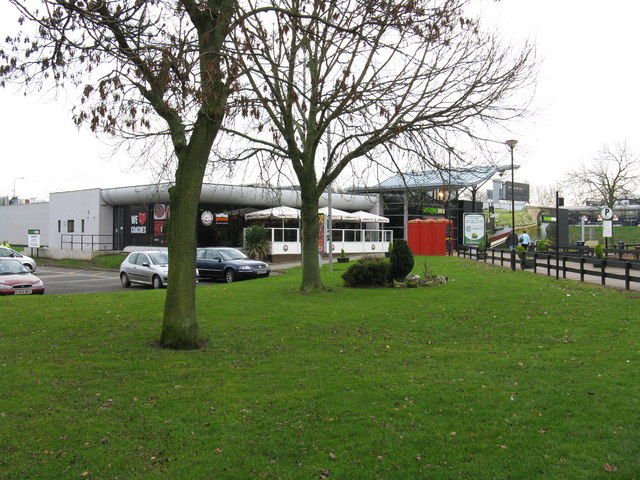
- Corley services

- Location in Warwickshire, England Location on the UK motorway network

Information
- County: Warwickshire
- Road: M6
- Coordinates: 52.4722°N 1.5480°W
- Operator: Welcome Break
- Date opened: 17 January 1972
- Website: www.welcomebreak.co.uk/locations/corley/

Corley services is a motorway service station between junctions 3 and 3A of the M6 motorway in the county of Warwickshire, England. It is close to the village of Corley, with the nearest city being Coventry several miles to the south, with Birmingham being situated slightly further to the west. A footbridge, made of concrete but now clad in green fibreglass panelling, spans the motorway to link services on both sides.

== History ==
=== Construction ===
At Corley Moor, a service area was proposed on in 1968 on a 36-acre (15 ha) site.

Forte was awarded the £500,000 contract in May 1969, to open in late 1971.

It is situated on the Ansty to Coleshill section of the M6, which opened on 1 July 1971. The site would have room for 400 cars, 150 lorries, and 24 coaches. The architect was Garnett Clough Blakemore Associates; Patrick Garnett, Tony Cloughley and Erik Blakemore.

The northbound side opened on 17 January 1972 (six months after the section of motorway it serves) and was originally operated by Forte. The southbound side would open possibly by late March 1972, when the M6 was fully open.

There was mining subsidence from Coventry Colliery in May 1975, which closed the northbound site. In February 1975, Forte tried to stop the National Coal Board from mining near the service area, but could not. The northbound side reopened in late 1978.

In 1979, Forte opened their first 'Julie's Pantry' at the site. In May 1980, when run as a 'Motor Chef', it was named in the top three UK service areas.

=== Operation ===
It is currently operated by Welcome Break and receives approximately 2 million visitors per year. It had changed to Welcome Break in May 1988.

In early August 1983, Forte negotiated a deal with National Express Coaches for its London-Birmingham Rapide service to have a staging post at the service area, with a park-and-ride service into Coventry. The service began from late September 1983.

The Midlands Today hosted a Children in Need event at Corley in November 1984.

In the late 1980s, the company National Holidays also operated a staging post at the service area, for switching regional coaches. It was not just coach services that operated staging posts at the service area; drugs routes passed through the service area as well. West Midlands Police seized £1 million of heroin at the service area in November 1995.

It was the UK's second-busiest motorway services in 2003, with two million customers a year.

In December 2003, Corley gained a permanent Police Community Support Officer, jointly funded by Welcome Break and Warwickshire Police.

=== Incidents ===
On 4 May 1974 Liverpool football fans, travelling south to the 1974 FA Cup final, wrecked the gaming machines at the service area. Twenty-three Liverpool fans were arrested in August 1977, after stealing cans of drink from the cafeteria, in the early hours of the morning, being held at Nuneaton police station.

In December 1977, all football coaches were banned from all Motor Chef service areas. Football fans had vandalised service areas and ransacked retail outlets, and Forte decided that this could go on no more; it would safeguard everyone else.

On the evening of 16 November 1981, in a police operation against IRA bombings in London, a van at the service area was found to have gelignite. The driver was taken to Bedworth police station.

Next southbound: Rugby; Watford Gap on M1	Motorway service stations on the M6 motorway	Next northbound: Hilton Park; Norton Canes (M6 Toll); Telford (M54)
