= I54 =

South Staffordshire business park

Coordinates: 52.6326°N 2.1374°W

i54 South Staffordshire
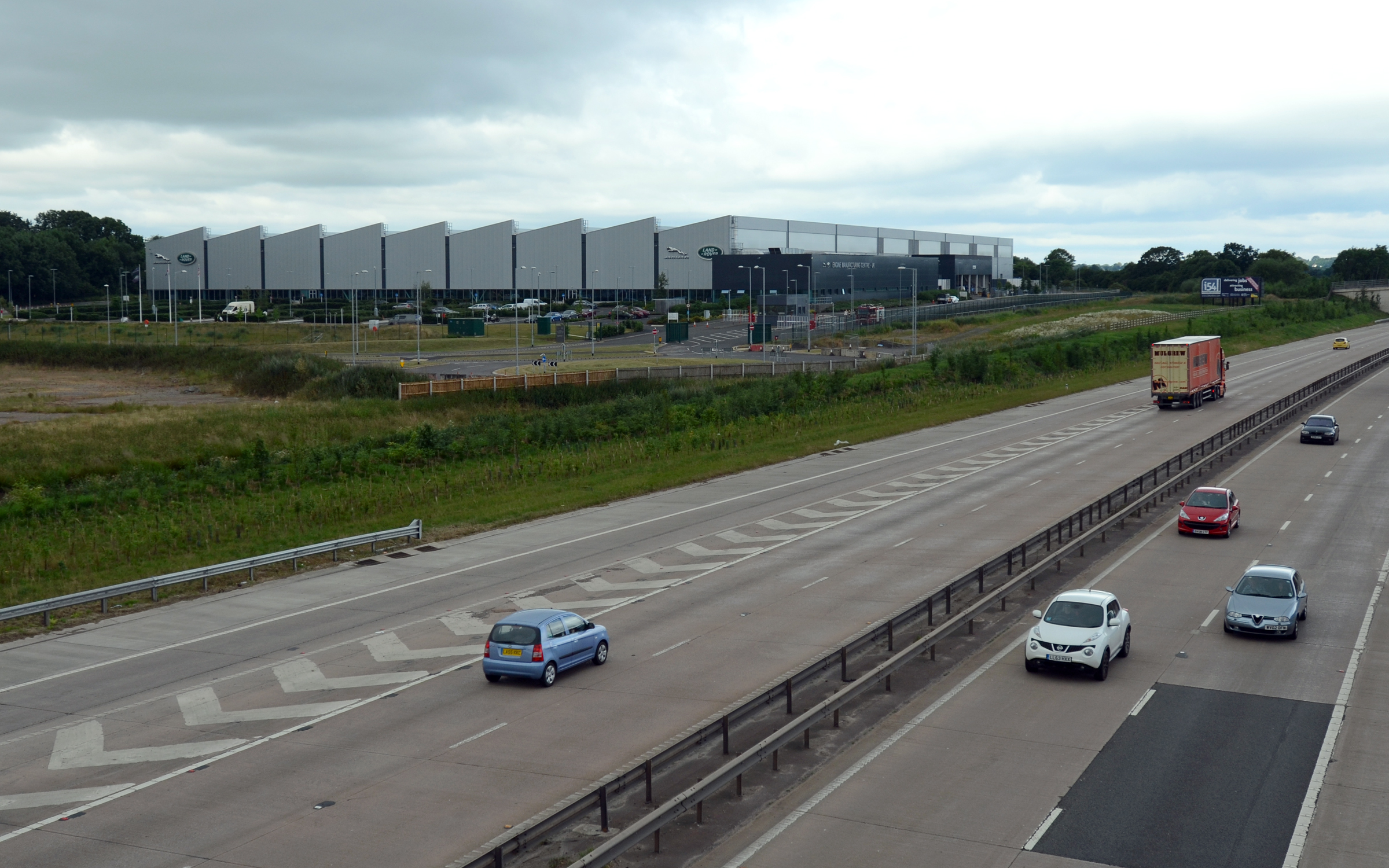
- The i54 plant with the M54 motorway in the foreground. This is at Junction 2 of the motorway looking south west.
- Type: Not Classified
- Industry: Manufacturing, Offices, Research, Hotels, IT and Technology
- Founded: 2005
- Founder: Advantage West Midlands, Staffordshire County Council, City of Wolverhampton Council
- Headquarters: South Staffordshire, England
- Website: i54 Official Website

i54 South Staffordshire is a 98-hectare (240-acre) UK technology-based business park located at Junction 2 on the M54 Motorway in the West Midlands, on the boundary of South Staffordshire and Wolverhampton.

i54 South Staffordshire is a £50 million joint venture partnership between Staffordshire County Council, City of Wolverhampton Council and South Staffordshire Council. It falls within the Black Country Enterprise Zone.

The site entrance is at Junction 2 of the M54 Motorway, to the west of the Staffordshire and Worcestershire Canal. The site is home to several manufacturing companies including MOOG Aerospace, Eurofins Laboratories, International Security Printers (ISP), and the home of the £500 million UK advance engine manufacturing facility of Jaguar Land Rover.

== Project costs and details ==
The cost of the project to the 98-hectare (240-acre) site is estimated to be £67 million GBP and was granted crucial planning approvals from two local authorities in September 2006.

In August 2006, contractors to the site started the second major phase of the scheme, a £5 million GBP 12-month programme of infrastructure and reclamation work.

On 3 July 2007, key partners for the project toasted the substantial completion of a £10 million GBP programme of remediation and site preparation works on the i54 site. The site preparation work ran over a 16-month period and has been carried out by Blackwell and supervised by Mouchel Parkman engineering consultancy. During this time, the following was achieved:

- Produced level development plots
- Installation of primary infrastructure including a spine road
- Drainage Systems
- Site fencing
- Creation of new wetlands and ecological habitats

Other statistics include:

- 152,000 square metres (1,640,000 sq ft) of topsoil has been excavated but retained on site.
- 190,000 square metres (2,000,000 sq ft) of sub-soil and rock excavated and reused on site.
- 1 kilometre (0.62 mi) spine road constructed
- 4.5 kilometres (2.8 mi) of fencing erected (3 kilometres (1.9 mi) still to be erected)
- Total of 6,500 cubic metres (230,000 cu ft) of ponds and swales created as part of the landscaping

== Jaguar Land Rover ==
On 25 April 2011, Jaguar Land Rover expressed an interest in the i54 site as a possible location for a new advanced engine plant. On 19 September 2011 the then Deputy Prime Minister Nick Clegg announced at the engine factory in Solihull the proposals for Jaguar Land Rover's decision to build their new engine plant in South Staffordshire creating around 1400 additional jobs within the company and more within the supply chain which will be created by a £500 million investment by Jaguar Land Rover and £10m by the Government. The new plant in Wolverhampton would join other Midlands-based plants in Solihull and Castle Bromwich, as well as the birthplace of the new Evoque in Halewood, Liverpool.

It is understood that Jaguar Land Rover is taking on the investments to meet the demands of high sales in Asia. The new engine plant will be home to the new family of 4-cylinder petrol and diesel engines for the luxury Land Rover brand, originally brought to help boost technology in Tata Motors vehicle range. JLR chief executive Dr Ralf Speth announced that £1.5 billion is to be invested into the company and the new engine plant each year for the next 5 years on product development and the engine range. JLR engines are currently being supplied by Ford Motors

== Usage potential ==
- Around 2,000,000 square feet (186,000 m^{2}) of industrial space
- 376,000 square feet (34,900 m^{2}) of commercial/retail and leisure.

== Construction ==
Construction started on site in 2011, with MOOG fully operational on site by the start of 2012. The Aerospace company makes flight controls and spent £15 million to move from its current location, to the i54 South Staffordshire development. The company hopes to safeguard 400 jobs with its relocation. Laboratory firm Eurofins also moved into the development and was fully operational by 2012.

On the 16 January 2019, permission was granted for a 60 acre expansion to the i54 Business Park to the west of the existing park towards Pendeford Hall Lane. The new extension will also be accessible from the M54 Junction 2. This new link road was allocated the number A4510 upon completion.

== Enterprise zone ==
The i54 South Staffordshire site is the largest of the 19 sites which make up the Black Country Enterprise Zone, which has 5 sites in Wolverhampton and 14 in Darlaston, Walsall. The creation of the zone for the Black Country was announced on 23 March 2011 by Chancellor George Osborne. Enterprise zone status speeds up the process of allowing companies to re-locate to the site and encourages it with tax breaks.

== Companies at i54 South Staffordshire ==
- MOOG (2011)
- Eurofins (2011)
- Jaguar Land Rover (2014)
- International Security Printers (ISP) (2014)
- ERA (Home Security Company) (2018)
- Atlas Copco (2018)
- Access 360 (Profab) (2023)
- Victoria + Albert Baths Limited (2023)
