= Carver Wolverhampton City Marathon =

Annual marathon in England

The Carver Wolverhampton Marathon is an annual marathon that is part of a series of events which constitute the Carver Marathon City Marathon Events. The other events occurring at the same time as the marathon include the Carver Wolverhampton Half Marathon, Banks's Run, Children's Run and a cycling event. The marathon is held in Wolverhampton, England, in September each year. The main purpose of these events is to raise money for charity.

The marathon was first organized in 1998 by the late Roy Carver and Ian Savage, then Carver's Groups Sales Director.

The six categories cater to different participants. They are the Marathon (42.195 km), Half Marathon (21.097 km), Banks's Run (10 km), Cycling Event ( 20 km ), and the Children's Run. All events start and finish on Park Road West. The route consists of closed roads, open roads, paths and cycleways, and controlled roads. An estimated 2,300 people participated in 2014. The event organizer is Neil Kendrick.

In 2018 the full Marathon was not run due to a lack of participants.

== Past Results ==
=== Marathon ===
Edition	Year	Date	Time (h:m:s)	Men's winner	Time (h:m:s)	Women's winner
	2018	No Event				
20	2017	3 Sep	2:53:36	Mark Ince	3:09:02	Lauren Draper
19	2016	4 Sep	2:50:32	Kristian Morgan	3:27:17	Rachael Green
18	2015	6 Sep	2:47:19	Mark Carwardine	3:12:33	Rachael Green
17	2014	7 Sep	2:40:27	Mike Flatley	3:15:17	Carole Penlington
16	2013	1 Sep	2:42:02	Peter Stockdale	3:11:09	Deborah Thomas
15	2012	2 Sep	2:55:07	James Murray	3:25:16	Helen James
14	2011	4 Sep	2:41:36	Dominic Croft	3:06:39	Natalie De Villiers
13	2010	5 Sep	2:35:07	Matt Giles	3:32:53	Frances Cooke
12	2009	6 Sep	2:43:21	John Trelfa	3:11:13	Dawn Broom
11	2008	7 Sep	2:40:01	Colin Gell	2:59:41	Julia Matheson
10	2007	2 Sep	2:38:55	Philip Hails	3:01:44	Julia Matheson
9	2006	3 Sep	2:39:42	Shaun Milford	3:15:51	Lisa Barry
8	2005	4 Sep	2:46:41	Adri Hartveld	3:15:07	Ruth Watchorn-Rice
7	2004	5 Sep	2:41:20	Paul Rogers	3:24:20	Alayne Malkin
6	2003	7 Sep	2:34:32	Dennis Walmsley	3:01:59	Andrea Dennison

=== Half Marathon ===
Edition	Year	Date	Time (h:m:s)	Men's winner	Time (h:m:s)	Women's winner
	2019	1 Sep	1:11:01	Jack Pickett	1:33:00	Claire Hotchkiss
	2018	2 Sep	1:15:28	Dean Bate	1:33:47	Helen Tromans
	2017	3 Sep	1:18:13	Daniel Turner	1:31:27	Helen Tromans
	2016	4 Sep	1:13:13	Martin Williams	1:26:53	Lauren Draper
	2015	6 Sep	1:11:04	Martin Williams	1:28:39	Lynne Hill
	2014	7 Sep	1:11:00	Ian McBride	1:28:53	Audrey Wilson
	2013	1 Sep	1:09:07	Ian McBride	1:27:56	Audrey Wilson
	2012	2 Sep	1:15:47	John Wadelin	1:28:46	Audrey Wilson
	2011	4 Sep	1:09:09	Ross Jones	1:19:18	Debra Mason
	2010	5 Sep	1:11:20	Ross Jones	1:24:09	Sue Street-Hall
	2009	6 Sep	1:14:23	Robin Sedman-Smith	1:24:00	Adela Salt
	2008	7 Sep	1:10:15	Matt Blunden	1:23:01	Stephanie Lane
	2007	2 Sep	1:13:04	Mike Cornes	1:18:16	Kim Fawke
	2006	3 Sep	1:11:11	Mark Dalkins	1:20:14	Kim Fawke
	2005	4 Sep	1:14:08	Mark Hall	1:30:50	Patricia Matheson
	2004	5 Sep	1:14:56	Mark Farnell	1:31:39	Lorraine Hardy

== Charity ==
The Carver Wolverhampton City Marathon focuses mainly on supporting local charities. In total since 1998 the marathon events have raised in excess of £300.000. Charities supported in the last 4 years include:

Year	Charities
2011	The Haven Wolverhampton, The Birch Thompson Memorial Fund, Wolverhampton Fostercare Association, The Steve Bull Foundation, The Mayoral Charity Fund.
2012	Wolves Community Trust, St John Ambulance, Penn Hall School, The Mayoral Charities.
2013	Midland Air Ambulance, Compton Hospice, Sunnyside Kennels, The Mayoral Charities.
2014	The planning Committee made the decision to adopt a Charity Partner and that is Compton Hospice. The other Charities who will benefit from a share of the proceeds are: West Park Stroke Cycling Group, Broadmeadow Special School, The Mayoral Charities.

The Carver Wolverhampton City Marathon is a registered charity.
