= Hilton Park services =

Motorway service station in Staffordshire, England

Hilton Park Services
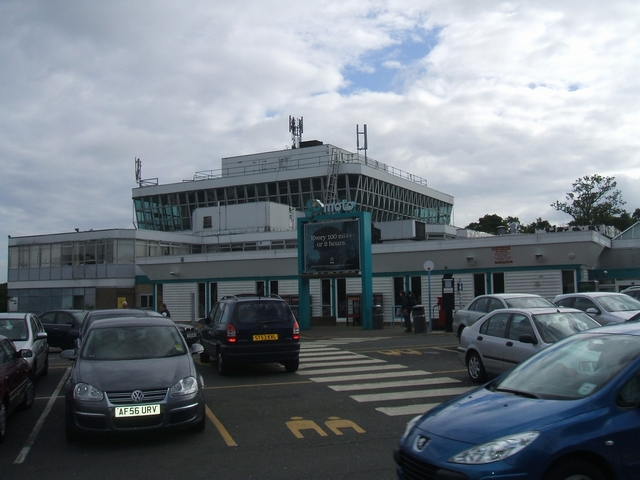
- The main northbound building, with the tower.

- Location in Staffordshire, England Location on the UK motorway network

Information
- County: Staffordshire
- Road: M6
- Coordinates: 52.6427°N 2.0591°W
- Operator: Moto Hospitality
- Date opened: 1970
- Website: moto-way.com/services/hilton-park-northbound/

Hilton Park services is a motorway service station, between junctions 10a and 11 of the M6 motorway in Staffordshire, England. The nearest city is Wolverhampton.

== History ==
Hilton Park opened in 1970 operated by Top Rank, and is now operated by Moto. In 1998, it was reported to be the busiest service station on the UK motorway network. Since the opening of the M6 Toll in 2003, which bypasses Hilton Park and diverts traffic north of Birmingham in the direction of Coventry, the amount of trade has dropped and its size has been reduced.

In 1999 the station was refurbished at a cost of £2.1 million.

There is also a National Highways traffic officer outstation at the entrance of the southbound site, for which planning permission was granted in January 2004.

Next southbound: Corley	Motorway service stations on the M6 motorway	Next northbound: Stafford
