= Dovecotes, Wolverhampton =

Housing estate in Wolverhampton, England

Coordinates: 52.61731°N 2.15741°W

Dovecotes
- Location within the West Midlands
- OS grid reference: SJ894021
  - London: 146.00
- Metropolitan borough: Wolverhampton
- Metropolitan county: West Midlands
- Region: West Midlands
- Country: England
- Sovereign state: United Kingdom
- Post town: WOLVERHAMPTON
- Postcode district: WV8
- Dialling code: 01902
- Police: West Midlands
- Fire: West Midlands
- Ambulance: West Midlands
- UK Parliament: Wolverhampton North East

Dovecotes is a housing estate at Pendeford, Wolverhampton, West Midlands, England. It is situated NNW of the city centre and neighbours Pendeford Park which is adjacent to the border with Staffordshire, within the Oxley ward of Wolverhampton City Council.

== Place name and history ==
The Dovecotes housing estate, situated along Ryefield off Barnhurst Lane and The Droveway, has only existed since the late 1970s, being built on land previously belonging to Barnhurst farm. The place name is listed historically as 'Barnhurst', with the earliest reference to it as Barinhurst (1250), from old English 'bere-ærn' (barn) and 'hyrst' (wooded hill). The canons of Tettenhall held an estate here in the late 13th century. A moated farm complete with dovecote and ponds existed in the area of the present day church. Wolverhampton Corporation bought the Barnhurst estate in 1867, developing part of the area as a sewerage farm by 1870. The farm was demolished and replaced in 1963. The brick gatehouse, built in 1602 was demolished in 1961. Barnhurst farm was operated by Wolverhampton Corporation until 1975, with the housing estate coming a short while later.

== Today ==
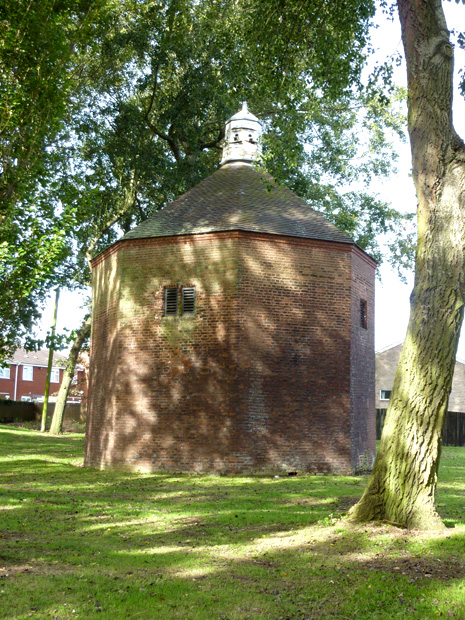
The 17th-century Dovecote, from which the area takes its name

The housing estate was given the name Dovecotes, after the old farm Dovecote that is still standing, and was restored in 2004. The Dovecote pub stood on the site of the farmhouse, though this closed in the 2000s and is now a Seventh Day Adventist church.

Schooling is provided by Dovecotes Nursery, Infants and Junior Schools situated in a central position on the estate.

The council housing on Dovecotes Estate is currently being managed by a Tenants Management Organisation (TMO).

=== Shopping and Amenities ===
There is a small shopping parade within Dovecotes known as The Haymarket, which includes a Premier Store named Pendeford Superstore (previously Spar), an Indian take away, a fish & chip shop, and a poultry business. There was once a newsagent and bookmaker, but these have long closed.
