= Mander (surname) =

Mander is an English occupational surname meaning "basket maker" Middle English. Notable people with the surname include:

== Mander family ==
- Mander family, a prominent family in the Midland counties of England:
  - Charles Tertius Mander (1852–1929), industrialist, philanthropist and public servant
  - Charles Arthur Mander (1884–1951), public servant, philanthropist and manufacturer, son of the above
  - Charles Marcus Mander, 3rd Baronet (1921–2006), industrialist, property developer, landowner and farmer; son of the above
  - Francis Mander (1849–1942), New Zealand politician
  - Geoffrey Mander (1882–1962), industrialist, art collector and politician
  - Jane Mander (1877–1949), New Zealand novelist and journalist; daughter of Francis Mander
  - John Mander (1932–1978), poet, political commentator and cultural critic
  - Miles Mander (1888–1946), English character actor, film director and producer, playwright and novelist
  - Nicholas Mander, 4th Baronet (born 1950), son of Charles Marcus Mander

== Others ==
- Damien Mander (born 1979), Royal Australian Navy diver and sniper turned anti-poaching crusader
- Francesco Mander (1915–2004), Italian conductor and composer
- Frederick Mander (1883–1964), British headmaster, trade unionist and General Secretary of the National Union of Teachers
- Graham Mander (1931–2021), New Zealand yachtsman
- Jasmine Mander (born 1995), Canadian soccer coach and former player
- Jerry Mander (1936–2023), American activist and author
- Lii Tedre (born 1944), née Mander, Estonian actress
- Karel van Mander (1548–1606), Flemish-born Dutch painter, poet and biographer
- Karel van Mander the Younger (1579–1623), Dutch painter, son of the above
- Karel van Mander III (1609–1670), Dutch painter, son of the above
- Lew Mander (1939–2020), New Zealand organic chemist
- Noel Mander (1912–2005), British organ builder and founder of the firm Mander Organs
- Peter Mander (1928–1998), New Zealand yachtsman and 1956 Olympic gold medalist
- Raymond Mander (1911–1983), English theatre actor and historian
- Richard Yates Mander (1862–1917), English organist and composer
- Roger Mander (died 1704), English academic administrator at the University of Oxford
- Rosalie Lady Mander or Rosalie Glynn Grylls (1905–1988), British politician and writer
- Tim Mander (born 1961), Australian politician and former rugby league referee
- Ülo Mander (born 1954), Estonian ecologist, geographer and educator

== See also ==
- Manders, a surname
- Maunder (surname)
- Manter
