= Mander =

Mander may refer to:

== People ==
- Mander (surname), a list of people
- Mander people, an ethnic group in Papua, Indonesia
- Mander family, a prominent English family
- Martin Ander (born 1976), nicknamed "Mander", Swedish graphic designer, illustrator and artist

== Places ==
- Mander, Punjab, India, a village
- Mander, SBS Nagar, Punjab, India, a village
- Mander, Overijssel, Netherlands, a village

== Businesses ==
- Mander Brothers, a company based in Wolverhampton, England (1773–1998)
- Mander Centre, Wolverhampton, England, a shopping centre
- Mander Organs, an English pipe organ maker and refurbisher based in London

== Other uses ==
- Mander baronets, a title in the Baronetage of the United Kingdom
- Mander language, a nearly extinct Papuan language of Indonesia

== See also ==
- Manders
