= Charles Mander =

Charles Mander may refer to:

- Sir Charles Tertius Mander (1852–1929), British manufacturer, philanthropist and public servant
- Sir Charles Arthur Mander (1884–1952), British public servant, philanthropist, and manufacturer
- Sir Charles Marcus Mander (1921–2006), British industrialist, property developer, landowner and farmer
