= Grand Theatre, Wolverhampton =

Theatre in Wolverhampton, England

Coordinates: 52.5869°N 2.1257°W

Grand Theatre Wolverhampton
- The Grand
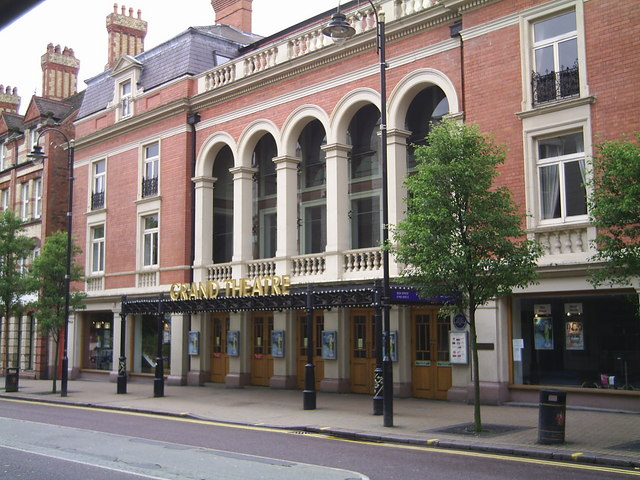
- Interactive map of Grand Theatre Wolverhampton
- Address: Lichfield Street; Wolverhampton; United Kingdom
- Owner: City of Wolverhampton Council
- Operator: Wolverhampton Grand Theatre (1982) Ltd
- Capacity: 1200
- Current use: Musicals, pantomime, opera, ballet, plays and Concerts

Construction
- Opened: 1894
- Renovated: 1998 & 2014
- Reopened: 1982
- Architect: C J Phipps

Website
- www.GrandTheatre.co.uk

The Wolverhampton Grand Theatre, commonly known as The Grand, is a theatre located on Lichfield Street, Wolverhampton. The theatre was designed in 1894 by Architect Charles J. Phipps. It is a Grade II Listed Building with a seating capacity of 1200.

== 1894–1939 ==
The Grand Theatre opened on 10 December 1894. It was not Wolverhampton's first theatre but has outlasted its rivals, including the Star Theatre, later known as the Theatre Royal, Clifton Cinema in Bilston Street, the Empire Palace, and later the Hippodrome in Queen Square which was destroyed by fire in the 1950s.

The site chosen for the new building was to replace the decaying eyesore next to the Victoria Hotel, later the Britannia Hotel, in Lichfield Street, then as now, a major thoroughfare close to the city centre. The driving force behind the theatre in these early stages was Alderman Charles Tertius Mander, Mayor of Wolverhampton.

The theatre was designed by eminent theatre architect Charles J. Phipps and incorporated four shops, two on either side of the main entrance, on its 123-foot frontage. Wolverhampton builder Henry Gough was appointed to carry out the construction work, which cost at that time an estimated £10,000. Astonishingly the theatre was completed in less than six months, from the laying of foundation stone by Mrs C.T. Mander on 28 June 1894 to the grand opening on 10 December 1894. The façade of the building has hardly altered during its two major refurbishments.

The seating capacity in 1894 was a staggering 2151. In the nineteenth century, seating in the auditorium was segregated by class, with the Dress Circle reserved for the gentry. For those "ordinary" people lucky enough to get in, they watched from the gallery where seats could not be booked in advance. The interior was overwhelming with its predominant colours of cream and claret and the ornate ceiling plasterwork. The decorations adorning the box and circle fronts and proscenium arch were painted gold. The theatre, with the exception of the stage, was lit by electricity.

The D'Oyly Carte Opera Company performed Gilbert and Sullivan's Utopia, Limited on the grand opening night of 10 December 1894.

For the next few years, people enjoyed entertainment varying from large-scale musicals and Shakespeare's plays to "wholesome" dramas. Starring in such productions the Grand played host to both the famous and soon to be famous. These included Sir Henry Irving the renowned Lyceum actor and a young Charlie Chaplin who was recorded as being company call boy in 1902. Chaplain later starred at the Grand in one of his first acting debuts as Dr Watson's pageboy in Sherlock Holmes.

In 1909 the Grand was chosen for a spectacle of quite a different kind, when the president of the Board of Trade, Winston Churchill addressed the Budget League from the theatre's stage. Nine years later in 1918, Prime Minister, David Lloyd George played to a full house when he opened the Government's general election campaign. He vowed 'to make Britain a fit country for heroes to live in' during his election campaign speech.

Until the early 1920s, the Grand was a touring theatre. It had no resident corps of actors but rather played host to a huge number of visiting professional companies, and also to various local amateur groups. During the recession all this changed and the Grand became a repertory theatre, initially under the direction of Leon Salberg.

This shift in emphasis meant that the stage and backstage facilities became available to a whole new generation of aspiring professionals, many of whom went on to become household names. During the thirties, forties and fifties, many future stars including Kenneth More, Peggy Mount, June Whitfield and Leonard Rossiter developed their talents in front of a discerning Black Country audience. Another famous daughter of Wolverhampton, and the Grand in particular, was Gwen Berryman, who later found nationwide fame playing Doris Archer in the well known BBC Radio series The Archers.

== 1939–1980 ==
The Second World War hit the theatre badly. Rationing and shortages of materials meant that shows became austere and it was increasingly difficult to fill the house. Although post-war euphoria brought with it increased audiences, by the fifties the days of large repertory companies were numbered. There were of course some memorable moments, such as the Grand's diamond jubilee production in 1944 of South Pacific, featuring a young Sean Connery, but by then large rep companies were dying out.

The main problem was television. Across the country, provincial theatres were losing audiences and rep companies were disbanding. The Grand avoided closure by changing its format once again and 1959 saw the return of touring companies including Michael Caine and Terence Stamp in a production of The Long and the Short and the Tall, but even these failed to counteract the steady decline in audiences.

The late 1950s and 1960s also saw the return of variety shows and many famous stars appeared, notably singing star David Whitfield, who had more hit records than any other recording artist in the fifties. His last appearance at the Grand was in 1977. Eventually however in 1969, the Myatt Family, the principal shareholders were forced to sell the Grand Theatre to the local authority for £74,000. Thus ended a remarkable era - the theatre had been owned by the descendants of the original shareholders for 75 years.

The theatre underwent a small renovation in 1970, with the auditorium repainted from its old Wedgewood blue, white and gold to the new Spanish Chestnut red, white and gold. The painting was done on Sundays in August of that year, by sixty or seventy volunteers from the Grand Theatre Club. The paint was donated by the Mander family, and later a cheque from Bilston Operatic Society paid for the temporary scaffolding.

John Holland, a member of the Grand Theatre Club at the time, said about the refurbishment:

'I was the first Hon Secretary of the Theatre Club. We decorated the entire auditorium over a weekend. Ron Howard and I continued to add touches to the paintwork for many weeks’.

The paint was donated by the Mander family, local paint and ink manufacturers and developers of the Mander Centre.

Public money was needed to keep the theatre open. In order to attract funding from Arts Council England the theatre was made into a non-profit making trust, subsequently, a new company, Grand Theatre Wolverhampton Ltd, was born. The company began refurbishing the theatre in 1973, laying down a new stage, improving lighting in the building and strengthening the back wall in Berry Street. Throughout the seventies the Grand enjoyed some success with pantomime and numerous touring productions of musicals, ballet, opera and plays, but, as audiences again began to decline, the theatre was forced to close in 1980.

Fortunately, there were some Wulfrunians who recognised the need for live theatre, and immediately after the curtain fell in 1980 a public meeting was held to start a campaign to re-open the Grand. Fifty people attended the meeting and from that night the "Save the Grand Action Group" was born. Working in co-operation with Wolverhampton Borough Council, renovation work began while the council agreed that in common with other theatres of similar size, a substantial annual subsidy was required to enable the theatre operate successfully. With a grant from the Department of the Environment, the immense task of restoring the building began. The grant was awarded dependent upon the auditorium being restored to its original state. Consequently, the ceilings, boxes and proscenium arch which were painted cream and gold from the original colour scheme, while the use of claret that had predominated up until then, was restricted.

== 1980–present ==
Seating in the Upper Circle was redesigned, now with an overall capacity of 1200, and the existing seats were stripped and rebuilt, an induction loop was installed for the hard of hearing and ventilation systems were completely renewed. The Dress Circle was given a much more spacious area for patrons to wait before entering the auditorium; while in the foyer new glass doors helped open the theatre to the public outside.

In 1982 when the Grand re-opened it was one of the best-equipped theatres in the country. During the next ten years or so the Grand enjoyed many successes attracting the best touring companies and the theatre enjoyed by a loyal and supportive audience.

On 10 December 1994, the Grand celebrated its 100th birthday with a gala performance by the D'Oyly Carte Opera Company. It was exactly 100 years to the day since the company had opened the Grand Theatre.

The theatre's centenary offered a new incentive to ensure the long-term viability of the theatre was secured. To this end feasibility studies were carried out to look out how the theatre could be improved to meet the ever-increasing expectations of modern theatregoers.

The country's leading theatre architects RHWL were appointed in 1997 with a brief to continue the achievements of the earlier renovation. Their task was to improve access and circulation, to install lifts and air conditioning, to update the theatre's facilities and redecorate the theatre to enhance the beautiful style and features created by Phipps. With a successful application to the National Lottery through the Arts Council of England and partnership funding from the European Regional Development Fund, the £8 million refurbishment of the Grand Theatre was completed in December 1998.

In 2014 it was confirmed that the Grand Theatre would undergo a major refurbishment as part of the Black Country Growth Deal, along with the Wolves Civic. This would help enable the theatre to stage larger scale shows.

In 2019, the Grand successfully acquired planning permission to transform the former Post Office which was located next door to the theatre into the Green Room a brand-new arts venue. Internationally renowned architect Keith R Williams produced the digital designs for the build. The new building was to feature a theatre as well as rehearsal spaces. The renovated building would have played host to alternative events such as exhibitions, concerts and performances by local community groups. The transformation was estimated to cost £3 million. Despite good progress being made on these plans, the site was converted into Shakespeare House; a block of one bed flats. This, of course, put a halt to the Grand's expansion which began as one of the projects funded by Wolverhampton's Towns Fund which was worth a total of £25 million.

After the theatre received a £2 million expansion grant from the government in 2023, they announcement that they would purchase the former music venue the Slade Rooms. The purpose of this was similar to that of the Green Room plan explained above. After the conversion, the venue will feature a 250-seat studio theatre as well as rehearsal rooms, smaller performance spaces and exhibition facilities. This will be a standalone from the theatre.

On the 22 September 2026 it was announced that The Grand has joined the Regional Independent Theatre Alliance (RITA). The Grand is the 6th theatre to join RITA along with the Birmingham Hippodrome, Leeds Heritage Theatres, Norwich Theatre, Newcastle Theatre Royal and the Marlowe Theatre, Canterbury. RITA was launched in June 2026 to champion the distinctive “third way” model within the theatre sector: charitable, not-for-profit organisations that operate as growth engines without day-to-day public subsidy, while reinvesting their surpluses into artistic programmes, audiences and their communities. A spokes person for RITA commented; “We are delighted to welcome our sixth member of RITA. Wolverhampton Grand Theatre embodies the values that bring our alliance together: a mission-driven, financially self-reliant theatre with deep roots in its community and a clear ambition to create lasting impact.” Karen Smallwood, the Chief Executive Officer for the Grand also stated; “Joining RITA is a natural step for Wolverhampton Grand Theatre. As an independent venue deeply rooted in our community, we operate at scale, sustaining our work through commercial success while reinvesting in local culture. Together with our alliance partners, we look forward to ensuring the immense economic, social and cultural value of independent regional theatre is fully recognised in national policy.”

== Amateur Groups ==
Over the years the theatre has been home to local amateur groups who would perform at the theatre for a week every year. These have included;

- Bilston Operatic Company
- South Staffs Musical Theatre Company; formerly South Staffs Operatic Society
- West Bromwich Operatic Society (WBOS)
- Wolverhampton Musical Comedy Company (MUSCOM)

== Producing ==
In 2017, the Wolverhampton Grand Theatre made a return to producing theatre in-house at the venue. The first in-house production in forty years, Brassed Off, which played from 23 August to 2 September, starred Jeffrey Holland as Danny and featured both professional actors and actors from the local community. Principal cast was as follows - Ash Matthews (Shane), Chris Connel (Andy), Miriam Grace Edwards (Sandra), Clara Darcy (Gloria), Greg Yates (Jim), Tim Jones (Harry), Donna Heaslip (Rita) and Susie Wilcox (Vera).

In 2018, they produced a newly adapted Black Country themed version of Amanda Whittington's play Ladies' Day. Emmerdale's Deena Payne played Pearl, EastEnders star Cheryl Fergison portrayed Jan, Emma Rigby of Hollyoaks was Shelley and Father Brown actress Roisin O'Neill played Linda. They were also joined by Sean Mckenzie in all the male roles. 'Amarillo' singer and midlands local Tony Christie sang live in the show which played from 13 to 28 July.

The theatre is due to produce an immersively staged version of I Love You, You're Perfect, Now Change which will see the audience seated on the stage, reducing the usual seating capacity of 1,200 to 150. The musical, which proved popular Off-Broadway, is due to play eight performances at The Grand between 16 and 20 July 2024 before it transfers to the Edinburgh Fringe Festival where it will play from 2 to 24 August 2024. This production will be the first in-house musical produced by the venue.

After The Grand's successful run of I Love You, You're Perfect, Now Change in 2024 at the Edinburgh Fringe Festival the Grand will return there for the 2026 festival with Moneypenny and Tuffrey's The Shocking Truth About Flat Earth, a brand-new, original musical comedy blending conspiracy and catchy tunes to tell the story of a woman who believes Earth is flat... and now wants to prove it. The musical had its premiere and three performances at The Cockpit in September 2025. The show is now being developed by Wolverhampton Grand for the Edinburgh Fringe Festival where it will play at Pleasance Queen Dome from 5–30 August 2026. Prior to the run at the festival there will be a limited run at the Old Joint Stock Theatre from 29 July-1 August in Birmingham, with the production directed by Karl Steele.

=== Pantomime ===
After many years of external pantomime productions from Crossroads Pantomimes, formerly Qdos Entertainment, the Grand decided to start once again produce their own in-house pantomimes, with the first being Cinderella for the 2021/22 season, starring AJ and Curtis Pritchard, Evie Pickerill, Tam Ryan and Ian Adams. The production was the first in-house pantomime and was postponed from the 2020/21 season due to the COVID-19 pandemic. It was produced in association with Imagine Theatre. The following year, Aladdin was co-produced with Evolution Productions.

The 2023/24 season production, Snow White, was the first fully in-house pantomime at the Grand. They produced the show entirely independently and sourced sets and costumes locally. As has become tradition, the show was also written in-house by panto stars Tam Ryan and the theatre's resident dame Ian Adams.

In May 2024, the first of new casting announcements was made for the 2024/25 season. Jamie Christian-Johal aka Giant from the BBC's Gladiators, will star in the upcoming pantomime, making his panto debut.

It was announced on the 29 November 2024, that the pantomime for 2025/26 season is Sleeping Beauty, once again the show will be written by and star Tam Ryan and Ian Adams, with further casting to be announced.

On September 1, 2025, the full cast was announced for the 2025/26 panto Sleeping Beauty. Joining the previously-announced Tam Ryan and Ian Adams, Danny Beard RuPaul's Drag Race UK was cast in the role of Carabosse, while Debra Stephenson was scheduled to play Queen Bertha of Bilstonia. Zak Douglas, who starred in BAFTA-nominated ITV Comedy The Good Ship Murder, was cast as The Herald. Additionally, Solomon Davy was cast to play the Prince, with Georgia Iudica-Davies as the Princess.

On 24 November 2025 the Grand announced their Pantomime for the 2026/27 season, Treasure Island. Treasure Island will mark Ian Adams tenth year as Dame at the Grand and once again will be joined by Tam Ryan who will both star and write the pantomime for their sixth consecutive season. The season also marks a premiere for the theatre as the pantomime has never been seen at the theatre before and said to be packed with pirates, parrots and pure entertainment.

The principal cast for the 2026/27 pantomime Treasure Island was announced to co-inside with National Pirate Day 19th September 2026. Joining Tam Ryan and Ian Adams, who celebrates his 10th year as Dame at the Grand, playing Long John Silver is Richard Blackwood. Returning due to popular demand, Wolverhampton born and West End star Solomon Davy will play Jack Hawkins and another returning cast member after playing Davina the Peaky Miner in Snow White, Leonie Wall will play Charlotte Trelawney.

On the 2 October 2026, further casting was announced at the official launch of the 2026/27 pantomime Treasure Island at Drayton Manor Theme Park. Joining the already announced cast are Alexia McIntosh (SIX, Original West End Company) as Captain Ruby and David Burrows (The Wizard of Oz, Annie, Half A Sixpence) as Squire Trelawney, with performances due to start on Saturday 28 November.

=== Pantomime season ===
Year	Production	Performance Run	Principal Cast	Ensemble Cast	Produced with
2019/20	Dick Whittington	7 December 2019 - 12 January 2020	Su Pollard Ryan Thomas Jeffrey Holland Ian Adams Julie Paton Aaron James Katie Marie-Cater Jordan Ginger Tom Roberts	Georgia Curtis Louis Geirnaert Stylianos Hadjisavvos Chloe Lindsay Amy Murchison Joseph Roberts Holly Vernon-Harcourt James Wakeling	Qdos Entertainment
2021/22	Cinderella	4 December 2021 - 9 January 2022	AJ Pritchard; Curtis Pritchard; Evie Pickerill; Denise Pearson Tam Ryan Ian Adams Britt Lenting Ella Biddlecombe Julie Stark Aimee Fisher	Laura Marie Benson Chloe Evans Sophie Sheridan Eddie Slattery Philip Town Michael Dean Wilson	Imagine Theatre
2022/23	Aladdin	3 December 2022 - 7 January 2023	Zoe Birkett; Michael Greco; Ben Cajee; Tam Ryan; Ian Adams Sofie Anné Ian Billings Duane Gooden	Lydia Baber-Day Samara Clarke Ellie Cooper Gabriella Rose Marchant Louis Quinn Jack Skelton Jacob Thomas Jayd'N Tyrone	Evolution Productions
2023/24	Snow White	2 December 2023 - 7 January 2024	Kelle Bryan; Niki Colwell Evans; Evie Pickerill Gyasi Sheppy; Tam Ryan; Ian Adams Eliza Waters	Elliott Baker-Costello Charlie Donnelly Lucy Nolan Elise Prosser Daniel Walford Jack Skelton Ollie Thomas-Smith Leonie Wall	A Wolverhampton Grand Theatre production
2024/25	Beauty and the Beast	30 November 2024 - 5 January 2025	Jamie Christian-Johal; Tam Ryan; Ian Adams Jarnéia Richard-Noel; Olivia Mitchell; Tom Lowe; Timothy Lucas	Sam Cherry Harry Dutton Jack Kempson Jedidiah Leafe Lydia Moynihan Amy Page Holly Pearce Lucy Rice Daniel Walford	Imagine Theatre
2025/26	Sleeping Beauty	29 November 2025 - 4 January 2026	Danny Beard; Debra Stephenson Zak Douglas; Tam Ryan; Ian Adams; Solomon Davy; Georgia Iudica-Davies	Sofia Bennett Jack Buchanan Kiera Haynes Caitlin Mae Hutley Jack Kempson Macy Pollington Anna Rogers Ben Simon-Wilson	A Wolverhampton Grand Theatre production
2026/27	Treasure Island	28 November 2026 - 3 January 2027	Richard Blackwood; Tam Ryan; Ian Adams; Alexia McIntosh; David Burrows; Solomon Davy; Leonie Wall	TBC	A Wolverhampton Grand Theatre production

== The UK Pantomime Association (UKPA): The Pantomime Awards ==
=== 2022 ===
Winner: Best Comic (sponsored by Box Office Radio) Tam Ryan – Cinderella, Wolverhampton Grand Theatre (Imagine Theatre)

=== 2024 ===
Winner: Best Set Design (Sponsored by Blue i Group): David Shields: Snow White, Grand Theatre Wolverhampton (In-House)

=== 2026 ===
Nominated: Best Script: Ian Adams and Tam Ryan: Sleeping Beauty, Wolverhampton Grand Theatre (In-House)

Nominated: Best Villain: Danny Beard: Sleeping Beauty, Wolverhampton Grand Theatre (In-House)

Winner: Best Pantomime (Over 950 Seats) (Sponsored By Unusual Rigging): Sleeping Beauty; Wolverhampton Grand Theatre (In-House)
