= Wightwick =

Neighbourhood in Wolverhampton, England

Coordinates: 52.584°N 2.198°W

Wightwick (/ˈwɪtɪk/ WIT-ik) is a part of Tettenhall Wightwick ward in Wolverhampton, West Midlands, England. It is named after an ancient local family the "de Wightwicks". It is on the western fringe of Wolverhampton and borders the rural South Staffordshire area that includes neighbourhoods such as Perton.

Of note is Wightwick Manor, a Victorian era manor house in the arts and crafts style. The interior features extensive use of William Morris designs and is noted as one of his pioneering works. The house is the former home of the Mander family who achieved wealth through the ownership of Mander Brothers, paint and varnish manufacturers since 1773, and fame through public service and political office. Sir Geoffrey Le Mesurier Mander was the first of the Mander family to sit in the House of Commons. The house is now in the hands of the National Trust. The Mander family also owned the nearby 'Mount', seat of the Mander Baronets, which is now a hotel and conference centre with views as far as the Malvern hills, over 40 miles (64 km) away.

Wightwick Hall is also in the area, being less than a mile via the lanes that connect the two properties. Sir Alfred Hickman owned Wightwick Hall. Nearby Elmsdale Hall was owned by the former Wolverhampton Mayor and industrialist Sir John Morris. Morris was spontaneously knighted by Queen Victoria in 1866 at her first public appearance since the death of her husband Albert, for the unveiling of a statue of her dead husband. The hall has been converted to residential apartments.

The Staffordshire and Worcestershire canal and the Smestow Brook run through the valley beneath Wightwick Manor, roughly parallel to the 'Bridgnorth Road'.

Wightwick is an extremely pleasant part of the more traditionally affluent western side of Wolverhampton.
