= Tettenhall Wood =

Suburb of Wolverhampton, West Midlands, England

Coordinates: 52.591°N 2.181°W

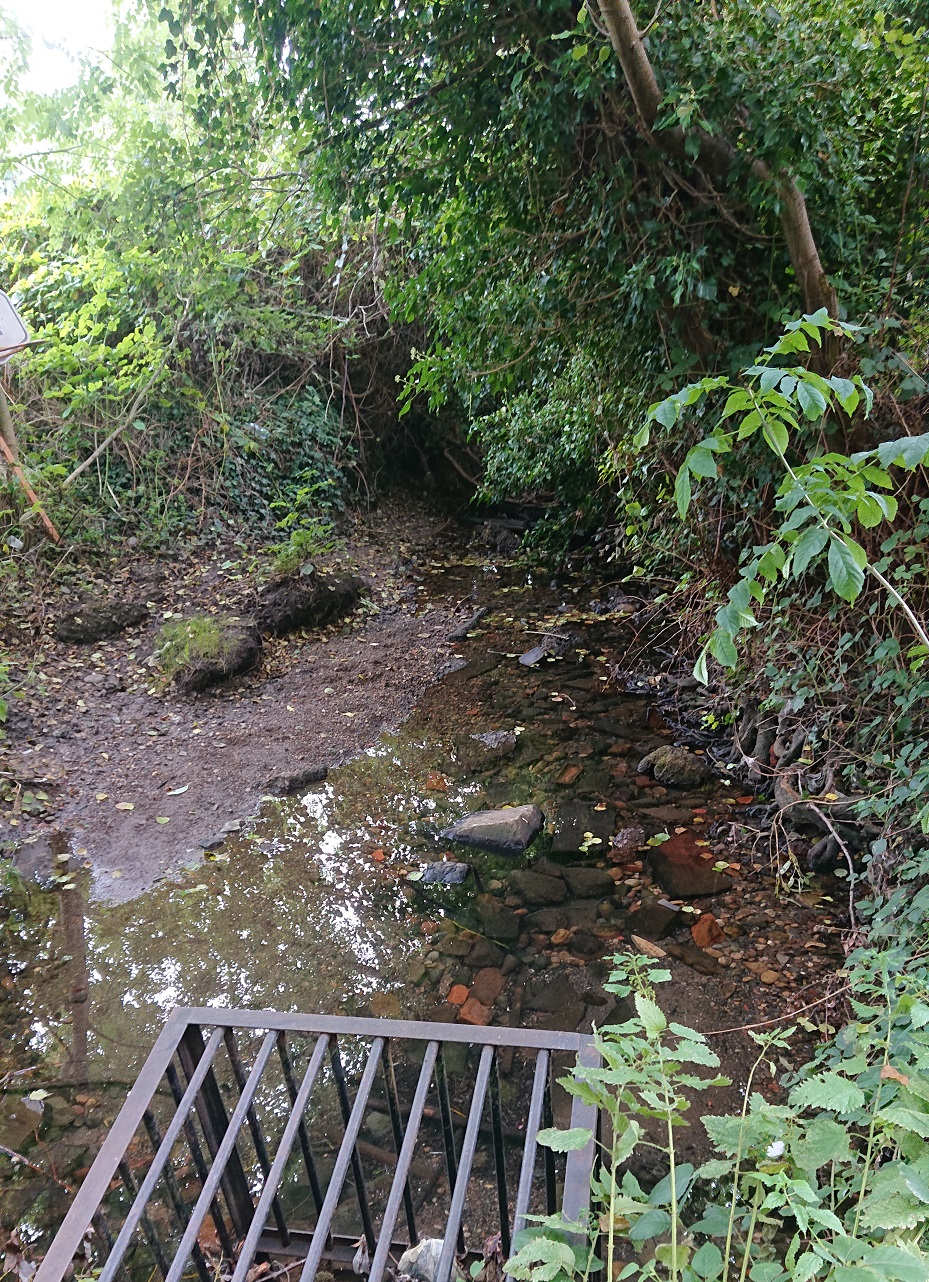
Source of the River Penk at Tettenhall Wood

Tettenhall Wood is a suburb of Wolverhampton, West Midlands, England. It is west of Wolverhampton city centre, within the Tettenhall Wightwick ward. It sits high on a relatively steep hill and it is claimed that the Malvern Hills can be seen from some of the houses located in the area. To its west lies Wightwick, to its south Compton to its east Tettenhall. Also to its north lies the boundary of the West Midlands conurbation and also that of Wolverhampton metropolitan authority with South Staffordshire. The River Penk rises in the area, at Penk Rise Park.

Tettenhall Wood is a largely residential area and is relatively affluent. It has a relatively low crime rate and a growing population of younger people.

The area has two churches: Christ Church and the United Reformed Church. It has a small shopping district with a small local supermarket and one public house lie in the area. A local house of note "The Mount" is situated within the area; it was rebuilt in the late 19th century in English Renaissance style as the seat of the Mander family, baronets, who founded Mander Brothers, paint and varnish manufacturers, in 1773, and were noted public servants and philanthropists in Wolverhampton.

The area is served by the 1 (Dudley via Wolverhampton) and 10/10A(Wolverhampton to Perton/Pattingham via Compton) bus routes operated by National Express West Midlands. Additional journeys on the 1 are operated by Travel Express. The 109-year-old Tettenhall Wood Working Men's Institute (known locally as 'the Institute') is situated in the heart of Tettenhall Wood. The institute caters for local community groups and associations; unusually for such an organisation it is independent of the local council.

Tettenhall Wood also has Christ Church Infants Nursery, which is located in the former Tettenhall Wood Library. Tettenhall Wood is no longer served by a mobile library.
