= Carfax =

Carfax may refer to:

== Places ==
- Carfax, Oxford, England
  - Carfax Conduit, a water conduit that supplied Oxford from 1617 until the 19th century
  - Carfax College, an independent school in Oxford
- Carfax, the centre of Horsham, West Sussex, England

== NASCAR racing ==
- Carfax 250, now Irish Hills 250
- Carfax 400, now Pure Michigan 400

== Other uses ==
- Carfax, Inc., a commercial web-based service that supplies vehicle history reports
- Carfax Gallery (or Carfax & Co) in London, co-founded by William Rothenstein
- Carfax, or Carfax Abbey, fictional home in England of Count Dracula
- Carfax, a fictional town in Virginia and home of the narrator in "The Rats in the Walls", from H.P. Lovecraft
- Carfax, a project of artist/musician Mikey Georgeson
- Carfax, leading character in Other People's Sins, a 1931 British crime film
- Carfax, a former academic publish now owned by Taylor & Francis

== See also ==
- Battle of Carfax, a 1936 fight between fascists and anti-fascists in Oxford
- "The Disappearance of Lady Frances Carfax", a Sherlock Holmes story by Sir Arthur Conan Doyle
- The Clever Mrs. Carfax, a 1917 American comedy silent film
