= Manter =

Manter is an English surname, possibly a variant of Mander. Notable people with the surname include:

- Jerauld Manter, American zoologist and amateur photographer
- Nancy Manter, American visual artist

== See also ==
- Munter
