= Maunder =

Maunder may refer to:

- Maunder (lunar crater)
- Maunder (Martian crater)
- Maunder (surname)
- Maunder Minimum, a period in the 17th–18th centuries when sunspots became exceedingly rare
