= Markham baronets of Beachborough Park (1911) =

Baronetcy

Markham baronets
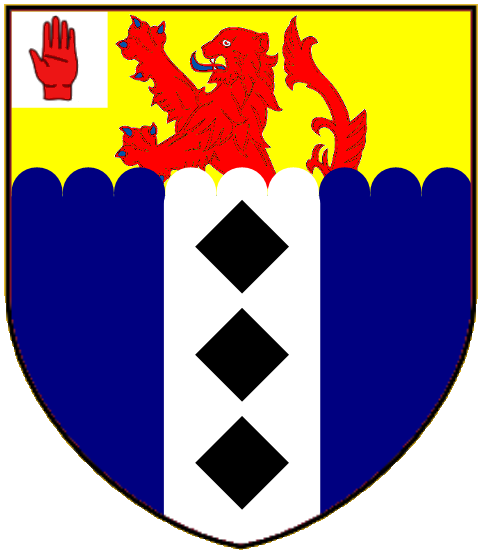
- Escutcheon of the Markham baronets of Beachborough Park
- Creation date: 1911
- Status: extant
- Motto: Tenax Propositi, Firm of purpose
- Arms: Azure on a pale Argent three lozenges Sable issuant from a chief engrailed Or a demi-lion rampant Gules
- Crest: The winged lion of Saint Mark passant guardant Or resting its dexter fore-paw on a lozenge as in the arms the halo Gules

The Markham baronetcy, of Beachborough Park in Newington in the County of Kent, was created in the Baronetage of the United Kingdom on 10 July 1911 for Arthur Markham. He represented Mansfield in the House of Commons from 1900 to 1916.

The 3rd baronet was a member of the Legislative Council of Kenya from 1955 to 1960.

== Markham baronets, of Beachborough Park (1911) ==
- Sir Arthur Basil Markham, 1st Baronet (1866–1916)
- Sir Charles Markham, 2nd Baronet (1899–1952)
- Sir Charles John Markham, 3rd Baronet (1924–2006)
- Sir (Arthur) David Markham, 4th Baronet (born 1950)

The current holder has two daughters. The heir presumptive is his younger brother Richard Barry Markham (born 1954).

== Extended family ==
- Charles Paxton Markham (1865–1926), elder brother of the 1st baronet, headed the Staveley Coal and Iron Company.

== Notes ==
Baronetage of the United Kingdom
Preceded by Mander baronets	Markham baronets of Beachborough Park; 10 July 1911	Succeeded by Osler baronets
