= Lama Hasan =

British journalist

Lama Hasan is a London-based British journalist for ABC News and BBC News.

== Life ==
Lama Hasan has been an on-air contributor for ABC News since May 2010. Her field work has appeared on Good Morning America, World News Tonight, Nightline, ABC News Now (ABC's 24-hour news channel) and on ABC affiliate stations.

Hasan currently anchors World View on ABC News Now as well as reporting on other breaking news events for the channel. She has covered major news stories, including the funeral of Pope John Paul II and Israel's withdrawal from Gaza. Fluent in Arabic, she has also done extensive reporting on the Arab reaction to the Second Gulf War.

She is a graduate of Mander Portman Woodward, Queen's College, Oxford and University College London. She is a Muslim.
