= Charles Tertius Mander =

Sir Charles Tertius Mander, 1st Baronet
- Born: 16 July 1852; Wolverhampton, Staffordshire, England
- Died: 8 April 1929 (aged 76); The Mount, Tettenhall Wood, Staffordshire, England
- Resting place: Mander family vault, St Peter's, Wolverhampton
- Education: Rugby School
- Alma mater: Corpus Christi College, Cambridge
- Occupations: public servant, industrialist, philanthropist
- Title: baronet
- Successor: Sir Charles Arthur Mander, 2nd baronet
- Political party: Conservative
- Board member of: Mander Brothers, Thomas Parker, Queen's Square Syndicate
- Spouse: Mary Le Mesurier Paint
- Children: 2 sons, Charles Arthur and Gerald Poynton; one dau., Daisy St Clair
- Parent(s): Charles Benjamin Mander and Sophia Weaver
- Website: Charles Tertius Mander

Sir Charles Tertius Mander, 1st Baronet JP, DL, TD (16 July 1852 – 8 April 1929) was a Midland manufacturer (and as such Royal Warrant holder), philanthropist and public servant, of Wolverhampton, England.

== Biography ==
Mander was the eldest son of Charles Benjamin Mander, of a family of early industrialists and public servants prominent in the public and civic life of Wolverhampton since 1745. He was educated at Rugby School and at Corpus Christi College, Cambridge.

Charles Tertius Mander served as a councillor for Wolverhampton Borough Council from 1886. Among many public offices, he was uniquely four times mayor of Wolverhampton 1892–6; an alderman; and was awarded the honorary freedom of the borough of Wolverhampton in 1897. He was the progressive chairman of the Lighting Committee (1893–1902), the Wolverhampton Corporation Tramways Committee (1896–1920), where he was an advocate of the American Lorain system of surface contact, and of the Watch Committee (1920–7). He was outstanding for his hospitality as mayor, donating seasonal gifts, including warm underwear for cabmen, tram conductors and drivers, hosting a dinner for one thousand destitute children and the poor at the Agricultural Hall, and entertaining the local elite in the drill hall. He served as High Sheriff of Staffordshire in 1903. He also served for many years in the Staffordshire Yeomanry (Queen's Own Royal Regiment), as captain from the 1890, as major from March 1902, and lastly as colonel.

He was a progressive industrialist and manufacturer as senior partner and then first chairman of Mander Brothers (1923), the family paint, varnish and printing inks works founded by his great-grandfather in 1773. He was also active in many other companies, including acting as chairman of Thomas Parker, a Midland electrical company credited with the invention of the sparking plug, the monoblock engine and the carburettor, and chairman of the Queen's Square Syndicate (1907–29).

He was a landowner, pioneer motorist and enthusiastic sportsman. In the 1870s, he played full-back for Wolverhampton Rugby Football Club, of which he later became president. He was also vice-president of Wolverhampton Wanderers Football Club and Wolverhampton and District Football League. He was devoted to field sports and an active member of the Albrighton Hunt.

He extended the family house at The Mount (since 1955 a hotel) in two phases: first in 1891, then in 1909 in neo-Renaissance style to the designs of Edward Ould (of Liverpool), who also worked for his cousin Theodore at Wightwick Manor, now owned by the National Trust and considered one of the most notable Arts and Crafts movement houses in England. The Mount and its collections were visited by many public figures, including Queen Mary and Lloyd George, who announced his 'coupon' election when staying as a guest of the Manders in November 1918.

He was created the first Baronet of the Mount, Tettenhall Wood, in the Coronation honours of George V for his public services on 8 July 1911.

== Family ==
He married Mary le Mesurier Paint, the daughter of Canadian Member of Parliament Henry Nicholas Paint, at Halifax in 1883, and had three children.

He died suddenly at his home on 8 April 1929, when he was given a civic funeral. An internal memorial porch by Celestino Pancheri was erected in his memory at St Peter's Collegiate Church, Wolverhampton, where he is buried in the family vault. He was succeeded in the baronetcy by his elder son, Charles Arthur Mander (1884–1951).

== See also ==
- Mander family
- Mander Baronets
- Mander Brothers

== Sources ==
- Sir Geoffrey Le Mesurier Mander (ed), The History of Mander Brothers (Wolverhampton, Whitehead Brothers, n.d. [1955])
- Nicholas Mander, Varnished leaves : a biography of the Mander family of Wolverhampton, 1750-1950. (Dursley: Owlpen Press. 2004.) ISBN 0-9546056-0-8 (chapters 8–12).
- Mosley, Charles, editor, Burke's Peerage, Baronetage & Knightage, 107th edition, 3 volumes (Burke's Peerage (Genealogical Books) Ltd, 2003), volume 2, page 2589, sub Mander baronetcy of the Mount [U.K.], cr. 1911.
- Jones, J. The Mayors of Wolverhampton, vol. 2 [n.d.] [contains contemporary biographical essay]; W.H. Jones, The Municipal Life in Wolverhampton, London: Alexander & Shepherd Ltd, 1903.
- Obituary in The Times, April 10, 1929
- Nicholas Mander, Borromean Rings: The Genealogy of the Mander Family, 2nd edition, expanded and revised, Dursley: Owlpen Press, 2023.
- Our Contemporaries: a biographical repertoire of men and women of the day, 1896-7. London: Klene & Co. n.d. [contains contemporary biographical essay]
- The County of Stafford and many of its family records. Exeter: Wm Pollard & Co., 1897. [contains contemporary biographical essay]
- This article incorporates text from a free content work. Licensed under CC-BY-SA and the GFDL (license statement/permission). Text taken from Charles Tertius Mander.

Baronetage of the United Kingdom
New creation	Baronet (of The Mount); 1911–1929	Succeeded by Charles Arthur Mander
Political offices
Preceded by James Saunders	Mayor of Wolverhampton; 1892–1896	Succeeded by Stephen Craddock
