= Charles Marcus Mander =

Sir Charles Marcus Mander, 3rd Baronet
- Born: 22 September 1921; Kilsall Hall, Tong, Shropshire, England
- Died: 9 August 2006 (aged 84); Newport Hospital, Isle of Wight, England
- Resting place: Burford, Oxfordshire
- Education: Eton College; Trinity College, Cambridge
- Occupations: industrialist, landowner and farmer, property developer
- Title: baronet
- Predecessor: Sir Charles Arthur Mander, 2nd baronet
- Successor: Sir Charles Nicholas Mander, 4th baronet
- Political party: Conservative
- Board member of: Mander Brothers, Arlington Securities, London and Cambridge Investments
- Spouse: Maria Dolores Beatrice Brodermann
- Children: 2 sons: (Charles) Nicholas and Francis Peter; one dau., Penelope Anne
- Parent(s): Charles Arthur Mander and Monica Claire Cotterill Neame
- Website: An Appreciation of Sir Charles Marcus Mander

Sir Charles Marcus Mander, 3rd Baronet (22 September 1921 – 9 August 2006) was an industrialist, property developer, landowner and farmer. He was known as Marcus Mander to his family and friends.

== Biography ==
Charles Marcus Mander was the only son of Charles Arthur Mander, second baronet, by Monica Neame, of Kent, born at Kilsall Hall, Tong, Shropshire. He was educated at Wellesley House School, Eton College and Trinity College, Cambridge, but did not complete his degree following the outbreak of war.

After officer training at the Royal Military College, Sandhurst, he was commissioned in the Coldstream Guards in World War II, serving as a captain in North Africa and Italy, where, following the Salerno landings, he was gravely wounded in the fierce fighting at Calabritto on the slopes of Monte Camino, in October 1943. He later rejoined his Regiment, serving in Belgium and Germany.

From 1945, he was a director of Mander Brothers, the family paint, property and inks conglomerate, founded in Wolverhampton in 1773. He was soon responsible for its property portfolio, and promoted the redevelopment of the centre of Wolverhampton, where in 1968 the Mander Centre and Mander Square were established on the site of the Georgian family works. Sir Charles was High Sheriff of Staffordshire in 1962-63 before two City posts with property groups, first as chairman of Arlington Securities (sold to British Aerospace) and then as chairman of London & Cambridge Investments. He also developed a township for 11,500 people at Perton outside Wolverhampton on the family agricultural estate, which had been requisitioned as an airfield during World War II.

In the year 2000, he sold the mansion house and adjoining land at Little Barrow, Donnington, near Moreton-in-Marsh, Gloucestershire. It is believed that this was in order to meet underwriting losses at the Lloyd's insurance market after Lady Mander had been offered a settlement by Lloyd's, but refused, which resulted in her being declared bankrupt.

Sir Charles converted to Roman Catholicism following a business visit to Damascus in 1955. Shortly after, following family disagreement, he resigned his directorship with Mander Brothers.

== Family ==
Charles Marcus Mander married Maria Dolores, daughter of Alfred Edmund Brödermann, a banker of Hamburg, on 24 November 1945, by whom he had three children:

1. (Charles) Nicholas (b. 23 March 1950).
2. Francis Peter (b. 4 December 1952). He married Georgina Thring (issue: two sons).
3. Penelope Anne Mary (b. 22 September 1946). She married firstly Michael Rollo Hoare, a partner in C. Hoare & Co., bankers (issue: two daughters), and secondly Simon Loder (issue: one son).

Baronetage of the United Kingdom
Preceded by Charles Arthur Mander	Baronet (of The Mount); 1951–2006	Succeeded by (Charles) Nicholas Mander

== See also ==
- Mander family
- Mander Baronets
- Mander Brothers

== Sources ==
- Sir Geoffrey Le Mesurier Mander (ed), The History of Mander Brothers (Wolverhampton, n.d. [1955])
- Charles Nicholas Mander, Varnished Leaves: a biography of the Mander Family of Wolverhampton, 1750-1950 (Owlpen Press, 2004)
- Nicholas Mander, The Queen of Seven Swords (Owlpen Press, 2013), pp. 275–349 ISBN 978-0-9546056-5-0
- Mosley, Charles, editor, Burke's Peerage, Baronetage & Knightage, 107th edition, 3 volumes (Burke's Peerage (Genealogical Books) Ltd, 2003), volume 2, page 2589, sub Mander baronetcy of the Mount [U.K.], cr. 1911
- Kidd, Charles (editor), Debrett's Peerage and Baronetage, Debrett’s, 2008, B 626-7
- Who’s Who, A&C Black, various editions
