= John Mander =

British political commentator, writer, translator and poet

- Born: 28 May 1932; Wolverhampton, England
- Died: 2 September 1978 (aged 46); Islington, United Kingdom
- Occupations: critic, poet, translator, essayist, journalist
- Relatives: Geoffrey Mander (father); Mander family Rosalie Glynn Grylls (mother)
- Writing career
- Period: 1959–1978
- Genres: cultural and political criticism, poetry
- Subject: British

John Geoffrey Grylls Mander (28 May 1932 – 2 September 1978) was a British political commentator, writer, translator and poet.

== Childhood, education and personal life ==
Mander was the younger son of Sir Geoffrey Mander, a Wolverhampton industrialist and Liberal politician, by his second wife Rosalie Glynn Grylls, herself a Liberal political activist in the 1920s and then writer, biographer and art collector.

Mander grew up at Wightwick Manor, near Wolverhampton, going on to Eton College and Trinity College, Cambridge, where he established a reputation for his poetry. He first married Gertrud (called Necke) Bracher (1927–2018) of Stuttgart, the youngest sister of Karl Dietrich Bracher, on 17 December 1956, whom he met while in Germany. They were divorced in 1968, and he married Penelope Loveday Williams on 19 April 1969. He died in September 1978.

== Career and writings ==
From 1954 to 1958 Mander lived in Berlin and Munich, gaining a detailed knowledge of German language and culture in the then West Germany. He returned to live in Islington, London, in 1958, becoming Assistant Literary Editor of the New Statesman from 1960 to 1962 and then from 1963 to 1965 the Assistant Editor of Encounter, serving on its editorial broad for eight years.

Mander published several books on Germany. The first two, The Eagle and the Bear (1959) and a Penguin Special Berlin: Hostage for the West (1962), were heavily marked by the Cold War concerns of the day. Our German Cousins: Anglo-German relations in the 19th and 20th Centuries (1974) reflected more the development of European integration and the respective historical tensions and links between Britain and Germany.

Following an Encounter sponsored trip to Latin America in the late 1960s, he also published Static Society: the Paradox of Latin America, in 1969.

Mander was part of the centre right Anglo-American cold war consensus that grouped around Encounter and similar magazines. In 1961 he published The Writer and Commitment, looking at changing forms of commitment on the Left. These issues were also discussed in another Penguin Special Great Britain or Little England, 1963, in part also prompted by the issue of whether Britain should 'join Europe' in the then form of the European Community. Mander was also active as part of this informal grouping in supporting oppressed writers and intellectuals in the former Soviet bloc and Yugoslavia.

With his first wife, Necke Brache, Mander also translated three books from German: Klaus Roehler's, The Dignity of Night, Carl Zuckmayer's Carnival Confession and, most important in terms of its wider impact, Georg Lukacs's, The Meaning of Contemporary Realism.

His poetry was printed in some magazines such as the New Review and in two collected volumes in limited editions.

== Writings ==
=== Books ===
- John Mander, Berlin : The Eagle and the Bear, London: Barrie and Rockliff, 1959. (Republished Greenwood Pub Group, 1979.) ISBN 0313212090 ISBN 9780313212093 )
- John Mander, The Writer and Commitment, London: Secker and Warburg, 1961.
- John Mander, Great Britain or Little England?, Harmondsworth, Middlesex: Penguin Special, 1963; US ed., Boston, Mass: Houghton Mifflin Co., 1964.
- John Mander, Berlin: Hostage for the West, Harmondsworth, Middlesex: Penguin Special, 1962; US ed., Boston, Mass: Houghton Mifflin Co., 1964.
- John Mander, Static Society: The Paradox of Latin America, London: Victor Gollancz, 1969; US ed., The Unrevolutionary Society: The Power of Latin American Conservatism in a Changing World, New York: Knopf, 1969; Harper & Row, 1971.
- John Mander, Our German Cousins: Anglo-German Relations in the 19th and 20th Centuries, London: John Murray, 1974; (ISBN 9780719528941) US ed., Albuquerque, NM: Transatlantic Arts, 1975.

=== Poetry ===
- Dannant, R J; Mander, John; Silver, Harold; and Strickland, G R, Six Poems, The English Club, Cambridge, 1950.
- John Mander, Elegiacs, Stellar Press, Hatfield, UK:, 1972. (Limited edition of 100.)
- John Mander, A Calvary, 1978.

== Translations ==
- Klaus Roehler, [Die Würde der Nacht.] The Dignity of Night, Translated by John and Necke Mander. London : Barrie & Rockliff, [1960]
- Carl Zuckmayer, [Die Fastuachtsbeichte.] Carnival Confession. Translated by John and Necke Mander, Methuen & Co.: London, 1961
- George Lukacs, The Meaning of Contemporary Realism, Translated by John & Necke Mander (London: Merlin Press 1963) Also republished in various editions as Realism in Our Time: Literature and the Class Struggle.

== See also ==
- Mander family

== Sources ==
- Nicholas Mander, Varnished Leaves: a biography of the Mander Family of Wolverhampton, 1750–1950 (Owlpen Press, 2004) ISBN 0-9546056-0-8 [contains detailed bibliography and account of his life]
- Times obituary, 8 September 1978
- unpublished autobiography in Wightwick Manor archives
