= Council for Independent Education =

CIFE is a professional association of English independent sixth-form colleges. It provides support to its member institutions and advice about GCE Advanced Level and university entrance to anyone who asks for it. CIFE's President is Alistair Cooke, Baron Lexden

== History ==
CIFE began in 1973, as the Conference for Independent Further Education. Independent Further Education was a catch-all term which described fee-paying institutions which, though they taught the final stages of a pre-university curriculum, did not include enough pupils younger than 16 to be classified as a school. In 1973 the Department for Education decided that it was no longer willing to inspect such ‘educational establishments’, leaving that sector of education provision unchecked.

CIFE was founded by a group of colleges which felt that some form of inspection was essential to provide help to the public in choosing safely and avoiding rogues. In the absence of ‘official’ inspection CIFE set up its own independent inspectorate to visit member colleges, to promote best practice and to deal with any failings. CIFE retained its own inspectorate until the British Accreditation Council was founded in 1984, with assistance from the Nuffield Foundation. The BAC provided a comprehensive inspection scheme for all types of independent college, whether they prepared students for university entrance or for more vocational courses.

Since 1984 CIFE's role has emphasised the provision of professional support to its member colleges, particularly in collective marketing, and in providing an advice service to the public to help with questions about courses, university entrance etc.

== Founding colleges ==
The founding members of CIFE were a diverse group of colleges. Some, like Davies Laing and Dick, were London-based ‘crammers’, direct descendants of old-fashioned colleges which emphasised no-frills exam preparation, while others, like Stake Farm and Kirby Lodge, were small boarding schools which placed more emphasis on ‘finishing’ than on exam results. What they all had in common was an emphasis on small-group teaching of students aged 16 or more. Those first CIFE members were:

- Pax Hill Education Centre
- Stafford House Tutorial College
- Birmingham Tutorial College
- Kirby Lodge
- Greylands
- St Clare's Hall
- Basil Paterson College
- Concord College
- Modern Tutorial College (now Bales College)
- Davies's Hove
- Davies's London
- Cambridge Tutors (now Cambridge Tutors College)
- Davies Laing and Dick (now DLD College)
- Queen's Gate Palace Tutors
- Padworth
- Wood Tutorial College

Since that time the face of Further education has changed considerably. Exams are different, and university entrance is an almost universal aim rather than the reserve of the very academic. Regulation, though providing a safeguard against incompetent practice, has made it less easy for small innovative colleges to survive, and a number of those early members have disappeared (Kirby Lodge, Greylands College for instance). Over the past 25 years new colleges have started and old ones have diversified. Some such as Concord and Padworth have become mainstream schools, and others have specialised (for instance St Clare's which now teaches IB courses, and Basil Paterson which is now an EFL college). Bales and Cambridge Tutors are still CIFE members. Stafford House is now known as CATS Canterbury and now teaches IB as well as A level and has won awards from the TES and Independent Schools Association (see ISA and TES websites).

The ‘finishing school’ has gone, and ‘cramming’ evolved into a ‘liberal’ small group teaching format with an emphasis on individual attention and exam technique which has proved both attractive and successful not just within CIFE colleges but in a much wider range of schools: sixth-form teaching in most independent schools is now much closer to the CIFE-college model than was the case in the 1970s and '80s. Crammers became tutorial colleges and now ‘independent sixth-form colleges’.

CIFE colleges have also been pathfinders in opening up overseas markets with courses tailored towards university entrance. The recruitment of pre-university students from Malaysia, Vietnam and China was pioneered by CIFE colleges.

== Current nature of CIFE colleges ==
Some colleges now cater primarily for students from abroad while others deal mainly with British citizens. Some have several hundred students, some fewer than 50. Some are primarily residential while others deal mostly with ‘day’ students. Some remain colleges which primarily prepare for exams but others provide a more complete environment for development. All teach in small groups with an emphasis on adapting to the individual rather than requiring conformity to a school ethos.

== Distinctive nature of independent sixth-form colleges ==
Although mainstream independent schools have become more flexible and student-centred over the years, independent sixth-form colleges retain a range of distinctive qualities:

- Because most of their students are 16+, their staff have special expertise in sixth-form teaching and exam preparation
- They generally offer a wide range of subjects – over 30 A levels is very common, and they offer timetables with few (if any) restrictions on subject combinations
- Most offer specialist courses in addition to A-levels over two years:
  - one-year A-level and GCSE,
  - exam retake,
  - final-year A-level,
  - university foundation
  - Easter revision
  - English as second language
- Students tend to be treated as young adults rather than children

== Inspection ==
The Department of Education eventually resumed inspection of independent sixth-form colleges in 2004. It is currently a requirement of membership that CIFE colleges undergo regular inspection by the BAC, or Ofsted or the Independent Schools Inspectorate

== Current CIFE members ==
In July 2020 the following were CIFE members

- Ashbourne College
- Bath Academy
- Bales College
- Bosworth Independent College
- Brooke House College
- Cambridge Tutors College
- Carfax College, Oxford
- CATS College London
- CATS College Cambridge
- CATS College Canterbury
- Cherwell College Oxford
- Collingham College
- David Game College
- LSI College
- MPW Birmingham
- MPW Cambridge
- MPW London
- Oxford International College
- Oxford Sixth-form College (was Oxford Tutorial College)
- Padworth College
- Regent College
- Rochester Independent College
- Westminster Tutors
