= David Game College =

Coordinates: 51°30′47″N 0°04′35″W

- 31 Jewry Street, London EC3N 2ET; United Kingdom

Information
- Type: Private School & College
- Established: 1974
- Department for Education URN: 100544 Tables
- Ofsted: Reports
- Principal: David Game MA (Oxon), MPhil (Lond)
- Gender: Mixed
- Age: 14 to 22
- Affiliations: David Game College Group
- Website: www.davidgamecollege.com

David Game College is a private school and sixth form based in Aldgate, London. The college is coeducational day and boarding college and admits students between the ages of 14 and 22. Up to 400 students take full-time courses each year.

The college is associated with the CIFE group of independent colleges. 67% of A Level graduates gained entry to Russell Group universities in 2017–2018. David Game College is rated as Outstanding in all areas in its latest Ofsted inspection. A*-A A Level grades in 2024 were 29.00%, and A*-A grades at GCSE level were 30.00%.

In 2022 the college started providing boarding facilities, having acquired space in purpose-built student accommodation next to the college's main teaching building.

== History ==
The college was founded by its still current principal David Game in 1974. The college was originally started with five rooms in a basement; today it is one of the largest independent colleges in the UK. The college has undergone a multi-million pound renovation move to Tower Hill in May 2017. The college's current premises at 31 Jewry Street was previously occupied by London Guildhall and Metropolitan universities, and contains a Roman Wall in the basement.

== Courses of study ==
The college offers a number of educational courses including: A Levels, GCSEs, University Foundation Programmes, Higher Education, Easter Revision and Private Tuition as well as English, Russian and Spanish Foreign Language Courses.

=== Retake programmes ===
David Game College offers one-year intensive retake programmes for both GCSE and A Level students, designed to improve examination outcomes within a condensed timeframe.

=== Sabrewing adaptive learning programme ===
In 2024, David Game College launched the Sabrewing Programme, an AI-enabled adaptive learning system that in some cases replaces traditional teaching for selected resit students. The system assesses students’ knowledge gaps to generate personalised learning pathways and functions as a form of virtual tutor.

== Accreditation ==
The college is inspected by Ofsted, the Government body responsible for monitoring standards in education. In its most recent inspection the teaching, pupil's achievements and behaviour was described as Outstanding in all five areas in its latest inspection. From 2023, the College became a member of the Independent Schools Association (ISA) and all future inspections will be covered by the Independent Schools Inspectorate(ISI).

The college has also been awarded Tier 4 Sponsor status by the UK Visas and Immigration (UKVI).
