= Carfax College =

Carfax College, Oxford

Location
- 38 Binsey Lane; Oxford, OX2 0EY; England; 51.753423°N 1.266121°W

Information
- Former name: Carfax Tutorial Establishment
- Type: Private day school Private boarding school Independent Sixth Form College; Tutorial College
- Motto: Everything is possible
- Established: 2008
- Founder: Alexander Nikitich
- Local authority: Oxfordshire
- Department for Education URN: 139997 Tables
- Principal: Alexander Nikitich
- Gender: Co-educational
- Age: 11 to 21
- Enrolment: ~45
- Colour: Oxford blue
- Website: http://www.carfax-oxford.com/

Carfax College, previously known as Carfax Tutorial Establishment is a registered independent school in England, specializing in providing one-to-one and very-small-group tuition in all academic subjects to pupils of all ages. It is an examination centre for all of the major British examination boards. Carfax College is a part of the Carfax Education Group.

== Inspections and Accreditations ==
It was rated as 'exceeding expectations' in every category by the Independent Schools Inspectorate following an inspection the PFE scheme in 2012. In 2014 it underwent a maiden inspection by Ofsted and was rated 'good'. Carfax College is a member of the Council for Independent Education. In 2011 it became one of the co-founders of the Oxford Consortium of Independent Tutorial Colleges.

== Media Attention ==
In August 2014 Carfax College attracted attention of the national media in the UK by becoming the first independent school in the UK to charge lower tuition fees for British and European pupils than for overseas pupils.
