= Mander Portman Woodward =

Coordinates: 52.195495°N 0.123033°E

- London, Birmingham, Cambridge; United Kingdom

Information
- Type: Private school
- Denomination: None
- Established: 1973
- Founder: Robert Woodward, Rodney Portman & Sir Nicholas Mander, 4th Baronet
- Principal: Sally Powell (MPW London) * Mark Shingleton (MPW Birmingham); Ann Meisner (MPW Cambridge)
- Gender: Mixed
- Age: 14 to 18+
- Website: www.mpw.ac.uk

Mander Portman Woodward is a group of British private schools, with branches in London, Birmingham and Cambridge, offering GCSE and A-Level courses.

Originally known as a cram school, MPW is also an option for full courses. The majority of students take two-year A-level courses. The chairman of the Governors is Steve Boyes. The CEO of the company is Spencer Coles, the former chief operating officer of Regent's University London.

== History ==
The school was formed in its current structure in 1973 by Robert Woodward, Rodney Portman and Nicholas Mander with the aim of applying University of Cambridge-style tutorial teaching to school age students. MPW teaches in small groups (fewer than 10 students per class). Mander Portman Woodward also offers Easter Revision courses for GCSE, AS and A level students from other schools. The London and Birmingham colleges are part of the Council for Independent Education (CIFE) group. MPW produce a range of books including 'Getting into...' guides, 'How to complete UCAS' and 'A-Z of surviving exams'.

== Results and destinations ==
At each MPW college in 2020 the most commonly achieved (modal) A level grade was A/A* and over 50% of examination entries were at this level.

The colleges are also successful in terms of value-add, which measures the distance travelled by students at A level relative to where they were at GCSE, and in their improvement of retake student grades, as reported by the Times. and Sunday Times.

In 2023, 35.6% of students at MPW London scored A*-A for A Levels. In the same year (2023), 24.6% of students at MPW Birmingham scored A*-A for A Levels. MPW Birmingham's 2023 A-Level grades were below the national average, in which 26.5% of students achieved an A*-A across England.

== Curriculum ==
The majority of students take A level courses. A small cohort each year take GCSE/IGCSE courses. One-year university foundation programmes are available for international students. The AQA Extended Project Qualification (EPQ) is available to students wishing to take this alongside their other studies usually in year 12.

Full A level and GCSE courses are taught over two years, 18 months or an intensive one-year short course. An increasing number of students also join MPW at the end of year 12 either to complete the courses that they have started at their previous schools or to begin a new set of subjects. There are 43 subjects available and no timetable restrictions.

== Co-curricular ==
Extra-curricular provision is available at all three colleges. Sport is popular; other options include charity fund-raising, student council and Duke of Edinburgh award.

== Easter Revision ==
Easter Revision courses are taught in London, Birmingham and Cambridge for three weeks in March/April; MPW's status as a revision course provider was described by the Daily Telegraph as "quasi-legendary". Current students attend the courses, which are also available to external students; over 1600 join the colleges each year for Easter Revision. The courses are designed to prepare students for GCSE, AS and A level examinations the following summer.

== London ==
The college is in South Kensington on the road of Queen's Gate. It occupies three Georgian townhouses. The Good Schools Guide said that the school is "a positive, professional place with strong teaching and outstanding pastoral care".

== Birmingham ==
The Birmingham college is located in Edgbaston, not far from the University of Birmingham, and was opened in 1980. The college is fully co-educational and prepares students for GCSE, A level and entrance for Oxbridge, medical school and dental school. There are fewer than 10 students in a class and a college roll of 240 students. The principal is Mark Shingleton, who has been in post since 2009.

The college's students have won the Council for Independent Education (CIFE) Value Added Award numerous times for most improved student academic performance and won prizes for outstanding performances in the areas of mathematics, social science and humanities.

Ofsted inspection reports: "The college's most recent inspection has the college rated at Ofsted's maximum rating of 'Outstanding' across all assessment areas."

== Cambridge ==
The Mander Portman Woodward college in Cambridge is on Brookside, just off Trumpington Road, a few minutes' walk from the centre of Cambridge. Established in 1987, it is a co-educational GCSE and A level college. Its most recent Ofsted inspection report has the college scoring Ofsted's maximum rating of Outstanding in all assessment areas.

== Notable alumni ==
- Adrian Butchart, screenwriter and producer
- Sebastian Croft, actor and singer
- Lama Hasan, journalist
- John Jayne, judoka
- Eliza Nicholson, runner
- Phoebe Plummer, climate activist
- Suzanne Virdee, journalist
