= Charles Arthur Mander =

Sir Charles Arthur Mander, 2nd Baronet
- Born: 25 June 1884; Newbridge, Wolverhampton, Staffordshire, England
- Died: 25 January 1951 (aged 66); QVNI, Wolverhampton, Staffordshire, England
- Resting place: ashes scattered at Kilsall
- Education: Eton College
- Alma mater: Trinity College, Cambridge
- Occupations: public servant, industrialist, philanthropist, cavalry officer
- Employer: Mander Brothers
- Known for: Midland public figure
- Title: baronet
- Predecessor: Sir Charles Tertius Mander, 1st baronet
- Successor: Sir Charles Marcus Mander, 3rd baronet
- Political party: Conservative
- Spouse: Monica Claire Cotterill Neame
- Children: Marietta Patience Mander; Carinthia Jill Mander; Charles Marcus Mander
- Relatives: Geoffrey Mander, Miles Mander, first and second cousins

Sir Charles Arthur Mander, 2nd Baronet JP, DL, TD (25 June 1884 – 25 January 1951) was a public servant, philanthropist, and manufacturer, as managing director of Mander Brothers, the family paint, varnish and inks business established in 1773.

== Early life ==
Charles Arthur Mander, of Kilsall Hall, Tong, Shropshire, was the elder son of Charles Tertius Mander, first baronet, by Mary Le Mesurier, daughter of Henry Nicholas Paint, a Member of the Dominion Parliament of Canada. He was educated at Hillbrow School in Rugby, Eton College and Trinity College, Cambridge, where he read Natural Sciences. He shot in the English rifle team, and was in the winning eight for the Elcho Shield while still at Cambridge.

He served as a major in the Staffordshire Yeomanry (Queen's Own Royal Regiment) in World War I, attached to the Yeomanry Mounted Division in the Sinai and Palestine Campaign. He was wounded in the Third Battle of Gaza at Beersheba in 1917, and following the decisive battle of Megiddo, was one of the first to enter Damascus in triumph with General Allenby. Extracts from his lively journals describing one of the last great cavalry campaigns were published in Varnished Leaves (2004).

== Public life ==
He was one of the best known public men of his generation in the Midlands. After the war, he entered local government, standing as a Conservative member of Wolverhampton Council for 25 years, serving twice as Mayor of Wolverhampton in 1932-1933 and again in the Coronation year, 1936–1937. He promoted many social service, educational and welfare organisations, founding the Good Companions youth club at Horseley Fields. He was chairman of the Borough finance committee for a generation, an alderman, and was awarded the honorary freedom of the borough. A keen sportsman, he became President of Wolverhampton Wanderers Football Club and was also a governor and trustee of The Royal School, Wolverhampton.

He served on over 65 committees and organisations at one time, was in demand as a public speaker on both sides of the Atlantic, chairing some of the first radio discussion programmes, notably 'Midland Parliament'. Among many positions, he was Chairman of the Industrial Advisory Council, Vice-chairman of the National Savings Committee, President of Rotary International for Britain and Ireland and President of the National Federation of Associated Paint, Colour and Varnish Manufacturers of the United Kingdom (1930-1). In the US, he was adopted as Chief Red Crow, an honorary title of the Blackfoot nation in Montana, where he was to give the dedication address of the Waterton-Glacier International Peace Park, the first national park to be dedicated to world peace, on 18 June 1932. In 1949 he caused a furore when he resigned from the presidency of the local Conservative party because he disagreed with post-war housing policy, in particular the town council's direct labour scheme for council housing.

== Business career ==
He was an active industrialist, managing director of Mander Brothers when it was a progressive company in social reform, welfare matters and labour relations, and among many initiatives was the first company in Britain to introduce the 40-hour week through an historic agreement signed and mediated by Ernest Bevin, general secretary of the Transport and General Workers' Union, in September 1932. He succeeded his father as a director and then chairman of the prominent Queen Square Syndicate in Wolverhampton.

== Family ==
He married in 1913 Monica, daughter of George Harding Neame, of Kent and London, by whom he had three children.

He died suddenly in 1951, aged 66, when he was succeeded in the baronetcy by his only son, Charles Marcus Mander (1921–2006). There is a blue plaque commemorating his contribution to the city of Wolverhampton on the front of the Magistrates’ Courts.

== See also ==
- Mander family
- Mander Baronets
- Mander Brothers

== Sources ==
- Sir Geoffrey Le Mesurier Mander (ed), The History of Mander Brothers (Wolverhampton, n.d. [1955]). Contains biographical chapter.
- Nicholas Mander, Varnished Leaves: a biography of the Mander Family of Wolverhampton, 1750-1950 (Owlpen Press, 2004)
- Mosley, Charles, editor, Burke's Peerage, Baronetage & Knightage, 107th edition, 3 volumes (Burke's Peerage (Genealogical Books) Ltd, 2003), volume 2, page 2589, sub Mander baronetcy of the Mount [U.K.], cr. 1911.
- ‘Quaestor’ (W. Byford-Jones), I Met them in the Midlands, Midland News Assn., 1937, pp. 42–7. Contains biographical chapter, with portrait by A. Arrowsmith, pp. 42–7.
- Woods, Edward Sydney, Lord Bishop of Lichfield, Address delivered at the Memorial Service … for Charles Arthur Mander, second baronet, Curwen Press [privately printed], 1952.
- Debrett, John, C. F. J. Hankinson, and Arthur G. M. Hesilrige. Debretts peerage, baronetage, knightage, and companionage ...: comprises information concerning persons bearing hereditary or courtesy titles, privy councillors, knights, companions of the various orders, and the collateral branches of all peers and baronets. London: Odhams Press, 1947.
- Times obituary, 26 January 1951, page 8

Baronetage of the United Kingdom
Preceded by Charles Tertius Mander	Baronet (of The Mount); 1929–1951	Succeeded by Charles Marcus Mander
Political offices
Preceded by Joseph Haddock	Mayor of Wolverhampton; November 1932–1933	Succeeded by Bertram Kidson
Preceded by James Whittaker	Mayor of Wolverhampton; November 1936–1937	Succeeded by Richard Ernest Probert
