= Wightwick Manor =

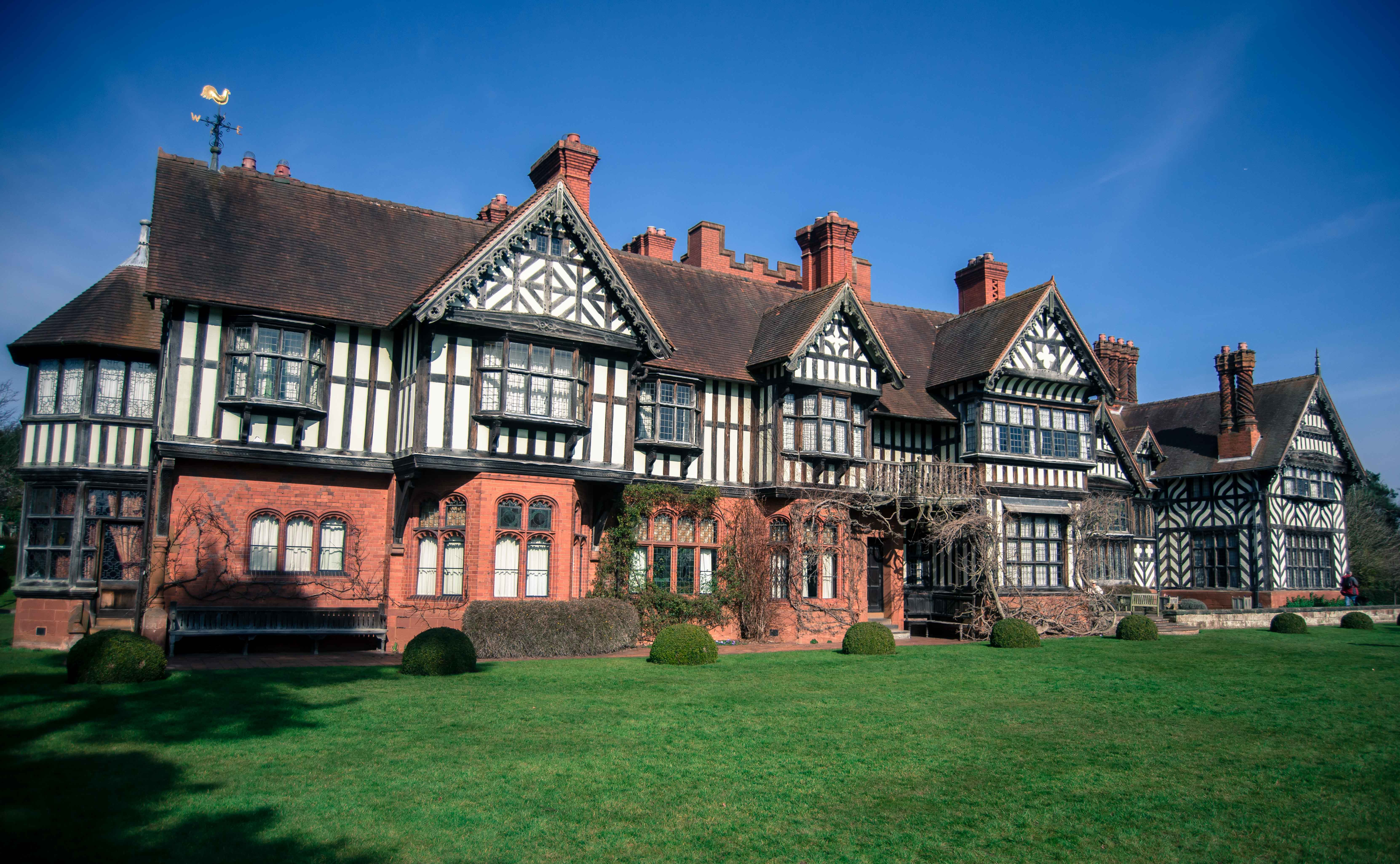
- Wightwick Manor, 2016

- Location within West Midlands county
- 52°35′00″N 2°11′40″W
- Location: Wightwick Bank
- OS grid reference: SO 86946 98441

History
- Built: 1887–1893

Site notes
- Area: Wolverhampton
- Architect: Edward Ould
- Architectural styles: "Old English" Tudor Revival; Arts and Crafts
- Owner: National Trust

Listed Building – Grade I
- Reference no.: 1201902

National Register of Historic Parks and Gardens
- Reference no.: 1001421

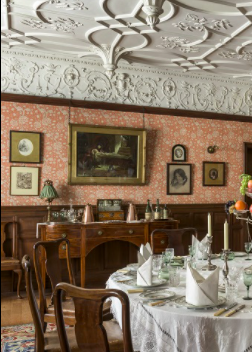
Leonard Shuffrey's dining room plaster frieze and strap-work ceiling at Wightwick Manor

Wightwick Manor (/ˈwɪtɪk/ WIT-ik) is a Victorian house in Wightwick Bank, a suburb of Wolverhampton, West Midlands, England. It was commissioned in 1887 from the architect Edward Ould by Theodore Mander of Mander Brothers, a Wolverhampton paint and varnish manufacturer. It stands adjacent to the Old Manor, a late sixteenth or early seventeenth-century building that was the original residence on the site.

The house is significant as an example of a domestic building constructed, decorated, and furnished under the influence of the Aesthetic movement and Arts and Crafts movement. It contains many examples of the works of William Morris and his firm Morris & Co., including wall hangings, wallpapers, and upholstery; tiles designed by William De Morgan; and stained glass designed by Charles Kempe. It also contains Pre-Raphaelite works of art, including works by Dante Gabriel Rossetti, Evelyn De Morgan, Edward Burne-Jones, Ford Madox Brown, John Everett Millais, Elizabeth Siddal, and Leonard Shuffrey.

Much of the collection in the house was assembled by Sir Geoffrey and Lady Rosalind Mander, who inherited it in 1900. They gave the house and grounds to the National Trust in 1937, but continued adding to the contents until their deaths in 1962 and 1988 respectively. The property is open to the public, although the Mander family retain the use of an apartment. The Old Manor houses the De Morgan Gallery, an exhibition of the works of Evelyn and William De Morgan.

== History ==
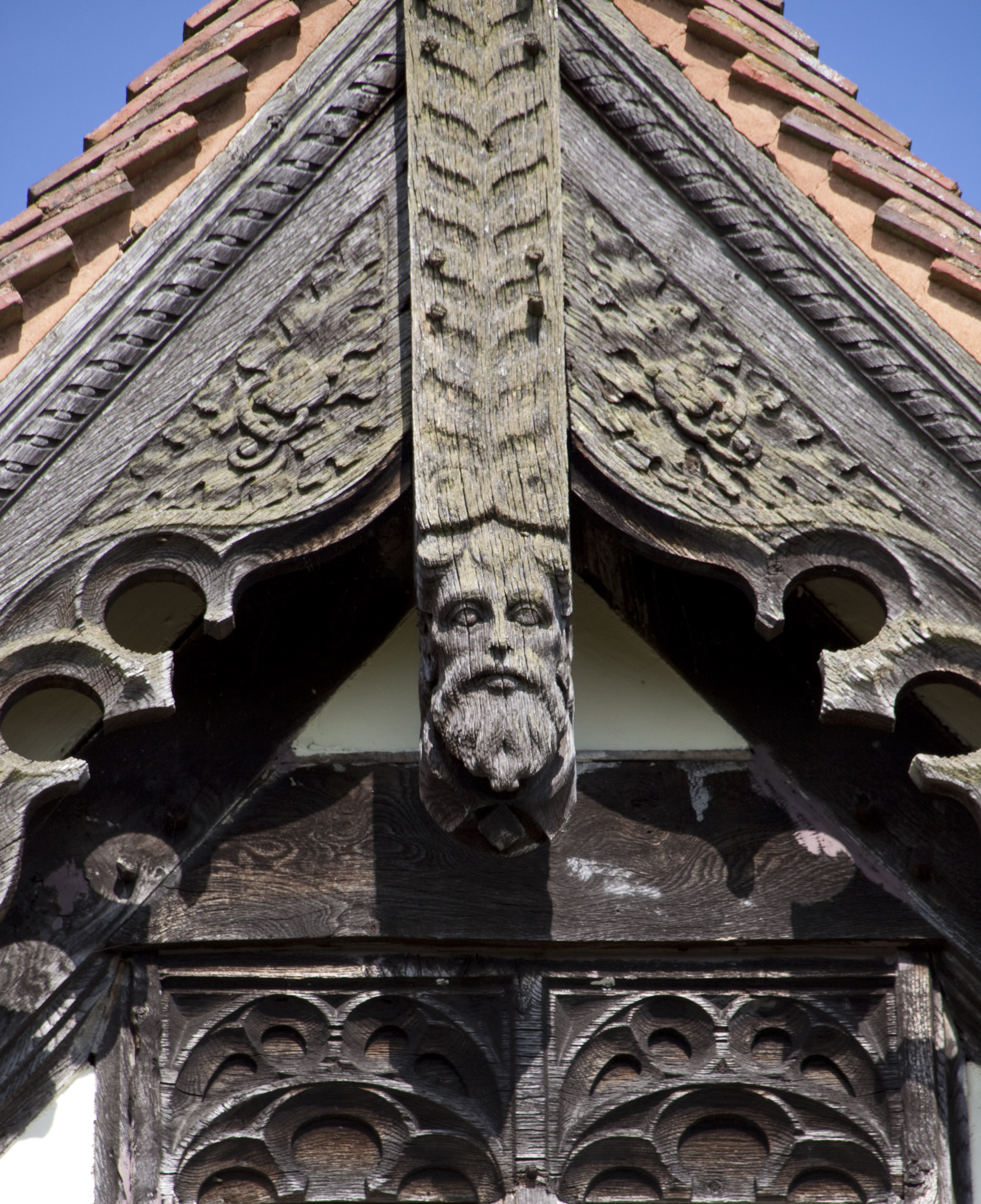
Detail

The oldest building on the site is the Old Manor, which incorporates elements of a medieval house and which was built in two stages around the turn of the seventeenth century by Francis Wightwick and his son, Alexander. The Wightwick family took their name from the estate and owned it from at least the thirteenth century until 1815, when it was sold to the Hinkes family. In 1887 it was sold again to (Samuel) Theodore Mander.

The Mander family became established in Wolverhampton in the mid-eighteenth century, when Thomas Mander moved to the town from Warwickshire. His son, Benjamin Mander, established a japanning and tinplate works in 1773, which became Mander Brothers and expanded into the manufacture of paints under his grandsons, Charles and Samuel Mander. Their sons, Charles and Theodore respectively, became company directors in 1879. In the same year, Theodore married Flora, the daughter of Henry Nicholas Paint, a merchant and member of the Parliament of Canada.

After purchasing Wightwick, Theodore commissioned Edward Ould of Liverpool to design a new house. This was completed in 1887, and consisted of the western half of the present house and a single-storey west wing containing a billiard room and a three-room Victorian Turkish bath. Notes taken by Theodore Mander at a lecture given in Wolverhampton in 1884 by Oscar Wilde on the 'House Beautiful' inspired Wightwick's interiors. Taking inspiration from this lecture, Theodore and his wife Flora decorated its interiors with the designs of William Morris and his Arts and Crafts contemporaries. However, the Pre-Raphaelite collection was mostly assembled after the house was donated to the National Trust, particularly by Geoffrey Mander and his second wife, Rosalie, who was an art historian.

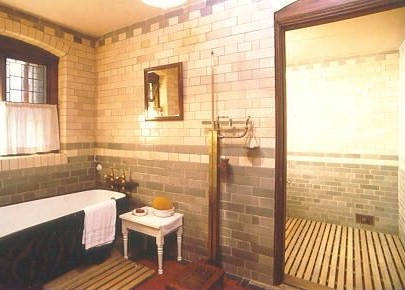
Wightwick Manor Victorian Turkish bath cooling-room, with view to hot room (Note: The inclusion by the National Trust of the bath in the near room follows original and later plans of the room. But it would have been extremely unlikely for a Victorian Turkish bath to have a slipper bath so close to the hot room because the necessary dry air would become increasingly humid and steamy. Modern investigation has shown no sign of water inlet pipes or of a waste water outlet ever having been plumbed in.)

The house had no guest bedrooms and proved too small by 1893, when the billiard room and one of the Turkish bath rooms were demolished and a new east wing built. (Note: This reduced size Turkish bath still exists, one of only two such baths remaining. The other is in Cragside, Lord Armstrong's home in Rothbury, also owned by the National Trust.) This approximately doubled the size of the building, and, as well as five guest bedrooms, contained a living-room called the 'great parlour', a dining room, and a replacement billiard room. The elaborate pendant imitation Jacobean plaster ceiling in the dining room was designed by Leonard Shuffrey.

In 1937, Geoffrey Mander, a radical Liberal MP and local paint manufacturer who had been left the timber-framed house by his father Theodore, persuaded the National Trust to accept a house that was just 50 years old, under the Country Houses Scheme Act.

This house of the Aesthetic Movement was, by 1937, a relic of an out of fashion era. Yet, so complete was the design that it was worthy of preservation. Having given the house to the Trust, Geoffrey Mander and his second wife, Rosalie, became its live-in curators, opening the house to the public and adding to its contents. In particular, they added a notable collection of Pre-Raphaelite paintings by Rossetti, Burne-Jones and their followers. Descendants of the family retain a private apartment in the manor.

== House, art collection and gardens ==
The Manor has the work of 13 professional female artists on permanent public display, more than any other in the National Trust, including notable examples of works by Lizzie Siddal, Lucy Madox Brown, Marie Spartali Stillman, and May Morris. Most of these artworks were collected by the Manders. The malthouse gallery now houses a group of works by Evelyn De Morgan and her husband William, on loan from the De Morgan Foundation.

The house has 17 acres of woodland and gardens, and the outbuildings include parts of an earlier Jacobean manor house, stables (now a tea room), a gallery in the old malt house, gift shop, and a second-hand bookshop.

It is situated just off the main A454 Wolverhampton to Bridgnorth road, approximately three miles to the west of the city centre.

The manor has been Grade I listed on the National Heritage List for England since July 1950, and its gardens are Grade II listed on the Register of Historic Parks and Gardens.

== See also ==
- List of works by Grayson and Ould
- Treasure Houses of Britain
