= Manders =

Manders is a Dutch and Flemish surname. The most plausible explanation is a genitive derivation from 'mander' meaning "basket maker".Another possibility is a truncation of a patronymic, such as Manhardszoon. Notable people with the surname include:

- Adrian Manders (1912–1967), American politician
- Arnold Manders (born 1959), Bermudian cricketer
- Bernardus Manders (born 1962), Dutch actor
- Clarence Pug Manders (1913–1985), American football player
- Dave Manders (born 1941), American football player
- Hal Manders (1917–2010), American baseball pitcher
- Henri Manders (born 1960), Dutch road bicycle racer
- Henry Manders (1825–1891), New Zealand politician
- Jack Manders (1909–1977), American football player
- John E. Manders (1895–1973), Mayor of Anchorage, Alaska
- Henry Manders (died 1891), New Zealand Member of Parliament
- Mark Manders (born 1968), Dutch artist
- Taurean Manders (born 1986), Bermudian footballer
- Toine Manders (born 1956), Dutch politician
- Tom Manders (Dutch artist) (1921–1972), Dutch artist, comedian and cabaret performer

== Fictional characters ==
- Bunny Manders, in the Raffles novels of E. W. Hornung
- Parson Manders, in the Ibsen play Ghosts

== See also ==
- Mander (surname)
- Methyl cyanoformate, also known as Mander's reagent, used in organic chemistry
