= Mander Centre =

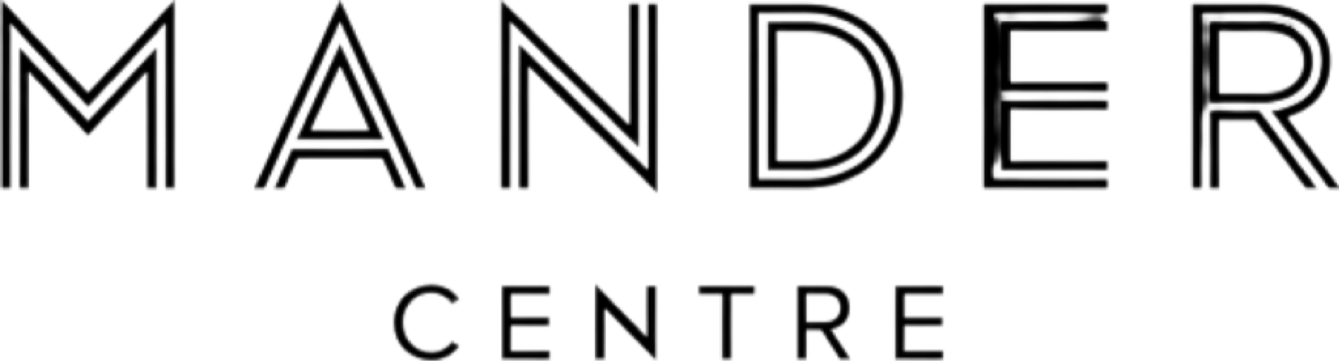
- Location: Wolverhampton, England
- Coordinates: 52.585°N 2.128°W
- Opened: 6 March 1968, refurbished 1987, 2003 & 2016-17
- Developer: Manders Holdings Plc
- Manager: Richard Scharenguivel (Centre Manager), MAPP
- Owner: Catella APAM (since 2023)
- Architect: Stanley Sellers
- Num. of stores: 70
- Num. of anchor tenants: 3: Frasers, H&M, Matalan
- Floor area: 620,000 sq ft (58,000 m^{2})
- Floors: 2 (department store 3 floors)
- Parking: 530 space multi-storey car park
- Website: www.mandercentre.co.uk

The Mander Centre is a major shopping centre in Wolverhampton City Centre, in Wolverhampton, England, developed by Manders Holdings Plc, the paint, inks and property conglomerate, between 1968 and 1974. The site occupies four and a half acres comprising the old Georgian works and offices of the Mander family firm, founded in 1773, as well as the site of the former Queens Arcade (promoted privately by Charles Tertius Mander), which had stood on the site since 1902.

When the main part of the Mander Centre opened in 1968, the Central Arcade retained its Edwardian architecture and was refurbished as the main entrance to the Mander Centre from Dudley Street.

In May 1974 the Central Arcade was destroyed by a severe fire that reduced it to rubble, which was declared unsafe and was subsequently demolished. The area was later rebuilt as the entrance to the centre.

== Recent history ==
=== 1987 to 2016 ===
The centre was refurbished in 1987, when it was described as "a covered pedestrianised shopping complex at the centre of the principal shopping area of Wolverhampton" with more than 150 shops.

In 2003 the centre embarked on a further multi-million pound refurbishment programme. It was an opportunity to complete the enclosure of the centre to make it fully climate controlled. The marble floor in the entire centre was replaced along with the relocation of the escalators and stairways. The biggest change was the creation of the large New Look store which took over numerous stores.

In 2010 the Mander Centre was acquired by Delancey Estates and Royal Bank of Scotland from Manders Holdings Plc and its successor companies. In the spring of 2014 this led to heated national controversy when they proceeded to remove a landmark bronze sculpture, Rock Form (Porthcurno), by Barbara Hepworth, specially commissioned for the site and donated by the Mander family and shareholders in 1968. Its sudden disappearance led to questions in Parliament in September 2014. Paul Uppal, Member of Parliament for Wolverhampton South West said: "When the Rock Form was donated by the Mander family, it was done so in the belief it would be enjoyed and cherished by the people of Wolverhampton for generations… It belongs to, and should be enjoyed by, the City of Wolverhampton."

In 2011 Delancey announced that they would invest £25 million in the Mander Centre, completing a major refurbishment and reconfiguration of the centre and creating a new 90,000 sq ft department store. On 4 December it was announced that the Mander Centre had been acquired by Benson Elliot Capital Management for £59 million, and that the £35 million investment was still going ahead. It was also announced that TJ Hughes store and Tesco would be demolished to make way for the new 93,000 sq ft Debenhams Store over three floors, the opening of which would confirm the completion of the redevelopment in the autumn of 2017.

Throughout 2016 and 2017, the centre was refurbished and configured as part of the £25 million investment, and a series of new larger stores was created, forcing some stores to close down and relocate within the centre. WH Smith and Tesco were closed, and Superdrug relocated. The reconfiguration was also to include new escalators and lifts, the removal of the Lower Central Arcade and the relocation of the toilets.

On 18 November 2016 H&M was the first major store to open as part of the shopping centre's multimillion-pound redevelopment. It is 31,000 square feet in area, is the first store in the West Midlands to include a homeware department, and is located in the store formerly occupied by Woolworths.

=== 2017 to 2019 ===
Having previously moved to a temporary store Superdrug opened a new store on 2 May 2017. It occupies the former WH Smith store, and marks the second new store opening since the beginning of the centre's refurbishment.

It was announced in September 2017 that Richard Scharenguivel had been appointed as Centre Manager, having previously been Deputy General Manager at the Bull Ring, Birmingham.

On 12 October 2017, Debenhams was officially opened, the second new store to be opened by Debenhams this year. It was also only the second in the UK to feature a new deli restaurant called Loaf & Bloom. The opening of Debenhams also signalled the end of the two-year refurbishment and reconfiguration. Debenhams asked for local people to nominate a local person to open the store, which created up to 150 jobs for the community.

In July 2018, M J Mapp were appointed by Benson Elliot to take on the daily management of the Mander Centre.

In April 2019, Debenhams announced, among other store closures, that less than two years after it opened, the Mander Centre store, which formed the centerpiece of the centre's refurbishment, would close in January 2020.

In July 2019 it was announced that the Starbucks coffee shop would close in August 2019, with no explanations from either Mander Centre or Starbucks.

In October 2019, it was announced that House of Fraser (Beatties) would vacate its current building in Wolverhampton city Centre and take up residence in the former Debenhams store when the store closed in January 2020. The new Frasers concept store will introduce a number of brands to the Mander Centre, with Sports Direct to take up the lower ground floor, Frasers to take up the first and second floors and Flannels on the first. Frasers were expected to occupy the building as soon as Debenhams vacate in January 2020.

=== 2020s ===
On 11 January 2020, the 93,000 sq ft Debenhams store, which had opened to much fanfare in 2017, closed in the Mander Centre. This is the first wave of store closures in an attempt to save the ailing department store. Frasers (House of Fraser) occupied the building from 12 April 2021, opening a brand new flagship store that introduced a number of brands to the Mander Centre. It is the first Frasers Group department store concept in the UK that combines Flannels, Sports Direct, Game, Evans Cycles and House of Fraser.

In October 2020, it was announced that the owner of the Mander Centre, Benson Elliot Capital Management was acquired by PineBridge Investments.

In 2023, the Mander Centre changed owners again and was acquired by Catella APAM, with the intention for further investment with a look at adding new leisure facilities and even a hotel in Mander House.

It was announced on 8 August 2024, that Catella APAM had agreed the lease for 17,000 sq ft of the Mander Centre down Victoria Arcade to Victoria Street to Superbowl UK. It is a mixed use venue with access from Victoria Street enabling the venue to remain open when the Mander Centre is closed. It's set to feature 12 Bowling Lanes, Crazy Club Soft Play area, interactive darts, a bar and diner and a Sega Prize Zone Arcade and is set to open in early 2025 on a fifteen year lease.

In October 2024 Catella APAM agreed a 10 year lease with TJ Hughes, following the closure of Wilko which entered administration. It saw TJ Hughes return to the centre 10 years after the former store closed, with the store opening on 28 October 2024. It saw a quick turn around of the store where the terms were only agreed at the beginning of October and the store opened on 28 October 2024.

== Sources ==
- Sir Geoffrey Le Mesurier Mander (ed), The History of Mander Brothers (Wolverhampton, n.d. [1955])
- C. Nicholas Mander, Varnished Leaves: a biography of the Mander Family of Wolverhampton, 1750-1950 (Owlpen Press, 2004)
