= Mander family =

British family involved in the industrial revolution

Blazon of Mander baronets

The Mander family has held for over 200 years a prominent position in the Midland counties of England, both in the family business and public life. In the early Industrial Revolution, the Mander family entered the vanguard of the expansion of Wolverhampton, on the edge of the largest manufacturing conurbation in the British Isles. Mander Brothers was a major employer in the city of Wolverhampton, a progressive company which became the Number One manufacturers of varnish, paint and later printing ink in the British Empire. The family became distinguished for public service, art patronage and philanthropy. Charles Tertius Mander (1852–1929) was created the first baronet of The Mount in the baronetage of the United Kingdom in the Coronation honours of George V, on 8 July 1911.

== Early history ==
The family were franklins, settled by 1291 at Tredington on the Warwickshire/Worcestershire borders of Midland England. The Wolverhampton family descends from Henry Mander (1601–72), of Aston Cantlow, whose son, Samuel Mander, migrated about 1695 to Lapworth Hall (also known as 'Irelands'), where the family remained for about 200 years. In 1742, his grandson Thomas Mander (1720–1764), a younger son, migrated a few miles north to Wolverhampton, then a market town of just 7,500 people. There he settled as a merchant, maltster and manufacturer, and in due course inherited property from the family of his wife, Elizabeth Clemson, in John Street, which today forms the core of the modern city.

== Mander baronetcy ==
Mander baronets
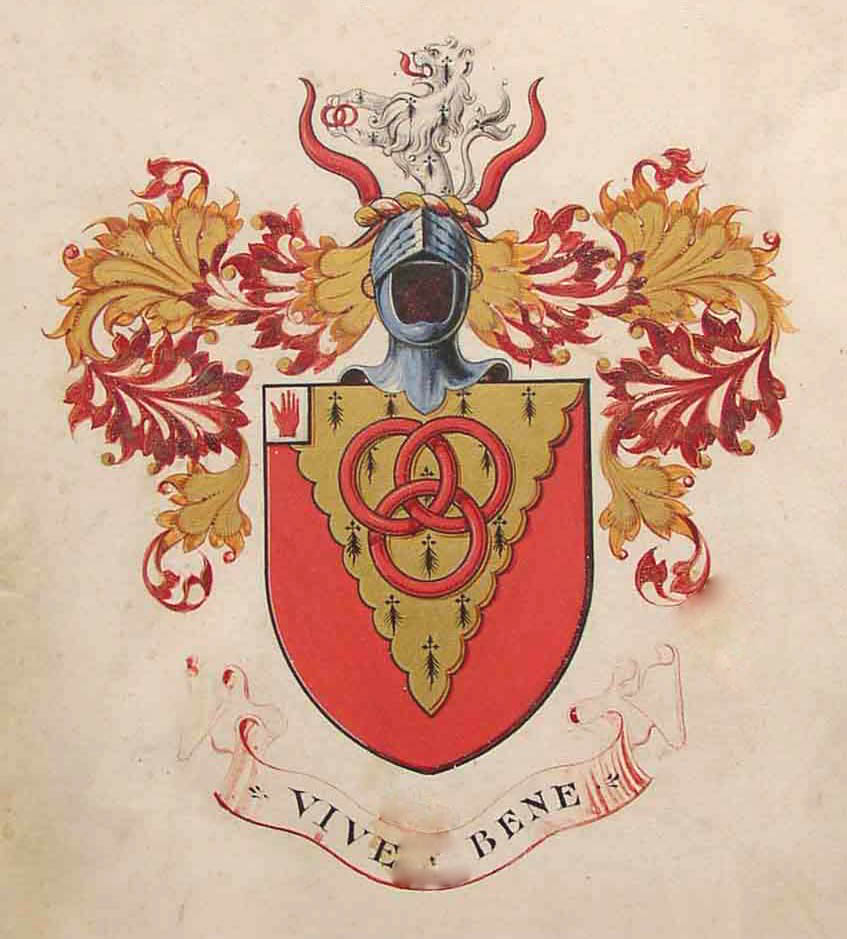
- Coat of arms of the Mander baronets of the Mount
- Creation date: 1911
- Status: extant
- Motto: Vive Bene, Live well
- Arms: Gules, on a pile invected erminois, three annulets interlaced, two and one of the field. Grant (Heraldic College, England), 30 May 1901
- Crest: On a wreath of the colours, a demi-lion couped ermine holding in the paws two annulets interlaced fessewise gules, between two buffalo horns of the last. Mantling gules and or, livery, blue, yellow facings, brass buttons

The Mander baronetcy, of The Mount, Tettenhall Wood, in the County of Staffordshire, was created in the Baronetage of the United Kingdom on 8 July 1911 in the Coronation honours of King George V, for Sir Charles Tertius Mander, English varnish and colour manufacturer (and as such Royal Warrant holder) and public servant.

== Family members ==
- Benjamin (1752–1819) and John Mander (1754–1827) were Thomas's sons. By 1773, they were setting up a cluster of loosely integrated businesses in Wolverhampton, including one of the largest chemical manufacturing works in the country, together with businesses in baking, japanning and tin-plate working, canals and gas manufacture. Benjamin Mander was chairman of the Wolverhampton Union Flour and Bread Company, a milling co-operative company set up for charitable purposes to provide subsidised bread and flour in the period of social distress following the Napoleonic Wars. The two brothers campaigned actively against the slave trade, founded chapels, libraries and schools, and entered into local politics as town commissioners, four Manders sitting at one time for the Georgian borough. A third brother, Thomas Mander, set up in the hardware trade, as a factor and gun and flintlock manufacturer of Five Ways, Birmingham; he was ancestor of the Sparrows, iron masters, of Albrighton Hall, Shrewsbury.

Hereafter, the eldest sons of the senior line of the family have been given the first name Charles:

- Charles Mander (1780–1853), the eldest son of Benjamin, founded a varnish works in 1803 which was to prosper though the 19th century. He was a penal reformer who campaigned against the Blood Money Act, successfully petitioning for its repeal in 1818. The romantic story of how he rescued two soldiers from the gallows accused of stealing just 1s.1d. became the subject of a novel by the jurist Samuel Warren, Now and Then (1848). He was a noted nonconformist, whose exertions for the tenure of endowments by a 23-year Chancery case led, with other similar cases, to the Dissenters' Chapels Act 1844.
- Charles Benjamin Mander JP (1819–1878) was the eldest son of Charles. He was the force behind the establishment of the first publicly funded institution for art education in Britain in 1852. As a town councillor, he campaigned for clean drinking water fountains, and for the free library in Wolverhampton. With the rise of the railways, he greatly expanded the business of Mander Brothers, forming a partnership with his brother Samuel in 1845. He is commemorated by a blue plaque at The Mount, Tettenhall Wood, the house he built after 1862 (now a hotel).
- Sir Charles Tertius Mander (16 July 1852 – 8 April 1929), JP, DL, TD, was the eldest son of Charles Benjamin Mander, of The Mount. Among many public offices, he was uniquely four times mayor of Wolverhampton from 1892 to 1896, an alderman, and an honorary freeman of the borough. He was a colonel in the Staffordshire Yeomanry and the first member of the family to serve as High Sheriff of Staffordshire. He was also an active philanthropist in many public causes. A progressive industrialist and manufacturer, he became the first chairman of Mander Brothers Ltd., the family paint and varnish works, and was involved in many other companies, including a Midland electrical company credited with the invention of the spark plug. He was created the first baronet of the Mount, Tettenhall Wood, in the baronetage of the United Kingdom for his public services on 8 July 1911.
- Sir Charles Arthur Mander (25 June 1884 – 25 January 1951), JP, DL, TD, the second baronet, was the elder son of Charles Tertius by Mary Le Mesurier Paint, daughter of Henry Nicholas Paint, a member of the Dominion Parliament of Canada, of Halifax, Nova Scotia. He was twice mayor of Wolverhampton, an honorary freeman of the borough, and served as High Sheriff of Staffordshire. He shot rifle for England while at Trinity College, Cambridge. In World War I he served as a major in the Staffordshire Yeomanry, attached to the Yeomanry Mounted Division, and fought in Egypt, Syria and Palestine. He was wounded in the Third Battle of Gaza at Beersheba in 1917 and, following the decisive Battle of Megiddo, entered Damascus with General Allenby. He was managing director of Mander Brothers Ltd. He served on over 65 committees and organisations at one time, was in demand as a public speaker, and presented or chaired early radio discussion programmes. He was vice-chairman of the National Savings Committee and President of Rotary International for Britain and Ireland. In the United States, he was made honorary chief Red Crow of the Blackfoot tribe in Montana when he gave the address at the dedication of the Waterton-Glacier International Peace Park in 1932.
- Sir Charles Marcus Mander (22 September 1921 – 9 August 2006), the third baronet, was the only son of Charles Arthur by Monica Neame, of Kent. He fought with the Coldstream Guards in World War II in North Africa, Germany and Italy, where, following the Salerno landings, he was gravely wounded in the fighting at Calabritto, on the slopes of Monte Camino, in October 1943. He served as High Sheriff of Staffordshire in 1962–63. He was a director of Mander Brothers, responsible for its property portfolio, and redeveloped the centre of Wolverhampton, establishing the Mander Shopping Centre and Mander Square on the site of the early family works in 1968. He subsequently served as chairman of Arlington Securities, which was sold to British Aerospace, and of the property group London & Cambridge Investments, which collapsed in 1991. He developed a township for 11,500 people at Perton, outside Wolverhampton, on the family agricultural estate, which had been requisitioned as an airfield during World War II, and also farmed in Gloucestershire. His wife sustained underwriting losses as a Name in the Lloyd's insurance market in the 1990s. The Times reported on 24 June 2000 that Lady Mander, having refused a settlement offered to her by Lloyd's, was declared bankrupt. The mansion house at Little Barrow, Donnington, near Moreton-in-Marsh, Gloucestershire, was subsequently sold to meet a debt believed to exceed £1 million.
- Sir (Charles) Nicholas Mander (born 23 March 1950), the elder son of Charles Marcus by Dolores Brödermann (died 2007), of Hamburg, is the fourth and present baronet. He is a knight of the Sovereign Military Order of Malta and a Fellow of the Society of Antiquaries of London (FSA). He lives at Owlpen Manor in Gloucestershire. He was co-founder of Mander Portman Woodward and Sutton Publishing, and is the author of a history of the family and other books and articles.
- (Charles) Marcus Septimus Gustav Mander (born 1975) is the eldest son of Charles Nicholas by Karin Margareta Norin, of Stockholm, and is heir apparent to the baronetcy. He is a barrister of the Middle Temple.

== Other members of the family ==
=== Descendants of the above Henry Mander (1601–72), of Aston Cantlow ===
- The Hon. Francis Mander (1849–1942) was a member of the Parliament of New Zealand and of the Legislative Council. He stood first as an Independent Conservative and then from 1909 for the Reform Party. He won the Marsden electorate in Northland in the 1902 general election, which he held until 1922, when he retired. He was subsequently appointed to the Legislative Council in 1923 and served to 1930. In business he was a pioneer sawmiller and owner of The Northern Chronicle newspaper, based in Whangarei. He then purchased a popular newspaper, The Northern Advocate, and closed the Chronicle. He was the father of the noted New Zealand novelist and journalist, Jane Mander.
- Jane Mander (1877–1949) was one of the foremost New Zealand novelists of the early twentieth century. Her most successful novels were The Story of a New Zealand River (1920) and Allen Adair (1925). She was the daughter of the above Francis Mander and started as a journalist writing for his newspaper, The Northern Advocate.
- (Samuel) Theodore Mander (1853–1900), paint and varnish manufacturer, public servant and philanthropist, was the eldest of seven children of Samuel Small Mander. He was educated at London and Berlin Universities, and at Clare College, Cambridge. He entered the partnership of Mander Brothers with his first cousin Charles Tertius Mander in 1879. As a Congregationalist with a fervent interest in the arts and education, he was active in the building of the Wolverhampton Free Library, governor of several local schools and of Birmingham University (where he endowed a scholarship), and one of the founding benefactors of Mansfield College, Oxford, the first Nonconformist college in the university, as his father had been of Tettenhall College, established in 1862 for the children of those disadvantaged for their religious principles. A selection of his journals and letters was edited and published in 1996. He was an art collector and patron, and is remembered as the builder of Wightwick Manor in 1887 and 1893 to the designs of Edward Ould, with decorations and furnishings by C.E. Kempe, William Morris and William de Morgan, which was given by his son Geoffrey Mander to the National Trust in 1937. He was an alderman and magistrate, who died in office as Mayor of Wolverhampton at Wightwick Manor on 14 September 1901 at the early age of 47, when he was given a civic funeral.
- Sir Geoffrey Le Mesurier Mander (1882–1962), was the eldest son of (Samuel) Theodore Mander, the builder of Wightwick Manor. He was a Midland industrialist and chairman of Mander Brothers, an art collector and radical parliamentarian. He was the Member of Parliament for Wolverhampton East from May 1929 until he lost his seat in the Labour Party landslide at the 1945 general election. He was the Liberal Party specialist on foreign policy between the wars, strongly anti-Appeasement and a crusader on behalf of the League of Nations. He gave Wightwick Manor, with its outstanding collections of Victorian art, to the National Trust in 1937. His second wife, Rosalie Glynn Grylls, was a biographer of writers and artists (particularly female "Pre-Raphael-ladies") of the Romantic period, and an early authority on William Morris and the Pre-Raphaelite movement. His autobiography was published posthumously in 2021 as Lemons for Chamberlain: The Life and Backbench Career of Geoffrey Mander MP, edited by Patricia Pegg.
- Sir Frederick Mander FEIS (1883–1964) was a headmaster and trade unionist and the General Secretary of the National Union of Teachers (NUT) from 1931 to 1947. Mander College of Further Education in Bedford College was named after him. Born in Luton, Bedfordshire, he was descended from the above Henry Mander of Aston Cantlow.
- Miles Mander (1888–1946), younger brother of Geoffrey, broke away from the mould of public service and industry, and became a well-known character actor of the Hollywood cinema of the 1930s and 1940s, and film director, playwright and novelist. He was an early aviator and racing car enthusiast, who spent his 20s in New Zealand farming sheep. He achieved success in films with The First Born which he directed and acted in, and which was based on his own novel and play. He is better remembered for his character portrayals of oily types, many of them upper-crust villains – such as Cardinal Richelieu in The Three Musketeers (1939). In his Hollywood debut, he portrayed King Louis XIII in the 1935 version of that same Alexandre Dumas, père classic. Other films credits included Wuthering Heights with Laurence Olivier and Merle Oberon. His first wife was an Indian princess, Princess Prativa Sundari Devi, the daughter of the Maharajah Nripendra Narayan of Cooch Behar. His youngest brother Alan married her sister, Princess Sudhira.
- John Mander (1932–1978), a British political commentator, writer, translator from the German, editor and poet, was the younger son of Geoffrey Mander by his second wife, the author and biographer Rosalie Glynn Grylls.
- Raymond Mander (1911–1983), theatre historian, author and collector. Together with Joe Mitchenson, he was the founder of the Mander and Mitchenson Theatre Collection (MMTC) of theatrical memorabilia and archives, since 2010 housed in the Theatre Collection of the University of Bristol.
- Lewis Norman Mander, AC, FAA, FRS (1939–2020) was an Australian organic chemist; of the New Zealand branch of the family, he was born in Auckland. He has widely explored the synthesis and chemistry of the gibberellin class of diterpenes over a 20-year period at the Australian National University (ANU).

== See also ==
- Mander (surname), a list of people with the surname

== Sources ==
- Kidd, Charles (editor), Debrett's Peerage and Baronetage (Debrett's, 2008, B 626-7)
- Benjamin Mander, The King versus B. Mander and Eight Others: The Trial at Large of the Committee of the Flour and Bread Co. (of which Benjamin Mander was Chairman) at Stafford Summer Assizes, 1814, Whitehead Brothers, 1956 (reprinted)
- Charles Nicholas Mander, Varnished Leaves: a biography of the Mander Family of Wolverhampton, 1750–1950 (Owlpen Press, 2005. ISBN 0-9546056-0-8.) [with bibliography and genealogy]
- Sir Geoffrey Le Mesurier Mander (ed), The History of Mander Brothers (Wolverhampton, 1955)
- Nicholas Mander, Borromean Rings: The Genealogy of the Mander Family, 2011
- Mosley, Charles, editor, Burke's Peerage, Baronetage & Knightage, 107th edition, 3 volumes (Burke's Peerage (Genealogical Books) Ltd, 2003), volume 2, page 2589, sub Mander baronetcy of the Mount [U.K.], cr. 1911
- Official Roll of the Baronets (Standing Council of the Baronetage, 2006, 2017)
- Patricia Pegg, A Very Private Heritage: the private papers of Samuel Theodore Mander, 1853–1900 (Malvern: Images Publishing, 1996)
- Patricia Pegg, Lemons for Chamberlain: The Life and Backbench Career of Geoffrey Mander MP (Mantle Lane Press, 2021)

Baronetage of the United Kingdom
Preceded by Lonsdale baronets	Mander baronets of The Mount; 8 July 1911	Succeeded by Markham baronets
