= Nicholas Mander =

British baronet

Sir (Charles) Nicholas Mander Baronet
- Born: 23 March 1950 (age 76); Wolverhampton, Staffordshire, England
- Education: Downside School
- Alma mater: Trinity College, Cambridge
- Spouse: Karin Margareta née Norin (m. 1972)
- Children: 5

Sir Charles Nicholas Mander, 4th Baronet (born 23 March 1950) is a British baronet, historian and businessman.

== Biography ==
He is the elder son of Charles Marcus Mander, 3rd baronet of The Mount, by Maria Dolores (d. 2007), née Brödermann, of Hamburg, whom he succeeded in 2006. He was educated at Downside School, Trinity College, Cambridge (senior scholar), and Grenoble University. He is a Knight of the Sovereign Military Order of Malta and of the Sacred Military Constantinian Order of Saint George, a Fellow of the Society of Antiquaries, a liveryman of the Fishmongers' Company and a Companion of the Guild of St George.

He has owned the Tudor manor house at Owlpen Manor in Gloucestershire with its associated estate since 1974, where he has opened the house to the public. He was co-founder of Mander Portman Woodward in 1973, a group of independent sixth-form colleges based in London, and of Sutton Publishing in Gloucester. He has acted as a company director of a number of companies in the UK and Spain, and served as founder chairman of The Gloucestershire County History Trust (2010) and the Gloucestershire Care Partnership (2006), and as a trustee of the Orders of St John Care Trust and the Woodchester Mansion Trust among many charitable and voluntary organisations.

He is the author of Varnished Leaves, a history of the Mander family (2004), Country Houses of the Cotswolds (Aurum Press, 2008; Rizzoli, 2009, reprinted 2016), and of a personal memoir, Owls among Ruins (2022). He has contributed articles and reviews, principally on art and architectural history, to academic journals, newspapers and magazines.

Mander briefly appeared in the 2017 film Phantom Thread as Lord Baltimore. The Trouble with Home, a documentary film about the life of the family at Owlpen Manor, was made for HTV West and screened in July 2002.

== Selected publications ==
- Country Houses of the Cotswolds (Aurum, 2008) ISBN 978-1-84513-331-3 OCLC 836924731
- Stone Houses of the English Countryside (New York: Rizzoli Classics, 2009; reprinted 2016) ISBN 978-0-8478-4846-1 OCLC 1023086182
- Owls among Ruins: a Cotswold Memoir (Owlpen, 2022) ISBN 978-0-9546056-6-7
- Owlpen Manor: a short history and guide to a romantic Tudor manor house in the Cotswolds (Owlpen, fourth edition 1995; revised 1997, 2000, 2006), 80 pp. ISBN 978-0-9546056-1-2 OCLC 892627680
- 'The painted cloths at Owlpen Manor, Gloucestershire', in Nicola Costaras and Christina Young (eds), Setting the Scene: European Painted Cloths from the Fourteenth to the Twenty-First Century (Archetype, 2013) ISBN 978-1-904982-90-6 OCLC 888679191
- Varnished Leaves: a biography of the Mander family of Wolverhampton (Owlpen Press, 2004) xvi, 381 pages: illustrations, portraits; 24 cm ISBN 978-0-9546056-0-5 OCLC 62614241
- Norman Jewson: Architect: 1884-1975, with Simon Verity and Davina Wynne-Jones (Cirencester: Arlington Mill Museum, 1987) OCLC 1266455634
- 'Painted Cloths: History, Craftsmen and Techniques', in Textile History, v28 n2 (199701): 119-148 Unique Identifier: 5525853785. ISSN 0040-4969
- 'Painted Cloths', in Bruce R Smith and Katherine Rowe (eds), The Cambridge Guide to the Worlds of Shakespeare (New York: Cambridge University Press, 2016), vol. 1, pt 6. OCLC 890799092.
- The Queen of Seven Swords (Owlpen Press, 2013) ISBN 978-0-9546056-5-0
- Borromean Rings: the genealogy of the Mander Family (Owlpen Press, 2011; 2nd edition, revised, 2022) ISBN 978-0-9546056-0-5
- 'Wightwick Manor and the creation of the house beautiful' in Peter Burman, ed., Architecture 1900 (Shaftesbury, Dorset: Donhead, 1998), xiv, 366 pages: illustrations; 24 cm) ISBN 978-1-873394-32-8 OCLC 40215662
- Daniel Defoe, The complete English tradesman, introduction (Gloucester: Alan Sutton, 1988) ISBN 978-0-86299-464-8 OCLC 1101243830
- 'Last of the Midland Radicals; biography of Sir Geoffrey Mander, Liberal MP for Wolverhampton East, 1929-45' in Journal of Liberal History, Issue 53, (Winter 2006-07)

== Family ==
Mander married Karin Margareta, younger daughter of Gustav Arne Norin, of Bromma, Sweden, on 24 June 1972. They have five children:

- Charles Marcus Septimus Gustav Mander (born 1975), heir apparent to the baronetcy, barrister of the Middle Temple. He married Claire Wylie, by whom he has one son and three daughters.
- Benedict Edward Arthur Mander (born 1977), former journalist with the Financial Times. He married Valentina Dorronsoro of Caracas, Venezuela, and has two sons and one daughter.
- Hugo Richard Theodore (born 1981). He married Ciara Campfield and has three sons and one daughter.
- Fabian Edmund Quintin (born 1987). He married Amy Koller and has two daughters.
- Sarra Maryam (born 1973). She married Stephen Earl and has two sons and one daughter.

== Honours and arms ==
Coat of arms of Mander Baronets
Adopted Grant (Heraldic College, England), 30 May 1901 Crest On a wreath of the colours, a demi-lion couped ermine holding in the paws two annulets interlaced fessewise gules, between two buffalo horns of the last. Escutcheon Gules, on a pile invected erminois, three annulets interlaced, two and one of the field. Motto Vive Bene ('Live Well'). Symbolism Trinity; Borromean rings; valknut

- SMOM: Knight of the Sovereign Military Order of Malta
- Two Sicilies: Knight of the Sacred Military Constantinian Order of Saint George
- SMOM: Cross pro Merito Melitensi;

== See also ==
- Mander family
- Mander Baronets

== Sources ==
- Sir Geoffrey Le Mesurier Mander (ed), The History of Mander Brothers (Wolverhampton, n.d. [1955])
- Charles Nicholas Mander, Varnished Leaves: a biography of the Mander Family of Wolverhampton, 1750-1950 (Owlpen Press, 2004)
- Nicholas Mander, Borromean Rings: The Genealogy of the Mander Family, 2011
- Mosley, Charles, editor, Burke's Peerage, Baronetage & Knightage, 107th edition, 3 volumes (Burke's Peerage (Genealogical Books) Ltd, 2003), volume 2, page 2589, sub Mander baronetcy of the Mount [U.K.], cr. 1911.
- Kidd, Charles (editor), Debrett's Peerage and Baronetage, Debrett's, 2008, B 626-7
- https://www.greatbritishlife.co.uk/people/sir-nicholas-mander-historian-and-businessman-7086288

Baronetage of the United Kingdom
Preceded by Charles Marcus Mander	Baronet (of The Mount); 2006–present	Incumbent
