= Nancy Manter =

American visual artist

- Born: Bangor, Maine, US
- Education: University of Wisconsin, Madison; University of New Mexico, Albuquerque
- Known for: Painting, drawing, photography
- Awards: New York Foundation for the Arts; Princeton Atelier; MacDowell
- Website: Nancy Manter

Nancy Manter is an American visual artist based on the East Coast. Her paintings, drawings and photographs of temporal works are inspired by physical processes and properties of the earth and capture qualities such as movement, disruption and ephemerality. Although generally abstract and rooted in formal aspects of picture-making, her translations of the shifting dynamics of weather and environment function as metaphors for human experience in a precarious world, suggesting themes regarding interdependence, memory as a vehicle for critique, and the fate of the planet (e.g., Stay Still #13, 2016). Critic Stephen Maine observed, Manter's work "expresses an attitude toward the world, predicated on a belief in the efficacy of images in conveying meaning. That worldview, it seems to me, is a hybrid of curiosity and caution. Manter is curious about conflict—in fact, she relies on conflict of various kinds to give rise to the drama, the pictorial momentum, in her work."

Manter's work belongs to the collections of institutions including the Whitney Museum, Metropolitan Museum of Art, Museum of Modern Art (MoMA), British Museum, The Phillips Collection, and Smithsonian American Art Museum. She has exhibited at the Drawing Center, Brooklyn Museum, Boston Center for the Arts, Kentler International Drawing Space, Baker Museum and Missoula Art Museum, among other venues. She lives and works in Beacon, New York and Bass Harbor, Maine.

== Early life and career ==
Manter was born in Bangor, Maine and grew up in nearby Veazie. Her father was a cardiologist and her mother an artist, encouraging her longstanding split interests in science and art. The local landscape, characterized by extreme contrasts in weather and geological features, has had an equally profound influence on her work. Manter studied art at the University of New Mexico, Albuquerque, receiving a BFA in 1975. In 1978, she earned an MFA from the University of Wisconsin, Madison.

In her early career, Manter exhibited at venues including the Heckscher Museum of Art, Elvehjem Museum, Chicago Cultural Center and Drawing Center. In the 2000s, she has had solo exhibitions at the Newhouse Center for Contemporary Art (2008), College of the Atlantic (2010), Kentler International Drawing Space (2013) and Dieu Donne Papermill (2015), among others. She appeared in group shows at the Arkansas Art Center and Islip Art Museum, and in surveys such as the Portland Museum of Art Biennial (2003), "Dynamic Intervention" (Brattleboro Museum and Art Center, 2013), and the traveling show, "Blurring Boundaries: Women of the American Abstract Artists 1936-Present" (South Bend Museum of Art, 2019; Baker Museum, 2021). In 2010, Dieu Donne Press published the limited-edition handmade book Water Prayers, featuring Manter’s imagery and the poems of Stuart Kestenbaum.

== Work and reception ==
Manter's interests extend across art history and natural science subjects such as tides, extreme atmosphere, wind circulation, geological surfaces and plate tectonics. Visual inspirations include scientific charts, maps and Landsat images. Her art-historical influences include Japanese and Chinese landscapes, modernists Arthur Dove, Marsden Hartley and Charles Burchfield, contemporary artist Elizabeth Murray, and historical figures such as the Hudson River School painters. Like the latter group, who sought to convey the sublime in landscape, her work expresses feelings of foreboding, anticipation and curiosity about nature.

Nancy Manter, Snow Driven #3, archival pigment print (photo), variable size, 2010.

Manter's art is rooted in landscape, weather conditions and the making of meaning within familiar environments. Her shift to abstraction in the 1990s paradoxically led to more direct, transparent methods with a strong gestural component that balanced deliberate orchestration with chance occurrence and evoked the movement of the body in space. These gestures can range from more traditional mark-making to actions such as fingers tracing on a dewy window or feet tracking through wet ground. Manter's painting and drawing method is largely intuitive, involving the layering of successive forms in flat space, guided in her words by "emotional, visual and muscle memory." These works often juxtapose representations of contrasting, shifting environments: the calmness of flat dawn light on water, the movement of fog, the chaos of snow and sleet windstorms, or the rigid geometry of rocks against the water and skyline.

Manter has also produced temporal drawings captured in photographs, which consist of footprints or tracks embedded in the landscape by trampling through mud and tidal flats or driving and skiing in snow, as well as images created by making marks in the condensation of car windshields and windows (e.g., Snow Driven #3, 2010). Her photographs of these actions have often served as sedimentary layers onto which she poured or spilled distemper paint or stacked in thin layers of collage over to suggest geological surfaces.

=== Individual series and projects ===
Manter's "Paper Pulp" drawings (2002) referenced her prior large-scale "Traces" series (2001), which was created by marking snowy or muddy landscapes with sticks, her feet or skis, then photographing them. For the "Paper Pulp" works, she skied over sheets of fabric or roofing paper covered with thick layers of wet paper pulp. The incised and patterned material was then transferred onto black, homemade archival paper at the Dieu Donné Papermill, yielding what critic Patricia C. Phillips termed "immediate, contingent, searching and vulnerable" works that sought not to describe place, but rather, bore "witness to a moment and to memory." For her "Road Art" series of prints, Manter photographed skid marks at car-crash sites in rural Maine. She printed them on acetate, overlaid her own skid-like marks, and then displayed the results floating against areas of charcoal-drawn wall (Boston Center for the Arts, 2004), creating uncertain spaces in terms of dark and light, mark versus ground, and origin.

In shows at the Islip Art Museum, Central Park Arsenal Galley and College of the Atlantic (2009–10), Manter took a similarly layered approach to convey the human imprint on place and nature by tracing on frosted or condensation-laden windshields. Her marks playfully echoed the grids of window architecture and screens, while affording outside views of trees and landscape. New York Times critic Benjamin Gennochio observed the play of exposure and refuge, noting that this work was "fascinated by the contrast between the safety of the car and the numbing cold outside, which makes the images intense." The transitory images were sometimes combined in photographic form with other pieces in her studio, as in the "Huellas" series; the title is a Spanish word signifying a mark or sign, not necessarily intentional.

Nancy Manter, Cross-cut #1, Flashe paint on beveled wood panel, 2025.

For her exhibition at the Kentler International Drawing Space, "Water Prayers" (2013)—located in a Red Hook, New York neighborhood recently impacted by Hurricane Sandy—Manter used abstract form and unconventional materials to convey what was described as a "weather-related dialectic of stability and disorder" that was both site-and time-specific. The gestural works were primarily made using acrylic gesso on black roofing paper. The rough, somewhat absorbent substrate enabled her to achieve atmospheric effects, from oozing washes and pooling runoff to brushy passages and impasto-like surfaces. Playing on its function as a membrane between the indoors and the outdoors, the roofing paper offered a psychologically charged metaphor for protection from the natural elements of wind, rain and cold. By contrast, Manter's collaboration with Voot Yin, a biologist at the MDI Biological Laboratory took inspiration from microscopic laboratory imagery and the creative, investigative processes of science, as reflected in the show's title, "Regeneration" (2013); its images combined liquidy abstract marks, fragments of research notebooks and organic shapes forms derived from zebrafish (e.g., Solve the Mystery #2).

In later series Manter has explored urban environments and geological phenomena in works that juggle spaces structured by planes of color and texture (e.g., Cross-cut #1, 2025). Her "Run and Slide" and "Run and Pour" series (2021) employ pockets of color that suggest toxic chemical activity, such as the yellow and green smog and waterways of Superfund sites. In other works, she references geological terms like "dip-slip faults" and "chatter marks" in form and titles. Maine Arts Journal editor Véronique Plesch noted, "Her abstract work displays tectonic shifts as fluid streaks of color spread across the pictorial field, with caesuras rupturing it like fault lines, the color scheme and abrupt contrasts in value suggesting intense weather patterns interacting with the environment—sea, rocks, vegetation."

== Recognition and acknowledgements ==
Manter's work belongs to the public art collections of the British Museum, Brooklyn Museum, Chazen Museum of Art, Delaware Art Museum, Fogg Art Museum, Metropolitan Museum of Art, Milwaukee Museum of Art, Museum of Fine Arts, Boston, Museum of Fine Arts, Houston, Museum of Modern Art, The Phillips Collection, Portland Art Museum, Smithsonian American Art Museum, Weatherspoon Art Museum, and Whitney Museum, among others.

She has received grants from the New York Foundation for the Arts, New York Department of Cultural Affairs, Ariana Foundation for the Arts, Verrazano Foundation and New School, among other recognition. She has been awarded artist residencies by Fundación Valparaiso (Spain), MacDowell, the Princeton Atelier, Virginia Center for the Creative Arts and Ucross Foundation. In 1996, Manter was inducted into American Abstract Artists in New York.
