= Maunder (surname) =

Maunder is an English surname, a variant of Mander. Notable people with the surname include:

- Alexander Maunder (1861–1932), British sport shooter
- Annie Scott Dill Maunder (1868–1947), Irish astronomer and mathematician
- Edward Walter Maunder (1851–1928), English astronomer
- John Henry Maunder (1858–1920), English composer and organist
- Jack Maunder (born 1997), English rugby player
- Lucy Maunder, Australian cabaret and theatre performer, daughter of Stuart
- Maria Maunder (born 1972), Canadian rower
- Paul Maunder (born 1945), New Zealand film director, playwright and cultural activist
- Richard Maunder (1937–2018), British mathematician and musicologist
- Samuel Maunder (1785–1849), English writer and composer
- Stuart Maunder (born 1957), Australian opera director, father of Lucy
- Wayne Maunder (1937–2018), Canadian-American actor
- William Maunder (1902–1964), Australian association football player
