= Rosalie Glynn Grylls =

British politician and writer (1905–1988)

- Rosalie Grylls
- Born: 13 April 1905
- Died: 2 November 1988 (aged 83)
- Education: Queen's College, London; Lady Margaret Hall, Oxford
- Occupations: Politician & writer
- Political party: Liberal
- Spouse: Geoffrey Mander (m. 1930; died 1962)
- Children: 2
- Father: Archibald Campbell Glynn Grylls
- Relatives: John Mander (son)

(Mary) Rosalie Glynn Grylls (13 April 1905 – 2 November 1988), was a British biographer, lecturer and Liberal Party politician. In 1945 she became known as Rosalie Lady Mander.

She was the daughter of Archibald Campbell Glynn Grylls of Cornwall; the family had been established in the county for centuries. She was educated at Queen's College, London, and Lady Margaret Hall, Oxford, where she graduated with a Master of Arts.

In 1929 she was employed as Secretary to the Liberal MP Edgar Granville. In July 1930 she was selected as Liberal prospective parliamentary candidate for the Reading Division of Berkshire for the General Election that was to occur in 1931.

In November 1930 she married Liberal MP Geoffrey Mander at a ceremony at the House of Commons, where Granville was Mander's best man. She was Mander’s second wife. They had one son and one daughter: John Geoffrey Grylls Mander and Anthea Loveday Veronica Mander.

By the time the General Election came, a National Government had been formed and the Reading Liberals did not contest the constituency. Although she remained interested in politics, she did not attempt to stand again for public office and instead concentrated on her writing.

She was a noted biographer with a special interest in the writers and artists of the Romantic period, and an early connoisseur of the Pre-Raphaelite movement. Her biographical subjects included Mary Shelley (1938), Claire Clairmont (1939), Edward John Trelawny (1950), William Godwin (1953), Dante Gabriel Rossetti (1965), Ivy Compton-Burnett (1971) and Elizabeth Barrett Browning (1980). She was influential in the overdue reassessment of the artists and writers of the Victorian period, lecturing widely in Britain and the United States. Her husband had donated their house, Wightwick Manor, with its representative collection of Victorian and Pre-Raphaelite art and manuscripts, to the National Trust in 1937. She continued to open the house to the public and add to its contents until her death in London on 2 November 1988.
