= Geoffrey Mander =

British industrialist and politician

Sir Geoffrey Mander

Member of Parliament for Wolverhampton East
- In office 1929–1945
- Preceded by: George Rennie Thorne
- Succeeded by: John Baird

Personal details
- Born: Geoffrey Le Mesurier Mander; 6 March 1882 Wolverhampton, England
- Died: 9 September 1962 (aged 80) Wightwick Manor, England
- Party: Liberal (until 1948); Labour (after 1948)
- Spouses: Rosalind Florence Caverhill; Rosalie Glynn Grylls (m. 1930)
- Children: Mervyn Mander; Mavis Mander; Elizabeth Mander; John Mander; Anthea Mander
- Parents: Samuel Theodore Mander; Flora St Clair Paint
- Relatives: Miles Mander (brother); Charles Arthur Mander (first and second cousin); Mander family
- Education: Harrow School; Trinity College, Cambridge
- Occupation: Politician, industrialist, art patron

Military service
- Allegiance: United Kingdom
- Branch/service: British Army
- Unit: Royal Flying Corps
- Battles/wars: World War I

Sir Geoffrey Le Mesurier Mander (6 March 1882 – 9 September 1962) was a Midland industrialist and chairman of Mander Brothers Ltd., paint and varnish manufacturers in Wolverhampton, England, an art collector and Liberal parliamentarian.

== Early career ==
Geoffrey Mander was the oldest son of (Samuel) Theodore Mander (of a cadet branch of the prominent Mander family of Midland industrialists and public servants) and his wife, Flora St Clair Paint. Mander's younger brother was actor, playwright and film director Miles Mander. He was educated at Harrow and Trinity College, Cambridge, served in the Royal Flying Corps in World War I, and was called to the bar at the Inner Temple (1921).

== Politician ==
He entered the House of Commons as the Liberal Party Member of Parliament (MP) for Wolverhampton East at the general election in May 1929. He was a Liberal specialist on foreign policy between the wars, and was one of the first to take a strong stand against Appeasement of the fascist dictators, and was a crusader on behalf of the League of Nations. During World War II, he was Parliamentary Private Secretary to Sir Archibald Sinclair (later, first Viscount Thurso), the Secretary of State for Air. He won a reputation in Parliament for his determined use of parliamentary questions. For example, just over a month after the formal establishment of the Peace Pledge Union on 22 May 1936, he asked the first of numerous hostile questions about it on 25 June 1936.

Wolverhampton East was one of the last urban constituencies which the Liberals managed to hold against both Labour Party and Conservative Party opposition up to 1945. Mander was expected to be nominated Chief Whip for the Liberal Party in the House of Commons, but he lost his seat at the 1945 general election, in the post-war Labour landslide. Considering that Labour had now replaced the Liberals as the main representative of the radical tradition in British politics, he joined the Labour party in 1948, and subsequently served as a Labour member of Staffordshire County Council.

Among many public offices, he was High Sheriff of Staffordshire (1921), a county councillor, justice of the peace, and was made a Knight Bachelor for public services in the 1945 New Year Honours shortly before his enforced retirement from Parliament.

== Industrialist ==
He was chairman of Mander Brothers (established in 1773) for a generation, one of the principal local employers and a major manufacturer of paints, inks and varnishes in the British Empire. As an industrialist, he led many progressive initiatives in the field of labour relations and employment welfare between the Wars. Under his direction, Mander Brothers was the first British company to introduce the 40-hour week through an historic agreement signed and mediated by Ernest Bevin, general secretary of the Transport and General Workers' Union, in September 1931.

== Art patron ==
He was an early conservationist. He offered to buy for the nation William Morris's Red House in London, if a suitable tenant could be found. He did present the family house, Wightwick Manor, in Staffordshire, with its outstanding collections of Victorian art and objects associated with William Morris, the Pre-Raphaelite Brotherhood and the Arts and Crafts movement to the National Trust in 1937. It was the first country house to be so presented during the lifetime of its donor.

His second wife, Rosalie Glynn Grylls, was a biographer and lecturer with an interest in the writers and artists of the Romantic period, and an early connoisseur of the Pre-Raphaelite movement. Her biographical subjects included Mary Shelley (1938), Claire Clairmont (1939), Edward John Trelawny (1950), William Godwin (1953), Dante Gabriel Rossetti (1964), Ivy Compton-Burnett (1971) and Elizabeth Barrett Browning (1980). Together Geoffrey and Rosalie Mander were influential in the overdue reassessment of the artists and writers of the Victorian period.

His autobiography was published posthumously in 2021 as Lemons for Chamberlain: The Life and Backbench Career of Geoffrey Mander MP, edited by Patricia Pegg.

== Personal life ==
Mander was married twice. His first marriage was to Rosalind Florence Caverhill, of Montreal. They had three children:

- Mervyn Caverhill Mander
- Mavis Flora Rosalind Mander
- Elizabeth Brehaut Mander

His second marriage was to Mary Rosalie Glynn Grylls. Their wedding took place in the House of Commons, where Liberal MP Edgar Granville served as best man. The couple had two children:

- John Geoffrey Grylls Mander, poet, author and cultural critic (1932–1978)
- Anthea Loveday Veronica Mander (1945–2004); married John Lahr in 1965.

Parliament of the United Kingdom
Preceded by George Thorne	Member of Parliament for Wolverhampton East; 1929–1945	Succeeded by John Baird
