= Mander Brothers =

Company based in Wolverhampton, England

- Industry: Chemicals, coatings, property, japanning, varnish
- Founded: 1773
- Defunct: 1998
- Successor: Flint Ink, Detroit, and Total, France
- Headquarters: Wolverhampton, England, UK
- Key people: The Mander Family
- Products: Varnishes, paints, printing inks

Mander Brothers was a major employer in the city of Wolverhampton, in the English Midlands, a progressive company founded in 1773. In the 19th century the firm became the number one manufacturers of varnishes, paints and later printing inks in the British Empire. In the twentieth century it developed its product range in industrial coatings and inks, as well as commercial property.

== History of Mander Brothers ==
Mander Brothers has its origins in businesses developed by the Mander family in the Wolverhampton of the early Industrial Revolution, where members of the family first developed trades in the manufacture of chemicals and varnishes to supply the Midland Japan trades and national markets.

=== 18th century ===
In the early industrial revolution, the Mander family entered the vanguard of the expansion of Wolverhampton, on the edge of the largest manufacturing conurbation in the British Isles. The brothers Benjamin and John Mander were early industrialists and entrepreneurs, who established a cluster of loosely integrated businesses in paints, lacquers and pigments, japanning, chemicals manufacture and varnish making.

=== 19th century ===
By 1820, the firm traded as Mander, Weaver & Co., already operating one of the largest chemical manufacturing works in the country, trading from the United States of America to China. They developed businesses in baking, japanning and tin-plate working, canals and gas manufacture. Benjamin Mander was chairman of the Wolverhampton Union Flour and Bread Company, a co-operative milling company set up to provide subsidised bread and flour in the period of social distress following the Napoleonic Wars.

The partnership of Mander Brothers was founded by the brothers Charles Benjamin Mander and Samuel Small Mander in 1845, concentrating on varnish manufacture. As the business expanded with the Industrial Revolution and the rise of railways all over the British Empire, branches and agencies were established in "all the civilised countries of the world". The company diversified into paint and printing ink manufacture from 1865.

The family became distinguished for public service, art patronage and philanthropy. Charles Tertius Mander (1852–1929) was created the first baronet of The Mount in the baronetage of the United Kingdom in the Coronation honours of George V, on 8 July 1911.

=== 20th century ===
The business was constituted as a limited company, Mander Brothers Limited, in 1924, when Sir Charles Tertius Mander was appointed the first chairman, or "governing director".

Under the chairmanship of the Radical Liberal M.P., Sir Geoffrey Mander, Mander Brothers led many progressive initiatives in the field of labour relations and employment welfare between the Wars. Mander Brothers was the first British company to introduce the 40-hour week through an historic agreement signed and mediated by Ernest Bevin, general secretary of the Transport and General Workers' Union, in September 1932. As in similar important TGWU negotiations in the early 1930s, such as at Imperial Chemical Industries and Crosse and Blackwell, reduced working hours coupled with increased worker efficiency was facilitated by the Bedaux Unit.

In the mid-twentieth century, constituted as Manders Holdings Limited, the company redeveloped their historic properties on a 4 1/2-acre site in the centre of Wolverhampton. In 1968–74 the company established the Mander Shopping Centre and Mander Square on the site of the early family works, dating to the eighteenth century. Today the Mander Centre dominates the retail heart of the city. It was acquired by Dalancey Estates in partnership with the Royal Bank of Scotland in 2010, which led to controversy and questions in Parliament when they removed a bronze sculpture, 'Rock Form (Porthcurno)', by Barbara Hepworth, specially commissioned for the site and donated by the Mander family and shareholders in 1968. On 4 December 2014, the Mander Centre was acquired by Benson Elliot Capital Management for £59 million ahead of a £60 million reconfiguration and refurbishment, which saw the Mander Centre anchored by a 90,000 sq ft Debenhams Department store, which opened in 2017.

In the 1990s, trading as Manders PLC, the various divisions of the business were sold piecemeal in a major Group restructuring in order to focus on the core activity of printing inks and specialty chemicals manufacture. First, the paints and coatings businesses were sold to the Total S.A. Group of France; then the property portfolio, including the Mander Centre, was sold to the Prudential Insurance Company.

Manders PLC went on to acquire a number of the world's leading ink manufacturers, including a major competitor, Croda, trading with operations in the UK, Ireland, Italy, the Netherlands, New Zealand, South Africa, Zimbabwe and the USA. In 1994 the Netherlands-based company Premier Inks was acquired, when the major brand became Manders Premier. Manders PLC was established as one of Europe's largest manufacturers and distributors of publishing and industrial inks.

In 1998, the printing inks division was sold to the Flint Ink Corporation, of Detroit in the United States of America, "so ending a long chapter in the British chemicals industry" (The Financial Times).

In 2000, Manders Premier adopted the Flint Ink identity of Flint Ink Europe, headquartered in Luxembourg.

== Sources ==
- Sir Geoffrey Le Mesurier Mander (ed), The History of Mander Brothers (Wolverhampton, n.d. [1955])
- Mander, Nicholas (2004). Varnished Leaves: a biography of the Mander family of Wolverhampton. Owlpen: Owlpen Press. ISBN 0-9546056-0-8.
- Patricia Pegg, A Very Private Heritage: the private papers of Samuel Theodore Mander, 1853–1900 (Malvern: Images Publishing, 1996)
- Patricia Pegg, Lemons for Chamberlain: The Life and Backbench Career of Geoffrey Mander MP (Mantle Lane Press, 2021)

== See also ==
- Mander baronets
- Mander family
