= General Wrottesley =

General Wrottesley may refer to:

- George Wrottesley (1827–1909), British Army major general
- John Wrottesley, 1st Baron Wrottesley (1771–1841), British Army major general
- Sir John Wrottesley, 8th Baronet (1744–1787), British Army major general
