= Wrottesley =

Wrottesley may refer to:

- Baron Wrottesley, a title in the Peerage of the United Kingdom (and any member of the Wrottesley family holding that title)
- John Wrottesley (disambiguation)
- Wrottesley (crater), an impact crater on the Moon
- Wrottesley Hall, Staffordshire
- Wrottesley Polytechnic, fictional establishment created by Howard Jacobson in his Coming from Behind
