= Ralph Sneyd =

Ralph Sneyd may refer to:

- Ralph Sneyd (MP for Stafford) (1564–1643), English politician and Royalist army officer of the English Civil War
- Ralph Sneyd (MP for Staffordshire) (1692–1733), English politician
- Ralph Sneyd (landowner) (1793–1870), English landowner, known for the rebuilding of Keele Hall
