= John Wrottesley =

John Wrottesley may refer to:

- Sir John Wrottesley, 4th Baronet, MP for Staffordshire (UK Parliament constituency) 1708–1710
- Sir John Wrottesley, 8th Baronet (1744–1787)
- John Wrottesley, 1st Baron Wrottesley (1771–1841)
- John Wrottesley, 2nd Baron Wrottesley (1798–1867)
