= Arthur Wrottesley, 3rd Baron Wrottesley =

British peer and Liberal politician (1824-1910)

The Right Honourable The Lord Wrottesley
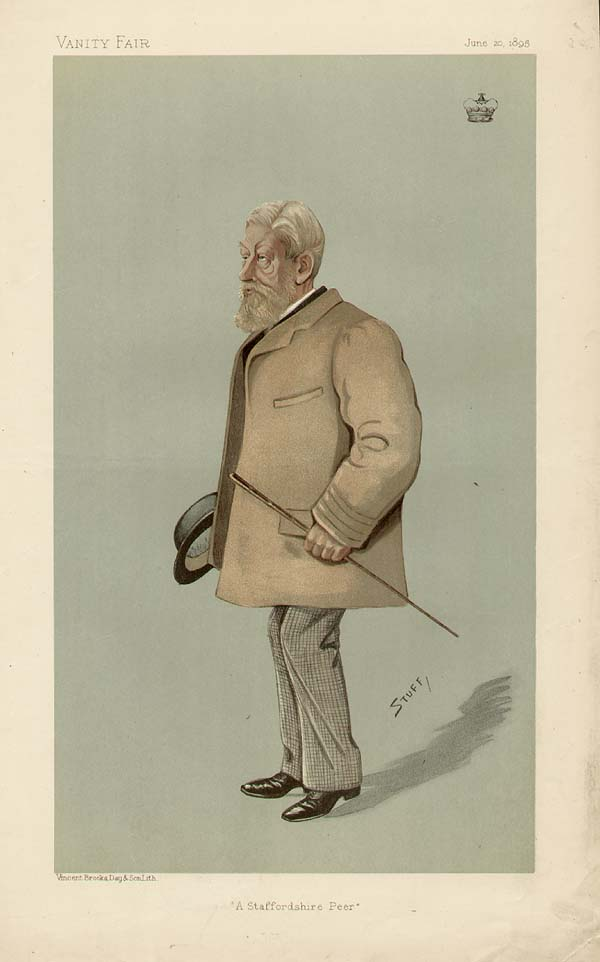
- "A Staffordshire Peer", Wrottesley in Vanity Fair by "Stuff", June 1895

Lord-in-waiting
- In office 1869–1874
- Preceded by: The Marquess of Normanby
- Succeeded by: The Lord Walsingham

Lord-in-waiting
- In office 1880–1885
- Preceded by: The Viscount Hawarden
- Succeeded by: The Lord Elphinstone

Lord Lieutenant of Staffordshire
- In office 1871–1887
- Preceded by: The Earl of Lichfield
- Succeeded by: The Earl of Dartmouth

Personal details
- Born: 17 June 1824 London, England
- Died: 28 December 1910 (aged 86) 8 Herbert Crescent, Knightsbridge, London, England
- Party: Liberal
- Spouse: Hon. Augusta Elizabeth Denison (m. 1861)
- Children: 5
- Parents: John Wrottesley, 2nd Baron Wrottesley (father); Sophia Elizabeth Giffard (mother)
- Relatives: Victor Alexander Wrottesley, 4th Baron Wrottesley (son); John Wrottesley (paternal grandfather); George Wrottesley (brother)
- Education: Rugby School; Christ Church, Oxford

Arthur Wrottesley, 3rd Baron Wrottesley (17 June 1824 – 28 December 1910), was a British peer and Liberal politician.

== Early life and education ==
Wrottesley was born in London, the son of John Wrottesley, 2nd Baron Wrottesley, President of the Royal Society, and his wife, Sophia Elizabeth Giffard, daughter of Thomas Giffard of Chillington Hall. He was educated at Rugby School and Christ Church, Oxford. A keen cricketer, Wrottesley played a single first-class cricket match for the Marylebone Cricket Club in 1845.

== Career ==
Wrottesley took his seat in the House of Lords on his father's death in 1867 and two years later he was appointed a Lord-in-waiting (government whip in the House of Lords) in the first Liberal administration of William Ewart Gladstone. Lord Wrottesley retained this post until the government fell in 1874, and held the same office from 1880 to 1885 in Gladstone's second administration. Apart from his political career he also served as Lord Lieutenant of Staffordshire from 1871 to 1887.

== Marriage and issue ==
In 1861, Wrottesley married Hon. Augusta Elizabeth Denison, daughter of Albert Denison, 1st Baron Londesborough, in 1861. They had four sons and a daughter.

- Capt. Hon. William Wrottesley (17 May 1863 – 7 October 1899), 4th Dragoon Guards, died unmarried
- Hon. Bertram Francis Wrottesley (20 July 1864 – 26 October 1875), died young
- Hon. Evelyn Henrietta Wrottesley (10 October 1866 – 30 October 1947), married in 1910 2nd Viscount Wolverhampton
- Victor Alexander Wrottesley, 4th Baron Wrottesley (1873–1962), died unmarried
- Lt. Hon. Walter Bennet Wrottesley (28 September 1877 – 25 May 1962), married in 1917 (divorce 1926) Kate May, only daughter of Douglas Howard Harris of Craddock, Cape Colony, South Africa; father of Richard Wrottesley, 5th Baron Wrottesley

Lord Wrottesley died in December 1910, aged 86, at his home, 8 Herbert Crescent, Knightsbridge. He had been unwell for some time and was recovering from a broken leg caused by a fall. He was succeeded by his eldest surviving son.

Political offices
Preceded by The Marquess of Normanby	Lord-in-waiting; 1869–1874	Succeeded by The Lord Walsingham
Preceded by The Viscount Hawarden	Lord-in-waiting; 1880–1885	Succeeded by The Lord Elphinstone
Honorary titles
Preceded by The Earl of Lichfield	Lord Lieutenant of Staffordshire; 1871–1887	Succeeded by The Earl of Dartmouth
Peerage of the United Kingdom
Preceded by John Wrottesley	Baron Wrottesley; 1867–1910	Succeeded by Victor Alexander Wrottesley
