= Walter Wrottesley =

Sir Walter Wrottesley (died 1473), was a Captain of Calais.

He was eldest son of Hugh Wrottesley (d 1464) and his wife Thomasine, daughter of Sir John Gresley of Drakelaw. The family, whose name seems originally to have been Verdon, had been settled at Wrottesley in Staffordshire for many centuries, the first to adopt the name Wrottesley being William de Verdon, who succeeded to the manor in 1199, and died in 1242.

Walter, the High Sheriff of Staffordshire for 1460-61, was a firm adherent of Warwick "the king-maker". On 26 January 1461–2, styled a ‘king's knight’, he was granted the manors of Ramsham and Penpole, Dorset, formerly belonging to William Neville, 1st Earl of Kent. Grants of the manors of Clynte, Hondesworth, and Mere in Staffordshire, formerly belonging to the Lancastrian James Butler, Earl of Wiltshire, soon followed, and on 14 June 1463 Wrottesley was one of those to whom Warwick was allowed to alienate manors and castles, although their reversion might belong to the crown. Wrottesley joined Warwick in his attempt to overthrow the Woodvilles, and when in 1471 the king-maker restored Henry VI, Wrottesley was put in command of Calais, a stronghold of the Nevilles. After Warwick's defeat and death at Barnet on 14 April, Wrottesley surrendered Calais to Edward IV in exchange for a free pardon.

He died in 1473 and is said to have been buried in Greyfriars Church, London. By his wife Jane, daughter of William Baron of Reading, he left two sons — Richard, who succeeded him, and was Sheriff of Staffordshire for 1492–3, and William — and three daughters. His descendant, Sir Walter Wrottesley (d. 1659), was created a baronet in 1642, and the seventh baronet, Sir Richard Wrottesley (d. 1769), Dean of Worcester, was grandfather of John, first Baron Wrottesley.
