= Richard Wrottesley =

Richard Wrottesley may refer to:

- Richard John Wrottesley, 5th Baron Wrottesley, British peer and army officer
- Sir Richard Wrottesley, 7th Baronet, member of parliament and Anglican clergyman
