= Victor Wrottesley, 4th Baron Wrottesley =

British peer (1873-1962)

The Right Honourable The Lord Wrottesley
- Tenure: 1910–1962
- Predecessor: Arthur Wrottesley, 3rd Baron Wrottesley
- Successor: Richard John Wrottesley, 5th Baron Wrottesley
- Born: Hon. Victor Alexander Wrottesley; 18 September 1873; Wrottesley Hall, Staffordshire, England
- Died: 1 September 1962 (aged 88); Staffordshire, England
- Parents: Arthur Wrottesley, 3rd Baron Wrottesley; Hon. Augusta Elizabeth Denison
- Education: Christ Church, Oxford

Sir Victor Alexander Wrottesley, 12th Baronet Wrottesley, 4th Baron Wrottesley (18 September 1873 – 1 September 1962) was a British peer.

== Biography ==
Wrottesley was the third son of Arthur Wrottesley, 3rd Baron Wrottesley and his wife Hon. Augusta Elizabeth Denison, daughter of Albert Denison, 1st Baron Londesborough. By 1901 he was farming at New House, Ewhurst, Sussex. He had returned to the family seat, Wrottesley Hall, by 1926, where he lived until his death in 1962.

He was predeceased by his two older brothers and took his seat in the House of Lords on the death of his father in 1910.

He died in September 1962, aged 88, and was succeeded in the baronetcy and barony by his nephew Richard John Wrottesley, 5th Baron Wrottesley.

== See also ==
- Baron Wrottesley, and The Wrottesley Baronetcy
- Wrottesley Hall, Staffordshire

Peerage of the United Kingdom
Preceded by Arthur Wrottesley	Baron Wrottesley; 1910–1962	Succeeded by Richard John Wrottesley
