= Sir Walter Wrottesley, 3rd Baronet =

Walter Wrottesley
- Born: 1659; Wrottesley Hall, Staffordshire, England
- Died: 1712 (aged 52–53); England
- Education: Magdalen College, Oxford; Matric. 18 March 1675
- Spouses: Eleanora Archer; Anne Burton
- Children: Walter; John; Eleanora; Henrietta (Harriot); Mary; Walter; Margaret; Anne
- Parent(s): Sir Walter Wrottesley, 2nd Baronet; Margaret Wollryche

Sir Walter Wrottesley, 3rd Baronet (c.1659–1712), of Wrottesley Hall, then in Tettenhall, today Perton, in Staffordshire, England.

Sir Walter Wrottesley was son to Sir Walter Wrottesley, 2nd Baronet (c.1632–c.1686), and Margaret Wollryche, daughter to Sir Thomas Wolryche, 1st Baronet. Wrottesley matriculated for Magdalen College, Oxford in 1675. He became the 3rd Baronet on the death of his father in 1686.

Wrottesley married firstly Eleanora Archer (c.1660–1693) on 27 June 1678, she was the daughter to Sir John Archer of Coopersale House, Essex and his second wife Eleanor Curzon who was daughter to Sir John Curson, Baronet of Kedleston, Derbyshire. Their first son Walter died in 1686. Their second son John, born in 1863, became Sir John Wrottesley, 4th Baronet and died in 1726; further children were daughters Eleanora, Henrietta (or Harriot), and Mary. The marriage settlement for Wrottesley and Eleanora from the 2nd Baronet included, through trustees, variously the manors, lands and tithes of Wrottesley, Oaken, Oaken Park, Tettenhall Clericorum, Tresley & Seisdon, Wombourne & Orton, Codsall, Billbroke, Wightwike, Swindon, and Orton & Chaspell. Sir John Archer settled £6,000 on the couple and their issue.

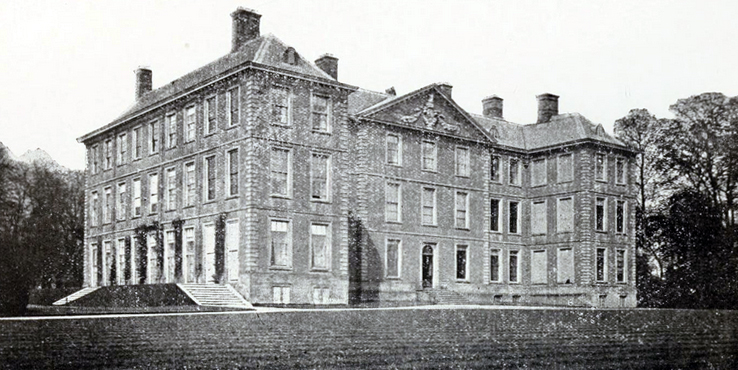
Wrottesley Hall

Shortly after the death of Eleanora, Wrottesley married Anne Burton, daughter to Justice Burton of Longnor, Shropshire, and with her produced a son, Walter, and daughters Margaret and Anne. After marrying Anne he decided in 1696 to demolish Wrottesley Hall, fill-in its moat, and on the site built a new 'H' plan house designed by Christopher Wren. The money for the rebuilding came from his first wife, parts of whose Archer arms overlapped those of Wrottesley on the hall front pediment. This new house burnt down in 1897 destroying all estate records. During the rebuilding of Wrottesley Hall the 3rd Baronet lived at Somerford Hall in Brewood, the house, manor and estate, which included Horsebrook (in Brewood) and Stretton, he had acquired by buying the mortgages of John Somerford. Wrottesley died at Somerford in 1712. His will stated a wish to be buried in Brewood church or churchyard [St Mary and St Chad], where also his wife Anne was buried in 1732; he also stipulated that Somerford Hall be left to his second wife and her issue.

== See also ==
- Baron Wrottesley, and The Wrottesley Baronetcy
- Wrottesley Hall, Staffordshire

Baronetage of England
Preceded by Walter Wrottesley	Baronet (of Wrottesley); 1686–1712	Succeeded by John Wrottesley
