= Blackheath Proprietary School =

Location
- Blackheath; Greenwich, London; England
- Coordinates: 51.46438°N 0.00781°E

Information
- Type: Proprietary School
- Motto: docendum et discendum "To be taught and to learn"
- Religious affiliation: Church of England
- Established: 1830
- Closed: 1907; 119 years ago
- Gender: Boys
- Age: 11 to 18

The Blackheath Proprietary School was a proprietary school founded in 1830. In the 19th century, it had a profound influence on the game of football, in both Association and Rugby codes. In 1863, the school became one of the founders of The Football Association.

== History ==
The Blackheath Proprietary School was established in 1830 to give sound liberal education similar to the public schools of England. From its inception, it worked towards ensuring it had an educational reputation that would be the equivalent of its public school contemporaries and the school granted an exhibition of £50 per annum every two years to pupils proceeding to Oxford, Cambridge or Dublin universities. Blackheath's population had expanded rapidly in the 1820s, hence the timing of the establishment of the school. The school was founded on joint stock principles and there were originally 100 shares priced at £20 each; proprietorship of a share entitled its owner to send or nominate a boy to the school. From 1831 when it opened it was successful, particularly under Reverend Edward Selwyn, an alumnus of Trinity College, Cambridge. He was head from 1849 to 1864 and remarkably in his last three years, when there were more than 200 boys in the school, every boy in the upper sixth won an open scholarship to Oxford or Cambridge. The school also had a cadet corps. In 1880 a sister school was opened on Wemyss Road, Blackheath High School for girls, to provide a standard of education for the young women of Blackheath, comparable to that of the boys' school. The school was built at the initiative of local residents, but was run by the Girls Public Day School Company.

Although the Proprietary School flourished for much of the nineteenth century, it was threatened by a number of elements including the diminishing lease on its site, the popularity of boarding schools and the growing availability of day schools nearby. The school closed in 1907.

== Buildings ==
The school buildings were situated near Blackheath Park and in Lee Park and were described as "a handsome building after the model of the Propylaeum in Athens". The school's buildings were at the very top of the current Lee Road on its west side. The site was redeveloped in 1937 as Selwyn Court (this building caused much controversy in Blackheath and was a catalyst in the foundation of the Blackheath Society, which continues to campaign for the preservation of the character and quality of the area).

== Sport ==
Blackheath Proprietary School
- Founded: 1856
- Dissolved: 1907; 119 years ago
- Ground: Blackheath Common
Home colours

The school was also famed for its enthusiastic participation in football, which at the time of the school's inception in 1830, had yet to find a uniform code of play, and neither association or rugby had yet been formalised. The style of football that had become increasingly popular since its inception at Rugby School was played by the Proprietary School, as well as the style tending towards the dribbling game, represented to an extent by Eton's code and which would be set down formally in Cambridge rules in 1848. However, even the apparent acceptance of these rule sets for these two variations in the game did not avert controversy over the rules by which teams should play. With the exception of a rationalised and uniform football culture that was emerging in Sheffield in the 1850s, across the United Kingdom from club to club and school to school there was little agreement over the elements of a football game, be that the time it should take to play, the number of players in a side, or indeed whether running with the ball was illegal or not. Teams had to agree on rules before a match, or had to agree to play the code of each team for one half of the match each.

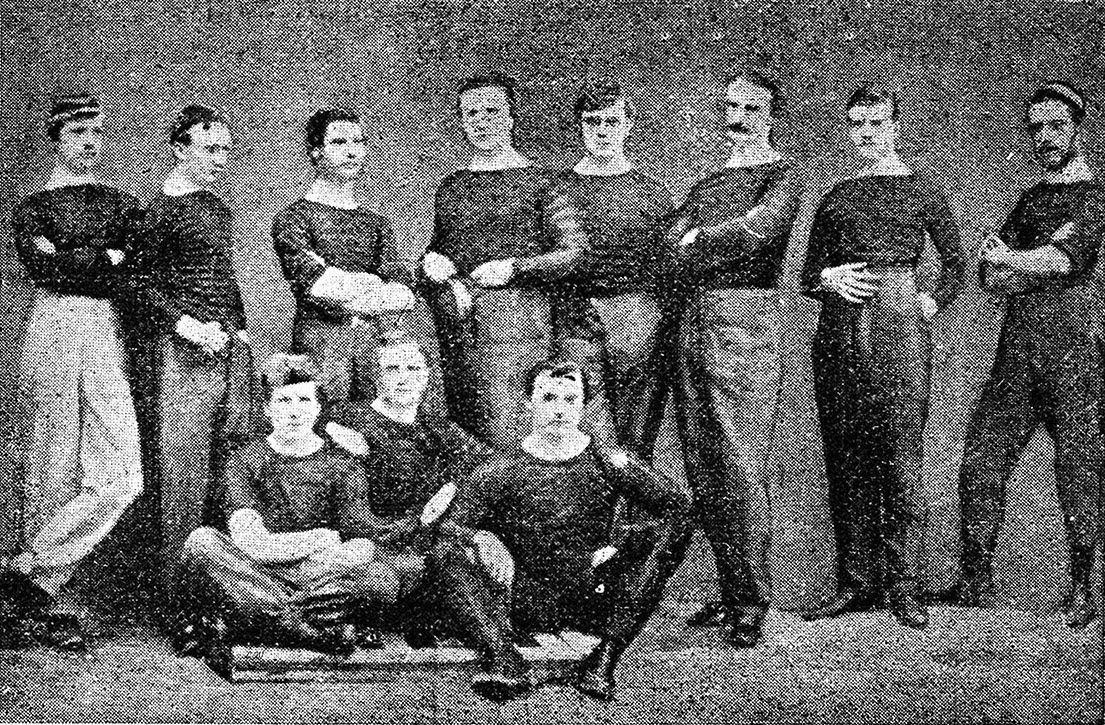
1862 team of Blackheath F.C., formed by old boys of Blackheath Proprietary School

In order to allow matches to take place without such constraints and problems, a number of captains and representatives from various London clubs met at Freemasons' Tavern in Lincoln's Inn Fields on 26 October 1863. Blackheath Proprietary School was one of the twelve teams represented (through the person of Mr. W. Gordon), and thus became a founder member of The Football Association. In that same meeting was represented Blackheath Football Club, a separate institution to the school but intrinsically linked to it for Blackheath FC was at its inception in 1858 the Old Blackheathens Club, where old boys of the school continued to play football together. This club was soon populated with men from other schools, notably Old Rugbeians who were now living and working in London. This club had the distinction of being both a founder member of The Football Association and the Rugby Football Union (RFU). Very soon after the FA had been established, rules for the football of the association were debated and formalised. A rift appeared between the advocates of the dribbling game and those of the handling game. When the revised Cambridge rules were adopted on 8 December 1863, which effectively prohibited "hacking" and "carrying", Blackheath FC and the Proprietary School immediately left the FA and were the driving force behind the setting up of the RFU in 1871.

== Notable former pupils ==
- Alfred William Alcock (1859–1933), physician naturalist and carcinologist.
- Charles Edward Beevor (1854–1908), neurologist.
- Edward Ernest Bowen (1836–1901), educationalist.
- Francis Maule Campbell, footballer, present at the founding of both The Football Association and the Rugby Football Union and pivotal in the latter's creation.
- Frank Cowper (1849–1930), yachtsman, writer and illustrator
- Sir Bryan Donkin, physician and criminologist.
- Sir Henry Mortimer Durand (1850–1924), diplomat and civil servant of colonial British India.
- John Fegan (1868–1949), Blackheath and England rugby union player.
- Sir Edward Fraser KCMG (1853 - 1927), England rugby union international and prominent Mauritius based businessman.
- George Joachim Goschen, First Viscount Goschen (1831–1907)
- Marshall Hall (1862–1915), English-born musician, conductor and poet.
- Thomas Woodbine Hinchliff (1825–1882), English mountaineer, traveller, and author.
- Campbell Richard Hone (1873–1967), Bishop of Wakefield in the first half of the 20th century.
- Frederick Schomberg Ireland (1860–1937), lawyer and cricketer.
- Sir Stuart Knill (1824–1898), Lord Mayor of London.
- James Leith (1826–1869), recipient of the Victoria Cross.
- Gerald Lightfoot (1877–1966), public servant and secretary of the Council for Scientific and Industrial Research.
- Surgeon-General William Manley, VC, CB (1831–1901), recipient of the Victoria Cross and Iron Cross.
- Francis Cornwallis Maude, VC, CB (1828–1900), recipient of the Victoria Cross.
- Donald McGill (1875–1962), English graphic artist.
- Alexander William Pearson (1854–1930), rugby union international for England from 1875 to 1878.
- Major Gen Sir Ernest Swinton (1868–1951), soldier, writer, military historian. Coined the use of the word "tank" to describe the first tracked armoured fighting vehicles.
- George Wrottesley (1827–1909), military Historian and second of son of John Wrottesley, 2nd Baron Wrottesley.
