= Keele (ward) =

Electoral ward in Newcastle-under-Lyme, Staffordshire, England

Coordinates: 52.997°N 2.275°W

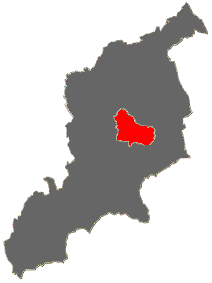
Location of the ward within Newcastle borough

Keele Ward is a local council ward in the borough of Newcastle-under-Lyme. It covers the village of Keele and the neighbouring University of Keele's campus. It has two local council positions.

Elections last occurred in May 2014. Its councillors are Wenslie Naylon from the Green Party and Tony Kearon from Labour.
