= Bradwell, Staffordshire =

Suburb of Newcastle-under-Lyme, England

Coordinates: 53.0422°N 2.2307°W

Bradwell
- Location within Staffordshire
- Population: 6,403 (2011 census.ward)
- OS grid reference: SJ846494
- District: Newcastle-under-Lyme
- Shire county: Staffordshire
- Region: West Midlands
- Country: England
- Sovereign state: United Kingdom
- Post town: NEWCASTLE
- Postcode district: ST5
- Dialling code: 01782
- Police: Staffordshire
- Fire: Staffordshire
- Ambulance: West Midlands
- UK Parliament: Newcastle-under-Lyme

Bradwell is a suburban area and council ward in the Borough of Newcastle-under-Lyme in Staffordshire. According to the 2001 Census, it had a population of 6,365, increasing to 6,403 at the 2011 Census. The motto of Bradwell is "We care, we share", and it is highlighted by a structure situated on the East side of the Bursley Way roundabout.

The suburb contains Bradwell Crematorium, in Chatterley Close. It was built by the Newcastle Borough Council, who still own the facility, and officially opened in February 1965. It is in 12 acres of landscaped grounds which include two fishponds near the chapel area. Most of the present landscaping development began in 1993 on what was previously open field, to create a series of twelve gardens of remembrance (one for each month of the year). The Council regularly enters the grounds as part of its contribution to the Britain in Bloom Competition.

Historically, Bradwell Fever Hospital was opened in 1886. This was expanded to include a 44 bed male sanatorium. The hospital was rebuilt in 1987.

== See also ==
- Listed buildings in Newcastle-under-Lyme
- Ralph Sneyd
- Keele Hall
