= Bryan Donkin (physician) =

British medical doctor

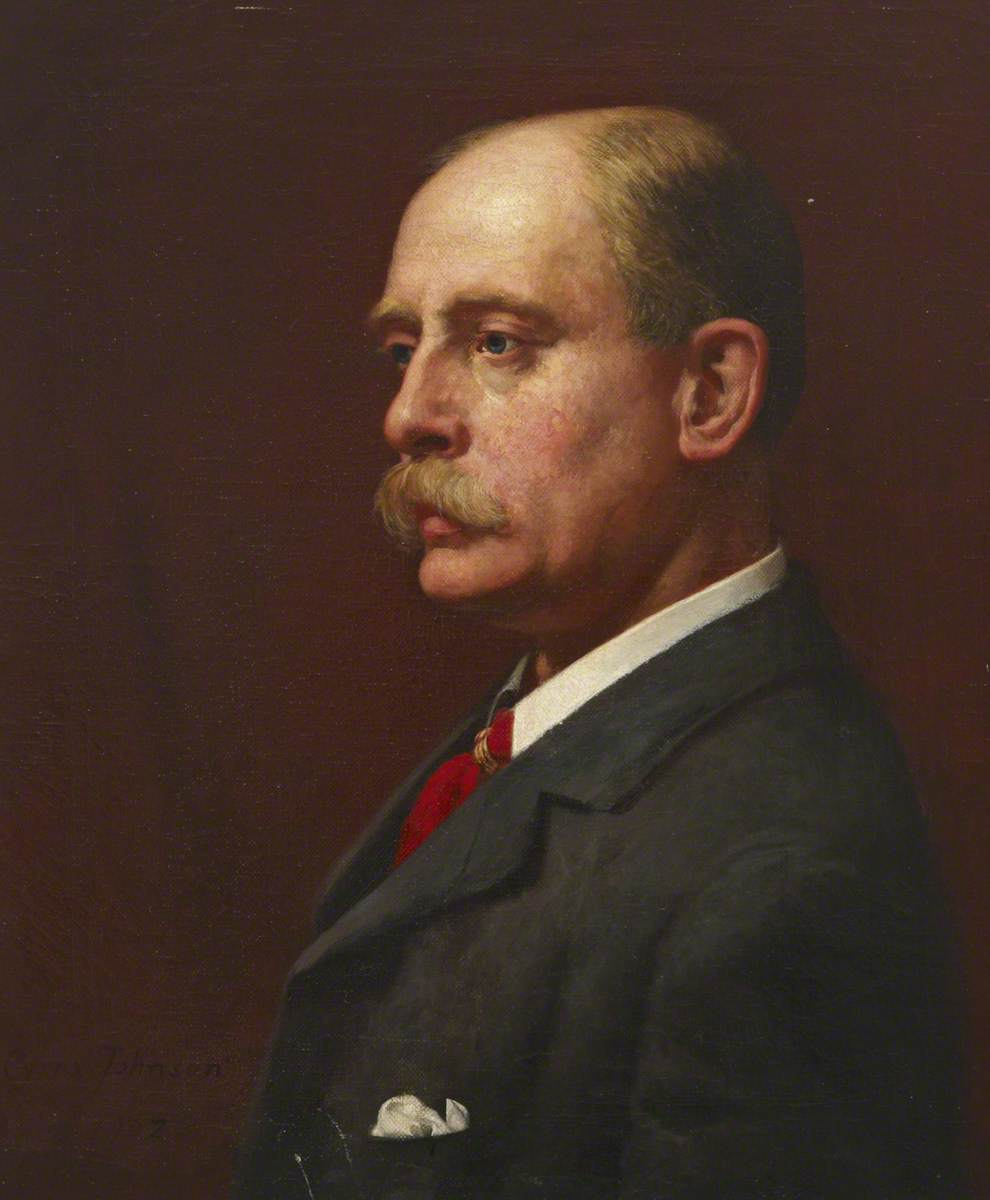
Donkin, 1902 painting by Cyrus Johnson

Sir Horatio Bryan Donkin FRCP (1 February 1845 – 26 July 1927) was a British medical doctor and criminologist. He spent his early career as a consultant physician and lecturer at Westminster Hospital before joining the prison service.

== Biography ==
Horatio Bryan Donkin was born on 1 February 1845 in Blackheath, the son of civil engineer Bryan Donkin (1809–1893) and grandson of the engineer and inventor Bryan Donkin (1768–1855).

He attended Blackheath Proprietary School and The Queen's College, Oxford, before graduating from St Thomas's Hospital Medical School in 1873. He held junior roles at St Thomas' Hospital and the City of London Hospital for Diseases of the Chest, and, in 1874, began working at Westminster Hospital, initially as an assistant physician and later becoming consultant physician, dean, and lecturer in clinical medicine.

He also served as physician to East London Hospital for Children and lectured at the London School of Medicine for Women. He became a Fellow of the Royal College of Physicians in 1880 and received an M.D. from Oxford in 1893.

Donkin was appointed a commissioner of prisons and director of convict prisons in 1898, resigning from his hospital posts. He was a member of the Royal Commission on Control of the Feeble-Minded in 1904–1908 and, upon retiring as commissioner, became medical adviser to the Prison Commission. He was interested in the psychology of crime, and viewed prisoners as if they were patients. He presented the Harveian Oration at the Royal College of Physicians in 1910, on the topic of "Inheritance of Mental Characters".

He was appointed a Knight Bachelor in 1911, the honour being conferred by George V at St James's Palace on 23 February.

A prominent member of the Savile Club, Donkin was also a rationalist and was involved with Ray Lankester in investigating and exposing spiritualists. He was friends with Karl Marx, and treated Marx, his wife Jenny von Westphalen, and their daughter Eleanor Marx. He died on 26 July 1927 in London.
