= Keele Preceptory =

Former monastic site in Staffordshire, England

- Interactive map of Keele Preceptory

Monastery information
- Order: Knights Templar
- Established: 1223
- Disestablished: 1538

Site
- Location: Keele, Staffordshire, England
- Coordinates: 53°00′00″N 2°16′13″W

Keele Preceptory was a preceptory (the headquarters of the order within a given geographical area), in Keele, Staffordshire, England. Owned by the Knights Templar until their suppression in the early 14th century, it then passed through a number of owners before falling into the hands of the Knights Hospitaller.

== History ==
=== Foundation ===
The estate was granted to the Knights Templar sometime between 1168-69 by King Henry II. The grant was further increased by Henry in 1185 with gifts of land in Onneley, near Madeley, worth some 2 shillings. The estate became a preceptory sometime in the 13th century and by 1308 they were collecting rents from property held in Newcastle-under-Lyme, Onneley, Stanton, and Nantwich.

=== Suppression ===
In 1307, Pope Clement V issued the papal bull Pastoralis Praeeminentiae calling on all European monarchs to arrest members of the Templar order. In response, the English Crown seized the order's property, including that belonging to Keele Preceptory. The land was first claimed by Thomas, 2nd Earl of Lancaster, in his capacity as lord of Newcastle-under-Lyme. Following his execution in 1322, it reverted to the Crown and was granted to the Knights Hospitaller in 1342, who combined it with their commandry in Halston, Shropshire.
