= Ralph Sneyd (landowner) =

English landowner, ironmaster, coalowner and railway developer

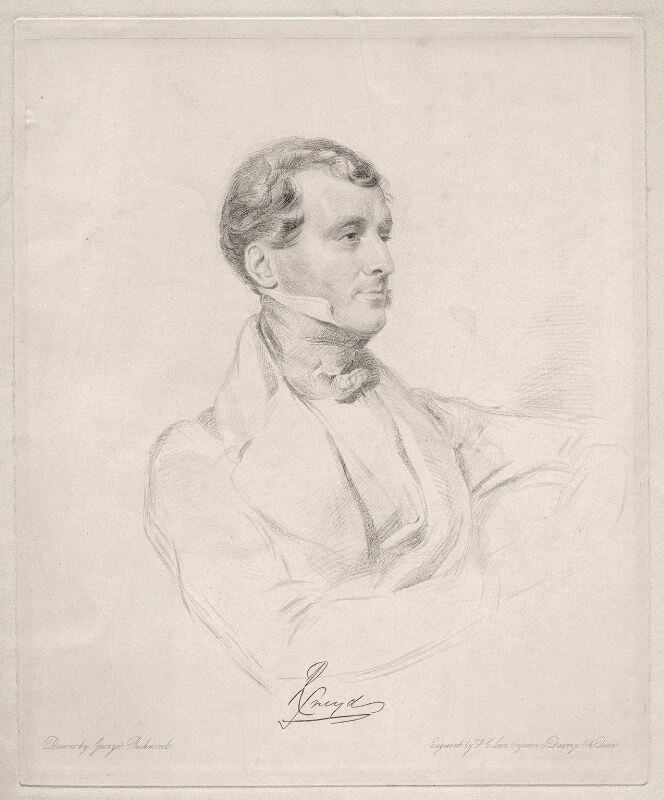
- Engraved portrait of Ralph Sneyd from 1842
- Born: 1793
- Died: 1870 (aged 76–77)
- Occupation: Landowner
- Parents: Walter Sneyd (father); Hon. Louisa Bagot (mother)

Ralph Sneyd (1793–1870) was an English landowner in Staffordshire, now best known for the rebuilding of Keele Hall. He was also an ironmaster, coalowner and railway developer, and was High Sheriff of Staffordshire in 1844.

== Early life ==
He was the eldest son of Walter Sneyd, Member of Parliament for Castle Rising, and his wife Louisa Bagot, daughter of William Bagot, 1st Baron Bagot. He was educated at Eton College. During the early part of the Napoleonic Wars, his father was an officer in the Staffordshire Militia, from 1805 the King's Own (1st Staffordshire) Militia, a name it received from King George III who showed a high regard for this unit which had the task of guarding his residences. Lord Ronald Gower wrote:

Mr. Sneyd had been a great courtier when he was a boy at Eton. His parents lived at Windsor when his father was attached to the court. George III. had given him a Latin Grammar, and he was quite an ardent admirer of that Monarch.

Sneyd matriculated at Christ Church, Oxford in 1811. A friend from school and college days was John FitzGibbon, 2nd Earl of Clare, with whom Sneyd kept up a long and active correspondence. Sarah Wedgwood, widow of Josiah Wedgwood, encountered Sneyd socially in 1813, and wrote in a letter

We had a good deal of literary conversation, as Mr Sneyd has a very pretty smattering of literary topics and a good deal of taste, though a little affected [...]

In 1817, Harriet Leveson-Gower, Countess Granville wrote to Georgiana Morpeth that "Ralph Sneyd is very entertaining. He has drawn me a head of Rogers upon the body of a wasp that is the best thing I ever saw."

In an 1823 by-election for Staffordshire, Sneyd was pressed by Lord Dudley to stand as a Tory. His father was unconvinced of the wisdom of the move, and in the end Sir John Wrottesley was elected unopposed. In Honiton in the 1826 general election, Sneyd did stand in a tight politically complex contest, with the backing of local independents Christopher Flood and Philip Mules. He came third in the two-member constituency, to John Josiah Guest and Harry Baines Lott. At this period his friends George Agar-Ellis and George Fortescue were both in parliament, with more liberal views. Sneyd did, however, favour Catholic emancipation.

== Landowner ==
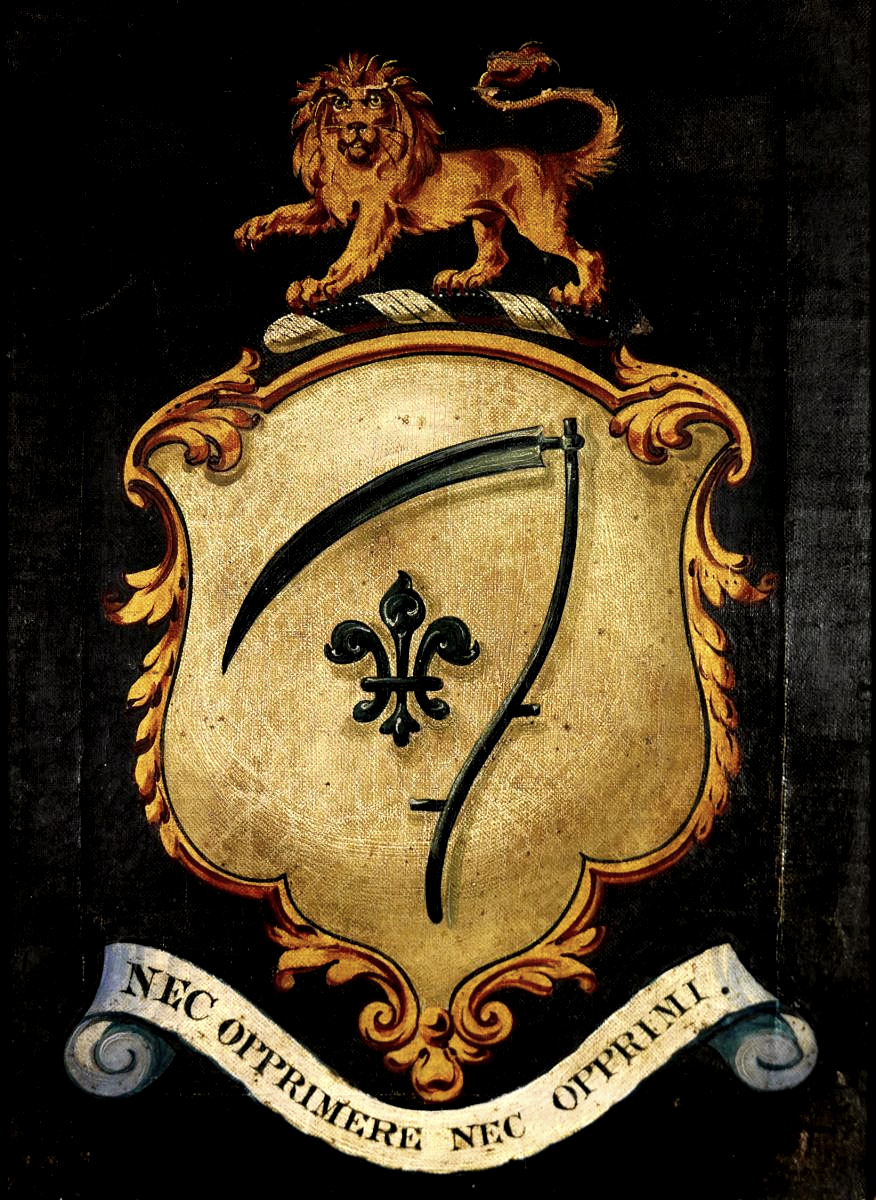
Sneyd arms, used decoratively on buildings in Keele, on a panel from 1829 at Keele Hall

Sneyd inherited the Keele Hall estate from his father in 1829. Walter Sneyd had brought down a heavy burden of encumbering debt on the land from the beginning of the 19th century. Ralph brought in Edward Blore to work on buildings that are now part of Keele University, in 1830–1833. He developed the garden from about 1830, planting on a large scale, and was noted particularly for his use of crosses of Rhododendron arboreum. He brought in William Sawrey Gilpin from the start to advise on his gardens, as he wrote to Agar-Ellis in September 1829.

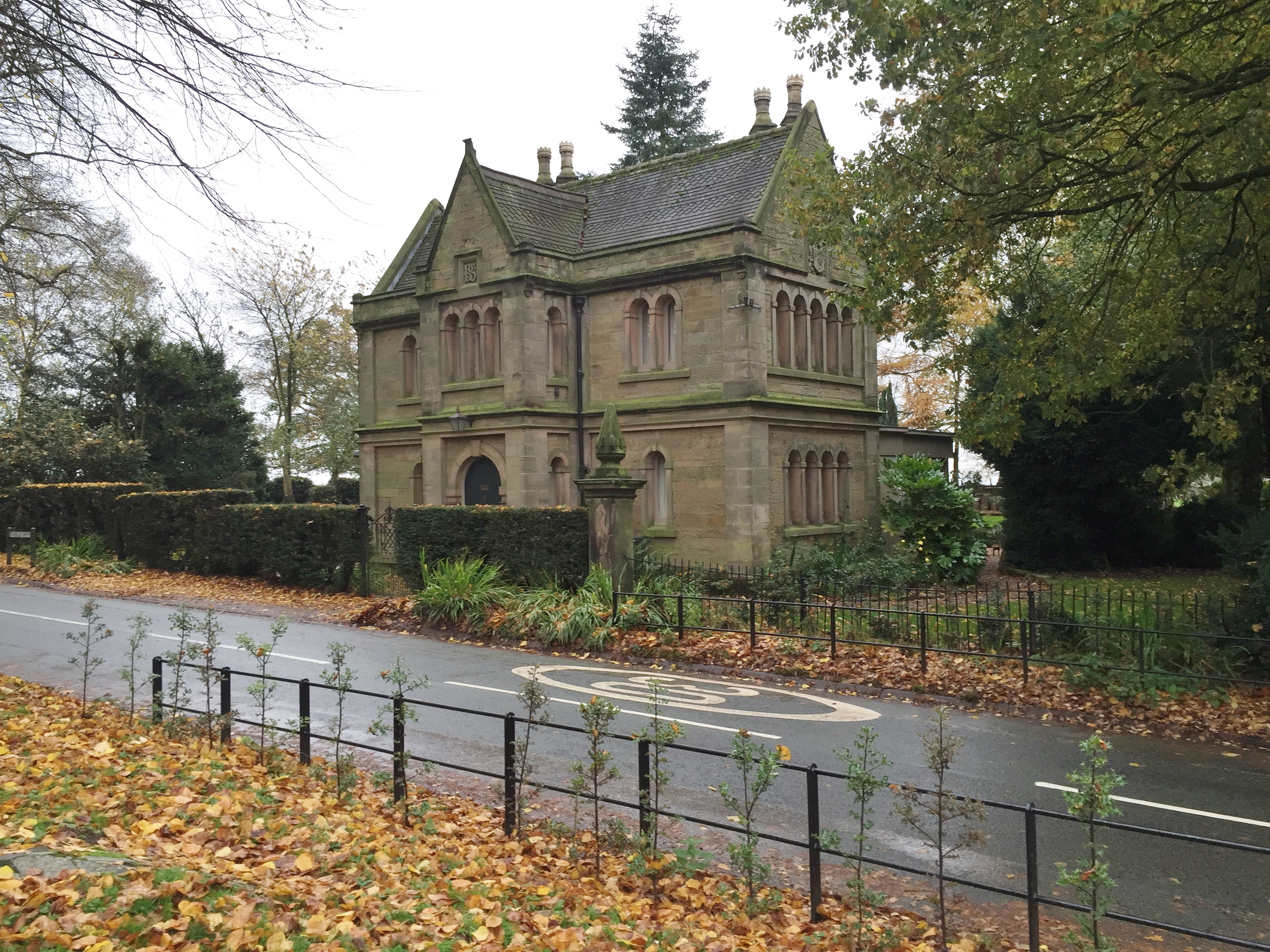
Keele Lodge, 2015 photograph, showing the RS monograph of Ralph Sneyd on one gable, and the Sneyd arms just visible on the right-hand gable

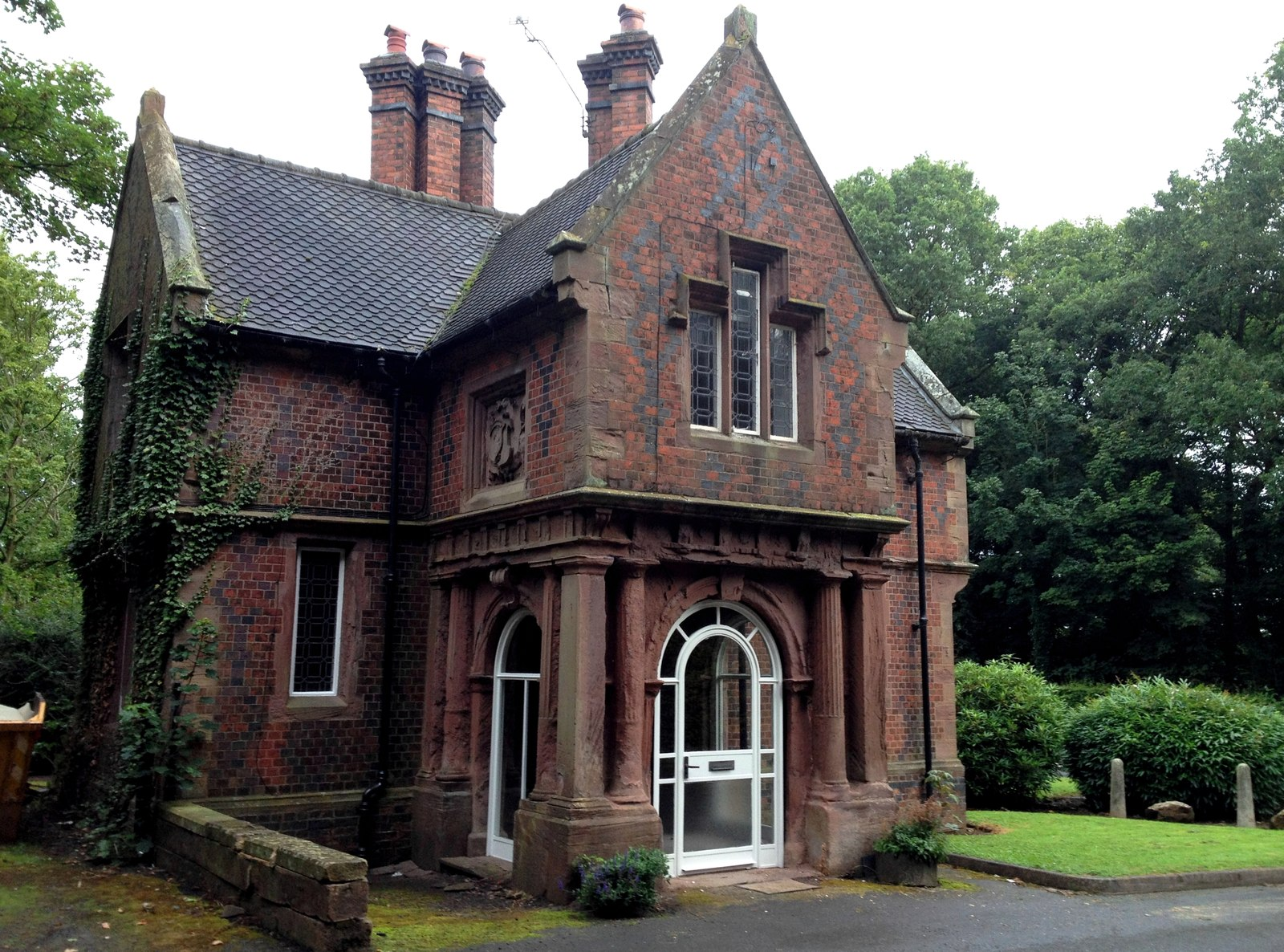
Keele University Lodge, with the Sneyd arms on the left side of the gable

Charles Adderley encountered Sneyd around the end of 1840 as a guest at Sandon, at the time when he was recruited as a candidate for North Staffordshire. He commented on the Tory trio, made up by Lord Sandon and Sir Charles Bagot, of "most highly cultivated and refined companions".

Buying further land, Sneyd had purchased over 2,000 acres (810 ha) by 1848, taking on debt. The land of the village of Keele was all in his hands by 1841, and he embarked there on building, displaying a monogram RS on works. He went into business mining coal, but without financial success. The death in 1848 of his agent Samuel Peake revealed poor administration of the coal company, which supplied Sneyd's ironworks at Knutton Heath, and a fresh start was made for the Silverdale Colliery.

In 1848 Sneyd on the recommendation of Charles Arbuthnot hired Andrew Thompson to run his estate, who over the following 21 years introduced improved farming methods. Mid-century, he spent on "seeding down" — the process of investing in turf better for cattle grazing – by providing seeds to his tenants. In 1850 he hired William Hill as head gardener, on the advice of George Fleming of Trentham Hall, the Sutherland property some 5.5 miles (8.9 km) away. He also backed out of active management of business, as an ironmaster. In 1848 he leased to Francis Stanier the older (died 1856), a solicitor of Newcastle-under-Lyme, his coal mines and ironworks. Stanier went on to develop them at Apedale, Knutton and Silverdale. Sneyd as landlord built a private railway line from Silverdale to Newcastle, in 1849. Then in 1852 the North Staffordshire Railway built a line that made a junction with Sneyd's at Knutton.

Sneyd had Anthony Salvin remodel Keele Hall over the period 1854–1860, a well-regarded conversion in line with Sneyd's bachelor tastes. In 1858 he recommended Wheatstone's House Telegraph to a friend.

== Collector ==
Sneyd was a client of the antique furniture dealer Edward Holmes Baldock of London. He bought around 1835 an annotated copy of Johnson's Dictionary, a sought-after first edition that later went via Maggs Bros Ltd to the collector Richard Gimbel. At the Strawberry Hill House sale in 1842, he bought Horace Walpole's copy of William Maitland's History of Edinburgh. He was a keen collector of manuscripts.

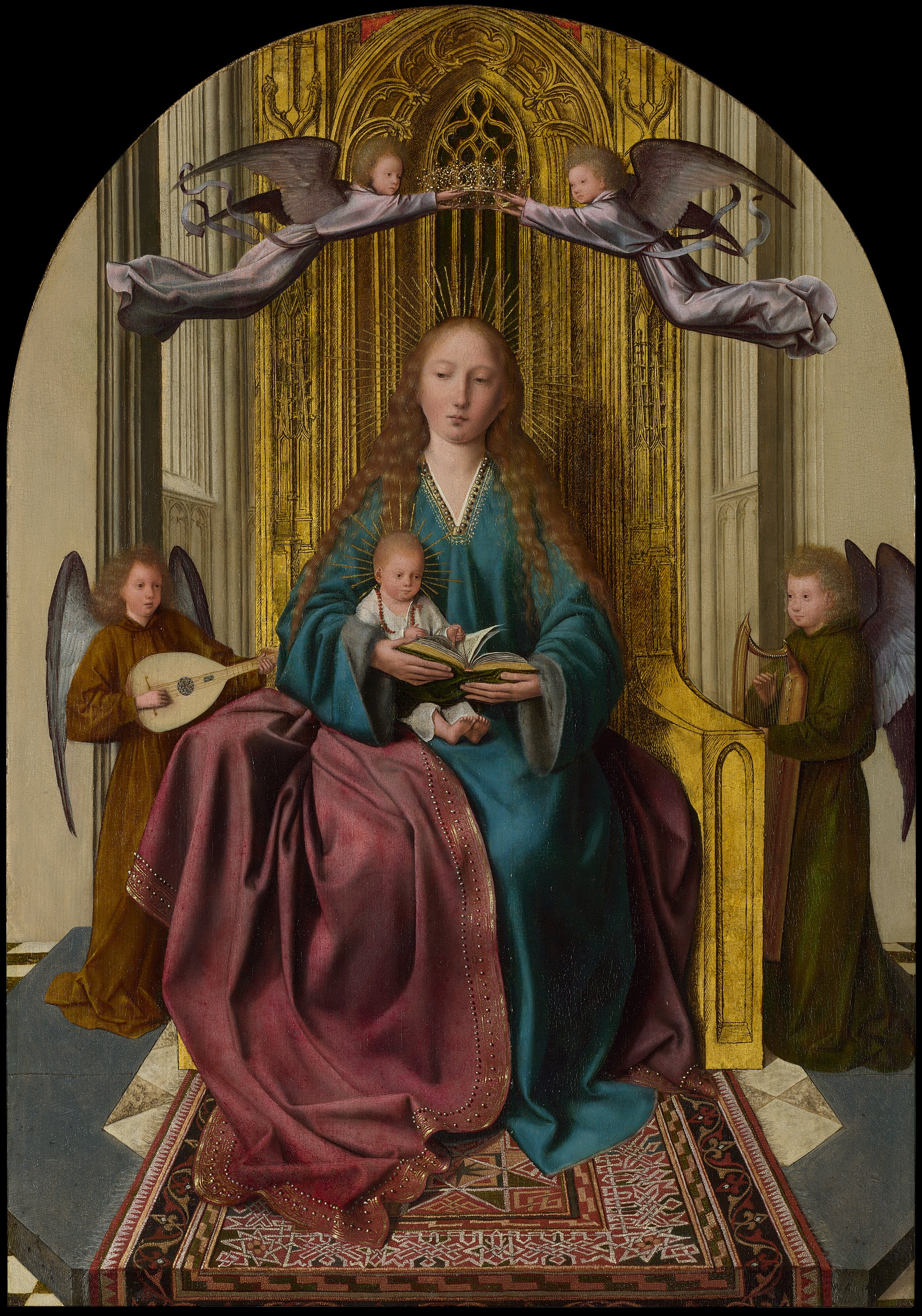
The Virgin and Child Enthroned, with Four Angels by Quinten Massys, now in the National Gallery, London, came from the Sneyd family collection, and its acquisition is tentatively dated to a journey by Sneyd in France and the Netherlands in 1828

In common with Lord Francis Egerton and Richard Ford, Sneyd used the art dealer Alessandro Aducci in Rome.

== Legacy ==
Sneyd was unmarried, and on his death, the Keele Hall estate passed to his brother Walter; and then to his nephew Ralph Sneyd (1863–1949). The Hall was rented by Grand Duke Michael Mikhailovich of Russia from 1901 to 1910.

The Keele Hall library was put up for auction in 1903, as Walter Sneyd's collection of illuminated manuscripts and early printed books. Many of the manuscripts passed to Charles Fairfax Murray. The Johnson's Dictionary came up for sale in 1927.
