= Clifton Wrottesley =

Irish skeleton racer and peer (born 1968)

The Right Honourable The Lord Wrottesley
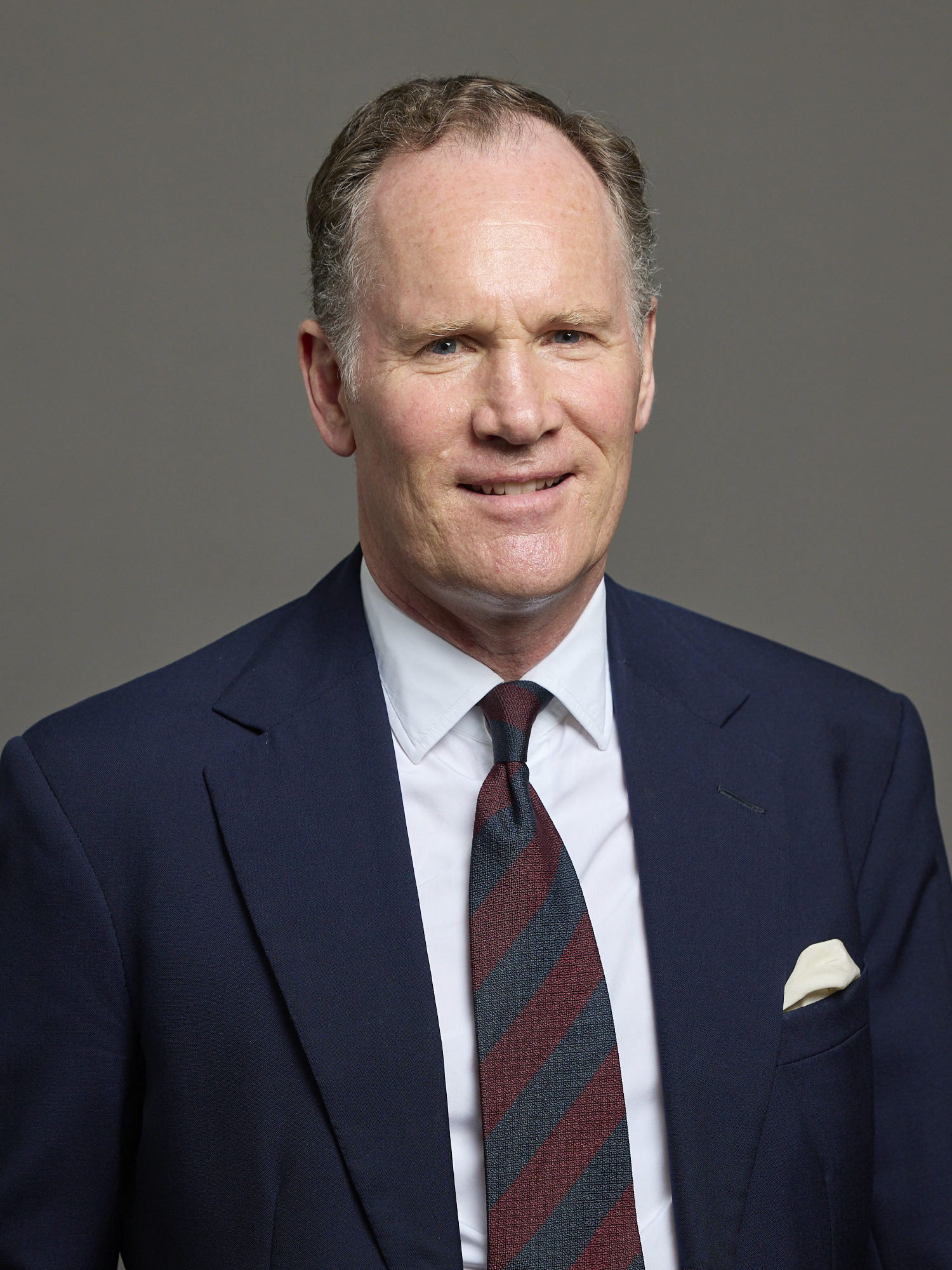
- Official portrait, 2025

Member of the House of Lords
- Lord Temporal
- Hereditary peerage 26 May 1993 – 11 November 1999
- Preceded by: The 5th Baron Wrottesley
- Succeeded by: Seat abolished
- Elected Hereditary Peer; 11 July 2022 – 29 April 2026
- By-election: 2022
- Preceded by: The 3rd Baron Swinfen
- Succeeded by: Seat abolished

Personal details
- Born: Clifton Hugh Lancelot de Verdon Wrottesley; 10 August 1968 (age 57) Dublin, Ireland
- Party: Conservative
- Spouse: Sascha Schwarzenbach
- Children: 4
- Parent(s): Hon. Richard Francis Gerard Wrottesley; Georgina Clifton
- Relatives: Urs Schwarzenbach (father-in-law)
- Education: Eton College
- Alma mater: Edinburgh University; Sandhurst

Clifton Hugh Lancelot de Verdon Wrottesley, 6th Baron Wrottesley (born 10 August 1968) is an Irish and British peer and former Conservative member of the House of Lords. He represented Ireland in men's skeleton at the 2002 Winter Olympics, finishing fourth.

== Early life and education ==
Wrottesley was born at Hatch Street, Dublin, in 1968 to Hon. Richard Francis Gerard Wrottesley, eldest surviving son of 5th Baron Wrottesley. His mother was Georgina Anne Clifton, daughter of Lt.-Col. Peter Thomas Clifton, late Grenadier Guards, of Dummer House, Hampshire, and Patricia Mary Adela, sister of David Gibson-Watt, Baron Gibson-Watt. Through his paternal grandmother, he is a descendant of the Stratford family, and through his maternal grandfather the Bruce baronets of Downhill.

His first two years were spent in Abbyknockmoy, County Galway. After his father's death, he moved to Spain with his mother.

He was educated at Eton College, the University of Edinburgh and Royal Military Academy Sandhurst before serving in the Grenadier Guards.

He inherited the Wrottesley titles in 1977 on the death of his grandfather, his father having died when he was two. He became eligible to sit in the House of Lords on his 21st birthday.

== Career ==
Wrottesley works in property and fine wine.

Wrottesley was Chair of British Skeleton from 2012 to 2017, was a board member of the British Bobsleigh and Skeleton Association (BBSA) from 2012 to 2019, and Chair from 2012 to 2014. He continues to be involved in overseeing the British Skeleton World Class Programme, and Chairs the Selection Committee.

In March 2021, Wrottesley was appointed Chair of Ice Hockey UK (IHUK), and in January 2022 was appointed to the International Ice Hockey Federation (IIHF) Finance Committee for a period of five years.

== Sporting career ==
=== Skeleton ===
Wrottesley competed as an Irish skeleton racer on the Fédération Internationale de Bobsleigh et de Tobogganing (FIBT, now the International Bobsleigh and Skeleton Federation or IBSF) Skeleton Continental circuits in the 2000–01 season and the FIBT World Cup circuit in the 2001–02 season. He finished fourth in the men's skeleton at the 2002 Winter Olympics. As of 2022, this remains the best result of any Irish athlete at the Olympic Winter Games.

Wrottesley and his father both competed in bobsleigh for Great Britain before competing for Ireland.

During the 2006 Winter Olympics in Turin, he served as Chef de Mission for the Irish team.

=== Cresta Run ===
Wrottesley is also a rider of the Cresta Run, St Moritz, Switzerland. He has ridden on the Run since the 1988–89 season, won his Cresta colours in 1996, and has won many of the Open races since his first victory in 1997 (although he did not compete on the Run in the 2000–01 and 2001–02 seasons, due to commitments on the IBSF Skeleton circuits).

Of the four Classic Races on the Cresta Run, Wrottesley has won The Curzon Cup (the Blue Riband event of the season from Junction) a record 14 times (beating Nino Bibbia's record of 8), The Morgan Cup a record 17 times (beating Franco Gansser's record of 10), The Brabazon Trophy a record 16 times and the Grand National (the Blue Riband event of the season from Top) a record 18 times (beating Nino Bibbia and Franco Gansser's record of 8).

Wrottesley has also won The Grand Slam a record six times (all 4 Classic races in the one season), in 2003, 2005, 2006, 2010, 2012 and 2023.

Wrottesley holds the record for the number of Classic races won with a total of 65 to date, was the first person to break the 50 second barrier (on 1 February 2015) and in doing so holds the World Record from Top (49.92 seconds). Wrottesley also holds the Flying Junction Record (31.44 seconds).

== Personal life ==
He lives in St Moritz, Switzerland, and Henley-on-Thames, England. He is married to Sascha Wrottesley (née Schwarzenbach), the daughter of Urs Schwarzenbach, the Swiss billionaire financier. The couple have four children: three sons and a daughter.

After voluntary declarations by Wrottesley to HM Revenue and Customs, HMRC issued tax demands for 2000 to 2008 on the basis that Wrottesley was domiciled in the UK. Wrottesley has appealed, contending that his domicile of origin is in the Republic of Ireland. The first-tier tribunal issued a preliminary ruling but as of 2014 had not issued a final decision in the case, so the matter is effectively in abeyance.

== Political career ==
Removed from the House of Lords in 1999 under the provisions of the House of Lords Act which abolished hereditary peers' automatic memberships, Baron Wrottesley won a by-election to the House of Lords in 2022, taking the place of Roger Swinfen Eady, 3rd Baron Swinfen.

Peerage of the United Kingdom
Preceded by Richard John Wrottesley	Baron Wrottesley; 1977–present Member of the House of Lords (1993–1999)	Incumbent; Heir apparent: Hon. Victor Wrottesley
Baronetage of England
Preceded by Richard John Wrottesley	Wrottesley baronets 1977–present	Incumbent; Heir apparent: Hon. Victor Wrottesley
Parliament of the United Kingdom
Preceded by The Lord Swinfen	Elected hereditary peer to the House of Lords under the House of Lords Act 1999; 2022–2026	Position abolished under the House of Lords (Hereditary Peers) Act 2026
