= Listed buildings in Perton =

Perton is a civil parish in the district of South Staffordshire, Staffordshire, England. It contains nine listed buildings that are recorded in the National Heritage List for England. All the listed buildings are designated at Grade II, the lowest of the three grades, which is applied to "buildings of national importance and special interest". The parish contains the village of Perton and an area to the northwest. The major building in the parish is Wrottesley Hall, which is listed, together with associated structures. The other listed buildings include a farmhouse, a cottage, a barn, a dovecote, and a milepost.

== Buildings ==
Name and location	Photograph	Date	Notes
Barn, Trescott Farm; 52.57097°N 2.22626°W	—	17th century	The barn is timber framed with brick infill, weatherboarding, and a tile roof. There are six bays, and the barn contains a central carriageway, doorways, and a casement window.
The Thatched Cottage; 52.57078°N 2.22490°W	—	17th century	The cottage is timber framed with brick infill, and has a thatched roof. There is one storey and an attic, two bays, and a lean-to brick extension to the left painted to resemble timber framing. In the centre is a doorway, and the windows are casements. Inside there is an inglenook fireplace.
Trinity Cottage; 52.58563°N 2.21251°W	—	17th century	A farmhouse, later a private house, it has been altered and extended. The original part is timber framed with brick infill, the extension is in brick, and the roof is tiled. There are two storeys and a T-shaped plan, consisting of a two-bay hall range, a projecting gabled cross-wing to the left, a later single-bay extend ion further to the left, and a low extension to the right. The windows are casements.
Wrottesley Hall, west terrace and steps 52.61277°N 2.22323°W		1689	A country house that was largely altered and restored in the 19th century following a fire. It is in red brick on a sandstone plinth with quoins and a hipped tile roof. There is a U-shaped plan, and a main range of two storeys and three bays, with a floor band, and a pediment containing a coat of arms. In the centre, steps lead up to a doorway that has a fanlight and a hood on console brackets, and the windows are sashes with moulded surrounds. Flanking the central range are two-bay links to two-bay pavilions with hipped roofs, all with single-storeys and basements, and containing sash windows. To the left is a small fight of steps leading to a terrace.
Ice house, Wrottesley Hall; 52.61338°N 2.22161°W	—	18th century	The ice house, which is to the west of the coach house, is in brick, and consists of a cone with an open top.
Coach House, Wrottesley Hall; 52.61302°N 2.22157°W	—	Late 18th century	The coach house, which was converted for residential use in about 1985, is in red brick with stucco dressings, and slate roofs with coped gables. There are two storeys, and the middle two bays projecting under a gable. In the ground floor are sash windows with rusticated lintels, above are semicircular windows with stucco surrounds, and above them is a metal clock face. To the left is a six-bay wing with segmental-headed openings in the ground floor and semicircular windows above, and further to the left is a projecting two-bay wing. To the right of the central block are six bays containing sash and casement windows, and a main doorway with a fanlight and a bracketed hood; all these have rusticated lintels.
Threshing barn, Wrottesley Hall; 52.61428°N 2.21990°W	—	1785	The barn was extended in about 1800 and partly used for other purposes. It is in red brick with a dentilled eaves cornice, and a tile roof with coped gables. The barn contains two segmental-headed entrances, a window, a stable door, and perforated bricks for ventilation, and to the rear right is a lower extension.
Milepost at N.G.R. SO 83929689; 52.56949°N 2.23888°W		Early 19th century	The milepost is on the southeast side of the A454 road. It is in cast iron and has a triangular plan with a chamfered top. On the top is "TATTENHALL" and the other faces indicate the distances to Bridgnorth and Wolverhampton.
Dovecote, South Perton Farm; 52.58479°N 2.21221°W	—	c. 1851 (probable)	The dovecote and poultry house are in red brick and engineering brick, and have a pyramidal tile roof with a cupola and a weathervane. The building contains perforated vents, a door and a chicken hatch.
