= Keele Hall =

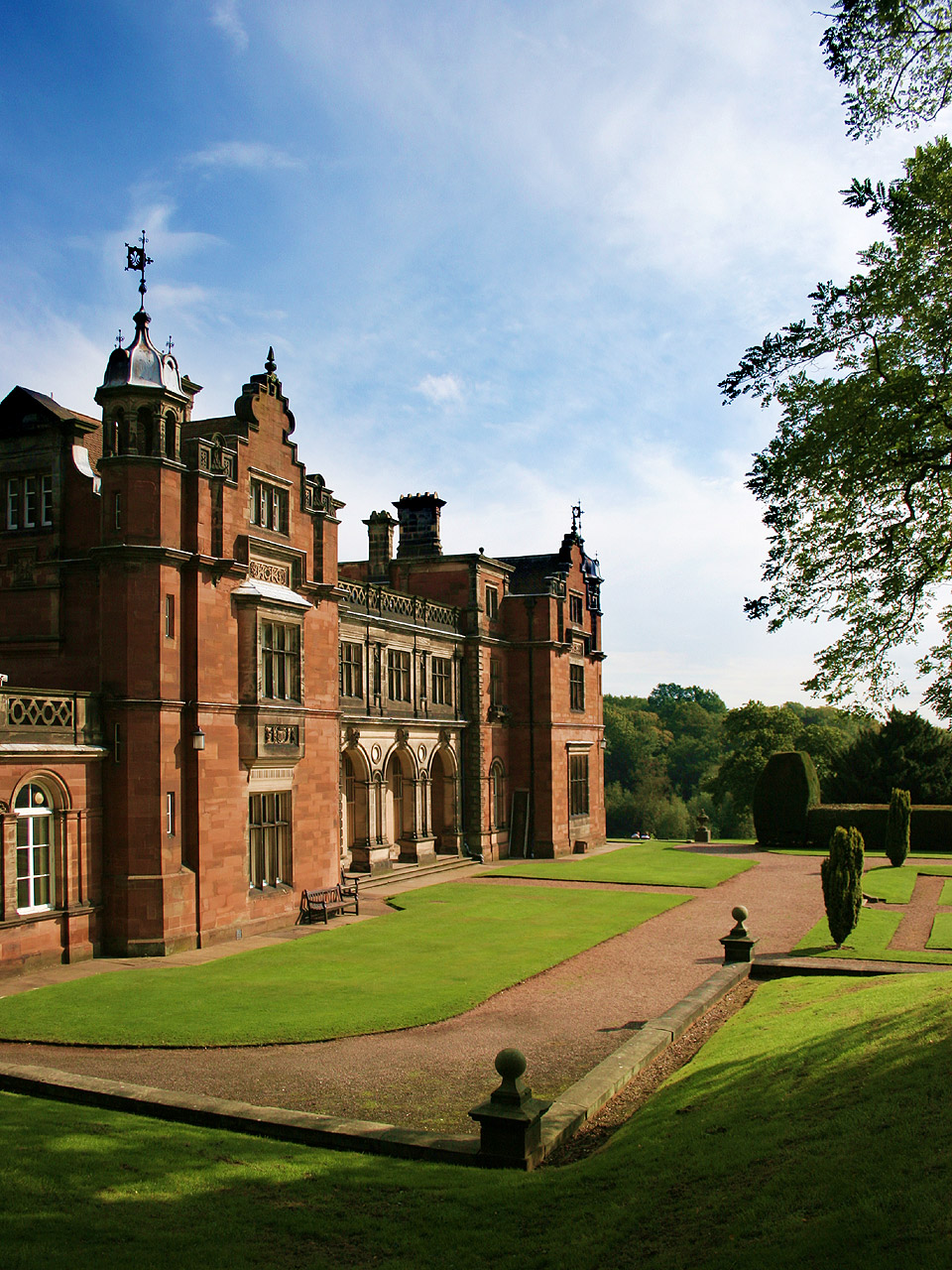

- Location in Staffordshire
- 52.9998°N 2.2704°W
- Location: Keele, Staffordshire

History
- Built: c.1851
- Built for: Ralph Sneyd

Site notes
- Architect: Anthony Salvin

Listed Building – Grade II*
- Designated: 2 December 1952
- Reference no.: 1377615

Keele Hall is a 19th-century mansion house at Keele, Staffordshire, England, now standing on the campus of Keele University and serving as the university conference centre. It is a Grade II* listed building.

== History ==
=== Early history ===
The manor of Keele was purchased by the Sneyd family in 1544, a Staffordshire gentry family who held the mayoralty of the borough of Newcastle-under-Lyme several times as well as lands in nearby Audley and Bradwell. In about 1580 Ralph Sneyd built a large gabled Tudor style house there. The family prospered as coal (in nearby Silverdale, Staffordshire) and iron owners and also brick and tile manufacturers. During the English Civil War, Keele Hall was, allegedly, briefly instrumental is providing an asylum for King Charles II after the Battle of Worcester in 1651. As royalist supporters, following the final Parliamentarian victory, the Sneyd family were heavily fined.

=== New hall ===
The hall was inherited by Ralph Sneyd in 1829, following the death of his father. By the mid-19th century the hall was in a derelict state. In 1851 the old house was demolished and replaced with the current Jacobethan design by architect Anthony Salvin, possibly to emulate the neighbouring estate at Crewe Hall. English architect William Eden Nesfield described Keele Hall as:

One of the best planned houses of its time and drew attention to the way it was adapted to the slope on which it stood

— Jill Allibone, Anthony Salvin: Pioneer of Gothic Revival Architecture

The park was landscaped around 1768–70 by William Emes, who added to or enlarged existing ponds and planted trees to conceal what remained working farms in the park. Its main natural feature is the wooded valley with ponds running south-east from Keele Hall to Springpool Wood at the park's southern extremity, abutting the M6 motorway. The pool in that wood was originally a hammer pond serving a forge.

==== Grand Duke Michael Mikhailovich of Russia ====
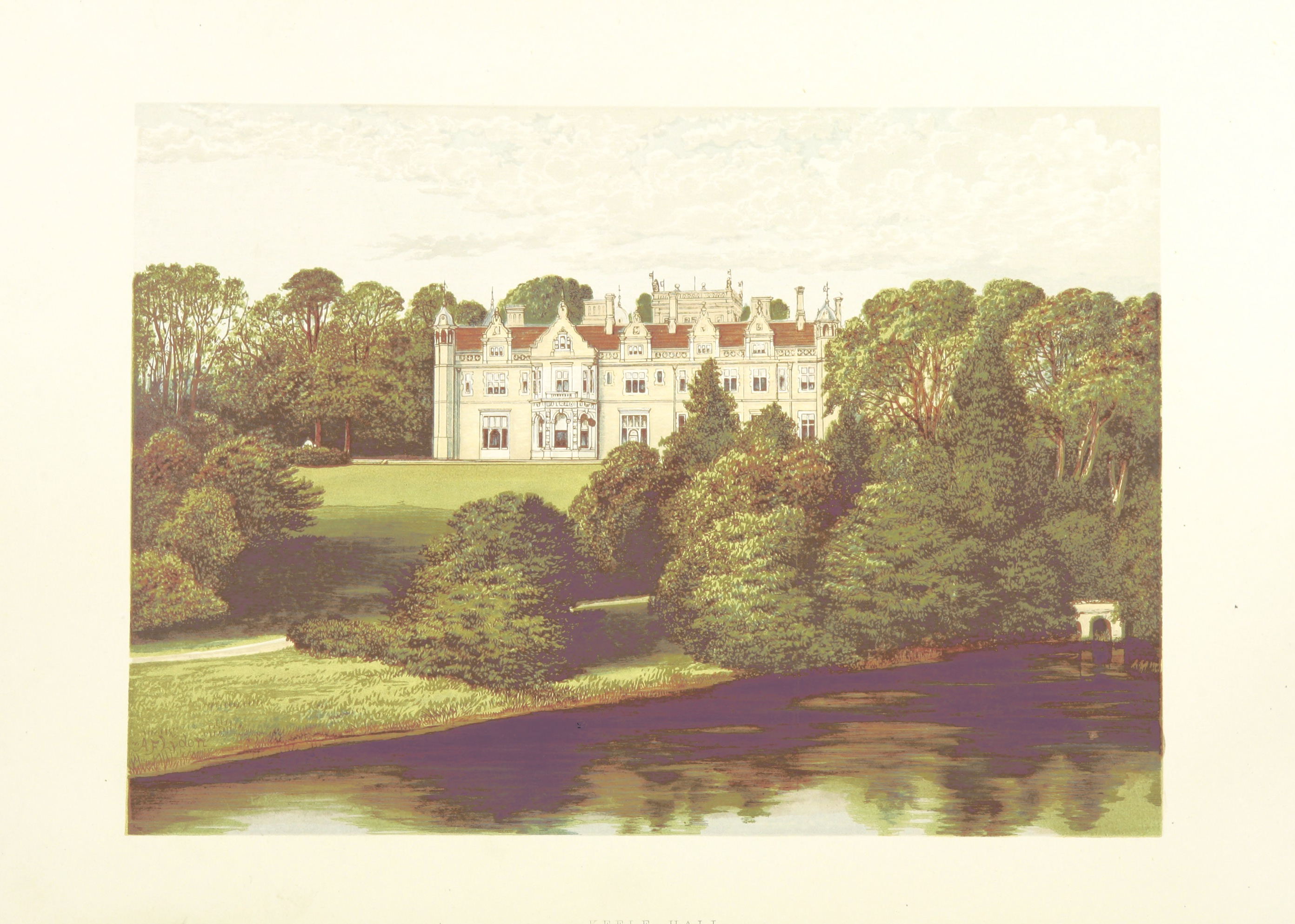
Keele Hall south facade, 1879

With the fortunes of the Sneyd family in decline, the hall was let to Grand Duke Michael Mikhailovich of Russia, a son of Grand Duke Michael Nicolaievich of Russia and a grandson of Tsar Nicholas I of Russia, and his wife Countess Sophie von Merenberg, between 1900 and 1909. They had contracted a morganatic marriage that meant they would spend the rest of their lives living in exile in England, France and Germany. The couple entertained frequently at Keele Hall, and guests included Sophie's father Prince Nikolaus Wilhelm of Nassau, Prince Francis of Teck, Prince Pyotr Sviatopolk-Mirsky and Russian ambassador Count Alexander von Benckendorff. In 1901, King Edward VII visited whilst visiting the Duke of Sutherland, whose residence was the nearby Trentham Hall. During the ten years the Grand Duke lived at Keele Hall, he took up the life of an English country gentleman. The couple were popular with the local population, regularly visiting the local school in Keele village. The town council of Newcastle-under-Lyme conferred on Michael the distinction of Lord High Steward of the borough in 1902.

=== 1945-Present ===
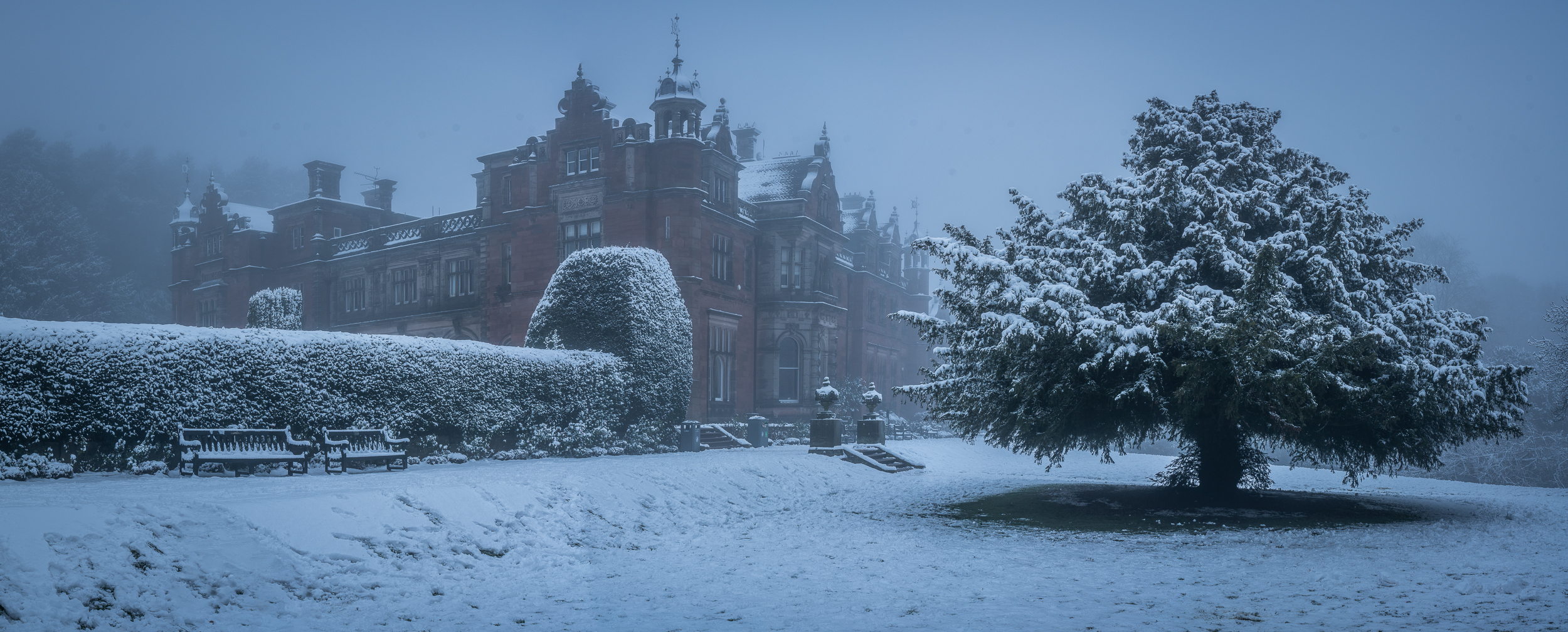
Keele Hall in the snow, 2023

The Hall was requisitioned by the army during World War II. In 1948, with the aid of grant funding, the Keele estate was sold by the Sneyd family for the establishment of the University College of North Staffordshire, which in 1962 became Keele University. Keele Hall is used to host conferences, events and weddings.

== Architecture ==
=== Exterior ===
The house is constructed from red and yellow sandstone ashlar with rusticated quoins. Designed to a roughly L-shape plan, the style is Jacobean Revival. Built around a courtyard, it consists of three stories with cellars. To one side of the courtyard is a more simply built service wing.

=== Interior ===
The interiors of the state rooms are decorated in a mixture of styles, including Louis XVI style and Renaissance Revival. Some rooms are influenced by the works of English architect William Kent. The Tudor Revival dining room features tapestries from the Aubusson Manufactory and carvings in the style of Grinling Gibbons. The dining room is now used by Keele University as the university common room.

== See also ==
- Grade II* listed buildings in Newcastle-under-Lyme (borough)
- Listed buildings in Keele

== Literature ==
- J. M. Kolbert: The Sneads & Keele Hall, University of Keele, 1967.
