= Curson baronets =

Extinct baronetcy in the Baronetage of England

The Curson Baronetcy, of Water Perry in the County of Oxford, was a title in the Baronetage of England. It was created on 30 April 1661 for Thomas Curson. The title became extinct on the death of the fourth Baronet in 1765. The Viscounts Scarsdale and Earls Howe are members of another branch of this family.

== Curson baronets, of Water Perry (1661) ==
- Sir Thomas Curson, 1st Baronet (1611–1682)
- Sir John Curson, 2nd Baronet (c. 1657–1727)
- Sir Francis Curson, 3rd Baronet (c. 1678–1750)
- Sir Peter Curson, 4th Baronet (1687–1765)

== See also ==
- Curzon baronets of Kedlaston, Derbyshire
