= Sir John Wrottesley, 8th Baronet =

British army officer and politician (1744-1787)

Sir John Wrottesley, 8th Baronet (22 December 1744 – 23 April 1787), of Wrottesley Hall in Staffordshire, was a British Army officer and politician who was a Member of the British House of Commons from 1768 to 1787.

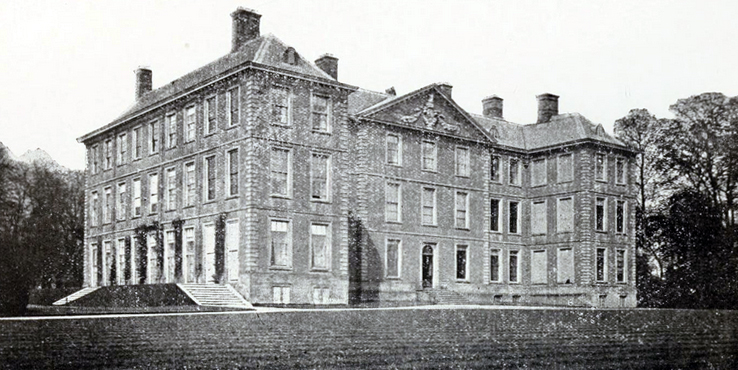
Wrottesley Hall.

== Background and early life ==
Wrottesley was the eldest son of the Reverend Sir Richard Wrottesley, 7th Baronet, Dean of Worcester, and Mary, the daughter of John Leveson-Gower, 1st Earl Gower. He had five sisters, including Elizabeth Wrottesley. His maternal grandfather was head of the most powerful Whig political dynasty in Staffordshire, based at Trentham Hall: the Leveson-Gowers controlled a number of seats in the unreformed House of Commons. In 1754, Gower died and was succeeded by Wrottesley's uncle, Granville Leveson-Gower.

Wrottesley determined on an army career, being commissioned as ensign of the 2nd Foot Guards during 1761 and transferring as captain of the 85th Foot the next year. From 1766 to 1767, he was equerry to the Duke of York.

Wrottesley's political associations were strengthened when his uncle, Gower, joined the Cabinet as Lord President of the Council in 1767, and again two years later when his sister married the Prime Minister, the Duke of Grafton. However, Gower and Grafton belonged to different, often competing, factions of the shifting coalition that constituted the Whig party.

== Political career ==
Wrottesley was nominated for Parliament for the general election of 22 March 1768 by Earl Gower as member for Newcastle-under-Lyme. The borough was regarded as belonging to the Gower Leveson family, who owned much of the property and allowed the tenants to get into serious arrears, as well as providing lavish hospitality during elections. However, the borough had a large electorate and had recently been made less secure by the emergence of a malcontent group of electors, who invited Robert Clive to challenge the controlling interest. The challenge was unsuccessful and Wrottesley was returned unopposed, alongside Alexander Forrester, a major member of the Bedfordite faction of conservative Whigs, placed in the seat at the request of the Duke John Russell himself. The Gowers were now allied with the Duke of Bedford's faction and this was to determine most of Wrottesley's parliamentary career.

Only a month after the election, a vacancy occurred in Staffordshire, when one member, George Harry Grey, succeeded his father as Earl of Stamford. Grey had been a Gower nominee in this county constituency, where, by informal agreement, the Gowers nominated one member, while leaving the other seat for one of the local landed gentry. Wrottesley resigned as Member a couple of months later and was assigned to the vacancy by Gower, becoming MP for Staffordshire on 5 July 1768. He represented the county for the remainder of his life, always being returned unopposed.

At first Wrottesley almost invariably voted with the government. Such consistency could be achieved only by a political transformation, as the administration itself changed in 1770. For his first two years in Parliament, Wrottesley, the Gowers and the rest of the Bedfordites were involved with the Whig administration of Wrottesley's own brother-in-law, Grafton, a friend and supporter of William Pitt, 1st Earl of Chatham. The Chathamites favoured an aggressive, anti-French colonial policy, and Wrottesley had made his military career in pursuit of their objectives. Regarding the tensions in North America, however, the Chathamites tended to sympathise with the colonists. The Bedfordite Whigs increasingly adopted the opposite opinion. During the Tory administration of Frederick North, Lord North, from 1770 onwards, the Bedfordites were allied with the Tories. Wrottesley and the rest of the Gower clients thus changed sides, supporting a hard line against the Americans that led to the American Revolutionary War. Gower assumed control of the faction when Bedford died in 1771. Wrottesley was still a member of the Army and in 1770 had been promoted to lieutenant colonel. When hostilities began in 1775, he rejoined his regiment, retaining his membership in Parliament.

Wrottesley served for three years in the war, returning to England in 1778. By this time, France had formally intervened in the war on the side of the Americans. Wrottesley made his first parliamentary speech after his return on 26 November 1778, during the debate on the Address, which followed the Speech from the throne at the opening of Parliament.

"(Wrottesley) asked if the House was called upon for unanimity against France? If it was for a war with America, he could not give his approbation to it. All that could be done, he said, had been done. If 50,000 Russians were sent, they could do nothing. He thought New York, Rhode Island, and Halifax should be garrisoned, and the rest of the army brought away."

With a speech in December he elaborated his opinion, saying that the British forces were distributed too widely and the lines of communication too stretched for any offensive action. He was not for immediate withdrawal but it was too late for any offensive action. For a year he went no further in his criticisms and supported the government in most votes. However, in a speech on 6 December 1779 he was much more critical. Claiming he was no party man, he nevertheless told ministers:

"A change of measures was now become absolutely necessary. America was lost by their incapacity and misconduct, their obstinacy and their blindness."

Wrottesley's evolution followed that of the Bedfordites in general. At the end of 1779, Gower ended the faction's alliance with North, making the end of the government and the war likely. However, Wrottesley continued to support the government in general, voting against opposition attempts to control the expenses of the royal household, but he criticised the government's policy in Ireland, warning that it risked making the same mistakes as in America.

On 12 December 1781 Wrottesley voted against a motion from Sir James Lowther, 5th Baronet to end the war, declaring himself against the total withdrawal implied by the motion. However, on 22 Feb. 1782 Henry Seymour Conway, a veteran of both the War of the Austrian Succession and Seven Years' War made a motion against the war. Wrottesley voted for it but it was defeated by the smallest possible margin: 194 votes to 193. Five days later Conway moved a similar motion, again with Wrottesley's endorsement, which was approved by 234 to 215. On 15 March Wrottesley also voted for the motion of no confidence in North's administration made by Sir John Rous, which finally ended the government.

The end of North's government resulted in a government dominated by the Rockingham Whigs, who had consistently opposed the American Revolutionary War. However, the unexpected death of Rockingham in July left Lord Shelburne trying to hold together an unsteady coalition to bring the war to an end. Wrottesley voted for Shelburne's preliminary efforts for peace on 18 February 1783 – part of a rallying of independent members that allowed negotiations to proceed. Thereafter, Wrottesley abstained from voting on major measures proposed by the Fox-North Coalition that superseded Shelburne's ministry. He gave general support to William Pitt the Younger when he became Prime Minister at the end of 1783.

Wrottesley's military career progressed just as well while he was in the House of Commons as when he was on active duty. He was promoted to colonel in 1779 and major-general in 1782, and was appointed colonel of the 45th Foot in 1784. He died in 1787, at age 42.

== Family ==
Sir John succeeded to the baronetcy on his father's death on 20 July 1769. He married the Hon. Frances Courtenay, daughter of The Viscount Courtenay, in 1770, and they had ten children, including his heir, John, who succeeded him as 9th Baronet and was later ennobled as Baron Wrottesley.

== Notes ==
Parliament of Great Britain
Preceded by Thomas Gilbert; Sir Lawrence Dundas	Member of Parliament for Newcastle-under-Lyme; 1768; With: Alexander Forrester	Succeeded by Alexander Forrester; George Hay
Preceded by Sir William Bagot; Lord Grey	Member of Parliament for Staffordshire; 1768–1787; With: Sir William Bagot 1768–1780; Viscount Lewisham 1780–1784; Sir Edward Littleton 1784–1787	Succeeded by Sir Edward Littleton; Earl Gower
Baronetage of England
Preceded by Richard Wrottesley	Baronet (of Wrottesley); 1769–1787	Succeeded by John Wrottesley
