= Ralph Sneyd (MP for Stafford) =

English politician

Ralph Sneyd (1564 – 7 April 1643) was an English landowner and politician who sat in the House of Commons from 1640 to 1642. He was a colonel in the Royalist army in the English Civil War and was killed in action on the Isle of Man.

Sneyd was the son of Ralph Sneyd of Keele Hall and Bradwell and his first wife, Mary Chetwynd, daughter of Thomas Chetwynd, of Ingestrie. Sneyd inherited the estates of Keele and Bradwell. He was High Sheriff of Staffordshire in 1621.

In April 1640, Sneyd was elected Member of Parliament for Stafford in the Short Parliament. He was re-elected MP for Stafford in November 1640 for the Long Parliament and sat until he was disabled in 1642. Sneyd was a colonel in the King's army. Keele Hall was badly damaged in the Civil War and Sneyd suffered losses of up to £20,000 because of his loyalty to the king. He was killed by the last shot fired in defence of the Countess of Derby on the Isle of Man.

Sneyd married Felicia Archbold, daughter of Nicholas Archbold and Suzanna Borrough. His son, Ralph Sneyd, married Jane Downes, daughter of Roger Downes of Wardley Hall, Worsley.

Parliament of England
Vacant Parliament suspended since 1629	Member of Parliament for Stafford; 1640–1642; With: Richard Weston	Succeeded by John Swinfen; Sir Edward Leigh
