= Richard Wrottesley, 5th Baron Wrottesley =

British peer and army officer (1918–1977)

Major The Right Honourable The Lord Wrottesley MC
- Tenure: 1963–1977
- Predecessor: Victor Alexander Wrottesley, 4th Baron Wrottesley
- Successor: Clifton Wrottesley, 6th Baron Wrottesley
- Other names: Dick Wrottesley
- Born: Richard John Wrottesley; 7 July 1918; Chapel-en-le-Frith, Derbyshire, England
- Died: 23 October 1977 (aged 59); Westminster, London, England
- Education: Harrow School
- Spouse(s): Roshnara Wingfield-Stratford (m. 1941; div. 1949) Marion Rainey (m. 1949; div. 1953) Mary Ada Van Echten Tudhope (m. 1955)
- Parents: Hon. Walter Bennet Wrottesley (father); Kate May Harris (mother)
- Military career
- Allegiance: United Kingdom
- Branch: British Army
- Rank: Captain
- Unit: Guards Armoured Division
- Conflicts: World War II; Operation Market Garden

Major Richard John Wrottesley, 5th Baron Wrottesley MC (7 July 1918 – 23 October 1977), was a British peer and army officer.

== Early life and education ==
Wrottesley was the only son of Hon. Walter Bennet Wrottesley, fourth son of Arthur Wrottesley, 3rd Baron Wrottesley, and his wife Kate May Harris, only daughter of Douglas Howard Harris, of Craddock, Cape Colony, South Africa. He was educated at Harrow School.

He married Roshnara Barbara Wingfield-Stratford, only daughter of Captain Esmé Cecil Wingfield-Stratford DSC, of The Oaks, Berkhamsted, Hertfordshire, in 1941. They divorced in 1949.

== World War II service ==
He served with distinction in the Second World War. As a captain with the Guards Armoured Division, he is mentioned in A Bridge Too Far, the story of the battle for Arnhem. Another account of an incident near the Dutch town of Driel, during Operation Market Garden, reads:

"Whilst he [Major General Stanislaw Sosabowski] was in the western sector of Driel he heard the sound of armoured cars approaching and naturally assumed them to be German. However using his binoculars he soon identified them as being British, and so immediately ordered that the anti-tank mines be removed from the road. The four scout vehicles, commanded by Captain Wrottesley of No.5 Troop, C Squadron, the 2nd Household Cavalry, had been able to break through the German defences north of Nijmegen under the cover of fog, and they encountered the Polish bicycle patrol soon a few hours before arriving at Driel."

For leading his troop of armoured cars through the German lines, and establishing contact with the Polish Parachute Brigade on the south bank of the River Rhine, Wrottesley received the Military Cross. Some years later Wrottesley met the officer commanding the German tanks to whom he had given the slip. The German informed Wrottesley's then-wife, Mary, that: "I went to Berlin to get a blast from Hitler, and Dick went to get a medal from the King." He retired from the Army in 1950.

== Post-war life ==
Wrottesley married Joyce Marion Rainey, daughter of Frederick Alexander Wallace and former wife of Sean Rainey, in 1949. In her obituary, published in the Daily Telegraph in 2006, it was reported that:

In 1949 Marion met an Old Harrovian, Dick Wrottesley, in the Bag of Nails [sic] nightclub. The heir to Lord Wrottesley reputedly locked her in the lavatory until she had agreed to marry him.
In spite of blissful summers at Wrottesley, near Wolverhampton, where the family had lived for 900 years, and the birth of their son Mark, the marriage broke down quickly. Dick Wrottesley had already told his wife: "I only married you for your tarty qualities."

They were divorced in 1953.

He married Mary Ada Van Echten Tudhope, of Rondebosch, Cape Town, South Africa, only daughter of Edgar Dryden Tudhope, in 1955. He succeeded to the baronetcy and barony on the death of his uncle in 1963. The Wrottesley family estate, Wrottesley Hall, was broken up when the 5th Baron sold it in 1963 and moved to South Africa.

He died in October 1977, aged 59, and was succeeded in the baronetcy and barony by his grandson Clifton Wrottesley, 6th Baron Wrottesley.

== See also ==
- Baron Wrottesley, and The Wrottesley Baronetcy
- Wrottesley Hall, Staffordshire

Peerage of the United Kingdom
Preceded by Victor Alexander Wrottesley	Baron Wrottesley; 1963–1977	Succeeded by Clifton Hugh Lancelot de Verdon Wrottesley
