= Baron Wrottesley =

Barony in the Peerage of the United Kingdom

Baron Wrottesley, of Wrottesley in the County of Stafford, is a title in the Peerage of the United Kingdom. It was created on 11 July 1838 for Sir John Wrottesley, 9th Baronet. He was a Major-General in the Army and also represented Lichfield, Staffordshire and Staffordshire South in House of Commons. The Wrottesley family's original patronymic was 'de Verdun' (otherwise 'de Verdon'), which meant that the creation of the title Baron Wrottesley represented the third barony created by a branch of the de Verdun family in England. The other two were established by Theobald de Verdun, 1st Baron Verdun of Alton Castle and Sir John de Verdon, 1st Baron Verdon, lord of Brixworth in Northamptonshire and Bressingham in Norfolk.

He was succeeded by his son, the second Baron. He was President of the Royal Astronomical Society as well as of the Royal Society. His son, the third Baron, held junior positions in the first two Liberal administrations of William Ewart Gladstone. He was succeeded by his eldest son, the fourth Baron. On his death in 1962 the titles passed to his nephew, the fifth Baron who was the only son of the Hon. Walter Bennet Wrottesley, youngest son of the third Baron. In 1941 he married into the Noble House of Stratford, from which all subsequent Barons Wrottesley descend, and in 1963 he sold the Staffordshire estate. As of 2010 the titles are held by the fifth Baron's grandson, the sixth Baron, who succeeded in 1977. He is the only son of the Hon. Richard Francis Gerard Wrottesley, second son of the fifth Baron.

The Wrottesley Baronetcy, of Wrottesley in the County of Stafford, was created in the Baronetage of England on 30 August 1642 for Walter Wrottesley. He fought on the Royalist side in the Civil War. His great-grandson, the fourth Baronet, briefly represented Staffordshire in the House of Commons. His younger son, the seventh Baronet (who had succeeded his elder brother, who in his turn had succeeded his elder brother), sat as a Member of Parliament for Tavistock but later took Holy Orders and served as Dean of Worcester. His son, the eighth Baronet, represented Newcastle-under-Lyme and Staffordshire in Parliament. He was succeeded by his son, the ninth Baronet, who was raised to the peerage in 1838.

The family seat was Wrottesley Hall near Wolverhampton, Staffordshire. Several of the Baronets served as High Sheriff of Staffordshire.

== Wrottesley Baronets, of Wrottesley (1642) ==
- Sir Walter Wrottesley, 1st Baronet (1606–1659)
- Sir Walter Wrottesley, 2nd Baronet (c. 1632–c. 1686)
- Sir Walter Wrottesley, 3rd Baronet (c. 1659–1712)
- Sir John Wrottesley, 4th Baronet (c. 1682–1726)
- Sir Hugh Wrottesley, 5th Baronet (d. 1729)
- Sir Walter Wrottesley, 6th Baronet (d. 1731)
- Sir Richard Wrottesley, 7th Baronet (1721–1769)
- Sir John Wrottesley, 8th Baronet (1744–1787)
- Sir John Wrottesley, 9th Baronet (1771–1841) (created Baron Wrottesley in 1838)

== Barons Wrottesley (1838) ==
Escutcheon of the Barons Wrottesley

- John Wrottesley, 1st Baron Wrottesley (1771–1841)
- John Wrottesley, 2nd Baron Wrottesley (1798–1867)
- Arthur Wrottesley, 3rd Baron Wrottesley (1824–1910)
- Victor Alexander Wrottesley, 4th Baron Wrottesley (1873–1962)
- Richard John Wrottesley, 5th Baron Wrottesley (1918–1977)
- Clifton Hugh Lancelot de Verdon Wrottesley, 6th Baron Wrottesley (b. 1968)

The heir apparent is the present holder's eldest son the Hon. Victor Ernest Francis de Verdon Wrottesley (b. 2004)

== See also ==
Walter Wrottesley (d. 1473)
