= George Wrottesley =

English Army officer, biographer, and antiquary

George Wrottesley (15 June 1827 – 4 March 1909) was a British Army officer, also known as a biographer and antiquary.

== Early life ==
Born at 5 Powys Place, London, on 15 June 1827, he was third son of John Wrottesley, 2nd Baron Wrottesley, by Sophia Elizabeth, third daughter of Thomas Giffard of Chillington. He was educated at Blackheath Proprietary School.

Entering the Royal Military Academy, Woolwich, in 1842, Wrottesley obtained a commission in the Royal Engineers in 1845. He was ordered almost immediately to Ireland for famine relief works, and in 1847 to Gibraltar, where he remained till 1849. In 1852 he joined the Ordnance Survey.

== Crimean War ==
Wrottesley took part in the Crimean War, sailing for the Dardanelles on survey work in January 1854. With Sir John Fox Burgoyne he went on the mission to Omar Pasha at Shumla. He afterwards became A.D.C. to General Richard Tylden, officer commanding Royal Engineers in Turkey, and in this capacity he accompanied Lord Raglan to Varna. He was engaged at Varna on plans and reports on the Turkish lines of retreat from the Danube River, when he was struck down by dysentery, which ultimately caused complete deafness. In October 1854 he was invalided home and promoted to captain.

== Later life ==
On Burgoyne's return from the Crimea to the war office in 1855 as inspector-general of fortifications, Wrottesley was appointed his A.D.C., and he stayed with the field marshal, acting as his secretary on commissions and confidential adviser till Burgoyne's retirement in 1868. Wrottesley accompanied Burgoyne to Paris in 1855, when he presented to Napoleon III the funeral car of Napoleon I from St. Helena.

Wrottesley was secretary of the defense committee of the war office, 1856–60; of the committee on the influence of rifled artillery on works of defense, 1859; and of the committee on the storage of powder in magazines, 1865. In 1863, then a major, he presided over the committee on army signaling which introduced the use of the Morse system. He was made lieutenant-colonel in 1868, and on Burgoyne's retirement took over the command of the engineers at Shorncliffe. In 1872 he commanded at Greenwich, and in 1875 became officer commanding R.E. at Woolwich, retiring from the army in 1881 with the rank of major-general.

Wrottesley died on 4 March 1909, and was buried in the Wrottesley vault in Tettenhall church.

== Works ==
Wrottesley collected and edited The Military Opinions of Gen. Sir J. F. Burgoyne in 1859; and published Life and Correspondence of Field Marshal Sir J. F. Burgoyne (2 vols.) in 1873. But his main interest lay in genealogy. In 1879 he founded with Robert William Eyton the William Salt Society, of which he was secretary from 1879 till his death. His genealogical work is embodied in the 34 volumes of the Staffordshire Collections of the society. His major contributions were those on the Liber Niger (1880), his Pleas of the Forest (1884), the Military Service of Knights in the 13th and 14th centuries, Crecy and Calais (1897). The last, together with Pedigrees from the Plea Rolls, The Giffards from the Conquest (1902), The Wrottesleys of Wrottesley (1903), The Okeovers of Okeover (1904), and The Bagots of Bagots Bromley (1908), were republished separately.

== Family ==
Wrottesley married (1) on 7 January 1854 Margaret Anne, daughter of Sir John Fox Burgoyne; she died on 3 May 1883; and (2) on 21 February 1889 Nina Margaret, daughter of John William Philips of Heybridge, Staffordshire, who survived him. He had no issue by either marriage.
