= Keele =

Village in Staffordshire, England

Coordinates: 53.0044°N 2.2871°W

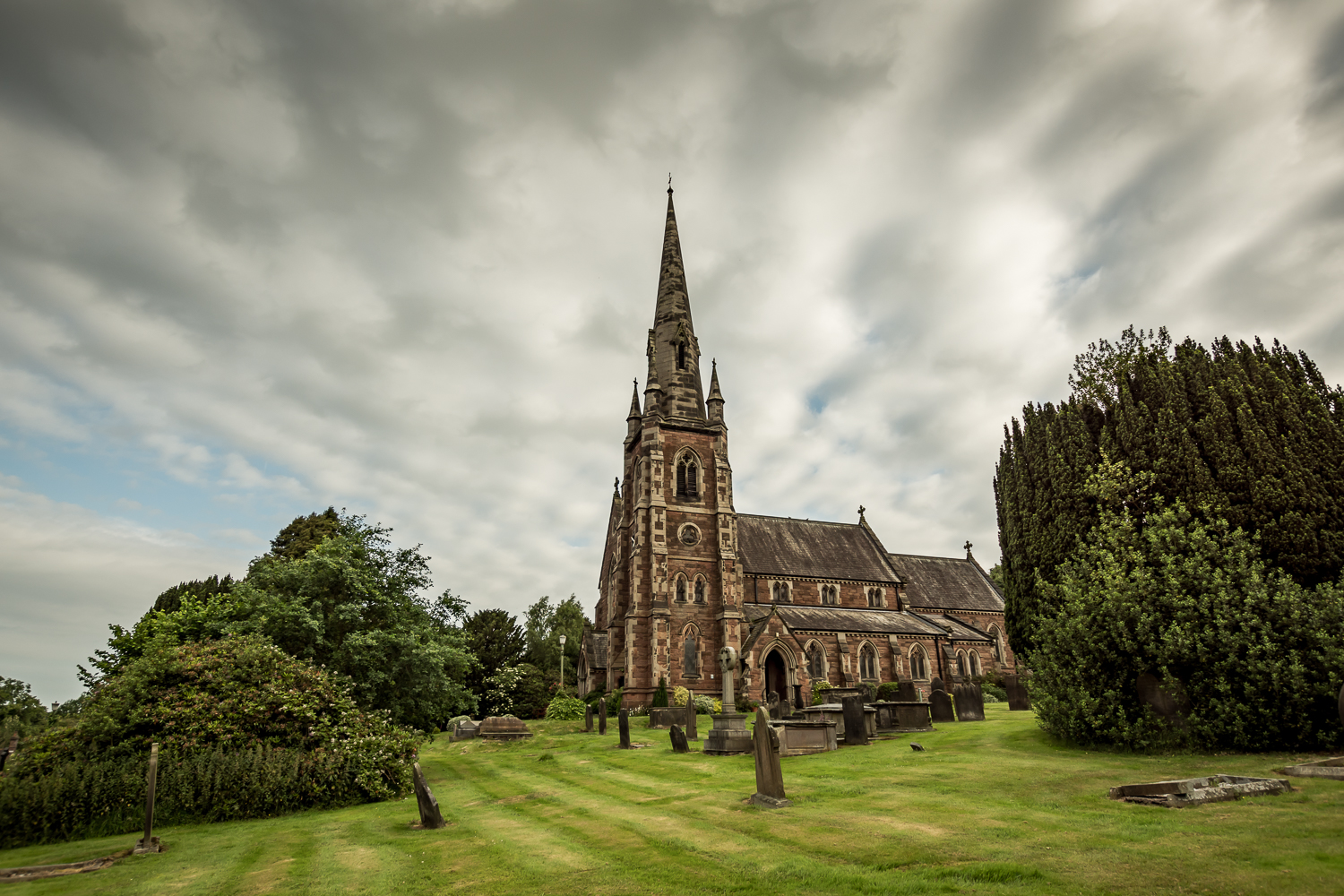
- St John the Baptist Church

- Location within Staffordshire
- Population: 4,129 (2011 Census)
- OS grid reference: SJ807453
- Civil parish: Keele
- District: Newcastle-under-Lyme
- Shire county: Staffordshire
- Region: West Midlands
- Country: England
- Sovereign state: United Kingdom
- Post town: NEWCASTLE
- Postcode district: ST5
- Dialling code: 01782
- Police: Staffordshire
- Fire: Staffordshire
- Ambulance: West Midlands
- UK Parliament: Newcastle-under-Lyme

Keele is a village and civil parish in the Borough of Newcastle-under-Lyme, Staffordshire, England. It is approximately 3 miles (4.8 km) west of Newcastle-under-Lyme and is close to the village of Silverdale. It is best known as the location of Keele University.

The village is located in the Keele ward of the borough, with its name drawing from the old Anglo-Saxon Cȳ-hyll, meaning "Cow-hill". The 2001 census gave the parish a population of 3,664, increasing to 4,129 at the 2011 census. Most of the population were university students at one of its halls of residence, Hawthorns, which has since been sold for land redevelopment; it was located in the heart of the village.

== History ==
=== The Knights Templars and Knights Hospitallers ===
The village is recognised for its association with the university and its position astride the M6 motorway; however, during the Middle Ages, Keele was a major route from the North-West to London for laden packhorses and caravans alike. Keele Preceptory was granted to the Knights Templar, sometime between 1168 and 1169, by King Henry II. The Knights Templars, military order and later rivals Knights Hospitallers, would charge incoming traffic to pass through their lands; this would supplement rental income from farming tenants.

Little remains today of the Templar's heritage and less so of the Hospitallers. An iron sculpture celebrating the arrival of the Templars at Keele was erected during the construction of the 1992 by-pass between Newcastle-under Lyme and Madeley. Additionally, one university hall of residence, Holly Cross, located on the estate and shaped in a Templar Cross, commemorates their presence. The parish church is named after the patron saint of the Hospitallers, St John the Baptist; it is believed that one of the church's stained glass panels still contain elements of surviving early medieval glass.

=== Keele Estate and the Sneyd family ===
From the mid-15th century until the 1940s, the Sneyd family owned much of the village; this included cottages, school, farm and an inn, dominating local life architecturally, as well as socially and receiving rents from villagers and tenants. The inhabitants were principally employed in collieries and iron works, notably in Silverdale, also belonging to the Sneyds.

During the Second World War, the estate was requisitioned by the British government for the British Army. Various training activities were carried out until the arrival of American servicemen in 1944. They occupied over 100 temporary buildings and Nissen Huts. General Patton visited during this period. Some prisoners of war were held locally; after the war, it became a camp for Polish servicemen and displaced persons.

== University ==
In 1948, with accumulated gambling debts amassed by the late Ralph Sneyd and high tax duties, the estate (including village outlets) was sold off by remaining relatives to Stoke-on-Trent Corporation. The land was earmarked for the development of the new University College of North Staffordshire, which was founded in 1949, opened in 1950 and received its royal charter as Keele University in 1962.

In the village, a collection of buildings, collectively known as the Hawthorns, named after a 19th-century medieval farmhouse were erected and became home to students. The first students took up residence in Hawthorns House in 1957 and the expanded residential complex was discontinued in 2017. The Sneyd Arms public house remains popular with the student community.

Keele University is featured on the UK's Here and Now edition of the board game Monopoly, released in September 2007, It takes the place of Fleet Street in the traditional version.

== Transport ==
Keele is served by three bus services, operated by D&G Bus and First Potteries. These connect the village with Newcastle-Under-Lyme, Nantwich, Crewe, Stone and Stoke-on-Trent.

Keele lies on the A53 road between Newcastle, Market Drayton and Shrewsbury. The M6 motorway passes to the south and west of the village; Keele Services, a motorway service station, lies nearby.

The village was also served by Keele railway station, which was a stop on the former Stoke-Market Drayton Line from 1870 to 1956. The line remained in use for freight traffic until 1998, when the line to Silverdale Colliery was closed. The tracks between Silverdale and Pipe Gate remain in place, but are overgrown and out of use.

== Climate ==
Climate data for Keele (1991–2020 normals), extremes 1959–present
Month	Jan	Feb	Mar	Apr	May	Jun	Jul	Aug	Sep	Oct	Nov	Dec	Year
Record high °C (°F)	13.3 (55.9)	17.0 (62.6)	20.6 (69.1)	23.7 (74.7)	25.9 (78.6)	30.0 (86.0)	36.1 (97.0)	32.9 (91.2)	28.0 (82.4)	25.7 (78.3)	17.3 (63.1)	14.4 (57.9)	36.1 (97.0)
Mean daily maximum °C (°F)	6.5 (43.7)	7.1 (44.8)	9.5 (49.1)	12.4 (54.3)	15.5 (59.9)	18.1 (64.6)	20.2 (68.4)	19.8 (67.6)	17.2 (63.0)	13.3 (55.9)	9.4 (48.9)	6.8 (44.2)	13.0 (55.4)
Daily mean °C (°F)	3.9 (39.0)	4.3 (39.7)	6.1 (43.0)	8.4 (47.1)	11.3 (52.3)	14.0 (57.2)	16.0 (60.8)	15.8 (60.4)	13.5 (56.3)	10.2 (50.4)	6.7 (44.1)	4.2 (39.6)	9.6 (49.3)
Mean daily minimum °C (°F)	1.4 (34.5)	1.4 (34.5)	2.7 (36.9)	4.5 (40.1)	7.1 (44.8)	9.9 (49.8)	11.8 (53.2)	11.7 (53.1)	9.8 (49.6)	7.1 (44.8)	3.9 (39.0)	1.7 (35.1)	6.1 (43.0)
Record low °C (°F)	−13.3 (8.1)	−10.0 (14.0)	−9.4 (15.1)	−4.7 (23.5)	−2.8 (27.0)	1.4 (34.5)	5.0 (41.0)	4.6 (40.3)	1.1 (34.0)	−2.5 (27.5)	−8.4 (16.9)	−12.5 (9.5)	−13.3 (8.1)
Average precipitation mm (inches)	67.7 (2.67)	56.8 (2.24)	53.7 (2.11)	53.8 (2.12)	63.2 (2.49)	70.6 (2.78)	69.6 (2.74)	79.0 (3.11)	72.1 (2.84)	82.7 (3.26)	76.7 (3.02)	82.1 (3.23)	827.9 (32.59)
Average precipitation days (≥ 1.0 mm)	13.6	11.9	11.7	11.1	10.6	11.0	11.9	12.5	11.4	13.3	14.3	14.9	148.0
Mean monthly sunshine hours	53.6	75.1	113.1	155.1	190.5	170.0	182.8	168.1	129.4	100.2	59.2	50.8	1,447.9
Source 1: Met Office
Source 2: Starlings Roost Weather

== Notable people ==
- Walter Sneyd (1752–1829) of Keele Hall, MP for Castle Rising in 1784–1790
- Grand Duke Michael Mikhailovich of Russia (1861–1929) lived in Keele Hall between 1900 and 1909.
- Major General William Donovan Stamer CB, CBE, DSO, MC (1895 in Keele–1963), a British Army officer in the North Staffordshire Regiment.

== Gallery ==
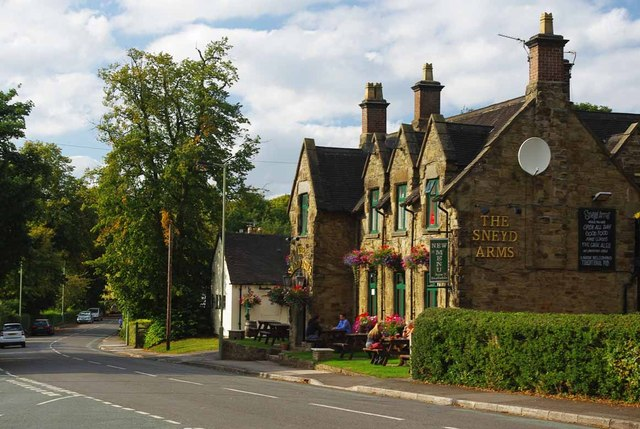
The Sneyd Arms

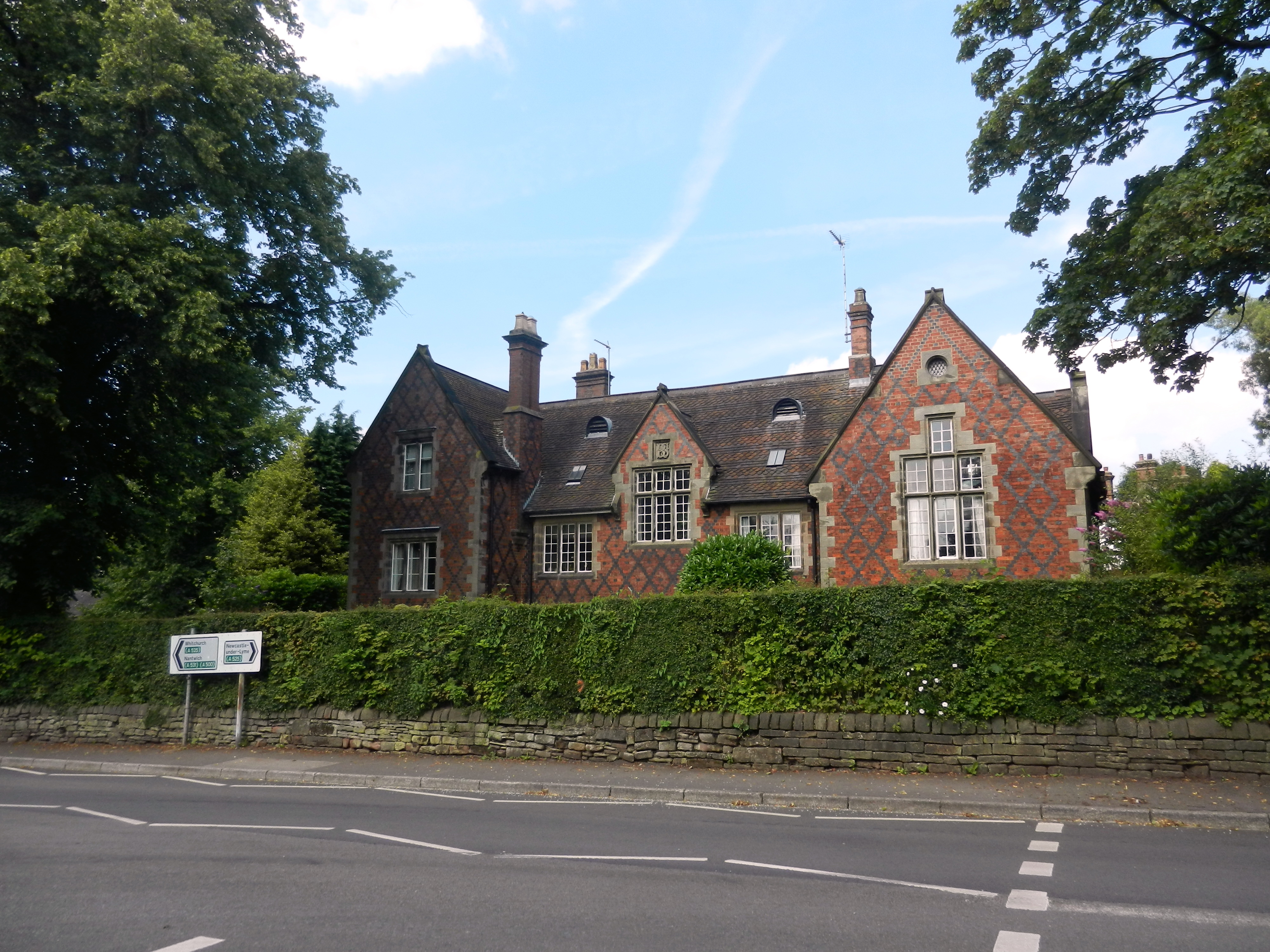
Keele Old School

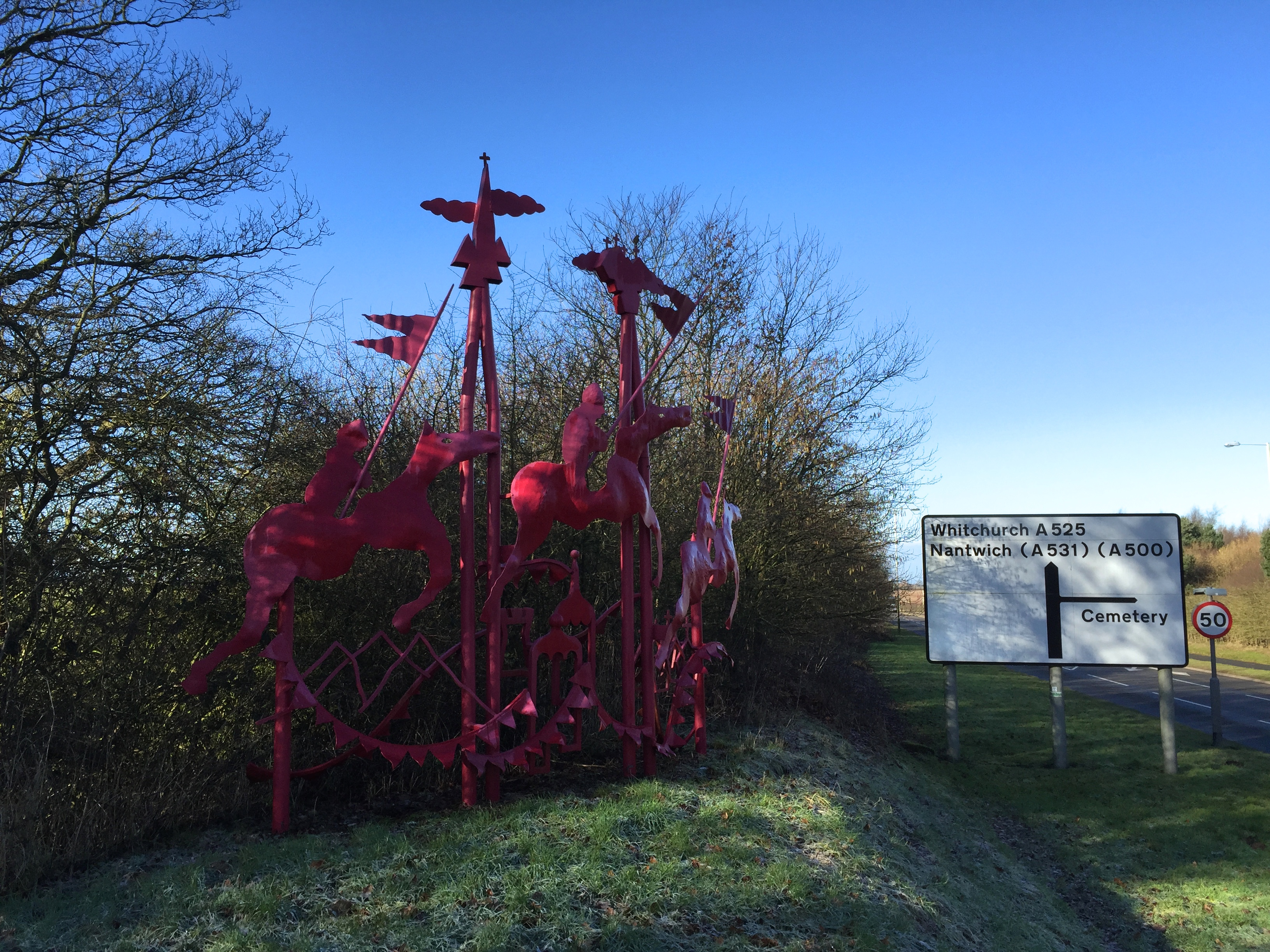
Knights Templar sculpture

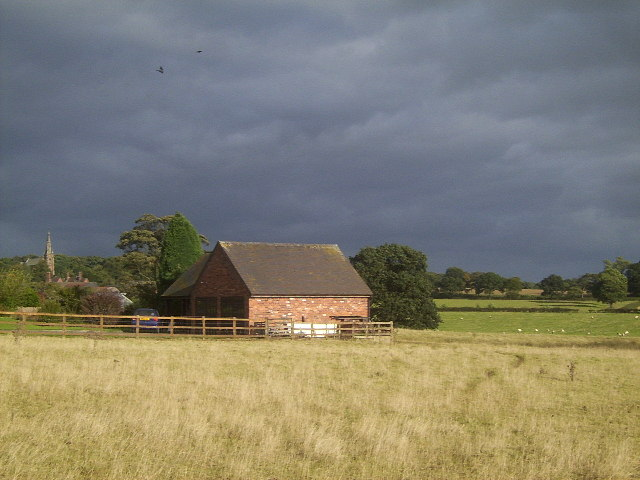
Keele suburbia

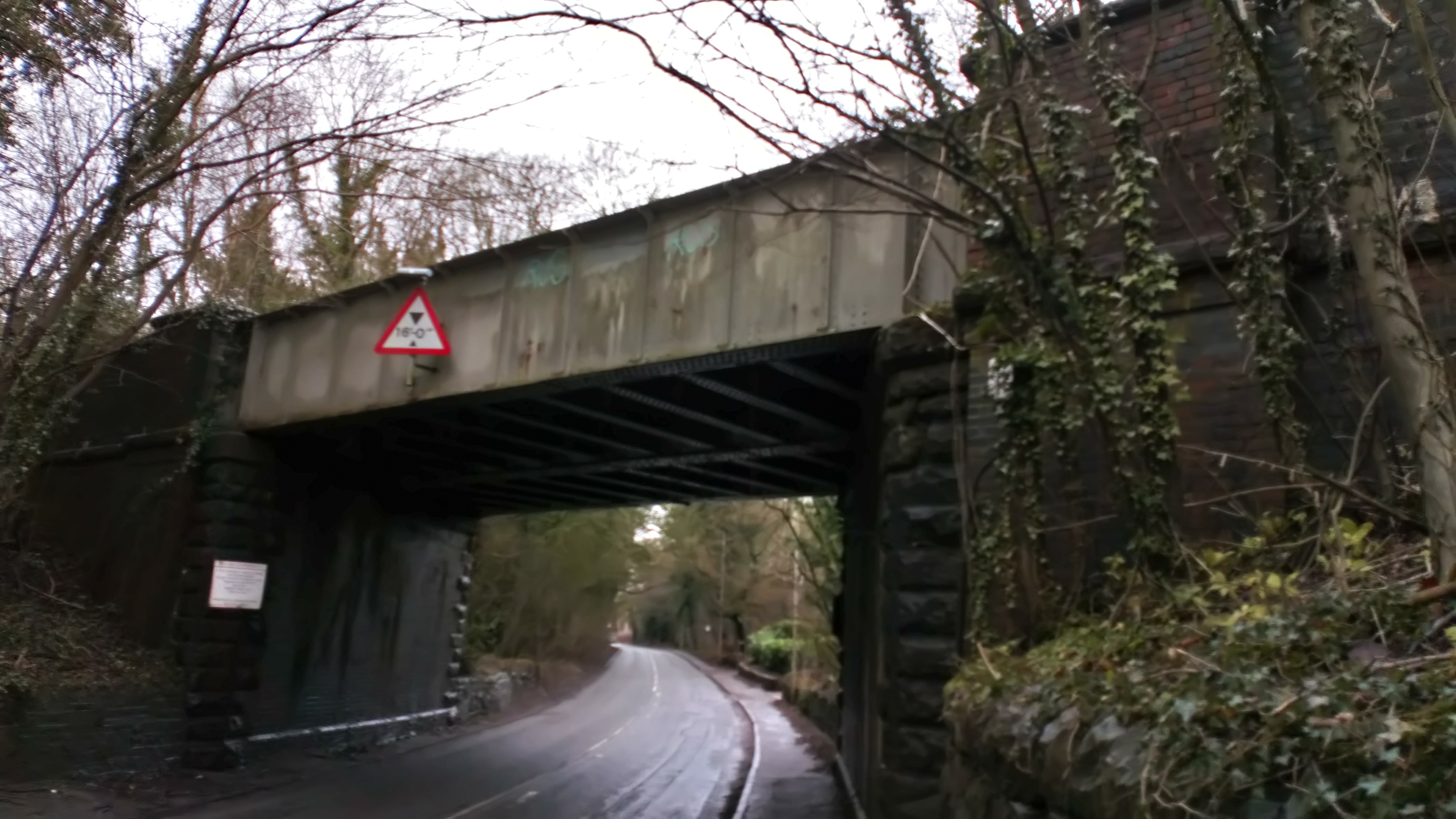
Former railway bridge

== See also ==
- Listed buildings in Keele
