= John Wrottesley, 2nd Baron Wrottesley =

English astronomer (1798-1867)

The Right Honourable The Lord Wrottesley FRS FRAS
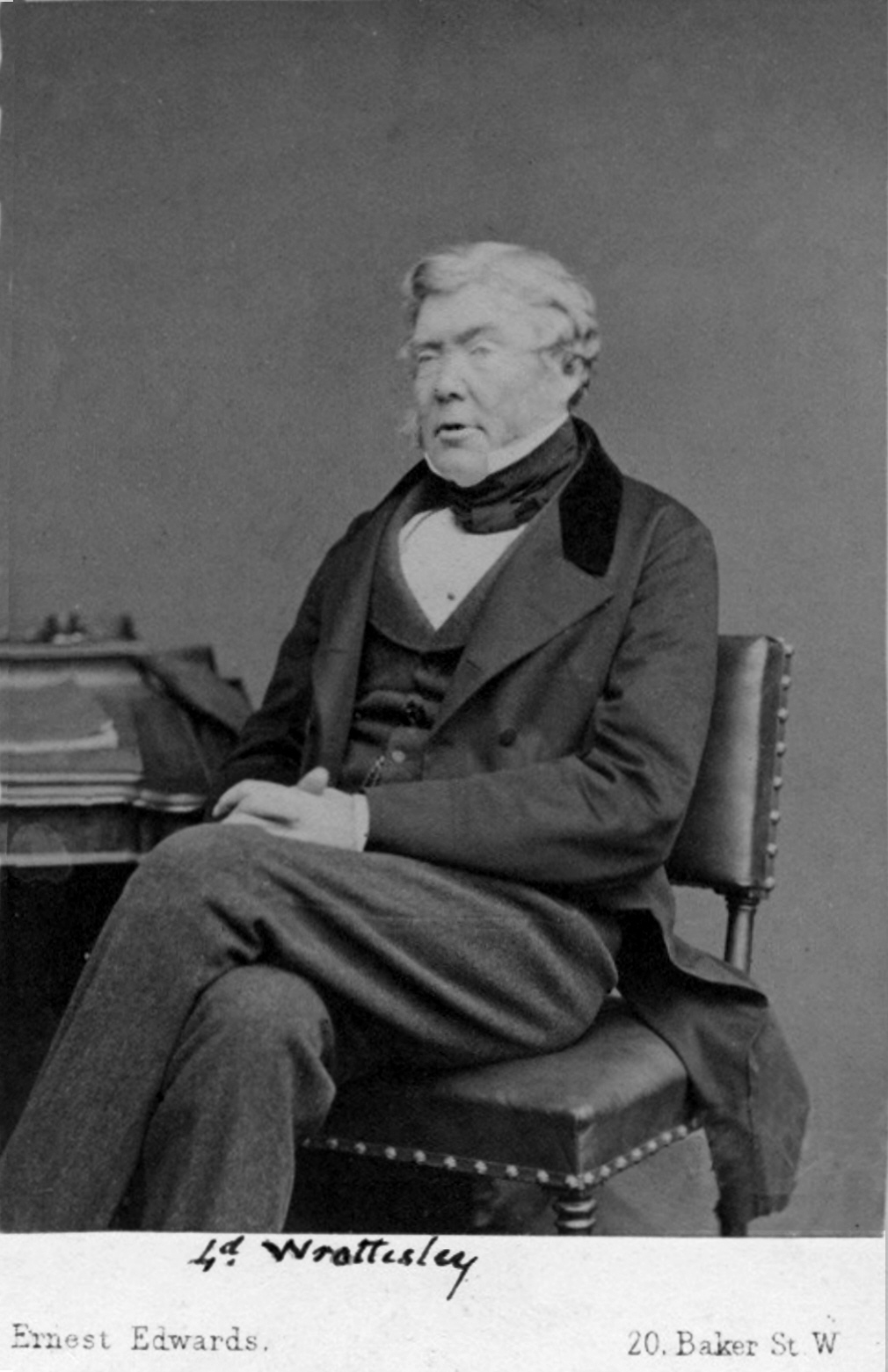
- Born: 5 August 1798 near Wolverhampton
- Died: 27 October 1867 (aged 69)
- Education: Christ Church, Oxford
- Spouse: Sophia Elizabeth Giffard (m. 1821)
- Children: 7
- Parents: John Wrottesley (father); Lady Caroline Bennet (mother)
- Relatives: Charles Bennet, 4th Earl of Tankerville (maternal grandfather); Emma Colebrook (maternal grandmother); Arthur Wrottesley, 3rd Baron Wrottesley (son); George Wrottesley (son)
- Scientific career
- Awards: Gold Medal of the Royal Astronomical Society (1839)
- Fields: astronomy

28th President of the Royal Society
- In office 1854–1858
- Preceded by: William Parsons
- Succeeded by: Benjamin Collins Brodie

John Wrottesley, 2nd Baron Wrottesley, FRS, FRAS (5 August 1798 – 27 October 1867) was an English astronomer.

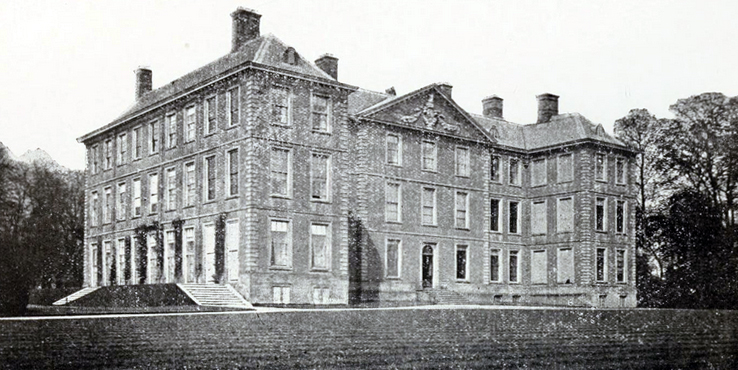
Wrottesley Hall, family mansion

== Life ==
Wrottesley was the son of John Wrottesley, 1st Baron Wrottesley, and his first wife Lady Caroline Bennet, daughter of Charles Bennet, 4th Earl of Tankerville. He attended Christ Church, Oxford, where he graduated with a First Class degree in Mathematics in 1819. He succeeded his father as baron on 16 March 1841.

Wrottesley is distinguished for his attainments in astronomical science, was a founding member of the Royal Astronomical Society and served as its president from 1841 to 1842. In 1839 he received the Gold Medal of the Royal Astronomical Society for his Catalogue of the Right Ascensions of 1,318 Stars. In 1853 he called the attention of the House of Lords to Lieutenant Maury's valuable scheme of meteorological observations and discoveries, and on 30 November 1855 succeeded the Earl of Rosse as President of the Royal Society. Wrottesley was President of the British Association for the Advancement of Science in 1860, the year of the famous debate between Wilberforce and Huxley at the Association's Oxford meeting.

The crater Wrottesley on the Moon is named in honour of John Wrottesley.

Lord Wrottesley died in October 1867, aged 69.

== Family ==
On 28 July 1821 Wrottesley married Sophia Elizabeth (d. 13 January 1880), third daughter of Thomas Giffard of Chillington in Staffordshire. By her he had five sons and two daughters. His two youngest sons—Henry and Cameron—were killed in warfare. He was succeeded in the baronetcy and barony by his eldest son Arthur Wrottesley. George Wrottesley was his third son.

== See also ==
- List of presidents of the Royal Society

Peerage of the United Kingdom
Preceded by John Wrottesley	Baron Wrottesley; 1841–1867	Succeeded by Arthur Wrottesley
Professional and academic associations
Preceded by William Parsons	28th President of the Royal Society; 1854–1858	Succeeded by Benjamin Collins Brodie
