= Wrottesley Hall =

Country house in Staffordshire, England

Coordinates: 52.6127°N 2.2232°W

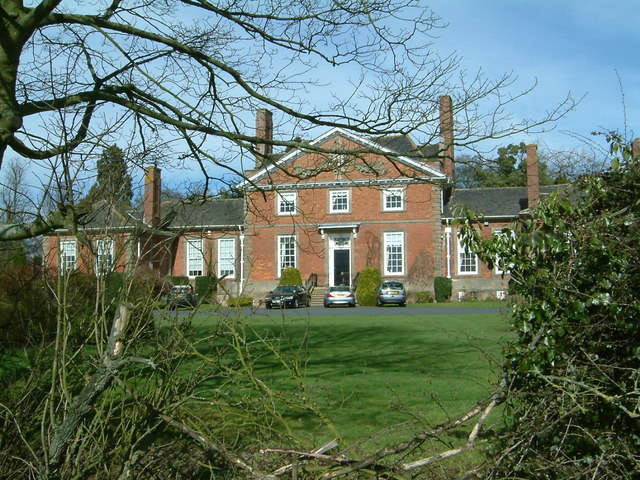
Wrottesley Hall, Staffordshire

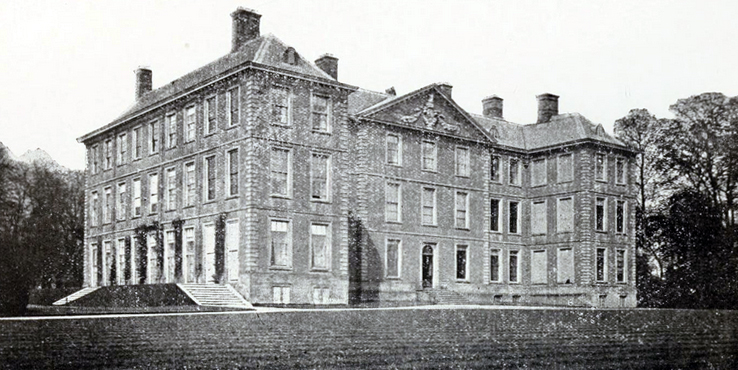
Wrottesley Hall before the 1897 fire

Wrottesley Hall is a 1923-built Grade II listed house in the civil parish of Perton, and historically part of Tettenhall in Staffordshire, England.

The manor of Wrottesley had been held by the Wrottesley family (originally 'de Verdun') from the twelfth century, having been granted to Simon de Verdun of Cocton (Coughton, Warwickshire), son of William (de Verdun) of Cocton by Adam the Abbot of Evesham. The deed granting Wrottesley and Loynton in Staffordshire to Simon was witnessed by some of his kinsmen: Bertram de Verdun (III) of Alton Castle, Guy de Verdun and Roeland de Verdun. The deed is dated sometime between 1160 when Adam became Abbot and 1167 when Simon appears in the Pipe Roll for Staffordshire as lord of Wrottesley

A moated Tudor house which stood on the site was demolished in 1686 and replaced by Sir Walter Wrottesley, 3rd Baronet to designs by Christopher Wren, as a four-storeyed 'H' plan mansion, comprising a pedimented central entrance block of three bays and flanking wings of four bays each, standing in a 2,000-acre (8.1 km^{2}) park.

The house was destroyed by fire in 1897 and was replaced with the present structure of more modest proportions in 1923, comprising a two-storey pedimented three bay central block and single storey four bay wings. The pediment carries the Wrottesley family arms. Exterior steps and ancillary buildings of the original pre-1897 hall are Grade II listed.

During the Second World War the park was the base of the Free Dutch forces. The estate was broken up when the 5th Baron sold up in 1963 and moved to South Africa. The house was then purchased by the Hartill family in the 1960s, who developed the adjacent Grade II listed coach house into residential units. The Wrottesley Golf Course was founded in the 1970s, and still operates today.

== See also ==
- Listed buildings in Perton
