= John Wrottesley, 1st Baron Wrottesley =

British politician

John Wrottesley, 1st Baron Wrottesley (4 October 1771 – 16 March 1841), known as Sir John Wrottesley, 9th Baronet, from 1787 to 1838, was a British Army officer and Member of Parliament.

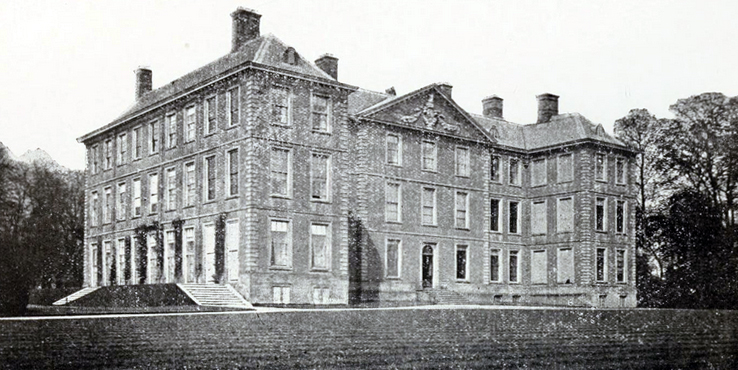
Wrottesley Hall

Wrottesley was the son of Sir John Wrottesley, 8th Baronet. He reached the rank of major-general. He was also appointed as Lieutenant-Colonel Commandant of the Western Regiment of Staffordshire Local Militia in 1809.

Wrottesley was also a Member of Parliament for Lichfield from 1799 to 1806, for Staffordshire from 1823 to 1832, and for Staffordshire South from 1832 to 1837. On 11 July 1838, he was ennobled as Baron Wrottesley, of Wrottesley in the County of Stafford.

Lord Wrottesley married firstly Lady Caroline Bennet, daughter of Charles Bennet, 4th Earl of Tankerville, in 1795. After his first wife's death in 1818, he married secondly Julia Conyers, daughter of John Conyers of Copped Hall, Essex, in 1819. Julia was the widow of Captain John Astley Bennet RN, the brother of Wrottesley's first wife. There were no children from this marriage. Lord Wrottesley died in March 1841, aged 69, and was succeeded in the baronetcy and barony by his son John Wrottesley.

Parliament of Great Britain
Preceded by Thomas Anson; Lord Granville Leveson-Gower	Member of Parliament for Lichfield; 1797–1801; With: Thomas Anson	Succeeded by Parliament of the United Kingdom
Parliament of the United Kingdom
Preceded by Parliament of Great Britain	Member of Parliament for Lichfield; 1801–1806; With: Thomas Anson 1801–1806; Sir George Anson 1806	Succeeded by Sir George Anson; George Granville Venables Vernon
Preceded by Edward Littleton; Sir John Fenton Boughey, Bt	Member of Parliament for Staffordshire; 1823–1832; With: Edward Littleton	Constituency abolished
New constituency	Member of Parliament for South Staffordshire; 1832–1837; With: Edward Littleton 1832–1835; Sir Francis Holyoake-Goodricke, Bt	Succeeded by George Anson; Viscount Ingestre
Peerage of the United Kingdom
New creation	Baron Wrottesley; 1838–1841	Succeeded by John Wrottesley
Baronetage of the United Kingdom
Preceded by John Wrottesley	Baronet (of Wrottesley); 1787–1841	Succeeded by John Wrottesley
