= Wom Brook =

Stream in Staffordshire, England

Coordinates: 52.5326°N 2.1861°W

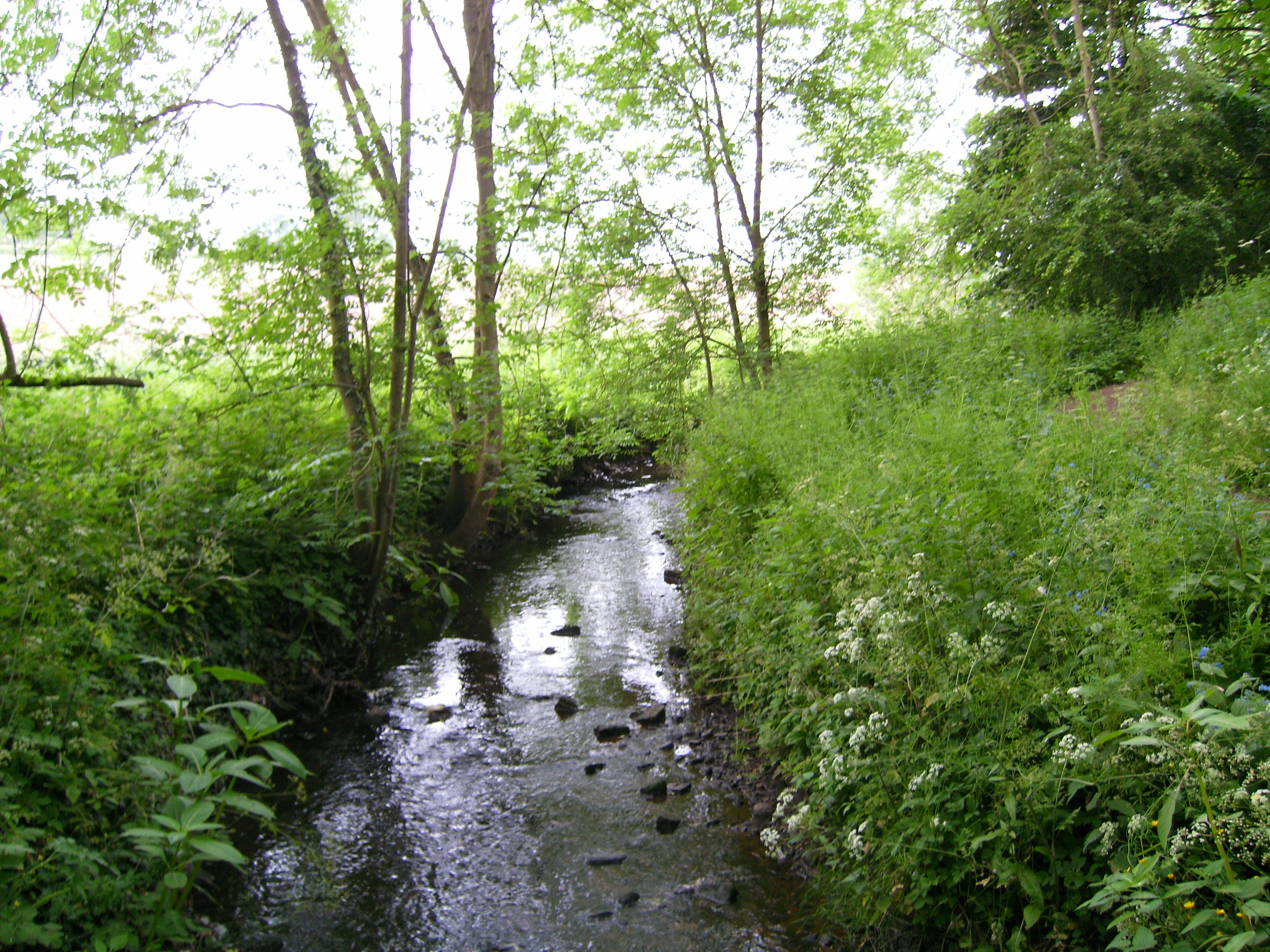
Wom Brook
Wom Brook at the Rookery footbridge, close to the eastern end of the walk.
Location
Village:	Wombourne
County:	Staffordshire
Country:	England, U.K.
Wom Brook Walk
Length:	1.5 miles (2.6 km)
Status:	Local nature reserve
Established:	2004
Awards:	Green Flag Award
Administration
Administrative authority:	South Staffordshire District Council
Groups:	Friends of Wom Brook

The Wom Brook is a stream in South Staffordshire, England. It flows through the large village of Wombourne, and has played an important part in its industrial history. It is an important tributary of the River Smestow and part of the Severn catchment.

== Etymology ==
The name of the stream is probably a back-formation from the name of the village of Wombourn or Wombourne. The word burna was used for a stream in the oldest strata of Old English toponyms. The village name was long thought to mean "Womb Stream", or stream in a hollow, because this is a reasonable description of the situation.

The stream itself is not named in Domesday and medieval documents relating to the village. However, to turn the first element in the village name into a designation for the stream was logical and the Wom Brook is so-named on Ordnance Survey maps, although not on earlier maps. The Old English term brōca, another word for a stream, is later than burna and its derivative, brook, continues in use as a common noun in the English Midlands, while burn has become confined to Scotland and Northern England. This makes it fairly certain the name Wom Brook is of considerably later origin than the village name. Occasionally it is found in elided form as Wombrook.

== Course ==
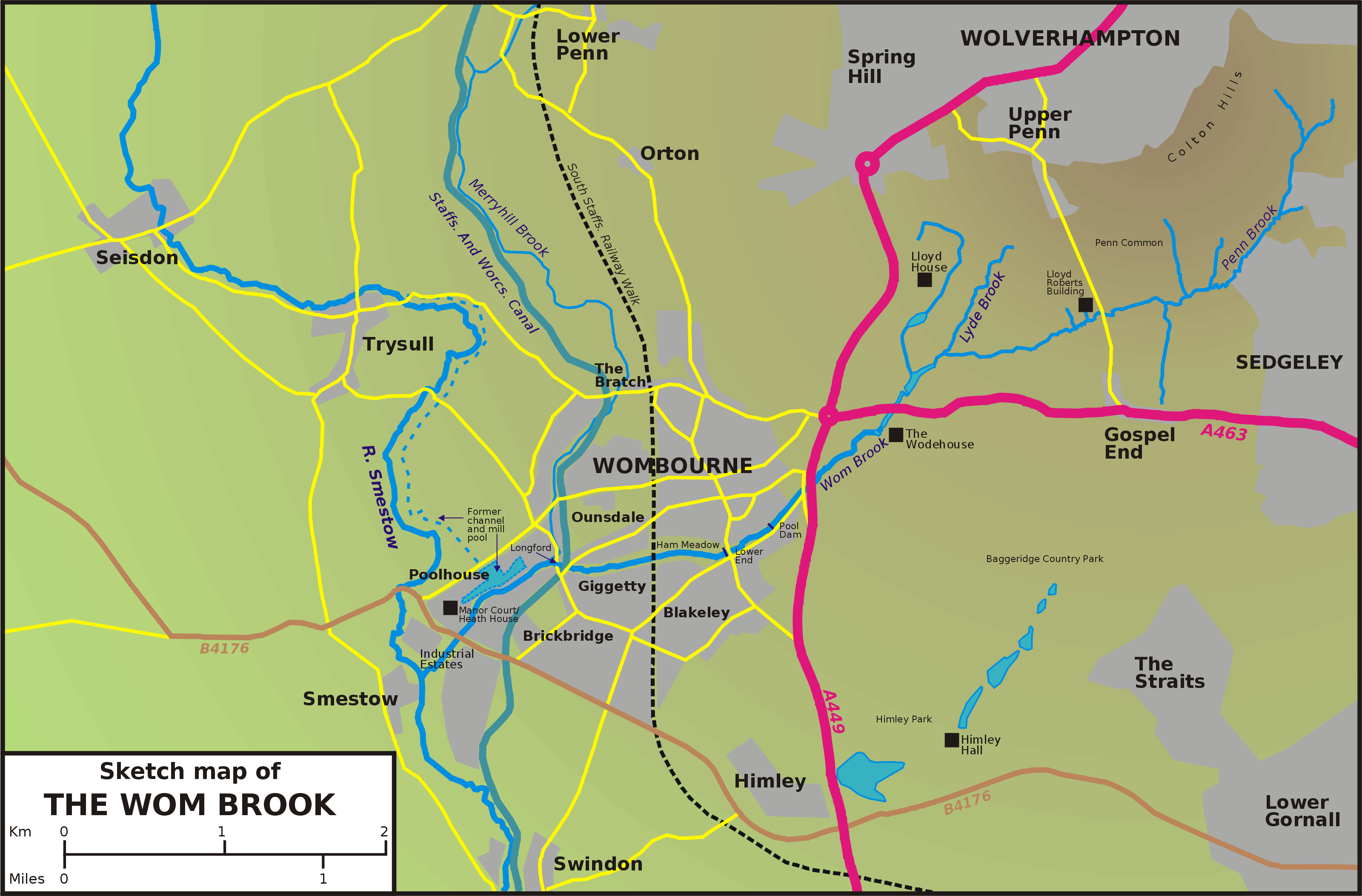
Sketch map of the Wom Brook and its tributaries.

The name Wom Brook is generally applied to a stream that emerges from the pools at the Wodehouse - the product of the confluence of the Penn Brook, the Lyden Brook and other streams that drain water from the Colton Hills on the southern fringe of Wolverhampton. Flowing south-west, it goes beneath both A449 and the older Stafford-Worcester road that runs alongside it, emerging at the edge of the village of Wombourne. At this point the Wom Brook Walk, a local nature reserve begins.

The stream is soon interrupted by the Pool Dam, the remains of a forge mill, where it tumbles steeply to the lower level. Passing just south of the village centre and behind the Civic Centre, it arrives at Lower End, the site of another former mill, where it passes under a road. The banks then open out into Ham Meadow, an area of grassland and trees. Flowing under the South Staffordshire Railway Walk and dropping again, the Wom enters the wooded Giggetty section, where it meanders through trees well below the level of the nearby housing.

Beyond Giggetty, the Wom disappears briefly into a culvert beneath a road and the Staffordshire and Worcestershire Canal. Walkers take a short detour to find the brook flowing out from the culvert across the road at Longford, still a hazard to motorists after heavy rain. Immediately after comes the confluence with the Merryhill Brook, which joins the Wom next to Tyre Hill, the remains of a disused quarry. The brook flows through the Poolhouse estate, on the site of the former Heath Mill complex. Disappearing under the Bridgnorth road, it then flows through an area of industrial estates, finally discharging into the River Smestow directly opposite the village of Smestow.

== History ==
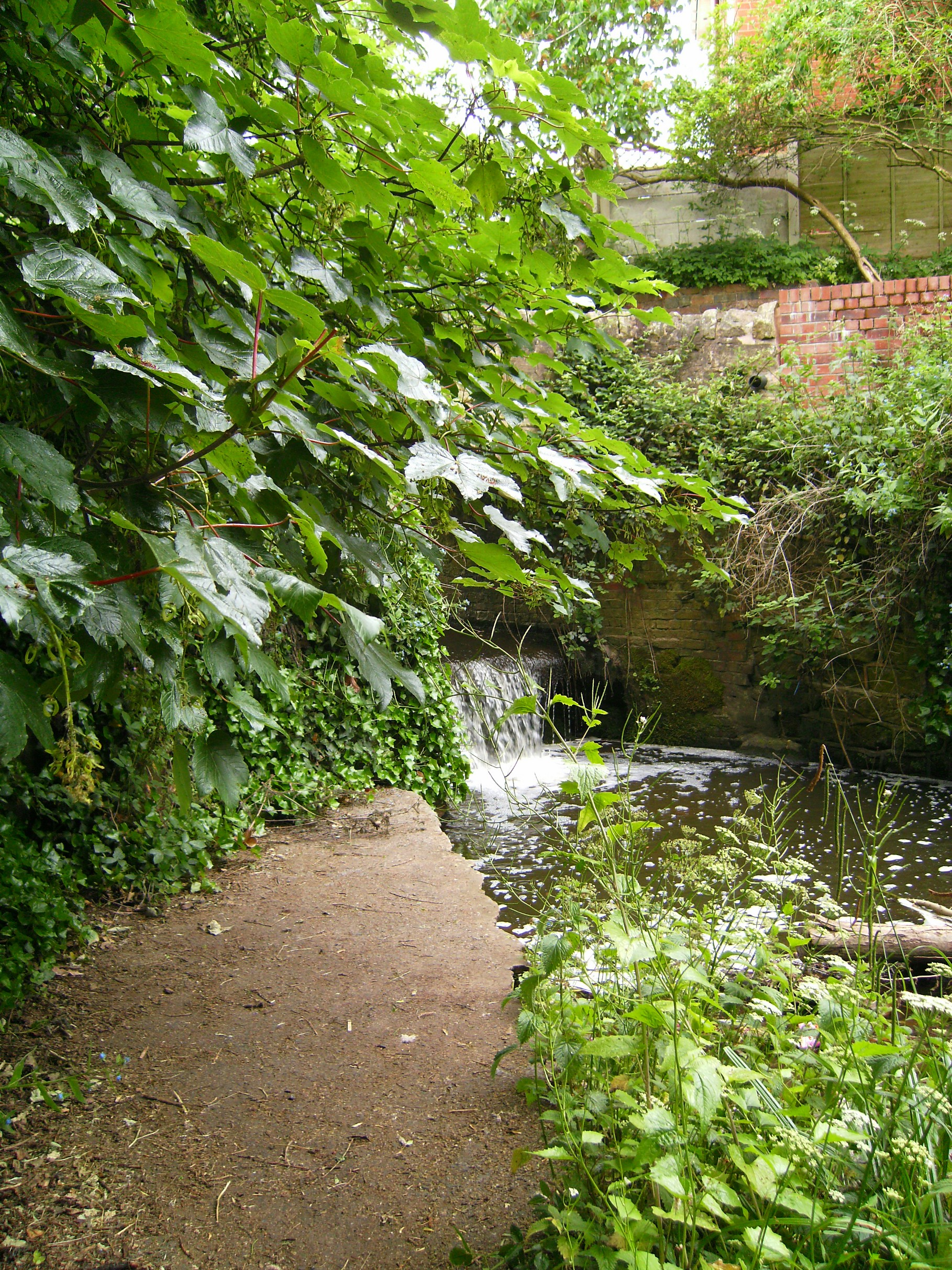
Pool Dam, the site of a former forge mill on the Wom Brook.

The Wom Brook has played an important part in the industrial history of Wombourne and the surrounding area. Despite considerable variations in flow, it provided a source of power for many centuries. Domesday, around 1086, recorded two mills already at Wombourne. These would have been undershot watermills, which were already diversifying in use beyond corn grinding in that period, although there is no precise information on how these mills were used.

From the Middle Ages, the Smestow, the Stour and their tributaries were the home of a thriving iron industry. By the 17th century, when civil and colonial strife greatly increased the demand for iron, this industry used overshot watermills to drive simple machinery for hammering, rolling, cutting, slitting and sharpening iron, smelted with local supplies of charcoal. This required considerable investment, as well as political and legal influence, as weirs or dams, and often small canals, had to be constructed to maintain a sufficient head of water. Well before 1700, there was a development of considerable enterprises, under wealthy and powerful iron-masters, who sought to control the local market through the forming of cartels. The development of coke-fired furnaces in the Industrial Revolution greatly stimulated iron-working along the Wom and other streams in the area, while the construction of the Staffordshire and Worcestershire Canal in 1770–72 made it easy to transport both raw materials and finished products in bulk.

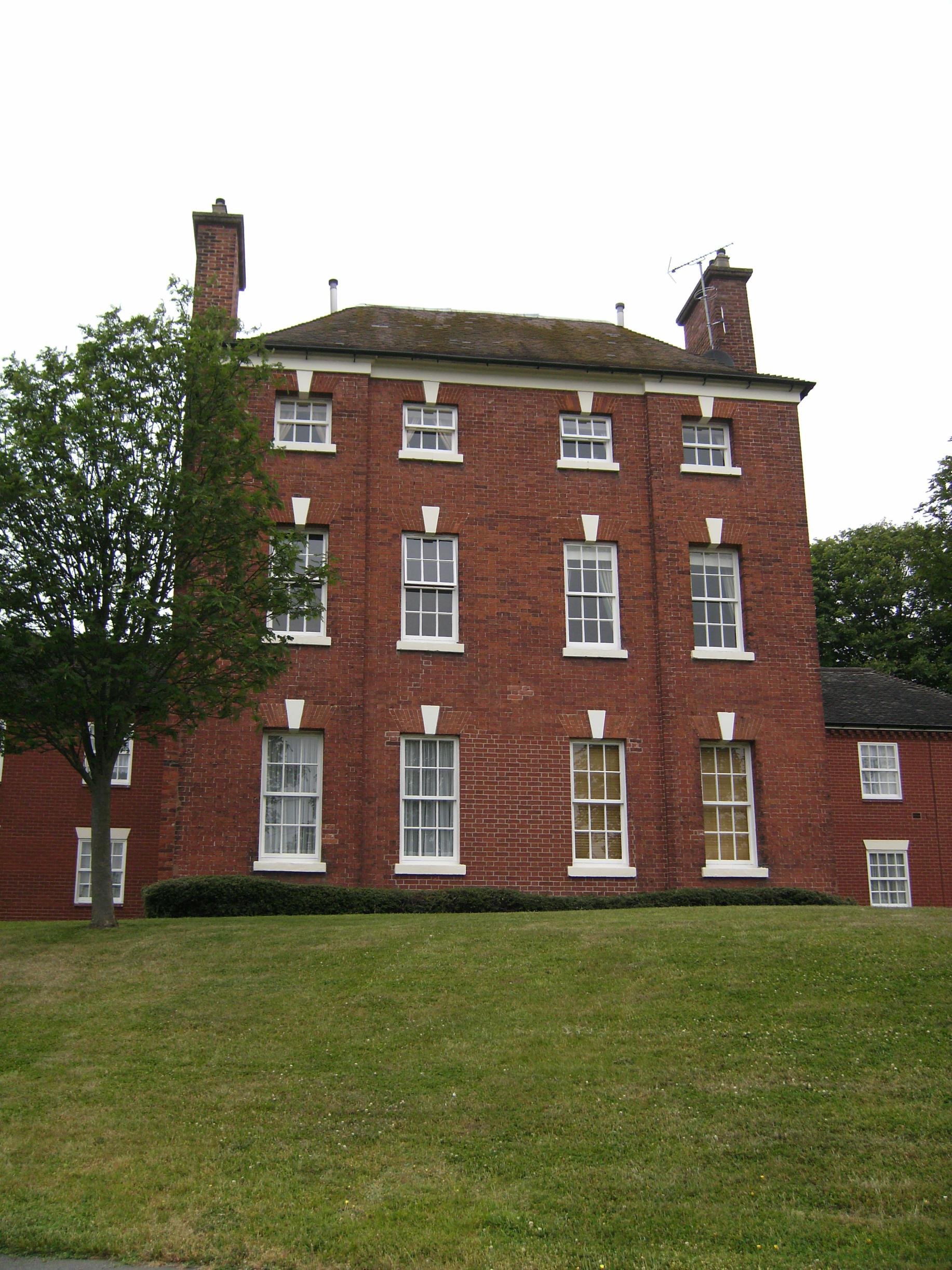
Mansion Court, a large Georgian house, now an apartment block, was originally Heath House, built by the Foley family from the profits of water power on the Wom.

The 1775 Yates map of Staffordshire shows three important mills on the Wom: at the Wodehouse, at what is now called Pool Dam and Heath Forge, near the confluence with the Smestow - the beginning of the Heath Mill complex. The pools that regularised the flow at the Wodehouse were already well-developed by this stage, providing both a steady power source and a striking landscape feature for the estate of the influential Hellier family. There had been a large watermill at the Wodehouse since at least 1570, and it has been used for fulling as well as grinding corn. The present building dates back to 1840.

In the 17th century, the Smestow had been divided north of Seisdon and a stream diverted left from the main river. Channelled by embankments, it reinforced the flow on the lower Wom, creating a mill pond with a substantial drop to power the Heath Mill. Around the start of the 19th century, the Heath Mill was developed further. The mill pool was greatly enlarged by diverting the Merryhill Brook into it, and it had to be held back by a large embankment above the small valley of the Wom. A large waterfall carried its water down to the Wom, where it powered a number of mills. A building at the pool-side, now long gone, gives its name to the large Poolhouse estate, on the western side of Wombourne and to a farm just beyond the village edge. The mill-owners, a branch of the Foley family, grew rich and constructed a large house above the Wom. The main mill was switched to grinding corn in the 1820s and continued in use for more than a further century.

The mid-19th century marked the zenith of Wombourne's contribution to the Industrial Revolution, with many of the adult population involved in nail-making a similar trades. The 1889 OS map shows a smithy close to the Pool Dam, one of the many small iron-working concerns that used the Wom for power or cooling water, as well as the larger developments at the Wodhouse and Heath. By this time, the latter used the Wom not only for power, but also to supply watercress beds and fish ponds. Millhouse Farm, close to Lower End, had grown up next to yet another mill close to the village centre.

From the mid-19th century, water power lost its importance as coal-powered steam engines became more reliable, and coal transported by the canal became more economic as a fuel. The Wom Brook lost its industrial importance long before the village of Wombourne. The mills returned to grinding corn before closing entirely and falling into neglect. With the decline of heavy industry in the West Midlands region during the 20th century, Wombourne itself became a residential and light industrial centre. Housing spread on both sides of the brook to the west of the village centre, and industrial estates along the lower course, down to the confluence with the Smestow, but the threat of flooding preserved a green corridor. Wildlife was able to re-establish and the Wom has thus taken on a new importance as a leisure and environmental amenity. The Wom Brook Walk was established in 2004 by the Friends of Wom Brook and was declared a local nature reserve by South Staffordshire Council in 2008.

== Wom Brook Walk ==
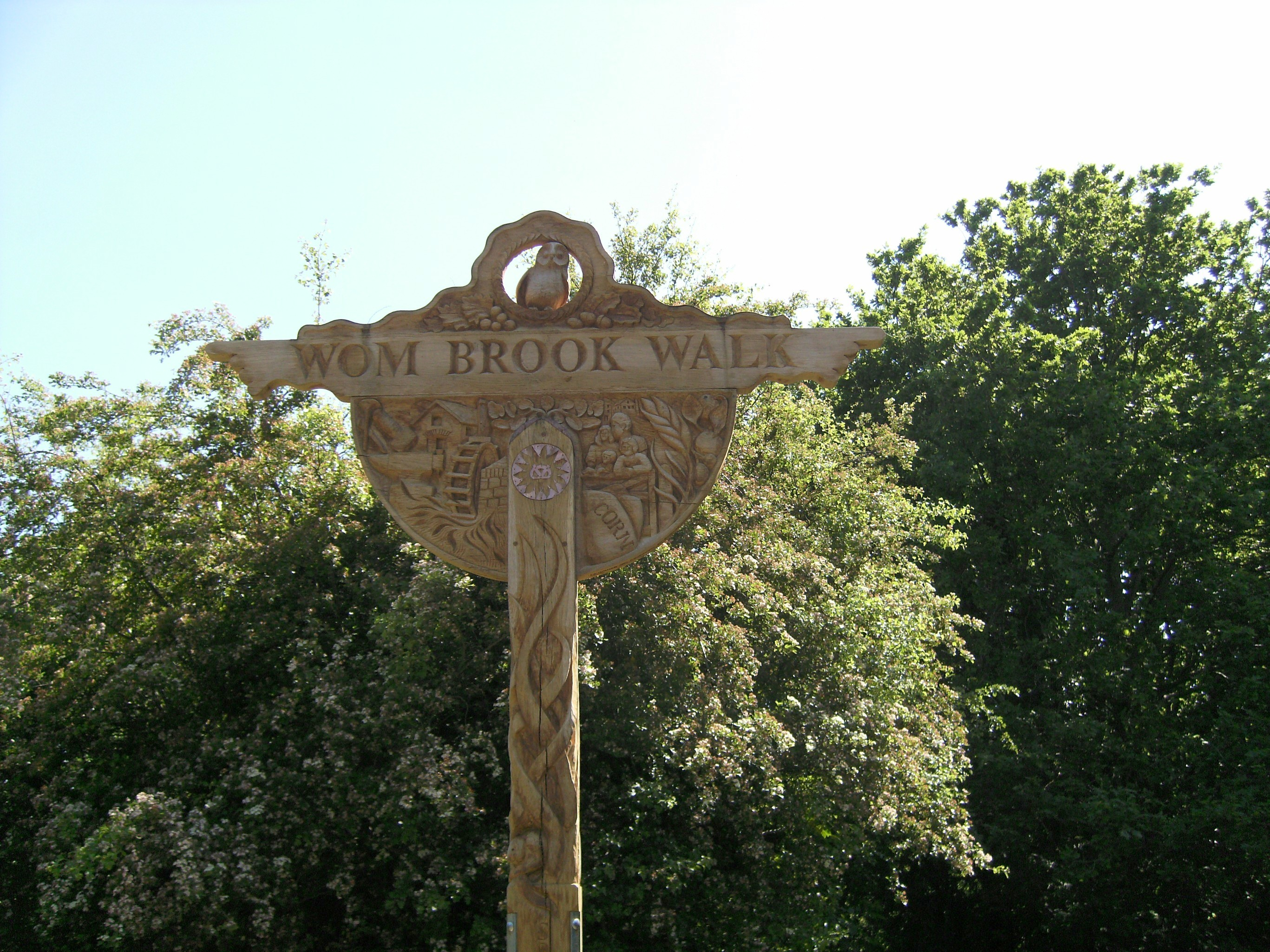
Sign at the intersection with the South Staffordshire Railway Walk, the approximate midpoint of the Wom Brook Walk

The Wom Brook Walk follows the Wom Brook stretching for about one and half miles on either one or sometimes both banks, the walk is split into four sections: Pool House estate, Giggetty, Wombourne Village West and Wombourne Village East it is possible to walk either one of the four sections or the whole walk. After being declared a local nature reserve in 2008, it received a Green Flag Award.

Starting off on the western edge of Wombourne near the Pool House estate the walks begins in a small woodland before eventually opening up into grass land with mature trees such as oak and willow.

The walk runs through a housing estate, although in a small valley. Just before the Longford, walkers can cross or linger on a small bridge, modelled on the Poohsticks bridge in Ashdown Forest. Beyond the Longford, walkers are required to make a short diversion over the canal via a pavement to the Giggetty section. This consists of scrub land and wooded banks, with the stream meandering under trees over a gravel bed.

The walk is then intersected by the South Staffordshire Railway Walk, and walkers must ascend and descend a series of paths to resume their way along the stream banks. This opens up the Wombourne Village West section, which initially goes through Ham Meadow. This is an undulating open area, close to the village centre. The meandering stream has cut a steep-sided valley through the meadow, flanked by trees.

At Lower End, walkers cross the road into the Wombourne Village east section, with a mixture of open grassy areas, giving views of the village centre, and denser woodland. Here it is possible divert a little from the path to descend to the foot of the Pool Dam, the site of an old forge mill. Finally, the eastern end of the walk is found near Rushford Bridge, which crosses the old Stafford-Worcester Road, now in the shadow of the modern A449 dual-carriageway.

The Walk is also contained entirely within the boundaries of the village of Wombourne where parking is to be found. In recent years, signs have been erected at all intersections to indicate the route, and there are information boards at many points to indicate important points of local and industrial history. The whole of the walk is accessible to wheelchair users, although the intersection with the railway walk involves steep slopes.

== Wildlife ==
In 2005 the Staffordshire Wildlife Trust completed a survey, which found an active colony of water voles.

The wildlife of Wom Brook also includes kingfishers, and dippers, along with more common species such as grey herons, long-eared bats, green woodpeckers, bees and butterflies. Wombourne's first recorded little egret was seen hunting and roosting in October/November 2010; an image of the bird was later shown in the Parish News.

== Tributaries ==
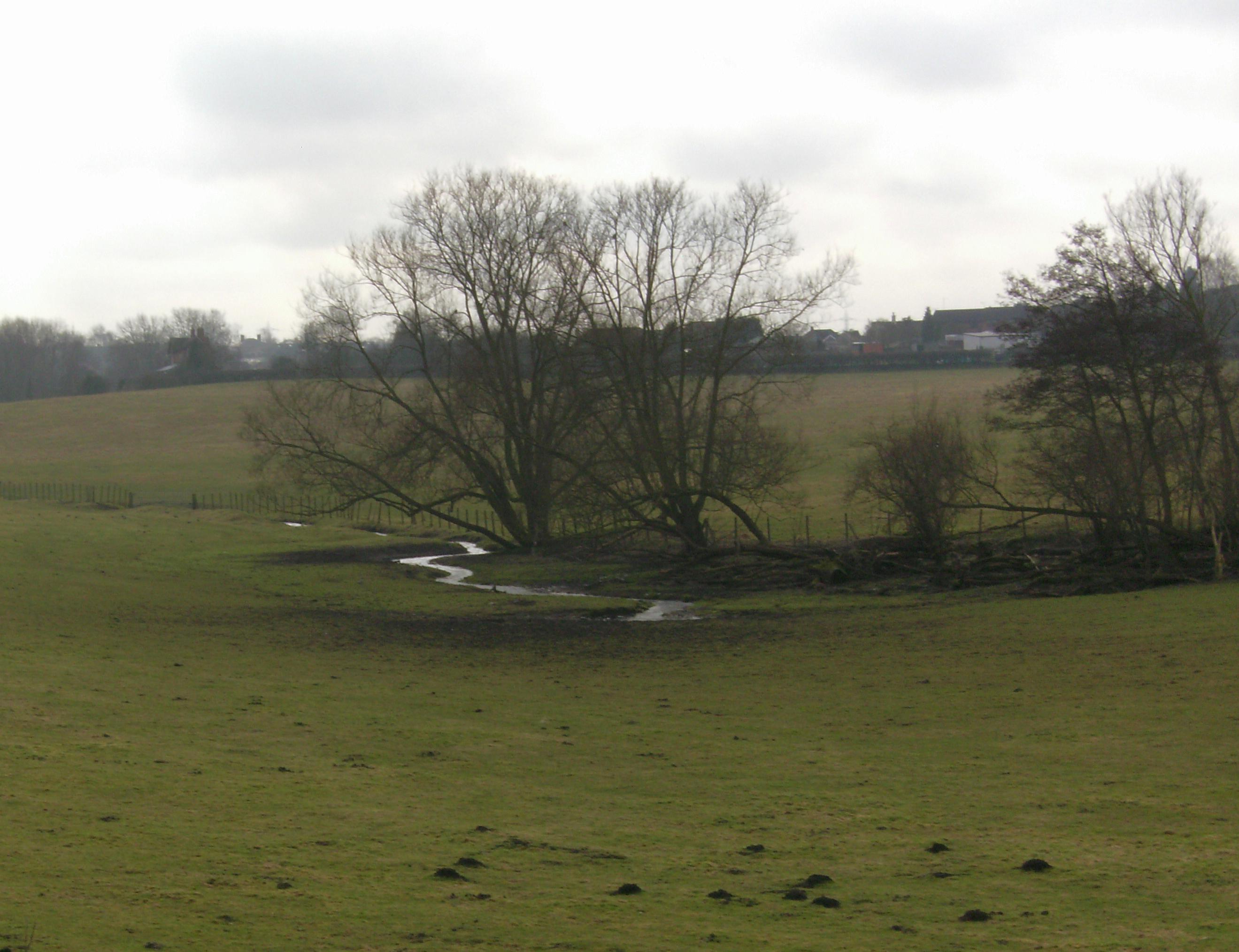
The Merryhill Brook meanders across farmland between the railway walk and the canal, close to the Bratch, north of Wombourne.

The main tributaries of the Wom Brook, starting from its confluence with the River Smestow, are:

- The Merryhill Brook. This originates on the western edge of the Colton Hills in Upper Penn, within Wolverhampton. Disappearing sometimes into culverts, it runs west and out of the city through the suburb of Merry Hill. Subject to flooding because of the impermeable clay soils of the plateau, it feeds into a storm water reservoir, before continuing westward to Dimmingsdale, on the Staffordshire and Worcestershire Canal. Here it turns south and roughly follows the course of the canal, meandering out into farmland, until it passes under the canal just south of the Bratch. It then runs alongside the canal, on its western side, disappearing briefly into a culvert, until it flows into the Wom Brook just below Longford.

- The Lyden Brook. This is one of a number of brooks which drain the area around Lloyd House, south of Wolverhampton. All flow south into the Wodehouse mill pool.

- The Penn Brook. This is essentially the upper course of the Wom Brook. The distinction between the two is artificial, as the Wom Brook simply continues the course of the Penn Brook beyond the pools at the Wodehouse, which it feeds. The Penn Brook is fed by streams running down from the eastern and southern slopes of the Colton Hills on the edge of Wolverhampton. It originates by Park Hall at Goldthorn Park. It runs east and south along the edge of Sedgley, before turning west, across Penn Common. This area is naturally very wet and has been made usable by centuries of management and improvement of the watercourses that run across it. In Victorian times it accommodated a race course, but today it is occupied by a golf course and farmland. The brook passes the old Penn Brewery, which it once supplied with water and power: today it is the Lloyd Roberts Building, an apartment block. It then flows into the mill pool, north of the Wodehouse, where it loses its identity.

For about three centuries, the River Smestow was also a tributary of its own tributary, the Wom Brook. Channels were taken from the Smestow in the Seisdon and Trysull areas to feed various mills and pools. One of these, a small contour canal, led from just north of Trysull to Heath Mill. Here it fed a very large mill pool, which was also supplied by a similar channel from further up the Wom Brook. The purpose of this scheme was probably to avoid flooding or reduction of the head of water further up the Wom Brook. These were always fertile sources of legal and political dispute among users of streams in the early modern period. The result was a large waterfall, providing a reliable source of power for the mill, which continued grinding corn until the 1930s. The channel and pool fell into disuse and were later filled in, although the route is still traceable as the main public footpath from Wombourne to Trysull.

== Settlements ==
The only sizeable settlement on the Wom Brook is the large village of Wombourne.

== Images of Wom Brook and Walk ==
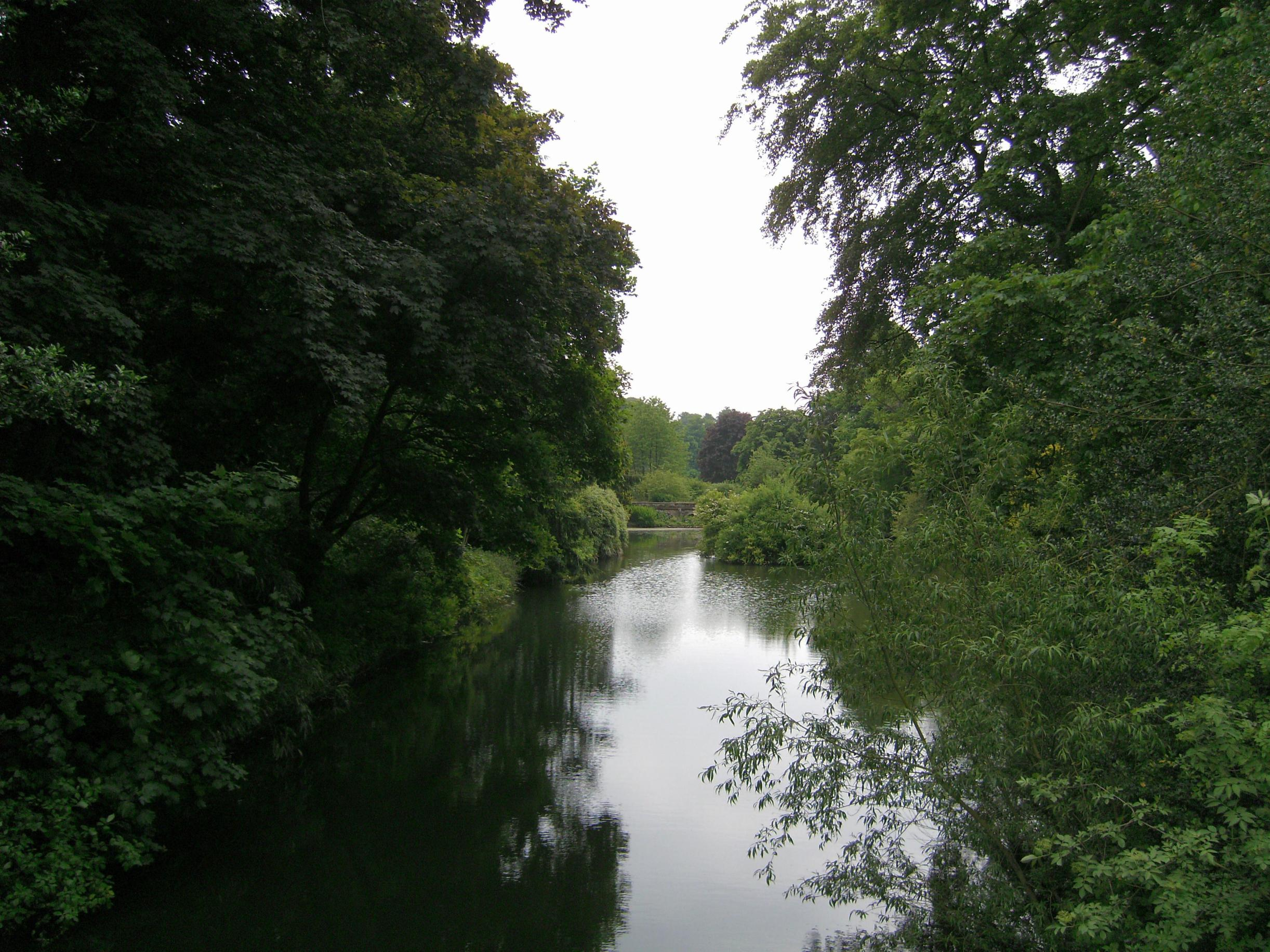
The southern pool at the Wodehouse, from which the Wom Brook flows into the village of Wombourne.

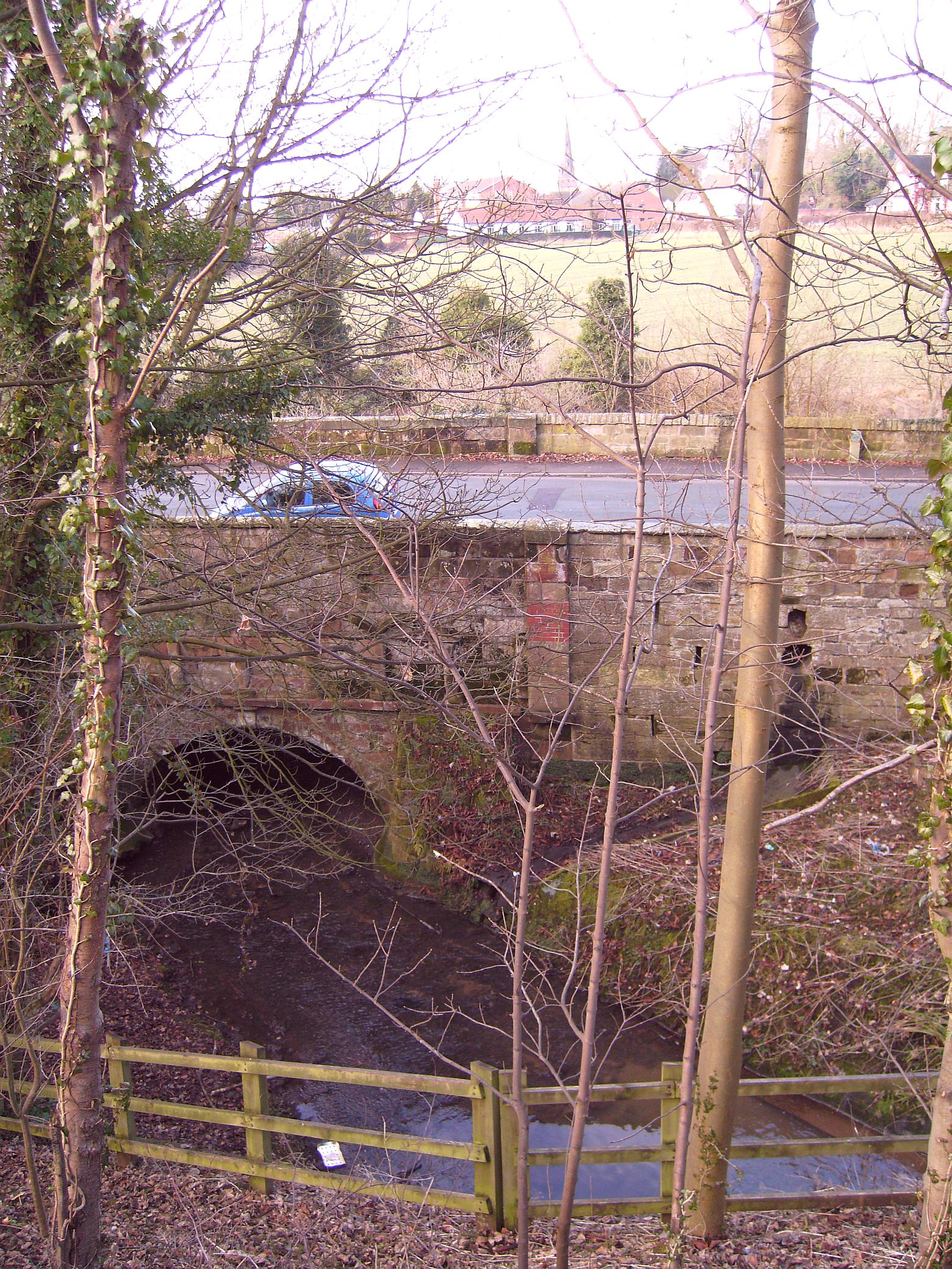
The Wom Brook at Rushford Bridge, where it enters the village under the old Stafford-Worcester Road. St Benedict Biscop's church and the village centre are visible in the background.

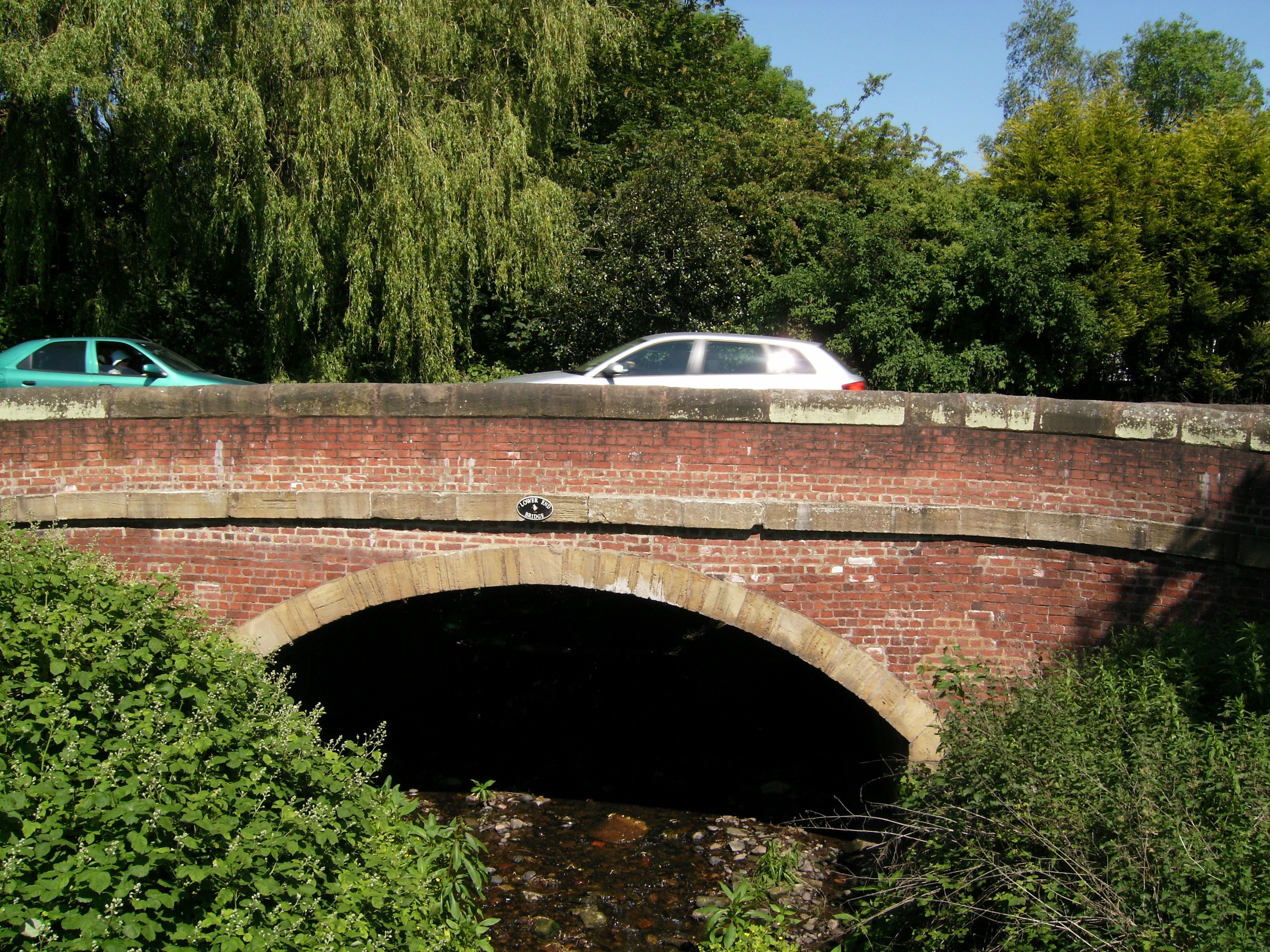
Lower End Bridge, just south-west of the village centre, marks the eastern edge of the Ham Meadow section.

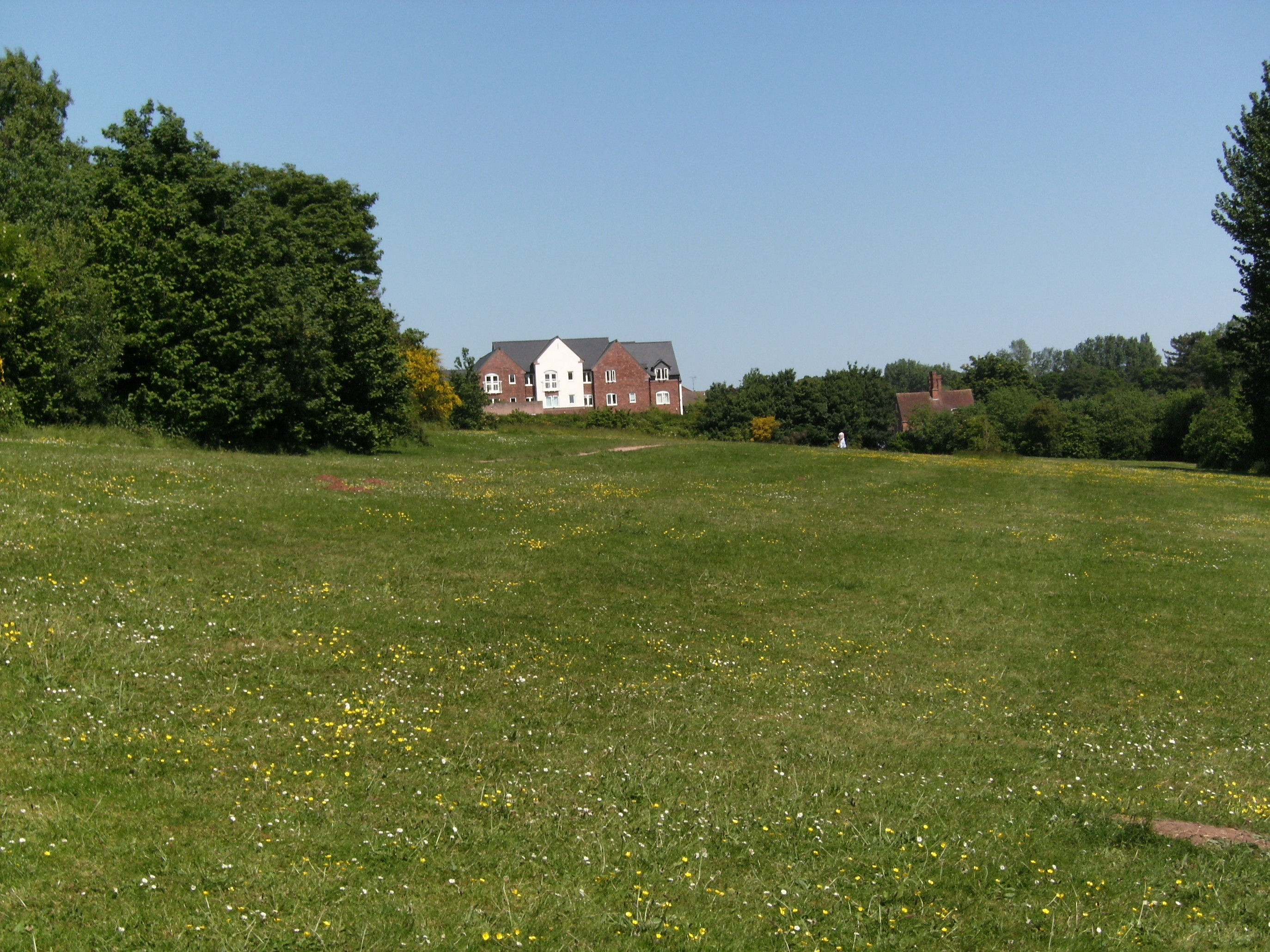
Ham Meadow, south-west of the village centre, through which flows the Wom Brook.

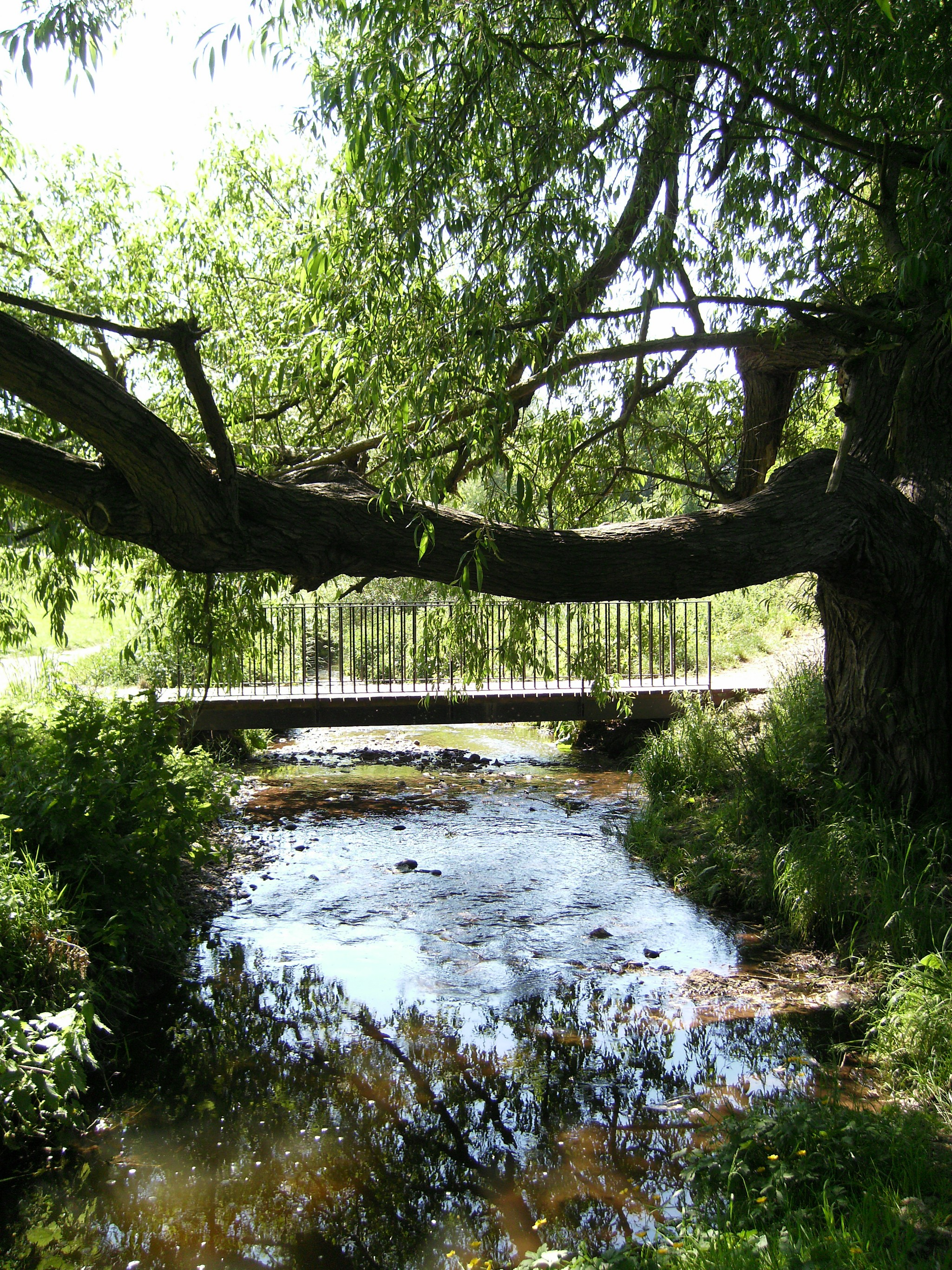
The Wom Brook in Ham Meadow.

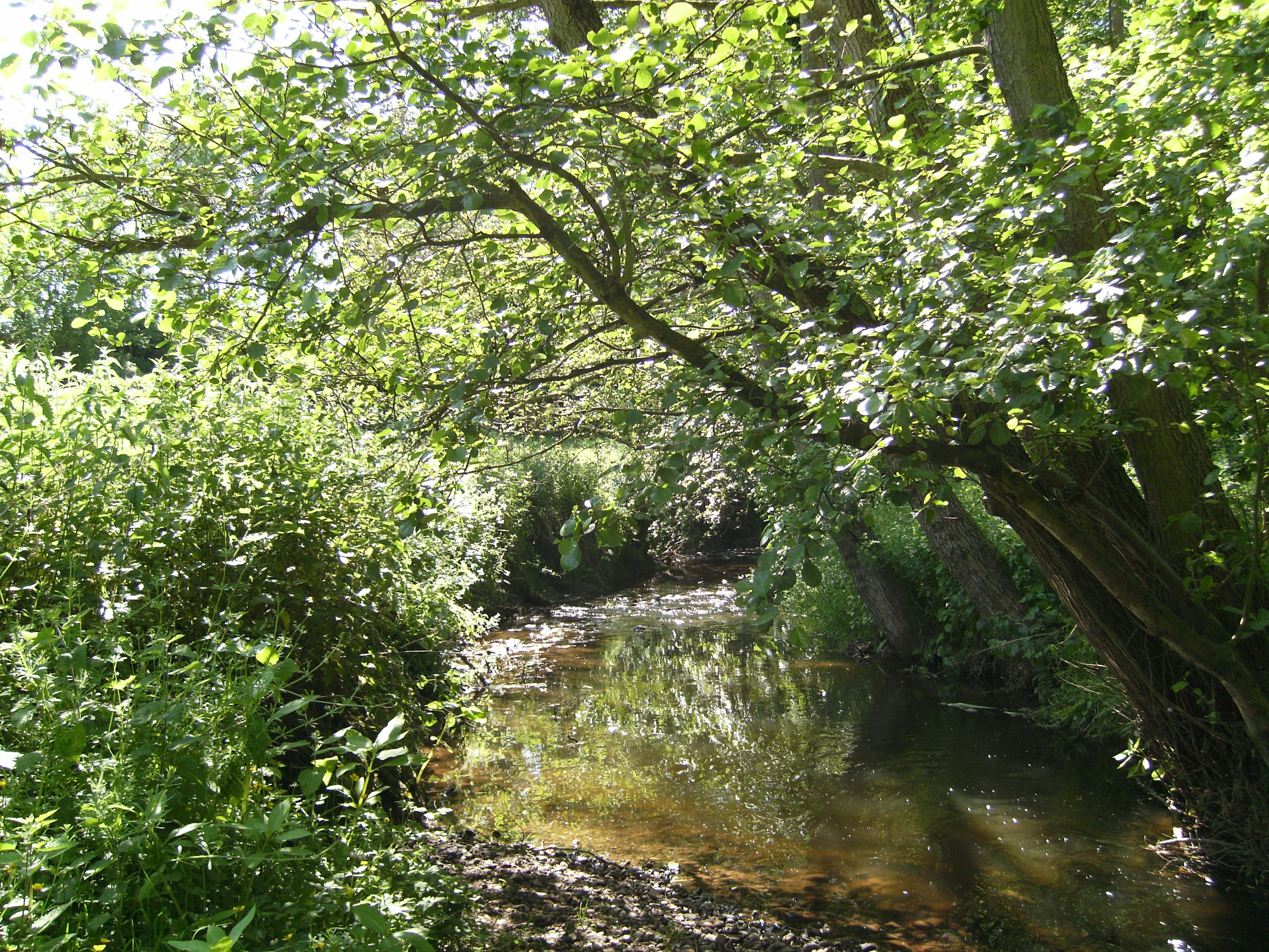
The Wom Brook along the lower part of the walk, in the Giggetty Estate

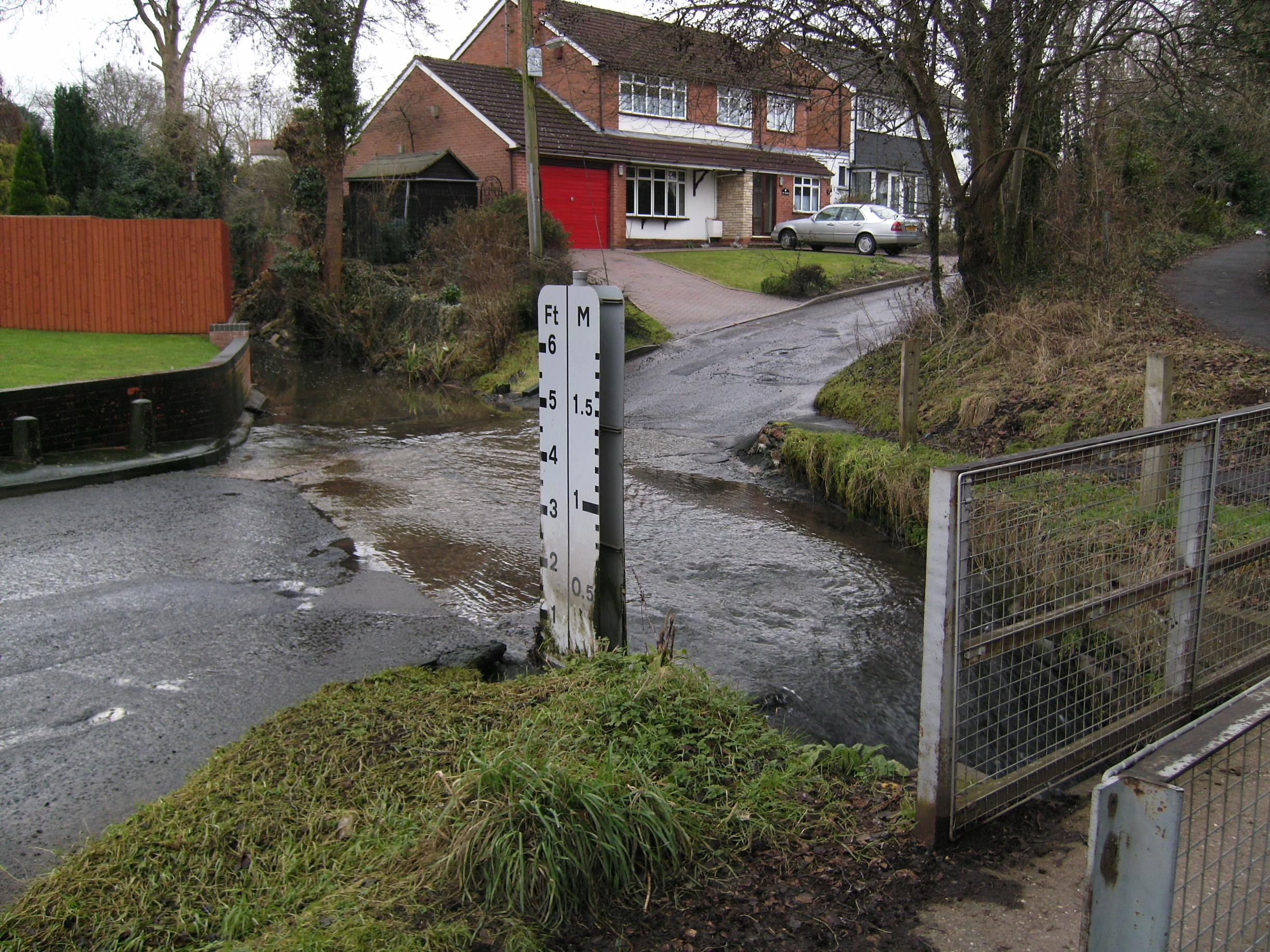
Longford, still a traffic hazard, although the gauge may be unduly pessimistic.

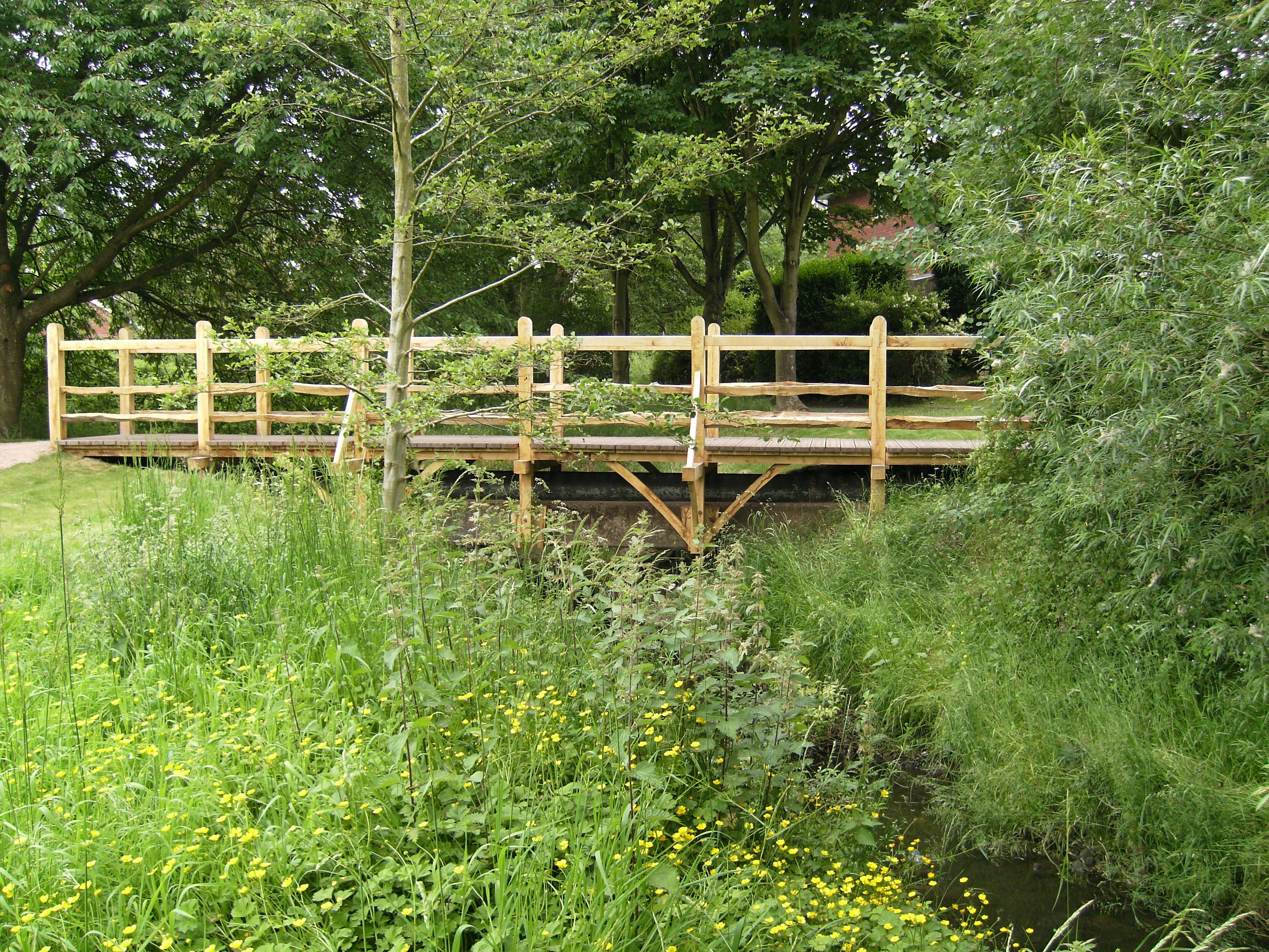
Footbridge on lower section of the walk, at Longford, by the Poolhouse Estate. It was modelled on the bridge on which A. A. Milne's characters played Poohsticks.
