= Wombourne =

Village in Staffordshire, England

Coordinates: 52.530223°N 2.185692°W

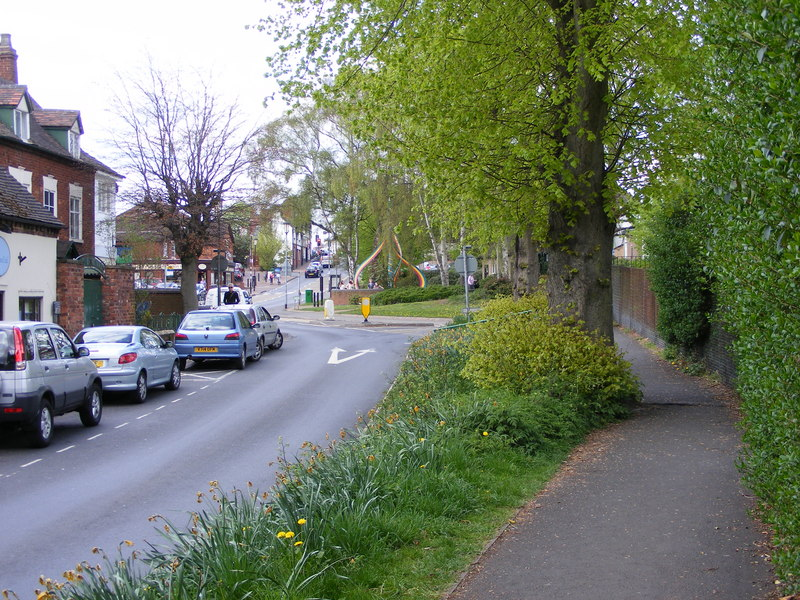
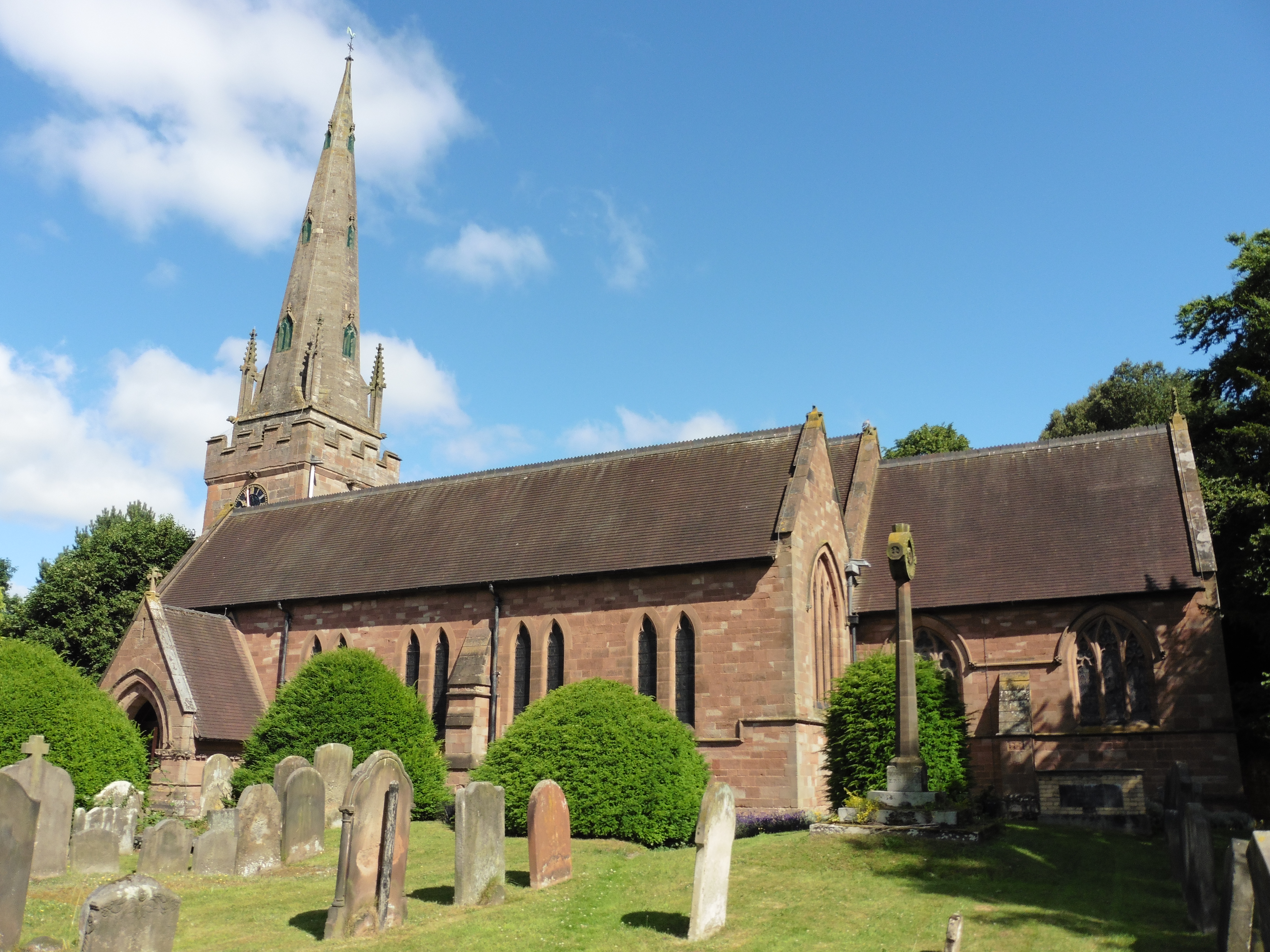
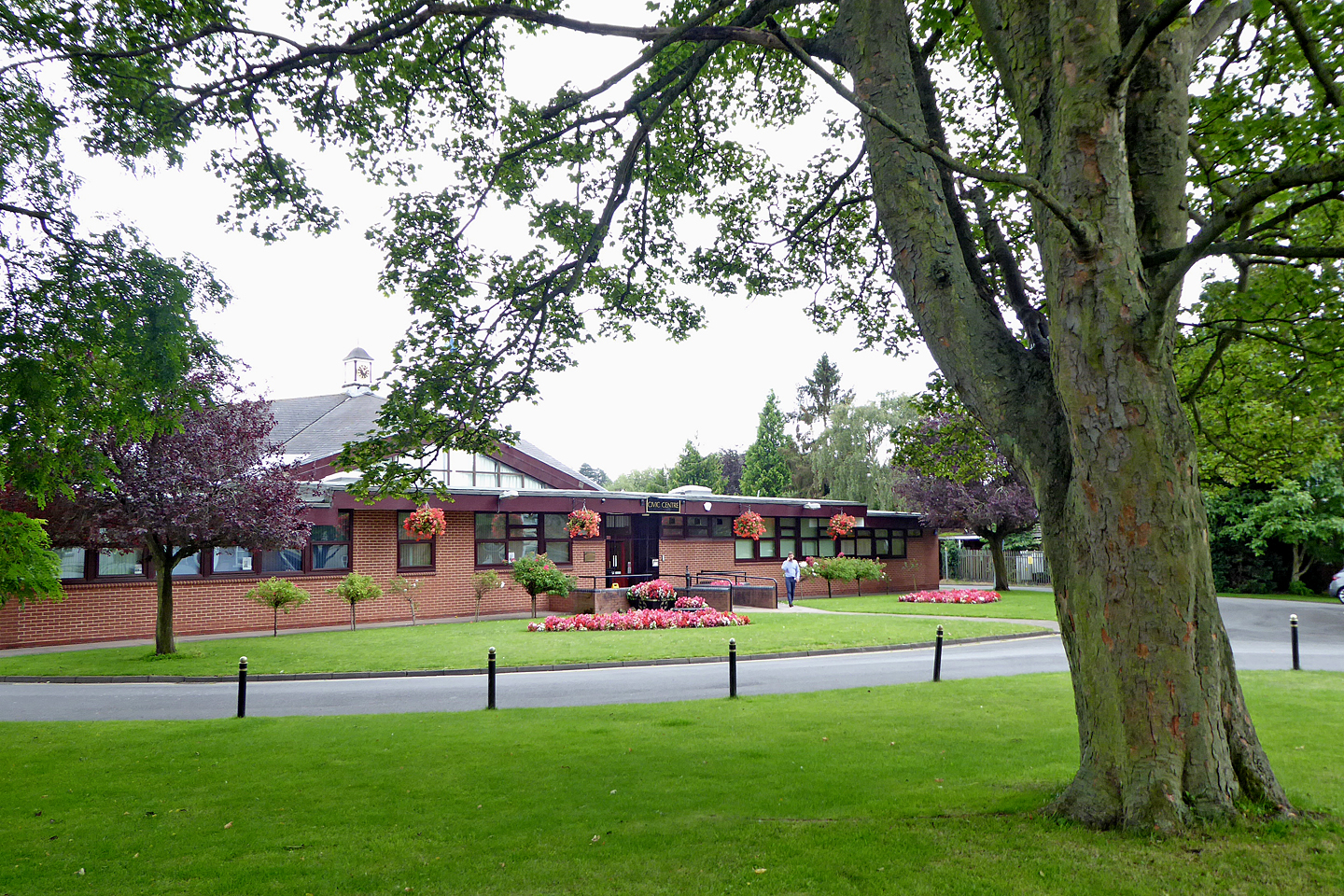
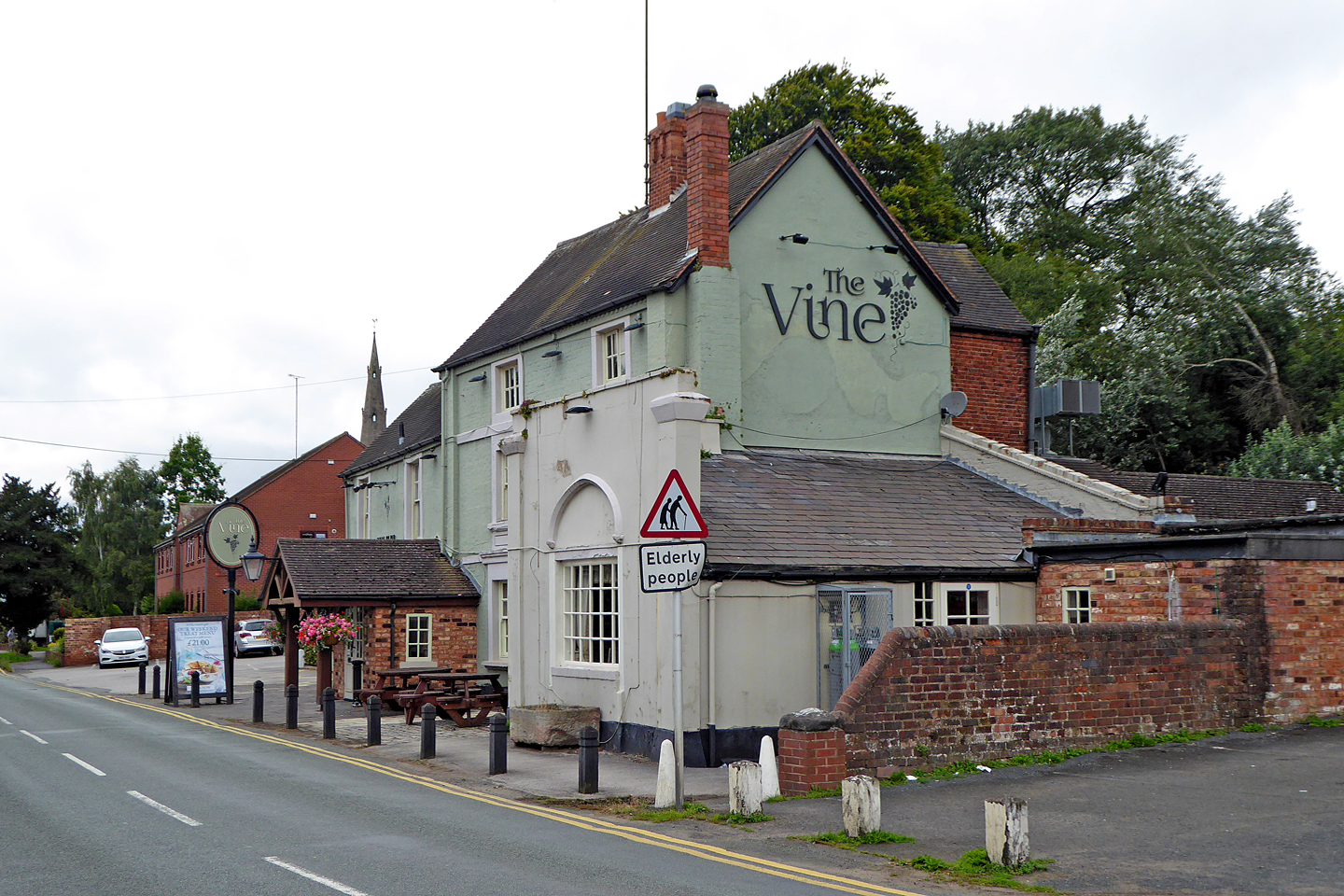
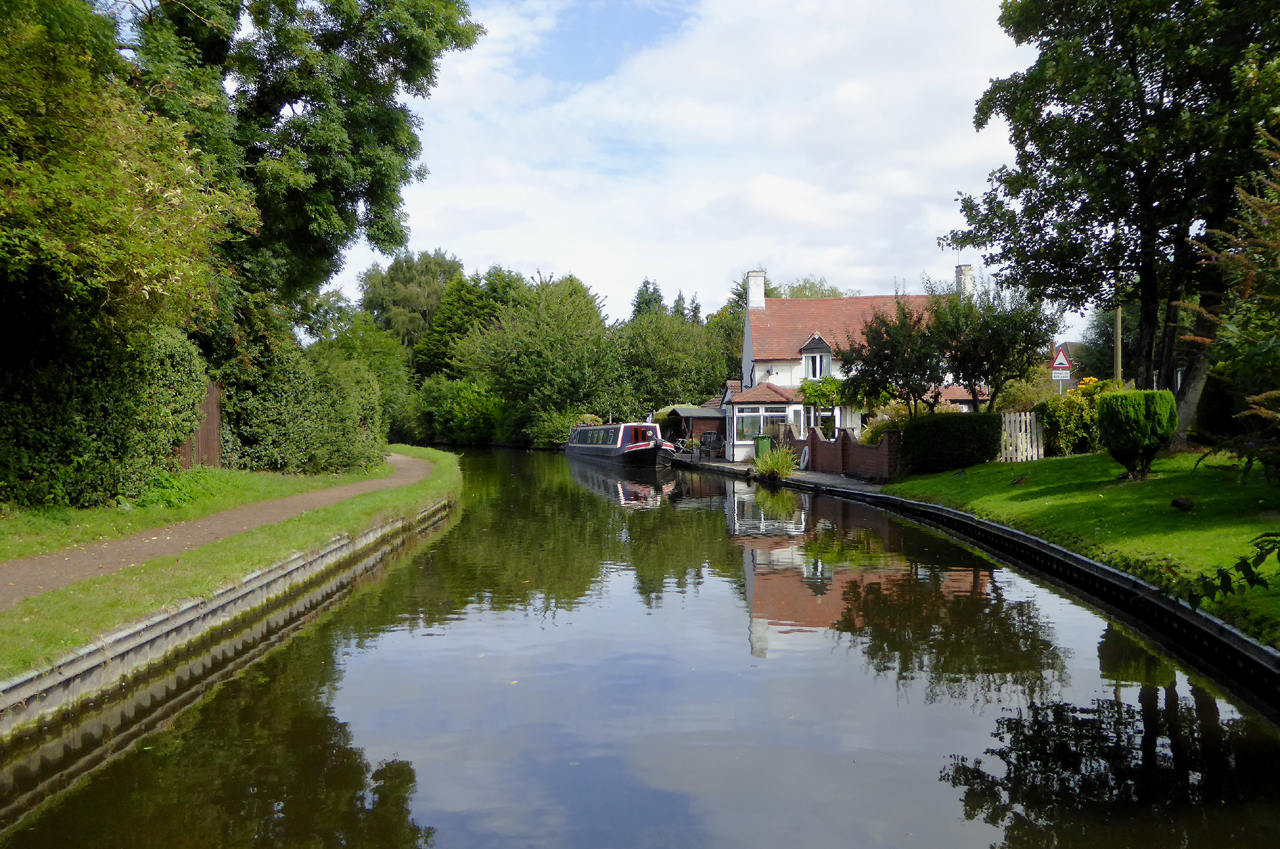
- Clockwise from top: Wombourne village centre, St Benedict Biscop church, civic centre, the Vine pub and Staffordshire and Worcestershire Canal

- Location within Staffordshire
- Population: 14,157 (2011 Census)
- OS grid reference: SO873928
- District: South Staffordshire
- Shire county: Staffordshire
- Region: West Midlands
- Country: England
- Sovereign state: United Kingdom
- Post town: Wolverhampton
- Postcode district: WV5
- Dialling code: 01902
- Police: Staffordshire
- Fire: Staffordshire
- Ambulance: West Midlands
- UK Parliament: Kingswinford and South Staffordshire

Wombourne is a large village and civil parish located in the district of South Staffordshire, in the county of Staffordshire, England. It is 4 miles (6 km) south-west of Wolverhampton and on the border with the West Midlands county.

Wombourne has a parish council. At the 2001 census it had a population of 13,691, which increased to 14,157 at the 2011 Census.

== Etymology and usage ==
The Old English word burna signifies a stream, and a stream is a notable feature of the village. Formerly the village name was thought to mean "Womb Stream", or stream in a hollow, because this is a reasonable description of the situation.

Burna was one of the terms for a stream used in the earliest Anglo-Saxon place names, and the stream was presumably itself called the Wom Bourn. However, today it is always distinguished from the village by the name Wom Brook, from another, slightly later, Old English term for a stream: brōca. The Wom Brook, which has required considerable work to ameliorate its flooding, originates on Penn Common and is a tributary of the Smestow Brook, which it meets just south of Wombourne.

The spelling "Wombourne" is correct in modern day usage. The village was marked "Wombourn" on the 1775 William Yates Map of the County of Stafford and as late as the 1945–48 series Ordnance Survey maps before being superseded by the modern day spelling.

== History ==
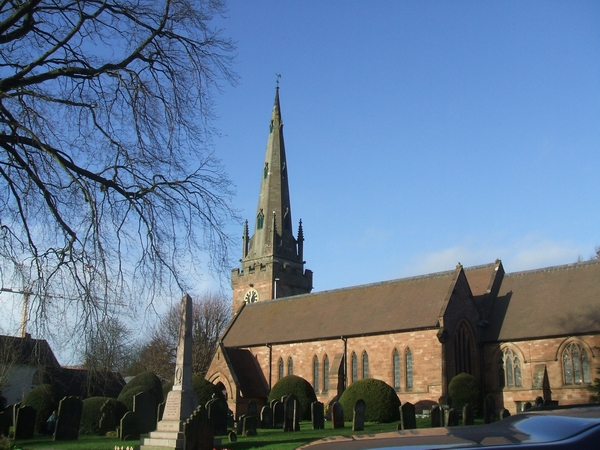
St Benedict Biscop Church, the parish church of Wombourne

=== Origins ===
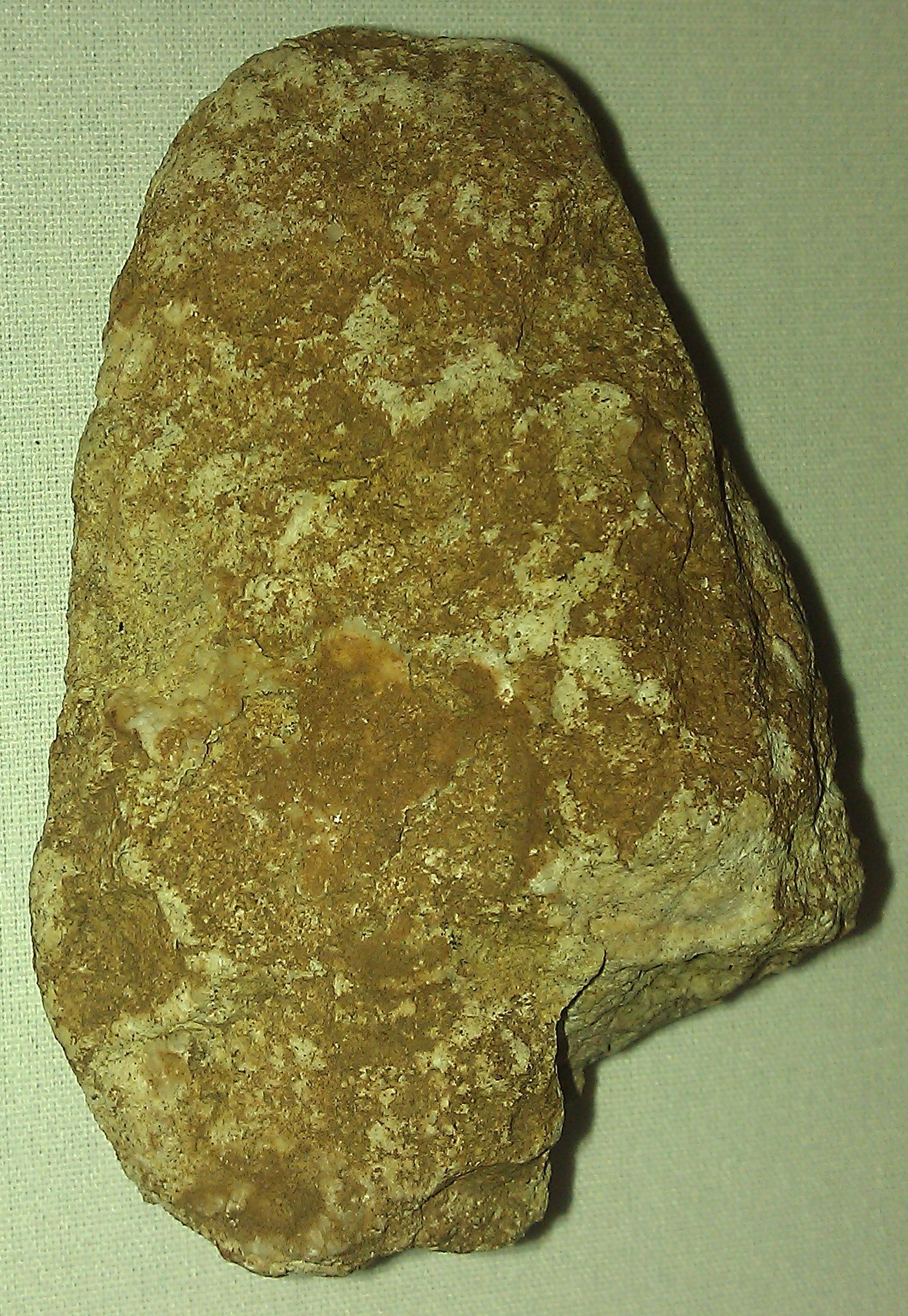
Flint axehead, likely neolithic, found at Wombourne in 1943. Now in the collection of Wolverhampton Art Gallery.

The village has Anglo-Saxon origins, and was part of the large central kingdom of Mercia, which was settled by Angles. The whole region was wooded when the Germanic settlers arrived, and hamlet names like Bratch ("newly-cleared-land") and Blakeley ("dark clearing") attest to the need to clear land for settlement. The settlers reared large herds of pigs, which were easily fed in the beech, oak and birch woods, which are the naturally-predominant vegetation in the region. Local toponyms like Kingswinford ("royal pig crossing") and Swindon ("pig hill") confirm the importance of pig rearing in Anglo-Saxon times.

=== The medieval village ===
Wombourne is mentioned in the Domesday Book of 1086, and was clearly a medium-sized village by the standards of the time. Before the Norman Conquest, it was owned by an Anglo-Saxon nobleman called Thorsten. By the time of the Domesday survey, William Fitz Ansculf held seven hides of land, some of them let from him by one Ralph of Wombourne. William was an important landowner throughout the West Midlands, the son of Ansculf of Picquigny, a Picard baron who came to England with William the Conqueror and built a castle at Dudley. William's total holding at Wombourne supported 8 ploughs and was worth £3. There were 13 villagers (probably not including dependents, so perhaps thirty to forty people in total); a priest, and so perhaps some sort of church; as well as two mills, the first evidence for the importance of water power in the area. Wombourne was part of the Seisdon Hundred.

The Priors of Dudley built or rebuilt the Parish Church of St Benedict Biscop around 1170, the only parish church dedicated to this Anglo-Saxon cleric. The building as it is seen today, however, is the result of numerous reconstructions and refurbishments, with a near-complete rebuilding undertaken 1866–1867 to the designs of George Edmund Street. However, the 14th-century west tower survives. The parish of Wombourne extended far from the village, taking in Orton and Swindon.

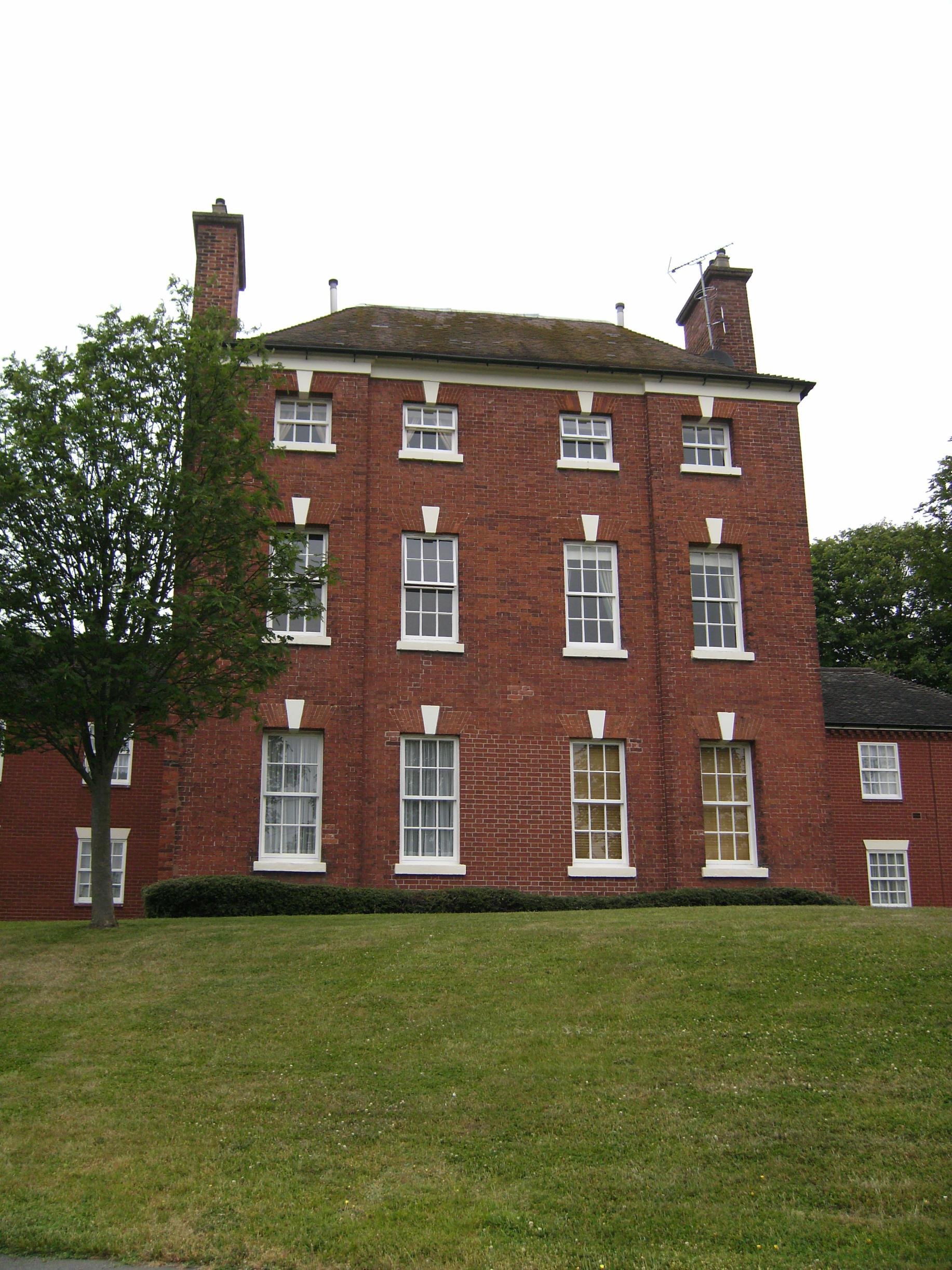
The former Heath House, a residence of the Foley family attached to their industrial complex at Heath Mill. Today it is an apartment block, known as Mansion Court.

=== Industrial developments ===
For most of its history Wombourne was mainly an agricultural village. However, its involvement with industry began unusually early. From the Middle Ages, the Smestow Brook and the Stour were lined with small iron bloomeries and forges, using local reserves of charcoal and water. The Industrial Revolution brought coke-fired furnaces. In 1772, the Staffordshire and Worcestershire Canal was opened, with major canal locks at the Bratch and Bumble Hole, integrating the area more closely into industrial Britain. Iron production concentrated in a smaller number of centres – at Swindon, in the southern part of the Wombourn parish, at Gothersley, at the Hyde near Kinver, and increasingly in the nearby Black Country – using the canal to bring ore, coal and limestone to the works. Other villages, however, remained centres for smithing, with cheaper and more available iron greatly increasing the number of workers. Increasingly, Wombourne became a centre for nail-making. The Wom and the Smestow continued to provide both power and cooling water, with several large mills along each stream by the late 18th century.

Perhaps the largest water-driven forge was to the west of the village, where, an 1817 history remarks, "has been erected an iron-work called the Heath-forge, with genteel mansion". This works had a large mill pool, supplied by the Merryhill Brook and by a contour canal from the River Smestow. Water fell thence in several stages to the Wom, which then joined the Smestow a short distance to the west. The forge mill was later converted into a corn mill, which functioned until the 1930s. The Heath Mill industrial estate on the main Bridgnorth road preserves the name of the complex. The mansion building, now converted into flats, is still to be seen in the Poolhouse estate, itself named after the poolhouse that stood at the dam. The water mill is clearly marked on the 1775 Yates map of Staffordshire, along with one at the Wodehouse, and another just south of the village centre, the remains of which are now the Pool Dam.

It was around the same time that the Hellier family reached the peak of their influence in the area. The Helliers lived at the Wodehouse, on the Wom Brook, to the east of the village. It was the fourth Samuel Hellier, knighted in 1762, who turned the Jacobean house into a centre of culture. He had the grounds laid out in fashionable style, with a hermitage, a temple to the memory of Handel, and a music room. He spent a fortune on musical instruments and books of music, building up a private collection and endowing both the church at Wombourne and St. John's, Wolverhampton. The family collection included the Stradivarius named after them. Dying without issue in 1784, he left his property to a family friend, the Reverend Thomas Shaw, on condition he change his name to Hellier. One of his descendants spent years as commandant of the Royal Military School of Music at Kneller Hall. It is claimed that the Wodehouse has not been sold for over 900 years.

In 1851, Wombourne was described by William White as a large village, "occupied chiefly by nailors, who work for the neighbouring manufacturers". Nail-making remained important into the 20th century. As White implies, it was mainly the preserve of outworkers, who operated small-scale machinery in, or attached to, their own homes, fetching iron sheet or rod from the foundries and returning the finished product.

White tells us that the main landowners in the area in the mid-19th century were John Wrottesley, 2nd Baron Wrottesley, a notable astronomer, and Lord Ward – at this time the Reverend William Humble Ward, the tenth Baron, a relative of the Earl of Dudley. The Wards made their wealth not merely from land, but what lay under it: the coal and limestone of the West Midlands. Another important landowner, the Reverend William Dalton, was an Evangelical clergyman from Ulster, but he owed his wealth to marriage to the widow of a Bilston iron master.

=== The Modern Village ===
Although the parish had a population approaching 2,000 by the mid-19th century, the village itself remained quite small – essentially confined to the area around the present village green. The hamlets of Giggetty, Blakeley, Ounsdale, and the Bratch were quite separate from the village and were only absorbed into it as suburban housing spread from the mid-20th century. This changed the whole character and structure of the village.

The area around the green, the original village of Wombourne, evolved as the commercial and cultural centre. The green was surrounded by small, independent shops, which remain a distinctive feature of the village's commercial life. A new civic centre, housing local council services, was constructed near Lower End, just south west of the centre. Suburban housing grew to form a wide ring around it, absorbing most of the hamlets.

In the 1950s, several hundred council houses were built around Wombourne by Wolverhampton council as part of an overspill rehousing programme for residents of the large town's slums.

Large housing developments of the 1960s and 1970s around Giggetty and Brickbridge, to the west, were followed by a still larger westward extension in the Poolhouse estate of the 1980s, which absorbed the former Heath Mill. Meanwhile, light industry developed along the canal and the River Smestow, particularly beyond the main Bridgnorth Road, with industrial estates replacing former foundries. A new bypass was opened to the south of the village in July 1988, carrying Dudley, Bridgnorth and Telford traffic around Wombourne and Himley, and clearly separating much of the industrial area from the residential section. With Wombourne becoming an increasingly popular residential area, mass housing development continued into the new millennium, with building to the west of the canal between Ounsdale and the Bratch.

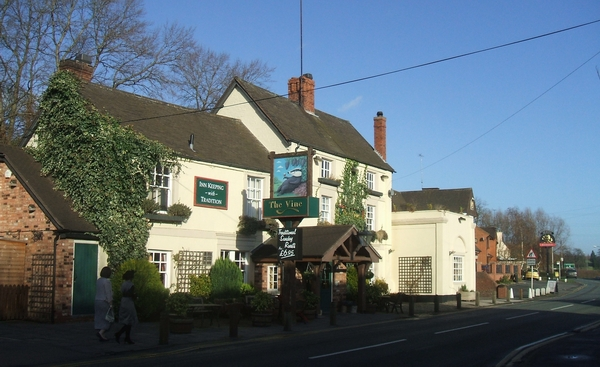
The Vine, a pub on the edge of Wombourne village opposite the police station

The Staffordshire and Worcestershire Canal runs north–south through the western side of the village and Bratch Locks are located just to the north-west.

== Walks and Local Countryside ==
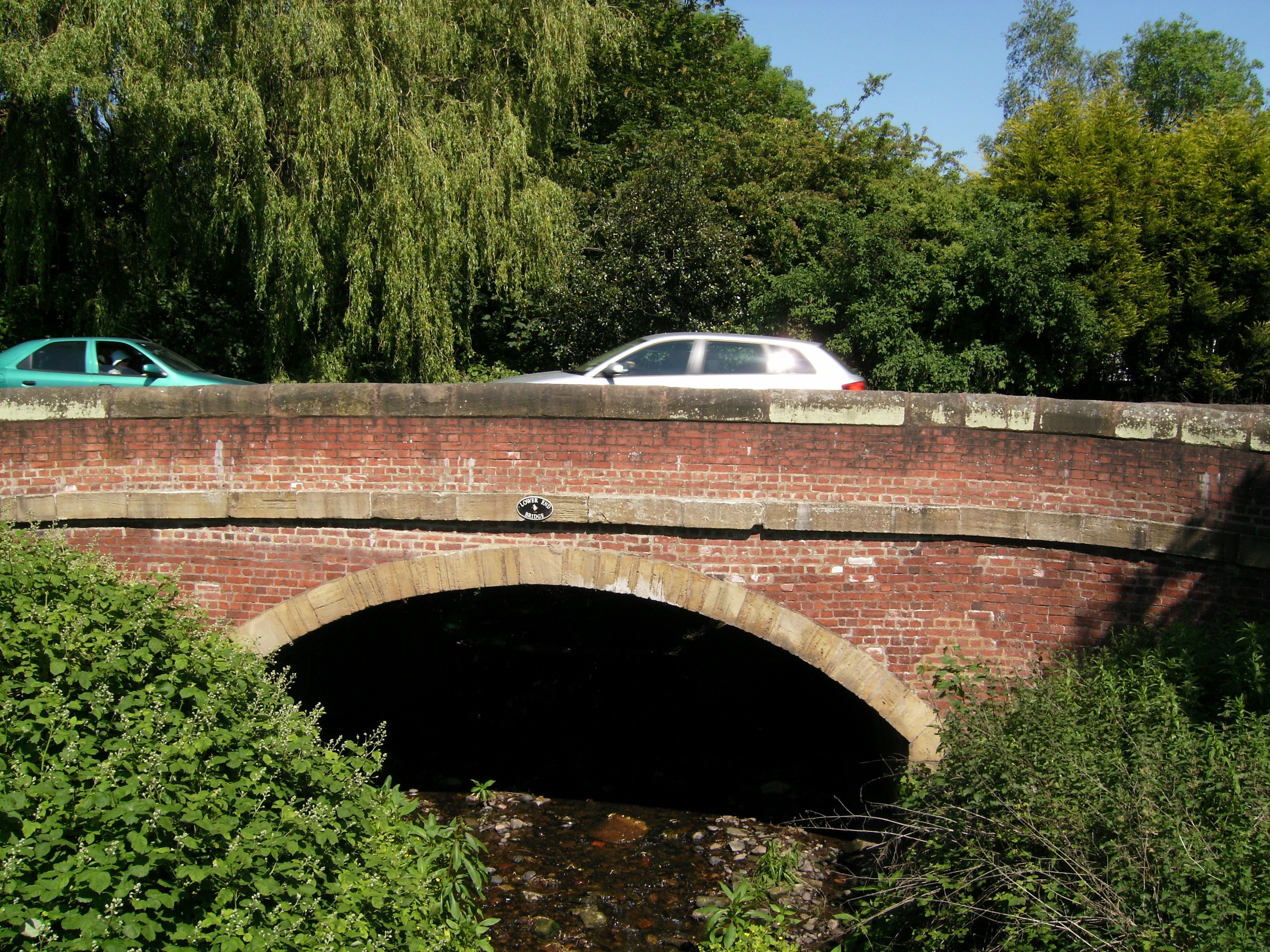
Lower End Bridge, just south-west of the village centre, marks the eastern edge of the Ham Meadow section.

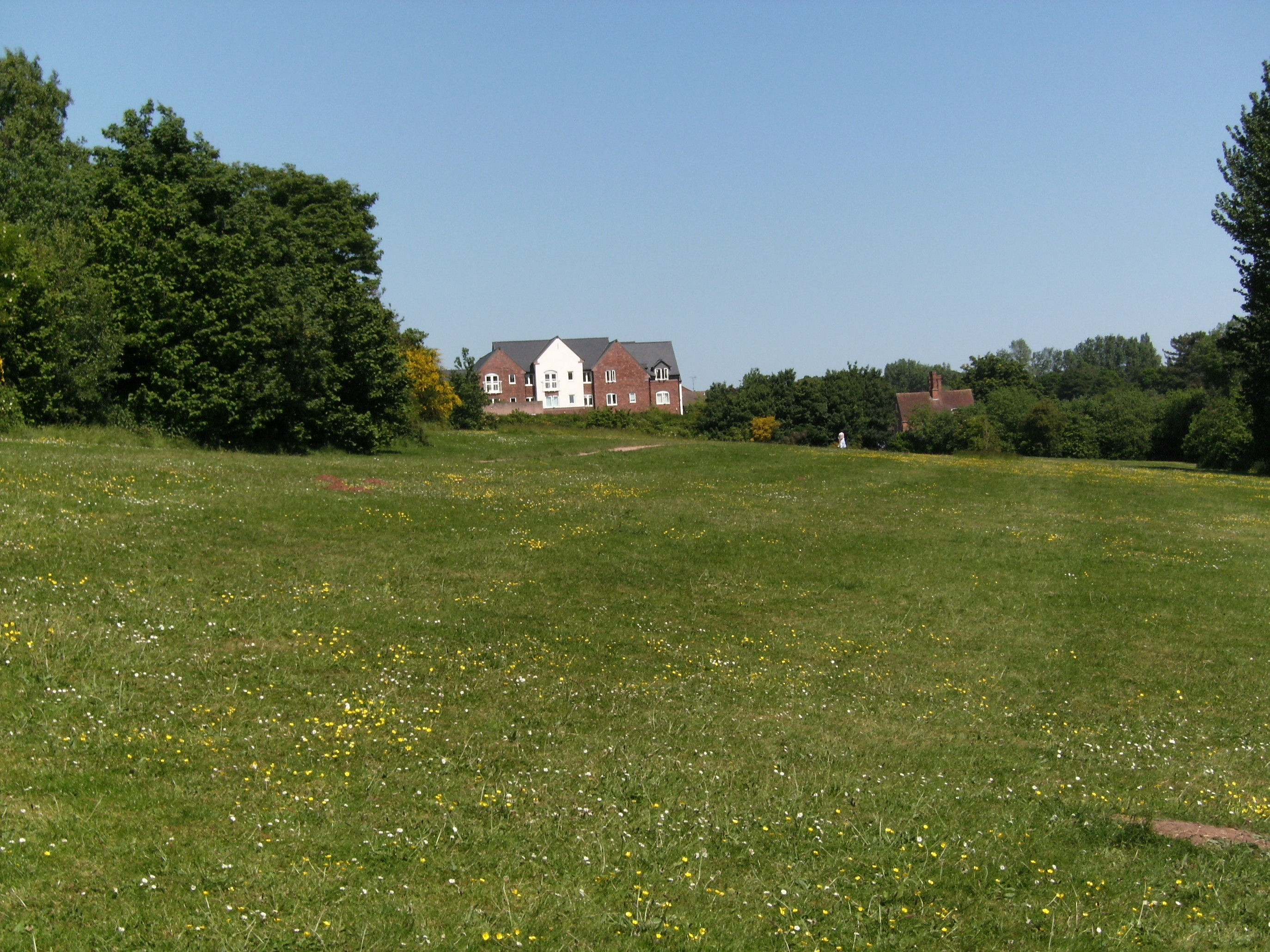
Ham Meadow, south-west of the village centre, through which flows the Wom Brook.

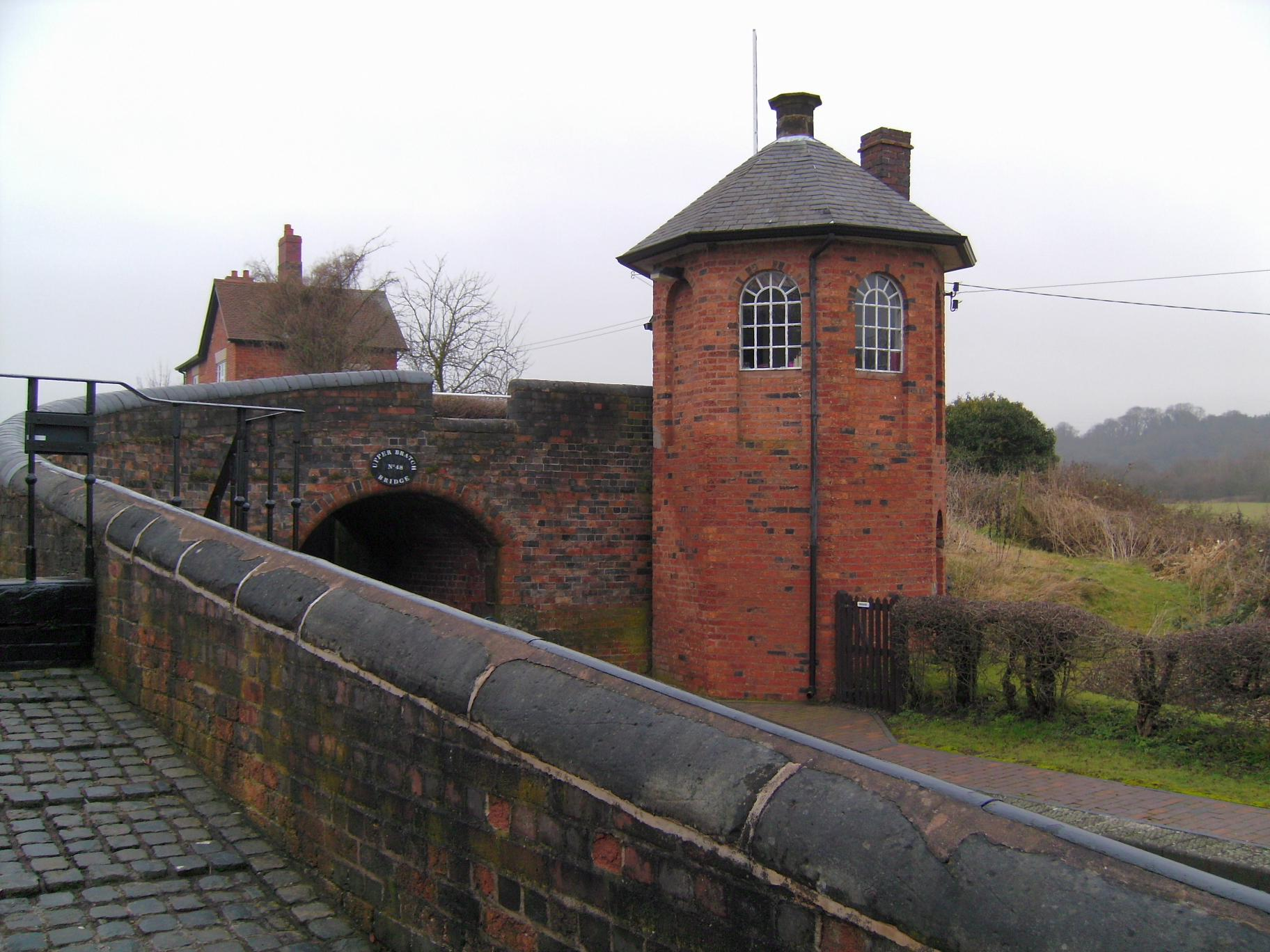
The nearby Bratch Locks.

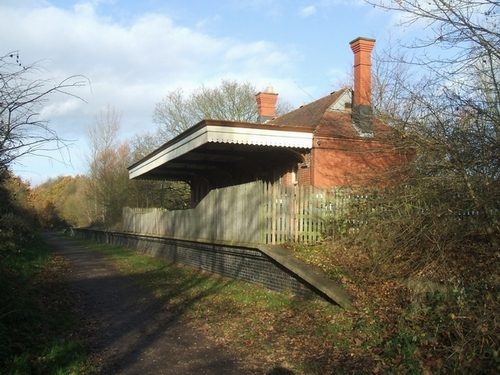
Wombourne Railway Station on the South Staffordshire Railway Walk.

A number of important footpaths cross Wombourne, constituting an important leisure amenity as well as providing safe access to the village and surrounding countryside for walkers and cyclists.

=== The Wom Brook Walk ===
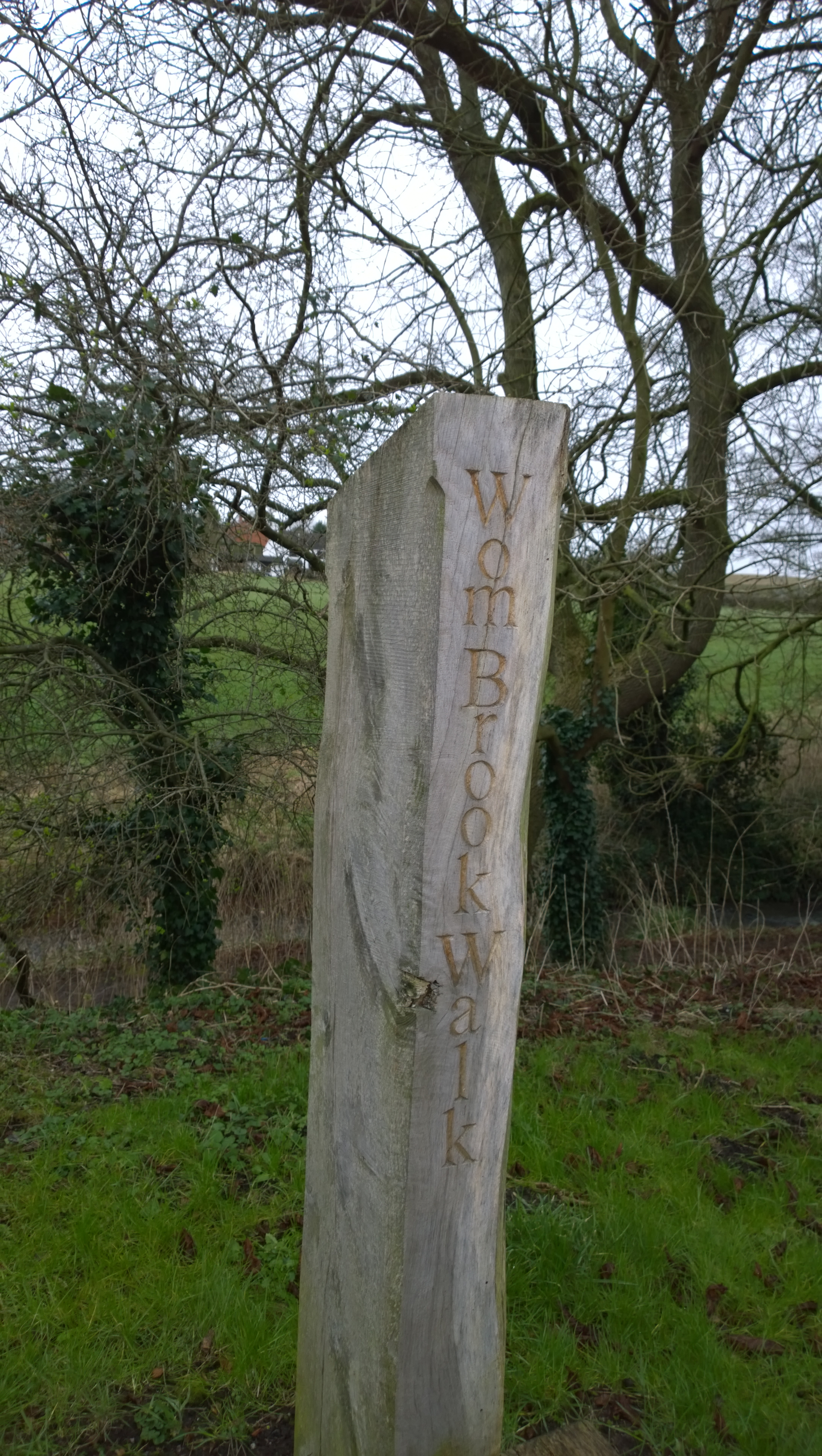
Signpost for the Wom brook Walk at Wombourne, Staffordshire

The Wom Brook Walk is a Local Nature Reserve entirely within the boundaries of the village. It stretches for about 1.5 miles (2.6 km) along both sides of the Wom Brook, traversing the village from east to west. It contains a mix of meadow and woodland. It was established after some years of work by a local conservation group, the Friends of Wom Brook. There has been great excitement over the arrival of Wombourne's very first Little Egret in October/November 2010. It was seen hunting and roosting around the Wombrook on a number of occasions and Daniel Traynor captured the very first image of the bird which was later shown in the Parish News.

=== The South Staffordshire Railway Walk ===
The South Staffordshire Railway Walk is another Local Nature Reserve. It follows the course of the former Wombourne Branch Line, traversing Wombourne from north to south, before swinging east towards Himley and Dudley. It intersects with the Wom Brook Walk at the western end of Ham Meadow. To the north, it connects with the Wolverhampton Railway Walk, affording a pedestrian route into Wolverhampton via the Smestow Valley LNR. The former Wombourne station at the Bratch has car parking facilities, as well as a café and information.

=== The Staffordshire and Worcestershire Canal ===
The tow path of the Staffordshire and Worcestershire Canal also runs north–south through the western part of Wombourne, roughly parallel with the South Staffordshire Railway Walk and intersecting with the Wom Brook Walk at Giggetty. It forms part of a conservation area and can be followed as far as Kidderminster and Stourport on Severn to the south and Wolverhampton and Stafford to the north.

=== Surrounding area ===
As well as the walks in or passing through Wombourne, there are also many country parks and places to walk in the surrounding area including: Baggeridge Country Park, Highgate Common, Himley Hall and Kinver Edge.

== Governance ==
Wombourne is part of a two-tier local government structure, typical of rural county areas in England.

- It is situated within the district of South Staffordshire. This is based in Codsall, to the north of Wombourne, although it has district offices locally. It was established in 1974 by the merging of Seisdon Rural District, to which Wombourne had belonged, with Cannock Rural District. Wombourne consists of three district council wards, each represented by three councillors: Wombourne North and Lower Penn; Wombourne South West; Wombourne South East.

- South Staffordshire itself is contained within the county of Staffordshire. This was established as an administrative county in 1889. Wombourne constitutes a single division in County Council elections: South Staffordshire – Wombourne.

Wombourne also has a parish council. This was originally established in 1894 and took its present form in 1974.

Wombourne is part of the South Staffordshire parliamentary constituency, which is not coterminous with the district of the same name.

Prior to Brexit in 2020, it was also part of the large West Midlands constituency, which had seven MEPs in the European Parliament.

Before the local government reforms of the 19th century, the local parish or vestry was both a civil and an ecclesiastical unit within the Seisdon Hundred of the historic county of Staffordshire. In Victorian times, it became part of the Seisdon Poor Law Union.

== Politics ==
Wombourne's Member of Parliament is Mike Wood, who represents the South Staffordshire constituency in the House of Commons after Sir Patrick Cormack stepped down in the 2010 general election. He is a Conservative. In elections to the European Parliament, Wombourne was part of the West Midlands constituency which was last represented by seven MEPs: 3 Conservative, 2 Labour, 1 Liberal Democrat and 1 UK Independence Party. All nine of Wombourne's district councillors are Conservative and the district council is Conservative-controlled.

== Transport ==
National Express West Midlands bus routes 15, 16 and 16A serve Wombourne connecting the village with the Merry Hill Centre, Wolverhampton and Stourbridge. Service 16A runs between Wolverhampton and Wombourne on late evenings and Sundays. Previously a service ran between Kidderminster and Wolverhampton via Kinver (580) along with infrequent services to Sedgley, Perton and a number of rural communities in South Staffordshire. However these were progressively withdrawn due to local authority funding cuts. Due to conditions imposed at the time of the planning application, a twice weekly free bus operated between the Sainsbury's store on the edge of the village and the village centre. This service is operated by Select Bus Services having originally been operated by Midland, although it now runs on Thursdays only. There used to be a railway line with a station serving the village although spelt instead as "Wombourn". The line and station closed to passenger services in 1932 and freight in the 1960s. It is now the South Staffordshire Railway Walk. The station survives as a cafe and the trackbed can be walked between Wolverhampton and Himley.

== Schools ==
The local secondary school is Wombourne High School.

== Sport ==
Wombourne V.C. was founded in 1995 and currently competes in the West Midlands Volleyball Association. The club has recently moved to train and compete at the brand new Evolve building near Dudley town centre. At the conclusion of the 2015 season the club was named "Volleyball England Club of the Year", topping competition from across England.

Wombourne has also been represented in Sunday league football by many different teams throughout the years. The most famous team is Orton Vale, established in 1977.

Wombourne also has two cricket teams: Wombourne Cricket Club and Beacon Cricket Club.

== Notable people ==
- William Reading (1674 in Swindon – 1744) an English clergyman and librarian of Sion College.
- Edward Simms (1800–1893) organist of Wombourne Parish Church (1813–1821)
- Ted Jarman (1907 in Wombourne – 2003) an English professional golfer, played in the 1935 Ryder Cup
- Pip Harris (1927 in Wombourne – 2013) a British motorcycle racer in the sidecar class over a 27-year career
- Robert King (born 1960 in Wombourne) is an English conductor, harpsichordist, editor and author, has concentrated on period performance of classical music in particular from the baroque and early modern periods
- Ian Painter (born 1964 in Wombourne) a footballer mainly for Stoke City, with 113 appearances
- Christopher Pincher (born 1969) a Conservative politician and MP for Tamworth (2010–2023), grew up in Wombourne
- Helene Hewitt (born 1972) a climate scientist, grew up in Wombourne
- Wendy Sadler (born 1972) a science communicator, grew up in Wombourne
- Mark Rhodes (born 1981) an English singer and television presenter, lives in Wolverhampton and socialises in Wombourne
- Lydia Thompson (born 1992) an English female rugby union player, went to Ounsdale High School in Wombourne
- Aaron Rai (born 1995) 2026 PGA Champion, was born in Wombourne

== See also ==
- Listed buildings in Wombourne
