= William Reading =

William Reading (1674–1744) was an English clergyman and librarian of Sion College, known for his edition of early church historians.

== Life ==
The son of a refiner of iron, he was born on 17 September 1674 at Swin in the parish of Wombourne, Staffordshire. He matriculated at University College, Oxford, on 1 June 1693, graduated B.A. in 1696–7, and proceeded M.A. at St. Mary Hall in 1703. On 15 November 1708 he was appointed, on the recommendation of Henry Compton, bishop of London, library keeper at Sion College. Legislation passed in 1710 on copyright made Sion College a deposit library.

He was lecturer at the church of St. Alphage between 1712 and 1723, and preached the sermon at Westminster Abbey on the anniversary of the execution of Charles I on 31 January 1714. He was made lecturer at St Michael, Crooked Lane, in 1725. He obtained a readership at Christ Church, London, in 1733.

Reading died on 10 December 1744. His son Thomas was granted on 28 January 1744 the places of ostiary, under librarian, and clerk assistant at Sion College.

== Works ==
In 1716 came out his ‘History of our Lord, adorn'd with cuts,’ London, of which a ‘second edition, to which is prefixed the Life of the B. Virgin Mary,’ was published in 1717. This work was reprinted at Leeds, 1849–50, 3 parts, edited by Walter Farquhar Hook.

Reading's major work was an edition in Greek and Latin of the early ecclesiastical historians: Eusebius Pamphilus, Socrates Scholasticus, Hermias Sozomenus, Theodoretus, and Evagrius Scholasticus. It was printed at the Cambridge University Press in 1720, in three folio volumes (reprinted at Turin, 1746–7). The text of Eusebius was republished at Venice, 1770, 3 vols. and again at Leipzig, 1827–8, under the care of Friedrich Adolph Heinichen.

In 1724 Reading printed ‘Twenty-three Sermons of Mortification, Holiness, and of the Fear and Love of God’ (London, for the author), dedicated to the archbishop of Canterbury; the writer complained that he was ‘always destitute of any ecclesiastical dignity or revenue.’ On 15 October of the same year he received the additional office of clerk or secretary of Sion College, possibly just after the publication of the compilation ‘Bibliothecæ Cleri Londinensis in Collegio Sionensi Catalogus, duplici forma concinnatus,’ of which the first part gives the titles arranged under subjects, and the second is an alphabetical index. Reading appended a history of the college. He printed in 1728 ‘Fifty-two Sermons for every Sunday of the Year,’ London, 2 vols., again dedicated to the archbishop of Canterbury. Two more volumes appeared in 1730, a second edition was printed in 1736, and a third edition, ‘One Hundred and Sixteen Sermons preached out of the First Lessons at Morning and Evening Prayer for all Sundays in the Year,’ London, 1755, 4 vols.

He published an edition of Origen ‘de Oratione, Gr. et Lat.’ (London, sumptibus editoris), in 1728, and a sermon on the act against profane swearing in 1731.

== Notes ==
Attribution

This article incorporates text from a publication now in the public domain: "Reading, William". Dictionary of National Biography. London: Smith, Elder & Co. 1885–1900.
