= Wombourne V.C. =

Volleyball club in West Midlands, England

Wombourne Volleyball Club is a volleyball club based in Dudley (and previously Wombourne) competing in the West Midlands Volleyball Association leagues, as well as Volleyball England's National Cup competition. It runs 5 teams (3 men's and 2 ladies) in the WMVA leagues, and 2 teams (1 men's and 1 ladies) in the National Cup Competition.

== History ==
Wombourne Volleyball Club was founded in 1993 by Bill Craig and competed in the Birmingham and District Volleyball League. Early successes included winning the B&D Cup in the 1995/96 and 1996/97 seasons.

Upon creation of the West Midlands Volleyball Association, it entered one men's team which competed in Division one. The club was successful in winning the league in the 2002/03 season and winning the cup competition in 2004/05 season. Plate competition success followed in 2005/06 and 2006/07 seasons, and again in the 2009/10 season.

For the start of the 2013/14 season the club merged with Coseley Volleyball Club, both teams deciding to keep the Wombourne Volleyball Club name but moving to the newly built venue of Dudley College's Evolve building. The merger allowed both clubs to pool resources under one name and grow the club to compete with 3 teams including Wombourne's first ladies team (Coseley had previously run ladies and men's teams). The season was a success with the men's first team winning promotion back to division one of the WMVA.

The club continued to grow and was able to field 5 teams in the 2014/15 season, adding a third men's team and second ladies team. The club was able to run several coaching and refereeing courses over the route of the season, up skilling not only Wombourne volunteers but also volunteers from across the WMVA. Wombourne also joined with fellow WMVA club Tamworth Spartans to enter a team in the National Cup competition for the first time, calling themselves the "South Staffordshire Sabres". The season was again a successful one, with the ladies first team winning promotion to division one and the men's second team winning promotion to division two (meaning that Wombourne now had a team in every division of the WMVA).

== Club of the Year ==
On top of the local success of the 2014/15 season, success also came on a national level as the club were voted Volleyball England's Sportset Club of the Year. The prestigious award recognizing a well run club, the work done in the local community promoting volleyball, as well as the successes on court.

== Present ==
For the 2015/16 season, Wombourne will enter the National Cup competition under its own name with both a men's and ladies team competing. This is in addition to the 5 teams it will enter in the WMVA.
