= Bratch =

Area of Wombourne, Staffordshire, England

Coordinates: 52.5415°N 2.1967°W

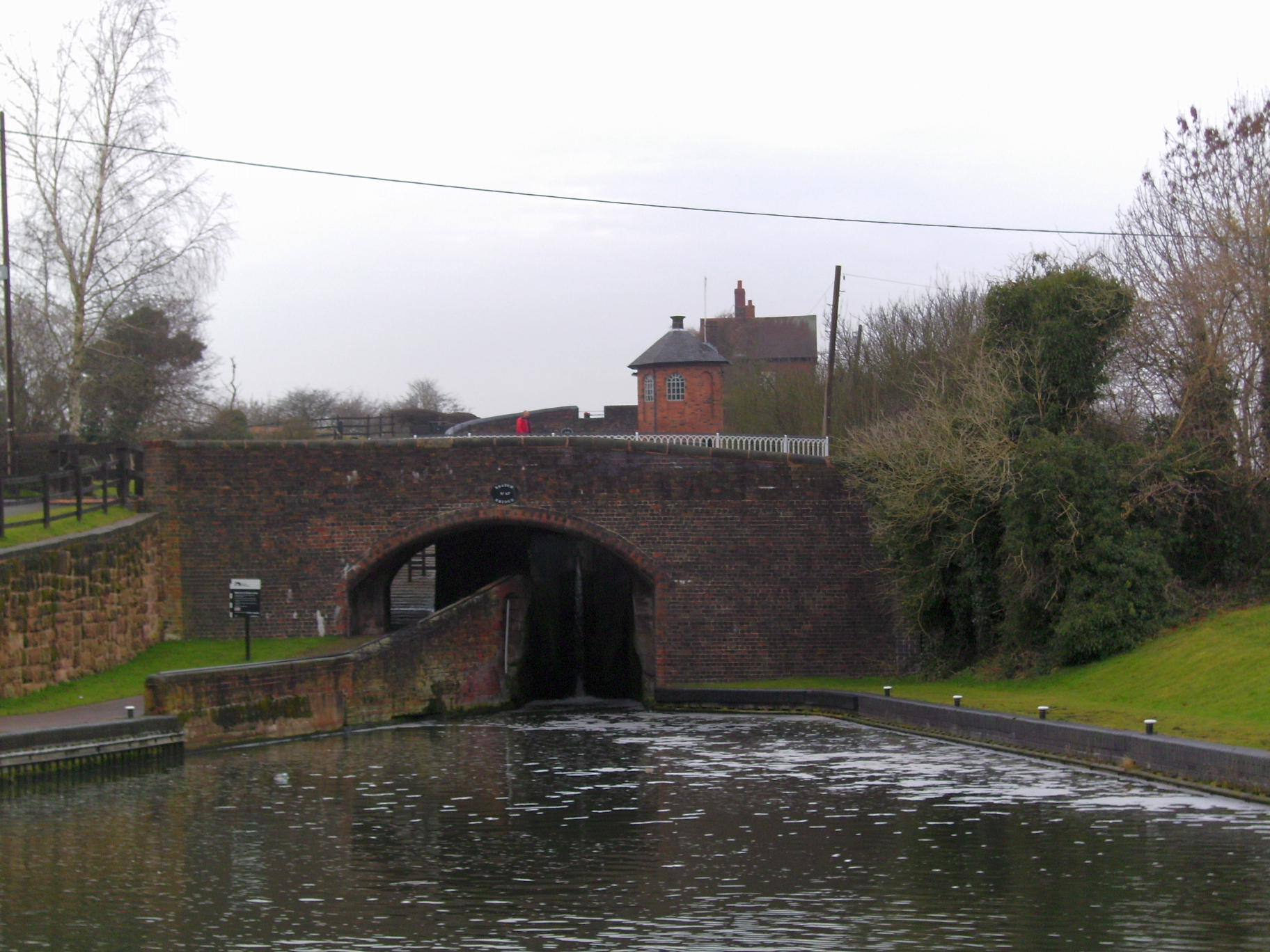
- The Bratch Bridge, seen from the canal

- Location within Staffordshire
- OS grid reference: SO867937
- District: South Staffordshire
- Shire county: Staffordshire
- Region: West Midlands
- Country: England
- Sovereign state: United Kingdom
- Post town: Wolverhampton
- Postcode district: WV5
- Dialling code: 01902
- Police: Staffordshire
- Fire: Staffordshire
- Ambulance: West Midlands
- UK Parliament: Kingswinford and South Staffordshire

The Bratch is an area of Wombourne in South Staffordshire, England, noted for its industrial heritage and more recently as a way station for walkers, riders and cyclists. Formerly, it was a small, separate hamlet, and became fully absorbed into Wombourne only in the 20th century. Population details for the 2011 census can be found under Wombourne.

== Etymology ==
The name is derived from the Anglian dialect of Old English, in which the word brēc signifies newly broken-in land. There are a number of Bratches in Staffordshire, e.g. near Enville and Norton Canes. In each case, they are near the edges of ancient forests, so a bratch was a new clearing in the waste.

== Bratch Locks ==
The Bratch Locks are a noted feature of the Staffordshire and Worcestershire Canal, planned by James Brindley, and opened in 1772 as a three lock staircase. They were later re-engineered as three separate locks. They are served by two bridges, a toll house, and a keeper's cottage. The whole forms a well-preserved example of vernacular Georgian architecture and design, built of mellow local brick.

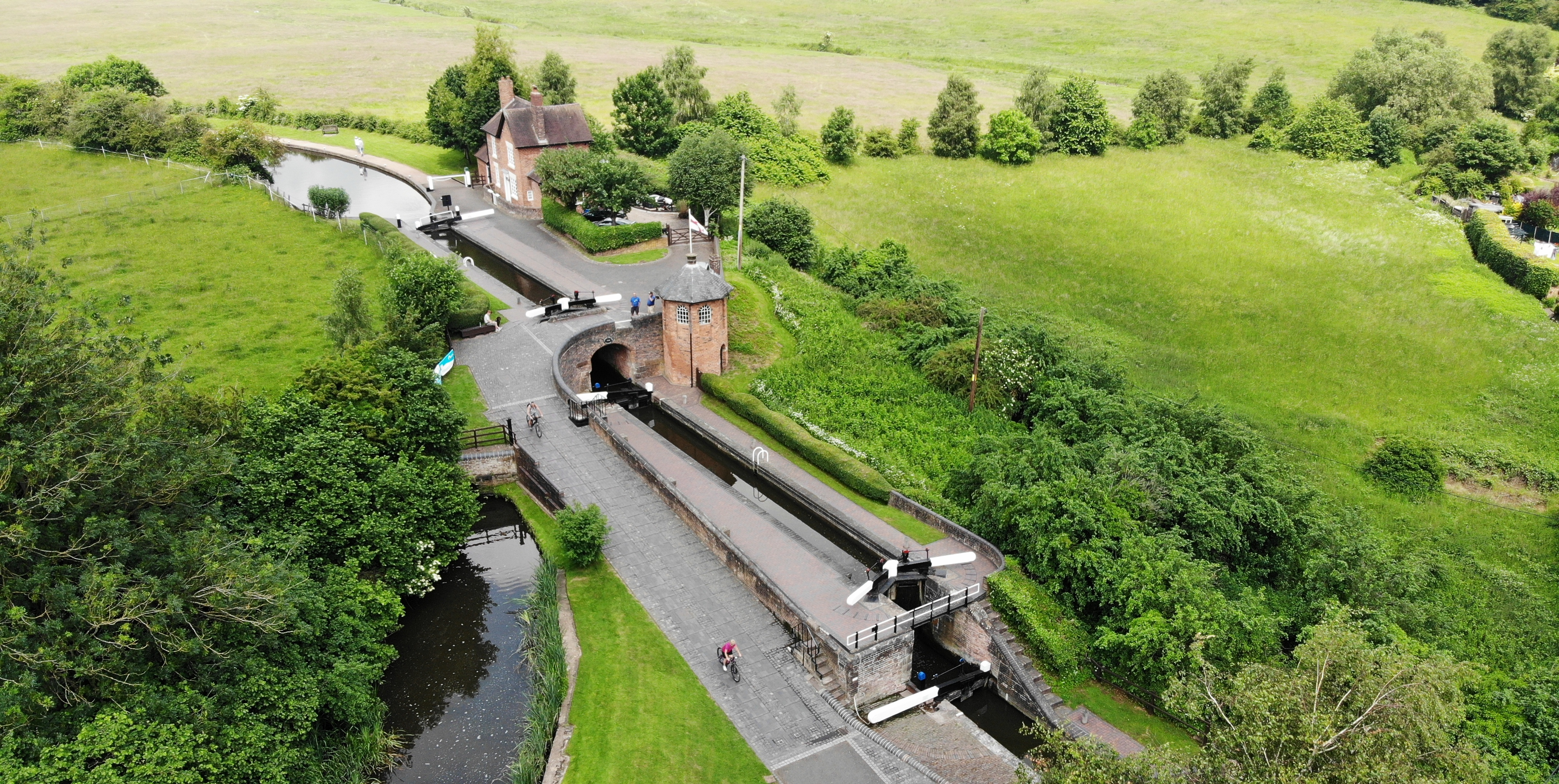
Bird's Eye View of Bratch Locks in Wombourne

== Bratch Pumping Station ==
A notable example of Victorian architecture and engineering, the Bratch Pumping Station was built in 1895. It was the result of a dispute over water pricing between Bilston Urban District Council and the Borough of Wolverhampton, which had supplied Bilston's water hitherto. Bilston's council decided to secure an independent water supply for the town. After some debate, it was decided to build a water works about seven miles from Bilston, at the Bratch.

The pumping station tower was built with ornate brickwork and extravagant pinnacles: it is clearly visible from the canal. Originally, there was also a tall, Italianate chimney stack, but this was demolished after the works became obsolete. Two steam engines pumped water from the underlying sandstone for more than six decades. They were generally used in turn, rather than simultaneously, and raised the water about 50 metres from the underlying Bunter sandstone. It was then pumped to a reservoir on the then border between Wolverhampton and Bilston, at Goldthorn Hill, about 100 metres higher.

The site is still used for water extraction by Severn Trent, although the pumping station became redundant in 1960. The building and one of the engines were restored from 1991. With the support of Severn Trent and Friends of the Bratch, Chief Engineer Len Crane and a local group of enthusiasts hold steamings at public holidays.

== The former Wombourn railway station ==
Wombourn railway station (the correct spelling, as the final 'e' became common only later) was located at the Bratch, about 200 metres from the locks. It served the Wombourne Branch Line of the Great Western Railway, which was built between 1913 and 1925. The line was never heavily used by passengers, and ceased to function as a peacetime passenger line as early as 1932, although it proved important for the transport of strategic materials and troops during World War II. After 1945, its decline continued and it was closed in 1965 as part of the Beeching cuts. The line runs roughly parallel to the canal and to the Smestow Brook. The former railway land has become the South Staffordshire Railway Walk Local Nature Reserve and the Smestow Valley Local Nature Reserve. The track bed has become a bridle path, giving walkers, cyclists and riders views of, and access to, a large area of Staffordshire countryside. The station, meanwhile, has become an information point and café. It has a car park for visitors, and the site is also the base for a number of community groups.

== Gallery ==
External videos
- Bratch pumping engines in operation (10 mins – showing close-ups of most compinents)

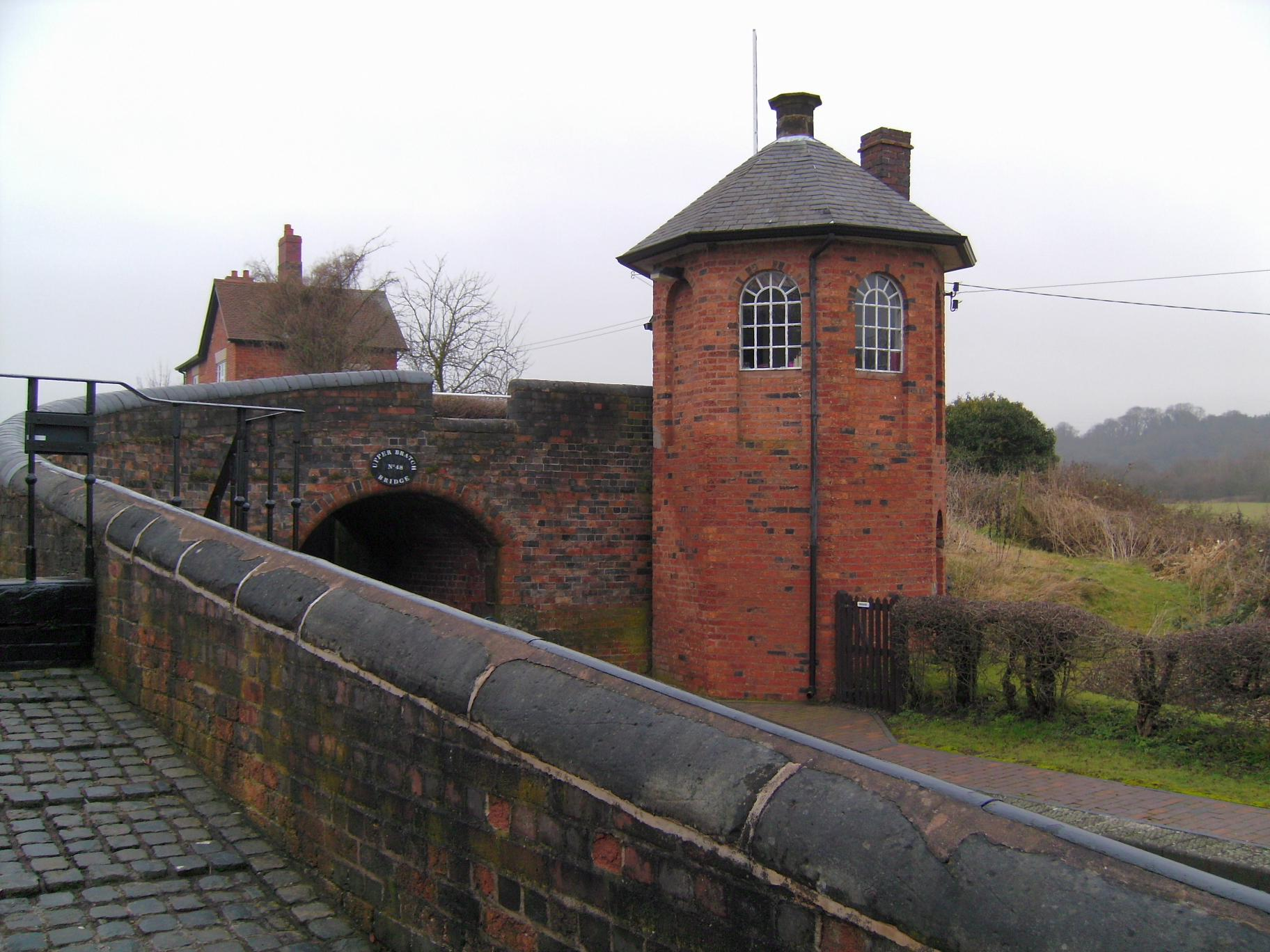
The Bratch Upper Bridge and toll house at the Bratch Locks.

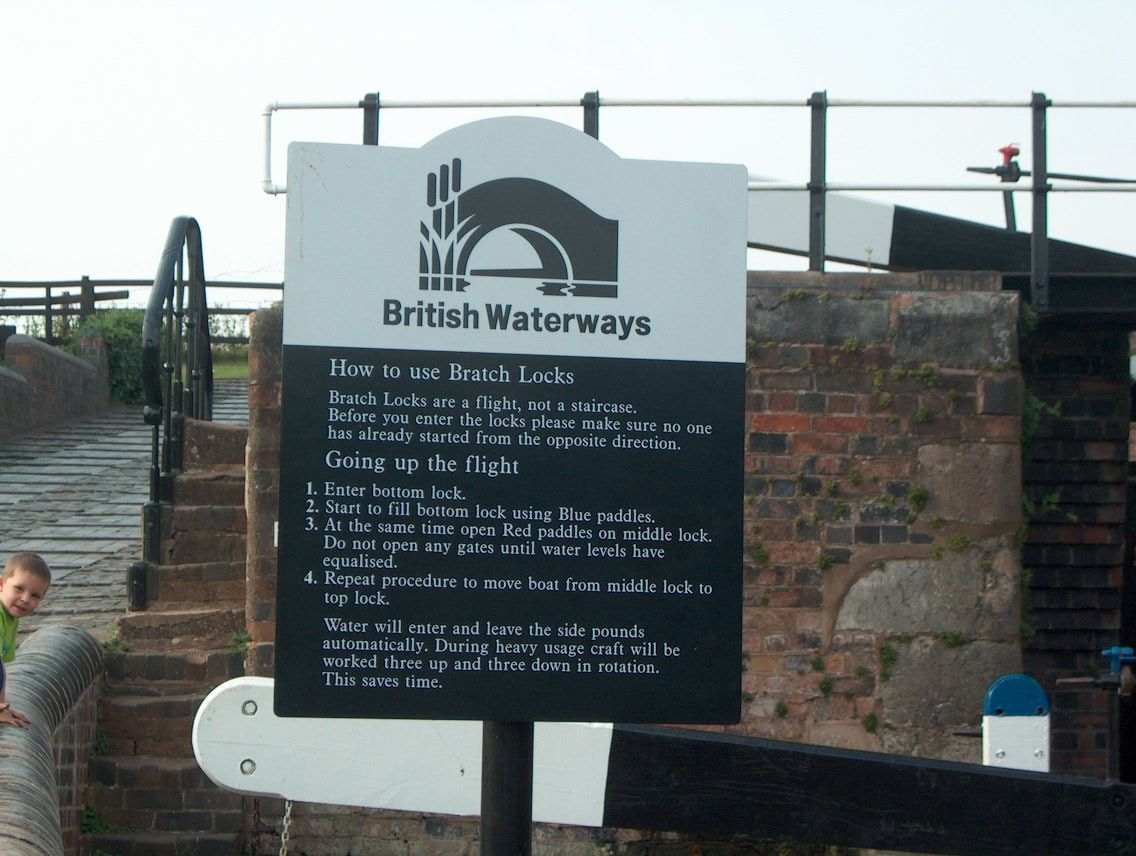
The flight of three locks presents a considerable challenge, and is very narrow in places. Each lock has a mitred pair of bottom gates and a single leaf top gate.

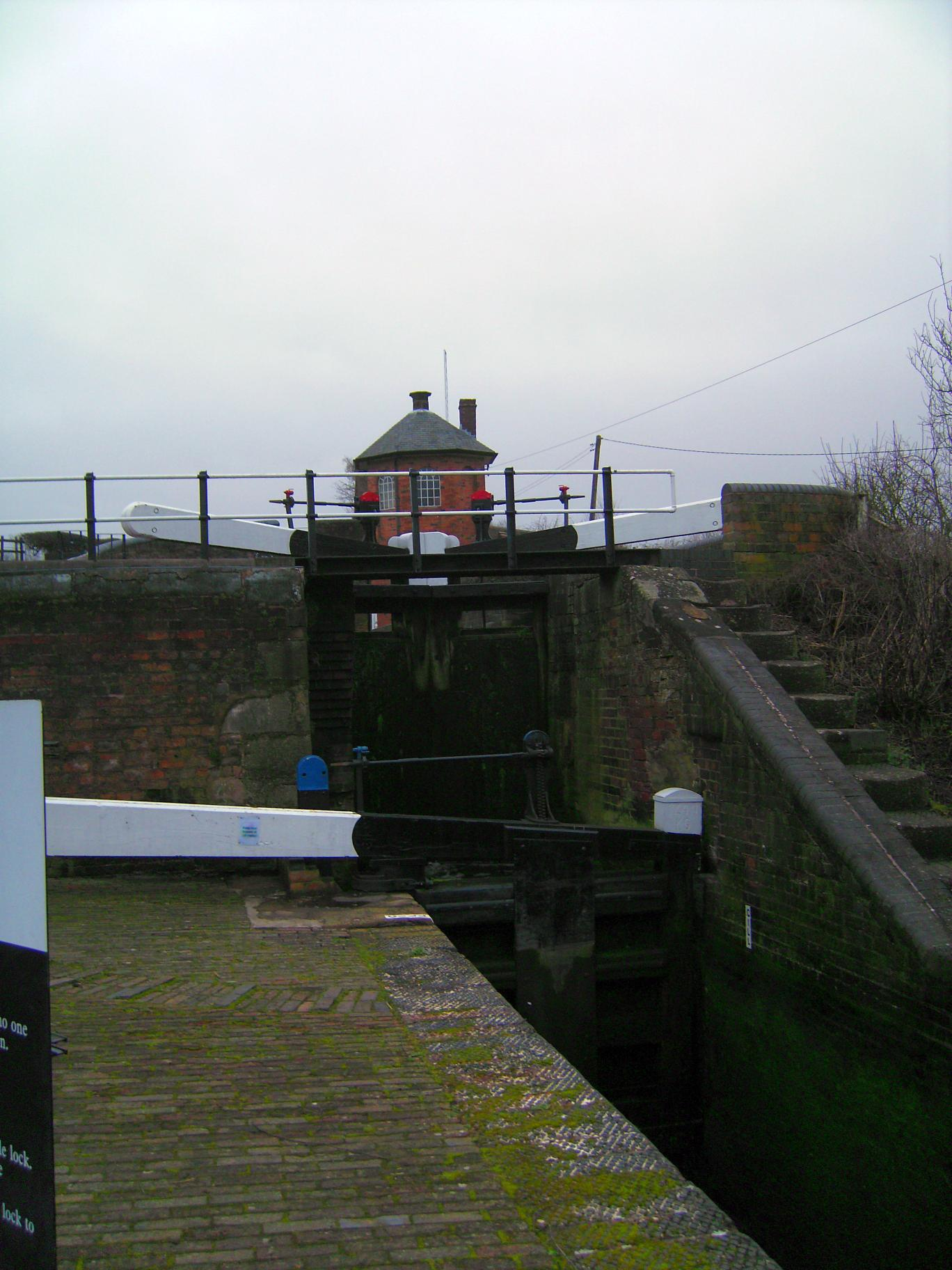
Upper locks and toll house.

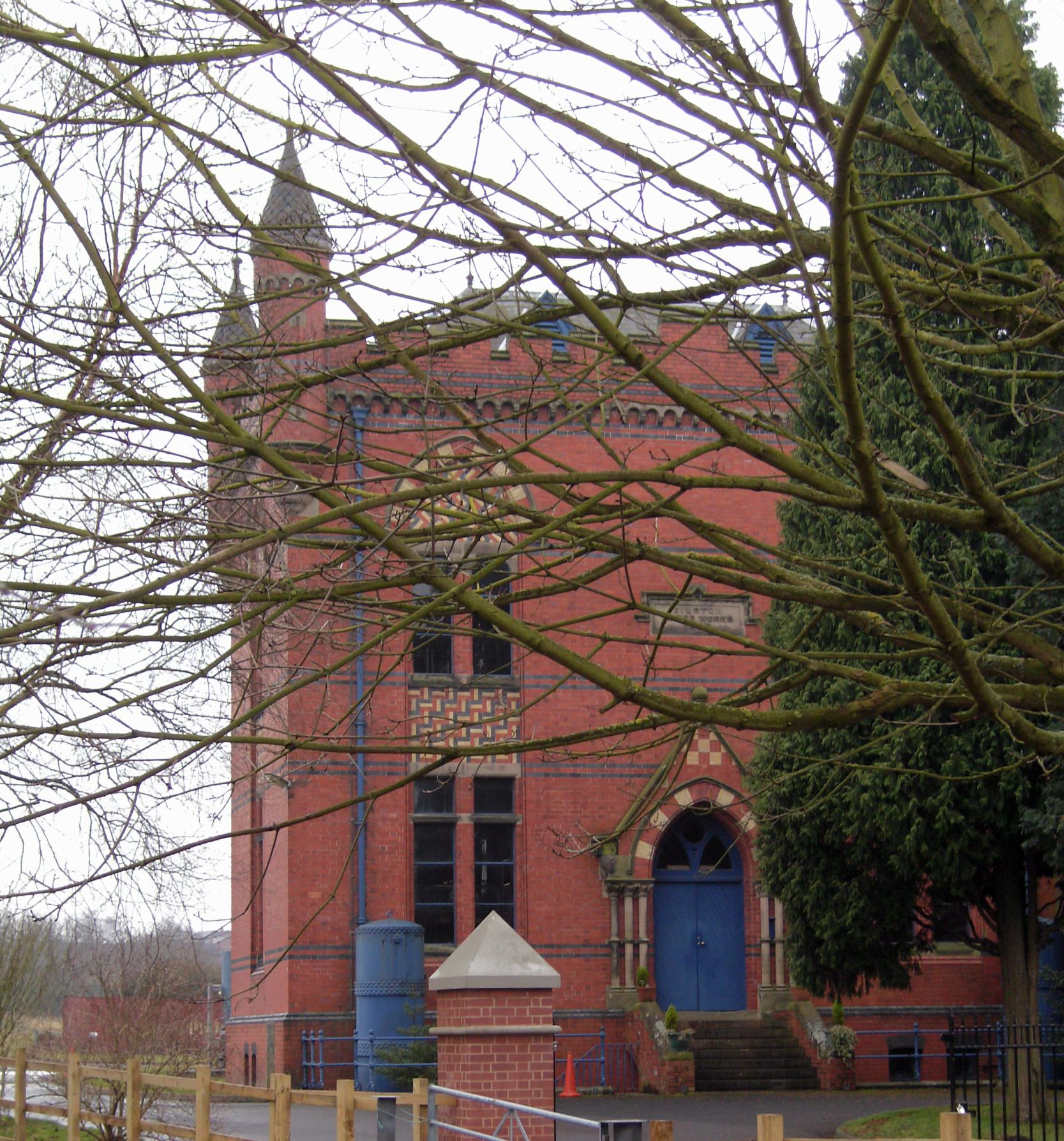
The pumping station from the north, showing ornate brickwork and pinnacles.

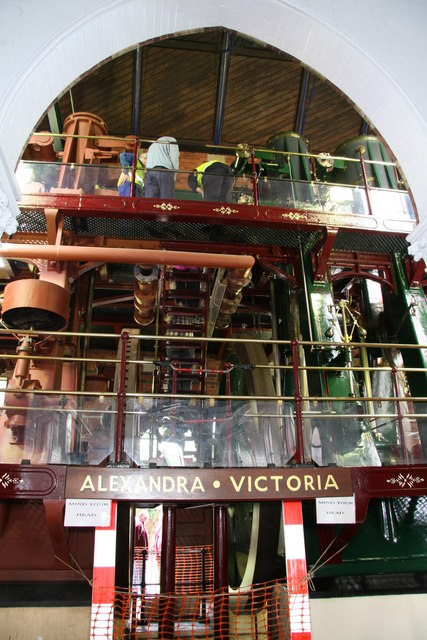
The pumping engines
