= Choir of Hereford Cathedral =

The Choir of Hereford Cathedral is an English Anglican choir based at Hereford Cathedral in Hereford. Geraint Bowen became organist and director of music at the cathedral in 2001.

== History ==
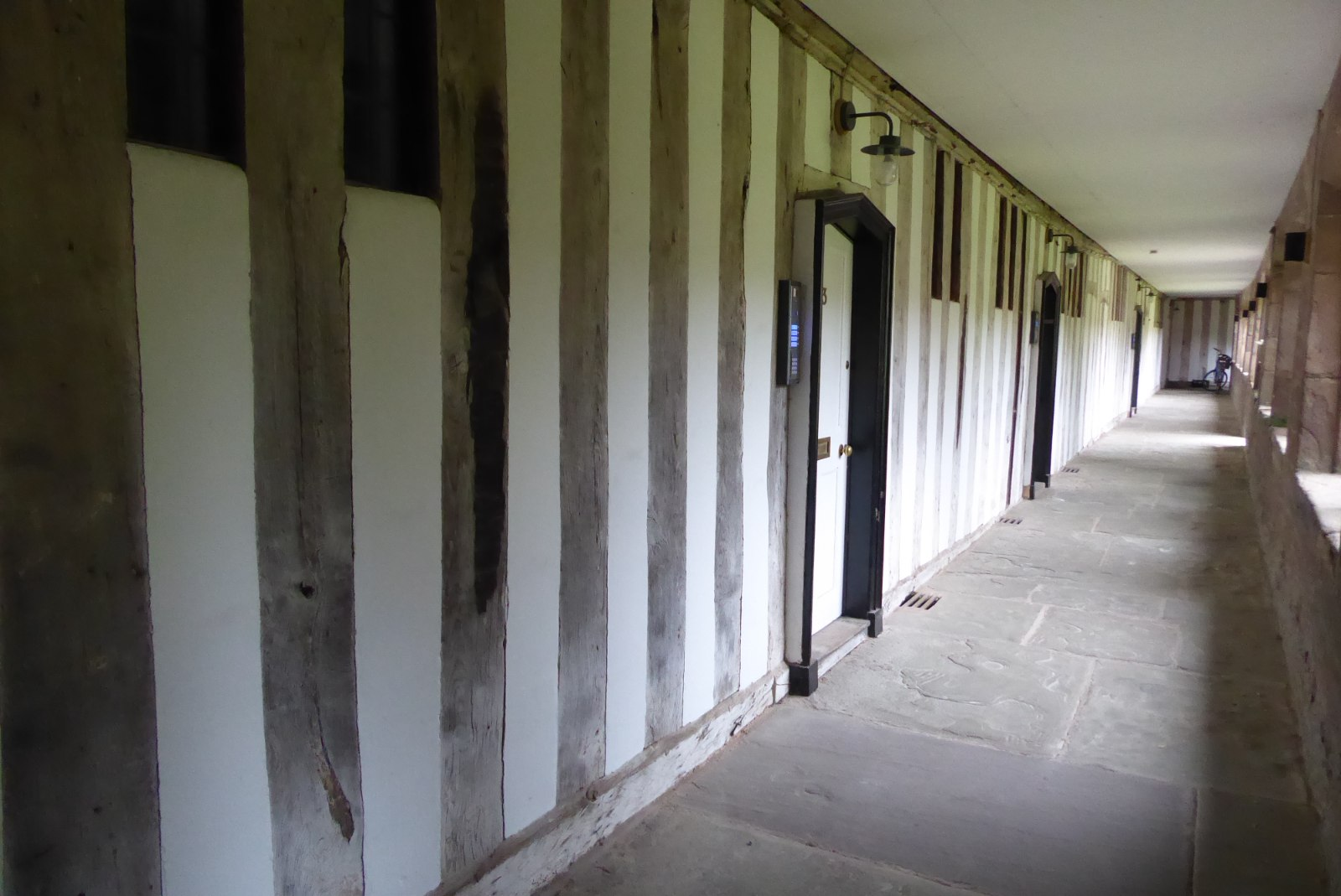
The College of Vicars Choral

As at other cathedrals that were not a monastic foundation, the adult members of the choir at Hereford were vicars choral. The number of these singers at Hereford appears to have been unusually large. The vicars choral at Hereford were incorporated as a college in 1395, at which time there were twenty-seven members. Their number was reduced to twelve, with an additional five lay members, in 1637. The college continued to provide singers for the choir until 1937, when the college was dissolved.

The buildings of the former college are preserved as a Grade I listed building. The singing tradition is maintained by the choristers (aged 7–13) along with the lay clerks and choral scholars (adult members who sing the alto, tenor and bass parts).

== Repertoire ==
=== Choral Evensong ===
Like other cathedral choirs in the United Kingdom, the choir takes part in BBC Radio 3’s weekly live broadcasts of Choral Evensong. It has performed works such as the "Magnificat in D major" by the Gloucestershire composer Herbert Brewer, and Allegri's Miserere (which has a connection with Hereford via Ivor Atkins who produced an English edition of the work).

=== Three Choirs Festival ===
The Three Choirs Festival is an annual music festival, which has been held since the 18th century, rotating among the cathedrals of the "Three Counties" (Hereford, Gloucester, and Worcester). Messiah was performed in Hereford for the first time in 1759.
