= Thomas Shaw-Hellier =

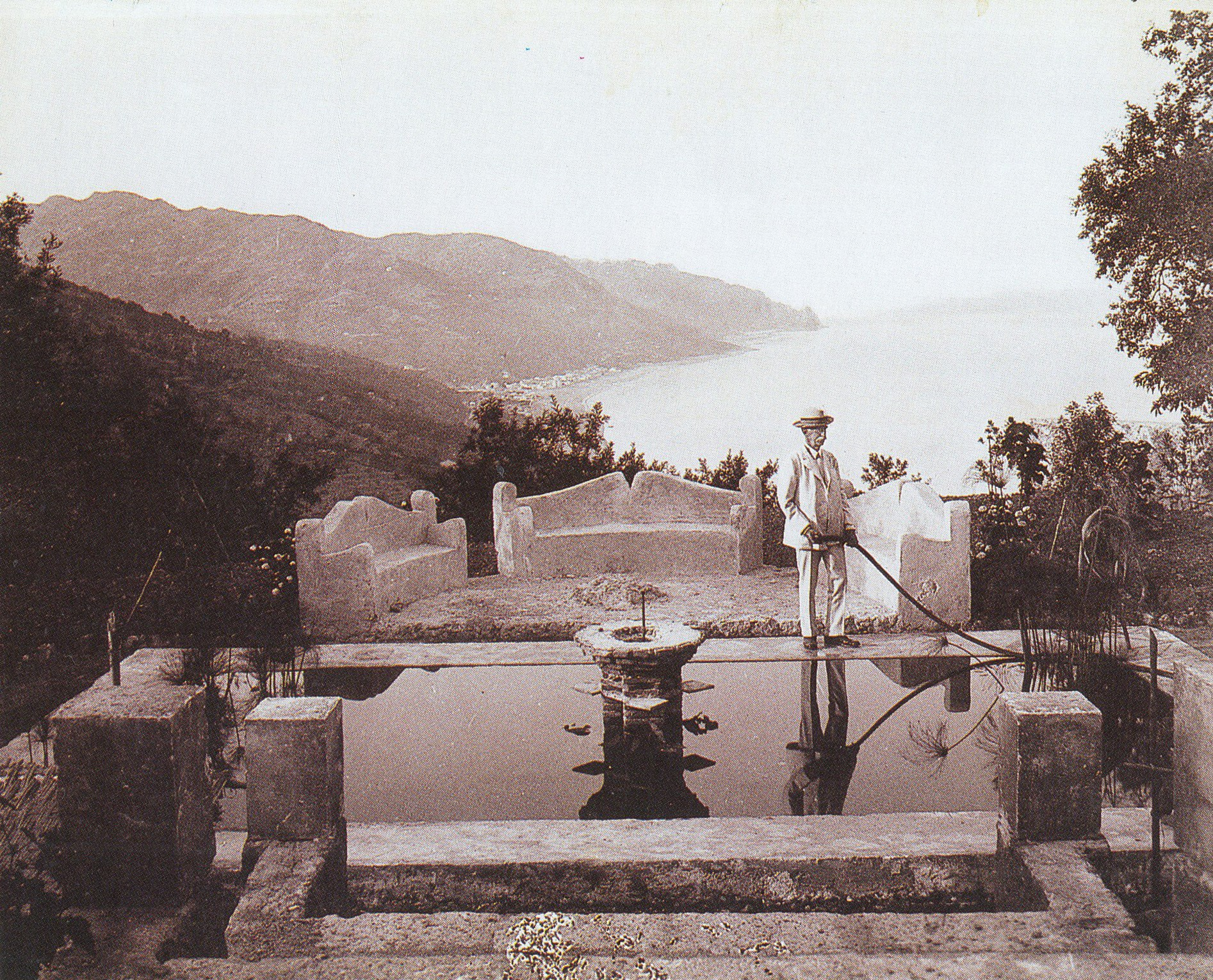
Colonel Thomas Bradney Shaw-Hellier watering his garden at Villa San Giorgio, Taormina, Sicily. Photo by his friend Wilhelm von Gloeden (1856-1931) of Taormina

Colonel Thomas Bradney Shaw-Hellier (1836–1910), 4th Royal Irish Dragoon Guards, of The Wodehouse near Wombourne, Staffordshire, and of Villa San Giorgio (now Hotel Ashby) in Taormina, Sicily, was Director of the Royal Military School of Music. He was a gentleman farmer, described as a leading breeder of Jersey cattle.

== Origins ==
The family seat is The Wodehouse, an ancient manor house in Staffordshire. The estate has passed down within the family, or has been bequeathed to friends, for many generations, and has not been for sale.

Thomas Shaw-Hellier was the grandson and direct heir of the Reverend Thomas Shaw, minister at St John's Church, Wolverhampton and perpetual curate of Claverley circa 1765–1810.

Reverend Thomas Shaw was the adoptive heir of Sir Samuel Hellier (1737-1784), High Sheriff of Worcestershire, the only son and heir of Samuel Hellier (died 1751), who had acquired The Wodehouse before the 1720s. Sir Samuel displayed a passion for eclectic knowledge with a substantial library and an important collection of musical instruments. A condition of inheritance was that the recipient should change his name to that of his benefactor, and in 1786 Reverend Shaw became Shaw-Hellier. He lived at the Wodehouse with his wife Mary, worked at St. John's Wolverhampton and at Tipton, and died in 1812.

His son James, manager of Netherton colliery, died in 1827; he had also been known to steward the races at nearby Penn Common.

The family continued its close ties with St. John's Wolverhampton; in addition to Sir Samuel's endowment and his successor's work there, in 1820 a daughter of the house, Parthenia, married the minister. Sons of the house went into the ministry, including several successive generations named Thomas.

=== Sir Samuel Hellier (1737-1784) ===
Sir Samuel Hellier (1737-1784) collected beautiful or unusual objects: a gold cane-handle depicting the intertwining of the emblems of several local families was bequeathed to the Ashmolean Museum. He spent a great deal of money on collecting a musical treasure trove of instruments and newly published works. He was particularly interested in Handel; indeed, the catalogue accompanying the National Portrait Gallery exhibition marking the tercentenary of the composer's birth calls Sir Samuel, and abolitionist Granville Sharp, two men of the late eighteenth century "who have left us solid evidence of the means by which they indulged their enthusiasm". He was also a "prominent figure at the Three Choirs Festival", one of the world's oldest classical choral music festivals.

Sir Samuel Hellier endowed both the ancient Church of Benedict Biscop, Wombourne and the new St John's Church, Wolverhampton, which opened in 1760. He provided an organ for his parish church, and his correspondence with this organist regarding playing techniques has recently been rediscovered, and is cited approvingly.

Sir Samuel's grandmother lived to be 99, and he survived not two years longer, dying in the autumn of 1784. He never married and left his property to his lifelong friend Rev. Thomas Shaw, minister at St John's Wolverhampton and perpetual curate of Claverley circa 1765–1810.

== Career ==
=== Country pursuits ===
He was a gentleman farmer, described as a leading breeder of Jersey cattle. For a period in the middle of the century Thomas Shaw-Hellier, being a keen huntsman, preferred the country seats of Packwood House and latterly Rodbaston Hall. He let The Wodehouse to tenants including Philip Stanhope, 1st Baron Weardale, the Liberal politician, pacifist, and philanthropist, and his wife Alexandra Tolstoy apparently lived for a time in the Wodehouse.

=== Musical career ===
He made a career in military music, spending several years as commandant of the Royal Military School of Music at Kneller Hall, where a prize for composition—a gold-mounted baton—was named in his honour. He was responsible for the Musical Division of the Royal Military Exhibition at Chelsea in 1890. Over the five-month exhibition, he brought 74 military bands from all over the country to perform by the River Thames. A large collection of musical instruments, particularly wind instruments, was displayed, and a catalogue was issued the following year under his direction. He was also a liveryman of the Worshipful Company of Musicians, donating a banner and co-organising the tercentenary celebrations at the beginning of the 20th century.

=== Military career ===
His military career saw him rise to command the 4th Royal Irish Dragoon Guards.

=== Patron of the Church ===
Like his predecessor, he supported the established church, in his case commemorating the quincentenary of Winchester College by endowing Winchester Cathedral with altar and fittings. He is listed in The Charitable Ten Thousand.

== Marriage ==
In the words of one local historian who has documented the gentry families of the area, "The whole inter-marrying and single child families came to a sterile conclusion in 1898 when Thomas Bradney Shaw-Hellier married Harriet Bradney Marsh Evans". They were distant cousins; he was over, and she was almost, 60 years old: they had no children. The marriage was characterised as "disastrous, wild, brief" and his response was to leave England and set himself a new project in Sicily.

== Life in Taormina, Sicily ==
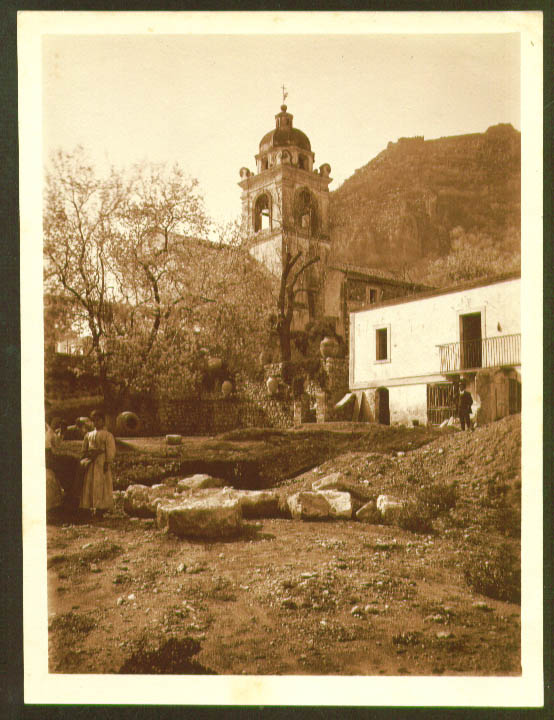
The partially built Villa San Giorgio, in 1907, beneath the church of San Pancrazio in Taormina. Photo by Wilhelm von Gloeden (1856-1931) of Taormina, dated 8 September 1912

Following the break-down of his marriage he moved to Sicily, then in its heyday for the British visitor, and settled in Taormina, a place welcoming to artists and homosexuals, and made more so by the artistic nude photographs of Wilhelm von Gloeden. One of his expat friends there was the homosexual artist Robert Hawthorn Kitson; another in his circle was the writer Robert Smythe Hichens.

In 1907 Shaw-Hellier commissioned Charles Robert Ashbee, a leader in the English Arts and Crafts Movement who in the late 1890s had made additions at The Wodehouse, such as a billiard room and a chapel, as well as many decorative external features. to build him a marble villa on a Taormina hilltop to rival Kitson's Casa Cuseni. He named it Villa San Giorgio, after the patron saint of England, and with a nod to John Ruskin's Guild of St George, which had been set up to re-value art and craftsmanship. (Shaw-Hellier asked John Beazley, later a world expert but then newly graduated from Oxford, to catalogue all the potsherds unearthed by the construction.) Fiona MacCarthy, the biographer of the architect, judges it "the most impressive of Ashbee's remaining buildings". It survives as the Hotel Ashbee.

MacCarthy also gives some insight into the life and spirit of the Colonelle inglese. Ashbee was gay or bisexual, and she thinks Shaw-Hellier may have been too. "Taormina was an obvious place for Colonel Shaw Hellier, retired soldier as he was with some artistic leanings, as susceptible as Ashbee - if not more so - to the glories of Sicilian boyhood, to choose to end his days". MacCarthy quotes a description by Ashbee of Shaw-Hellier's "bevy of Sicilian boy retainers...with large dreamy eyes". The Ashbees saw him as childlike, "perpetually young" and sprightly even in his 70s, enthusiastic, unpompous, devoted "to all the little simple helpful things of life", and erratic in his musical taste.

== Death and succession ==
When Shaw-Heller died in Sicily in 1910, the estate passed to his nephew Evelyn Simpson, who changed his name to Shaw-Hellier; his ancestors had owned a brewery in Baldock since the 1770s. On his death in 1922, the English estate passed to Evelyn's daughter Evelyn Mary Penelope Shaw-Hellier, his son having been killed in World War I. The two surviving Shaw-Hellier sisters lived in the Wodehouse (and possibly also in the Villa San Giorgio), maintaining their connections with the church and village (e.g. donating a substantial sum of money towards the building of a second church) and were described as "delightfully Edwardian [with] a taste for fast motoring". The last of the pair died in 1980, and the Wodehouse—still without being sold—passed to distant relatives, the Phillips, who live there privately, occasionally opening the house and grounds to the public.
