= The Wodehouse =

Small country house in Staffordshire, England

Coordinates: 52.5396°N 2.1704°W

The Wodehouse is a Grade II* listed English country house near Wombourne, Staffordshire, notable as the family seat of the Georgian landscape designer and musicologist Sir Samuel Hellier and, a century later, Colonel Thomas Bradney Shaw-Hellier, director of the Royal Military School of Music. For almost 200 years the family owned the Hellier Stradivarius.

It is claimed that the Wodehouse has not been sold for over 900 years, though more than once the family has died out.

== House, garden, and estate ==
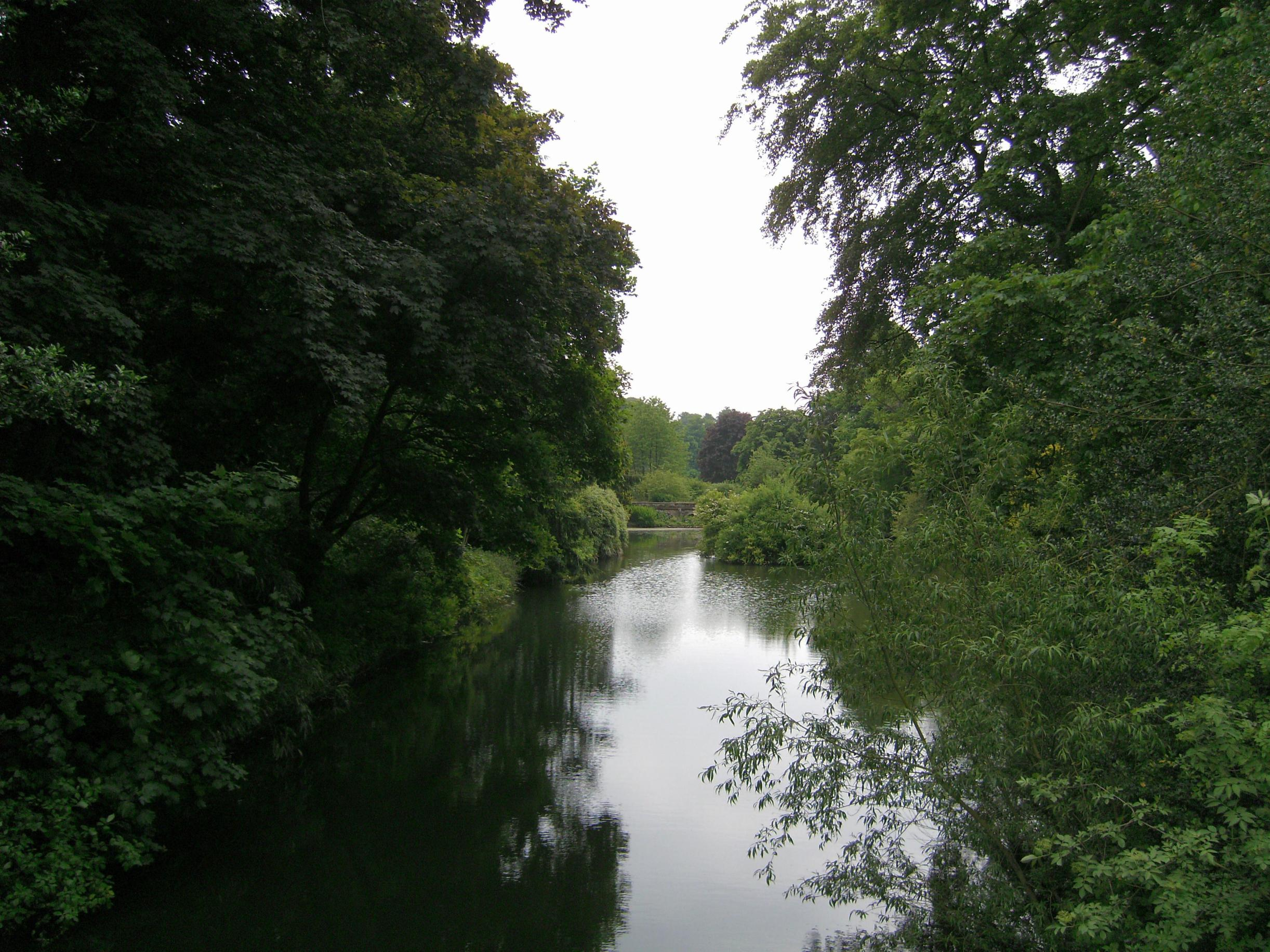
The south pool of the Wom Brook, in the grounds of the Wodehouse

The Wodehouse is situated on the Wom Brook, to the east of the village, and the estate has existed since medieval times. The manor house itself was listed by English Heritage in 1953 as Grade II*, as were the stable block and coach house in 1963. The early-eighteenth-century Wodehouse farmhouse and mill, across the road from the main house, were grade II* listed in 1973. In 1987, the barn, the dam over the mill pool, and the causeway over its other end all received grade II status.

In the middle of the 18th century, the Wodehouse was turned into a centre of culture. The 18 acres (73,000 m^{2}) of grounds were laid out in fashionable style:

The Wodehouse [...] became in the later 18th century, an early Alton Towers, the resort both of 'people of consequence' and of 'tag, rag and rabble' for here, in 1763, Sir Samuel Hellier laid out a pleasure garden which, besides having all the usual decorative features of gardens of the time, temples, grottoes, a root house, a druid’s circle, also had a music room with working organ, a hermitage with life-sized model of a hermit and boards set up along the paths with appropriate verses to enlighten visitors. The whole garden was a clearly a caricature of the finest achievements in 18th-century gardening.

Some of this, such as Handel's temple, was the first commission of James Gandon after leaving the studios of Sir William Chambers. A series of drawings of the garden features are all that survive. The Shaw Helliers and some of their properties are mentioned in the 1820 Survey of Staffordshire, but, curiously, not the Wodehouse itself. Samuel Lewis in the 1848 edition of A Topographical Dictionary of England describes the property as "a noble mansion in the Elizabethan style, situated in a beautiful vale".

The house has a fourteenth century core, with seventeenth-century additions and eighteenth-century internal refittings. It was restored by George Frederick Bodley, the Gothic revival architect, in the 1870s. A generation later, in the late 1890s, Charles Robert Ashbee, a leader in the English Arts and Crafts Movement, made additions such as a billiard room and a chapel, as well as many decorative external features. In 1912, just after the estate changed hands, the Wolverhampton architect J.K.H.E. Lavender was engaged. The gardens continued to be opened to the public on certain occasions; for example, in 1936 the Wodehouse joined the National Gardens Scheme, and as recently as in 2011 hosted the AGM of the Staffordshire Gardens and Parks Trust.

In 1984, the Victoria County History volume for south-west Staffordshire called the Wodehouse one of the "three great houses" of the area, along with Enville Hall. At the turn of the 21st century, Michael Raven describes the Wodehouse as "unspoilt", with the house having "a certain serene and mysterious charm" and the property overall "the classic configuration of an early medieval settlement".

== Inhabitants ==
=== 18th century: Sir Samuel Hellier ===
The Wodehouse was acquired by Samuel Hellier by the 1720s. He was Oxford educated, and evidently, through his collections, open to new and foreign ideas. He was someone who first had a passion for eclectic knowledge and had already accumulated a substantial library and the core of an important collection of musical instruments. He died in 1751. His only son and heir, who bore the same name, was 14 and an orphan, his mother having predeceased his father. One of the boy's more sympathetic guardians was Charles Lyttelton, Dean of Exeter, who encouraged him to study at Exeter College, Oxford. As a young man, he wrote of his longing to marry, but never did so, blaming in part his finances. His maternal grandmother, Sarah Huntbach of Seawall, a dowager heiress, controlled the Featherstone part of his estate.

Despite these constraints, he managed to redesign the Wodehouse's expansive gardens, as described above. He became High Sheriff of Worcestershire for 1762-1763, a position now largely ceremonial but then the principal law enforcement officer of the county, and was knighted in 1762. In addition to the items for which he was famous, he collected beautiful or unusual objects: a gold cane-handle depicting the intertwining of the emblems of several local families was bequeathed to the Ashmolean Museum.

Sir Samuel spent a great deal of money on collecting a musical treasure trove of instruments and newly published works. He was particularly interested in Handel; indeed, the catalogue accompanying the National Portrait Gallery exhibition marking the tercentenary of the composer's birth calls Sir Samuel, and abolitionist Granville Sharp, two men of the late eighteenth century "who have left us solid evidence of the means by which they indulged their enthusiasm". He was also a "prominent figure at the Three Choirs Festival", one of the world's oldest classical choral music festivals.

For centuries the families at the Wodehouse, as was usual for the squirearchy, were closely connected with the Church of England in general and the village church in particular, which holds several memorials to them. Sir Samuel endowed both the ancient parish church of St Benedict Biscop in Wombourne and the new St John's Church, Wolverhampton, which opened in 1760. He provided an organ for his parish church, and his correspondence with this organist regarding playing techniques has recently been rediscovered, and is cited approvingly.

Sir Samuel's grandmother lived to be 99, and he survived not two years longer, dying in the autumn of 1784. He never married and left his property to his lifelong friend Thomas Shaw, minister at St John's Wolverhampton and perpetual curate of Claverley circa 1765–1810. A condition of inheritance was that the recipient change his name to that of his benefactor, and in 1786 Reverend Shaw became Shaw-Hellier. He lived at the Wodehouse with his wife Mary, worked at St. John's Wolverhampton and at Tipton, and died in 1812. His son James, manager of Netherton colliery, died in 1827; he had also been known to steward the races at nearby Penn Common. The family continued its close ties with St. John's Wolverhampton; in addition to Sir Samuel's endowment and his successor's work there, in 1820 a daughter of the house, Parthenia, married the minister. Sons of the house went into the ministry, including several successive generations named Thomas.

=== 19th century: Colonel T. B. Shaw-Hellier ===
For a period in the middle of the century Thomas Shaw-Hellier, the grandson and direct heir of the Reverend Thomas Shaw, rented out the property. Being a keen huntsman, he preferred the country seats of Packwood House and latterly Rodbaston Hall. In his absence, Philip Stanhope, 1st Baron Weardale, the Liberal politician, pacifist, and philanthropist, and his wife Alexandra Tolstoy apparently lived for a time in the Wodehouse. Stanhope was elected to Parliament in 1886, sitting first for nearby Wednesbury. One of their houseguests at the Wodehouse was William Ewart Gladstone.

The second historically significant musical person from the Wodehouse is Colonel Thomas Bradney Shaw-Hellier (1836–1910). He made a career in military music, spending several years as commandant of the Royal Military School of Music at Kneller Hall, where a prize for composition—a gold-mounted baton—was named in his honour. He was responsible for the Musical Division of the Royal Military Exhibition at Chelsea in 1890. Over the five-month exhibition, he brought 74 military bands from all over the country to perform by the River Thames. A large collection of musical instruments, particularly wind instruments, was displayed, and a catalogue was issued the following year under his direction. He was also a liveryman of the Worshipful Company of Musicians, donating a banner and co-organising the tercentenary celebrations at the beginning of the 20th century. His military career saw him rise to command the 4th Royal Irish Dragoon Guards.

He was a gentleman farmer, described as a leading breeder of Jersey cattle. Like his predecessor, he supported the established church, in his case commemorating the quincentenary of Winchester College by endowing the Cathedral with altar and fittings. He is listed in The Charitable Ten Thousand.

=== 20th and 21st centuries ===
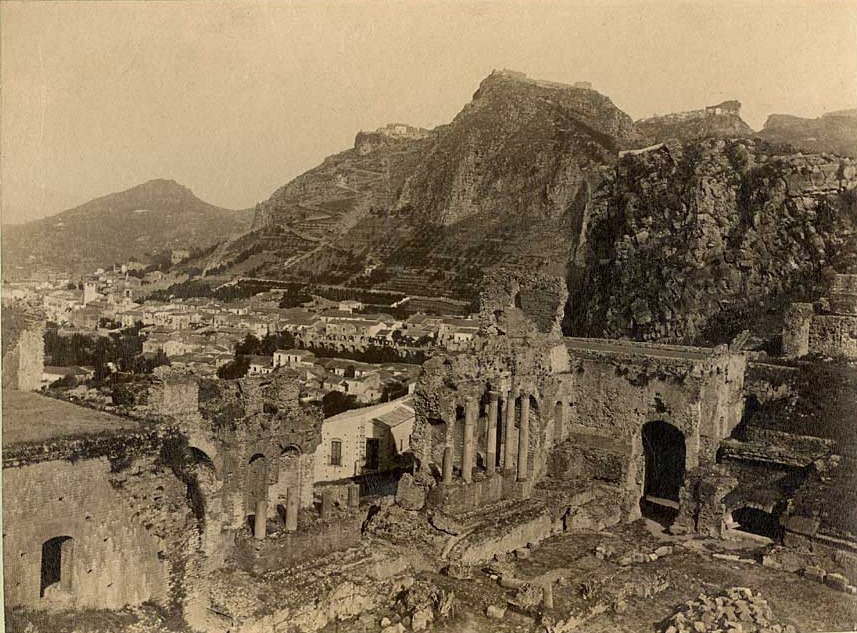
The Greek Theatre in Taormina, by Wilhem von Gloeden

In the words of one local historian who has documented the gentry families of the area, "The whole inter-marrying and single child families came to a sterile conclusion in 1898 when Thomas Bradney Shaw-Hellier married Harriet Bradney Marsh Evans". They were distant cousins; he was over, and she was almost, 60 years old: they had no children. The marriage was characterised as "disastrous, wild, brief" and his response was to leave England and set himself a new project. He moved to Sicily, then in its heyday for the British visitor, and settled in Taormina, a place welcoming to artists and homosexuals, and made more so by the artistic nude photographs of Wilhelm von Gloeden. One of his expat friends there was the artist Robert Hawthorn Kitson; another in his circle was the writer Robert Smythe Hichens. In 1907 Shaw-Hellier commissioned Ashbee, who had renovated the Wodehouse a decade before, to build him a marble villa on the hilltop to rival Kitson's Casa Cuseni. They named it Villa San Giorgio, after the patron saint of England, and with a nod to John Ruskin's Guild of St George, which had been set up to re-value art and craftsmanship. (Shaw-Hellier asked John Beazley, later a world expert but then newly graduated from Oxford, to catalogue all the potsherds unearthed by the construction.) Fiona MacCarthy, the biographer of the architect, judges it "the most impressive of Ashbee's remaining buildings". It survives as the Hotel Ashbee.

McCarthy also gives some insight into the life and spirit of the Colonelle inglese. Ashbee was gay or bisexual, and she thinks Shaw-Hellier may have been too. The Ashbees saw him as childlike, "perpetually young" and sprightly even in his 70s, enthusiastic, unpompous, devoted "to all the little simple helpful things of life", and erratic in his musical taste. He died in Sicily in 1910.

The estate passed to his nephew Evelyn Simpson, who changed his name to Shaw-Hellier; his ancestors had owned a brewery in Baldock since the 1770s. On his death in 1922, the estate passed to Evelyn's daughter Evelyn Mary Penelope Shaw-Hellier, his son having been killed in World War I. The two surviving Shaw-Hellier sisters lived in the Wodehouse (and possibly also in the Villa San Giorgio), maintaining their connections with the church and village (e.g. donating a substantial sum of money towards the building of a second church) and were described as "delightfully Edwardian [with] a taste for fast motoring". The last of the pair died in 1980, and the Wodehouse—still without being sold—passed to distant relatives, the Phillips, who live there privately, occasionally opening the house and grounds to the public. The Wodehouse still holds a significant collection of 18th century drinking glasses, as well as portraits and porcelain.

There is a Shaw Hellier Avenue named after the family, in the nearby Brierley Hill.

== Musical legacy ==
The musical collection is most closely associated with Sir Samuel Hellier, but the most valuable item within it preceded him, and those who came after him maintained or added to the printed works and instruments. The Hellier Stradivarius of circa 1679 is a violin made by Antonio Stradivari of Cremona, Italy. Cozio, an instrument authentication business, states that it was in the possession of Sir Edward Hellier in 1734, so it is possible that the Englishman bought it directly from the elderly luthier himself, perhaps during a grand tour. It was kept by the family for almost two hundred years. In 1880, it was sold by Colonel Shaw-Hellier, but he repurchased it ten years later. Upon his death in 1910, it passed out of the family. It is now in the care of the Stradivari Foundation in Cremona, where it is on display at the Museo del violino.

The Galpin Society rediscovered the treasure trove in a room in the stableblock in the 1960s. A researcher who did some of the cataloguing the following decade states that it was rare to find a collection in which both instruments and books survive, but the collection was split up soon afterwards. The instruments went to the Edinburgh University Collection of Historic Musical Instruments. A single one that was chosen or commissioned by Sir Samuel Hellier—in this case a trumpet—has been described in half a dozen journals and catalogues. The other half of the collection, the written works, went to the music library of the Barber Institute of Fine Arts at the University of Birmingham, where its 860 items were fully documented by Ian Ledsham in 1999. This includes rare copies of musical works, such as the Ten Voluntaries by John Bennett. In addition, and still at the Wodehouse, is a series of 165 letters Sir Samuel wrote to his estate manager, specifying how instruments were to be played and stored, a boon for the music historian.

Non-musical gifts were made to museums as well. For example, a model of a 64-gun ship with rigging, made in the late 18th century, was donated to the Pitt Rivers Museum in the late 19th.

== See also ==
- Donington le Heath Manor House Museum, contemporary to the Wodehouse
- List of country houses in the United Kingdom
- Grade II* listed buildings in South Staffordshire
- Listed buildings in Wombourne
