= St Benedict Biscop Church, Wombourne =

Parish church in Staffordshire, England

- Church of St Benedict Biscop
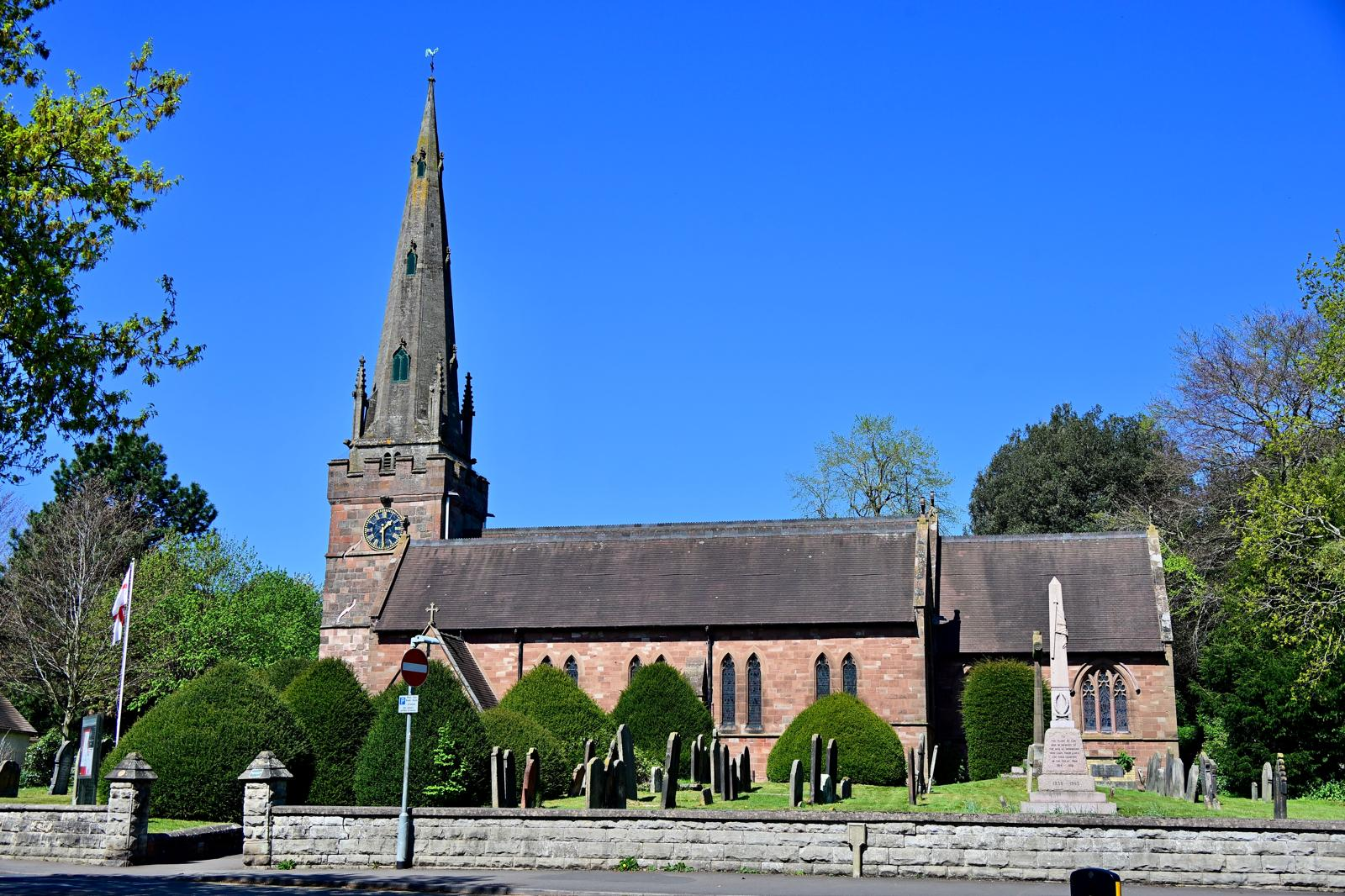
- St Benedict Biscop Church, Wombourne
- 52.536349°N 2.183246°W
- OS grid reference: SO 87672 93179
- Country: England
- Denomination: Church of England

History
- Status: Active
- Consecrated: 1867

Architecture
- Functional status: Parish church
- Heritage designation: Grade II listed
- Designated: 27 June 1963
- Architect: George Edmund Street
- Architectural type: Gothic Revival
- Years built: 1866 - 1867

Administration
- Diocese: Diocese of Lichfield
- Archdeaconry: Archdeaconry of Walsall
- Deanery: Trysull
- Parish: St Benedict Biscop, Wombourne

Clergy
- Vicar: Rev. Preb. Julia Cody

St Benedict Biscop Church is a parish church in Wombourne, Staffordshire. It is part of the Anglican Smestow Vale team ministry comprising the parishes of Wombourne, Trysull, Swindon, Himley and Bobbington, in the Diocese of Lichfield.

The dedication to St Benedict Biscop, 7th century founder of Monkwearmouth-Jarrow Abbey in Northumbria, is unique in England. The church is a grade II listed building designed by George Edmund Street in Gothic Revival style and constructed 1866 - 1867.

== History ==
A settlement at Wombourne is recorded in the Domesday Book of 1086 and there has certainly been a church on the site for more than 1,000 years. Its foundation may have been linked to the Battle of Tettenhall fought on 5 August 910, during which the allied Anglo-Saxon forces of Mercia and Wessex defeated an army of Northumbrian Vikings. If so, the intention would have been to provide a site to pray for the souls of the dead. The precise location of the battlefield remains a mystery, indeed it is sometimes referred to as the Battle of Wednesfield. 18th century antiquary Richard Wilkes postulated that Wombourne itself had been the site of the battle, though with little evidence his theory is widely discredited.

Nothing remains of the church's pre-Conquest structure, which would most likely have been made from wood. William White's 1834 History, Gazetteer, and Directory of Staffordshire suggested that the church was (re)built by the Priors of Dudley around 1170. While it is possible that some 12th-century fabric survived into the 19th century, today the oldest extant part of the church is the medieval west tower, which dates to the 14th century, and corresponding spire added sometime during the subsequent two centuries.

The industrial expansion of the Black Country from the mid-18th century bought rapid population growth to the village, when Wombourne became a centre of the local nail-making industry. By the early 19th century the small medieval church was deemed insufficient for the expanding number of parishioners and in 1839 a decision was taken to rebuild. The medieval building would however be recorded in a drawing by Thomas Peploe Wood in 1837, shortly before demolition, now in the collection of the William Salt Library in Stafford.

The new church was commissioned from local architect Robert Ebbels of Trysull, whose design made use of the briefly fashionable Strawberry Hill Gothic style, retaining the medieval tower and spire. His hand-drawn ground plan for the new church is preserved in the archive of the Incorporated Church Building Society, now kept at Lambeth Palace Library. The church, now capable of seating 260, reopened on 23 May 1841 with a ceremony presided over by Thomas Legh Claughton, the newly appointed vicar of Kidderminster. A sepia drawing of Ebbels' church, drawn by John Buckler in 1845, is also held at the William Salt Library.

However, within 20 years the new building would be deemed unsightly and uncomfortable by vicar William Heale, who held the incumbency in Wombourne from 1848 to 1897. Heale engaged the famous London-based architectural practice of George Edmund Street to replace what - in ecclesiastical terms - was still a brand new building in order to erect a larger replacement in a more academic Gothic Revival style. Heale had two purposes in mind, to restore the 'antique beauties' of St Benedict Biscop, and the provision of increased seating capacity.

Building work, including the strengthening and repair of the medieval tower and spire, was contracted to Messrs. G. and F. Higham of Castle Street, Wolverhampton. Work began in 1866 and was completed the following year, with a new seating capacity of 500, at a total cost of £3,500. Landed proprietors and a few parishioners had subscribed nearly £2,000, while the parish obtained a loan of £700 from the Public Loan Commissioners, repayable over 15 years. A grant of £40 was obtained from the Lichfield Diocesan Church Building Society, and £800 was left to be raised by other means - £172 of which was donated by the congregation attending the consecration ceremony.

The service of consecration took place on 20 August 1867. Re-consecration of St Benedict Biscop had been deemed necessary by John Lonsdale, Bishop of Lichfield as the chancel of the enlarged church was built on new ground. However, unable to preside over the service himself, Lonsdale invited Claughton, who had only recently been appointed Bishop of Rochester after 26 years as vicar in Kidderminster, to officiate. Claughton noted in his sermon the unusual circumstances of twice presiding over the reopening of the same rebuilt church.

In 1888 a new clock was installed in the tower in commemoration of the Golden Jubilee of Queen Victoria the previous year. It is equipped with two dials to the south and west faces of the tower and has a full set of Westminster chimes.

To accommodate Wombourne's expanding population, in 1957 a modern sister church dedicated to the Venerable Bede was built on the other side of the village.

== Architecture ==
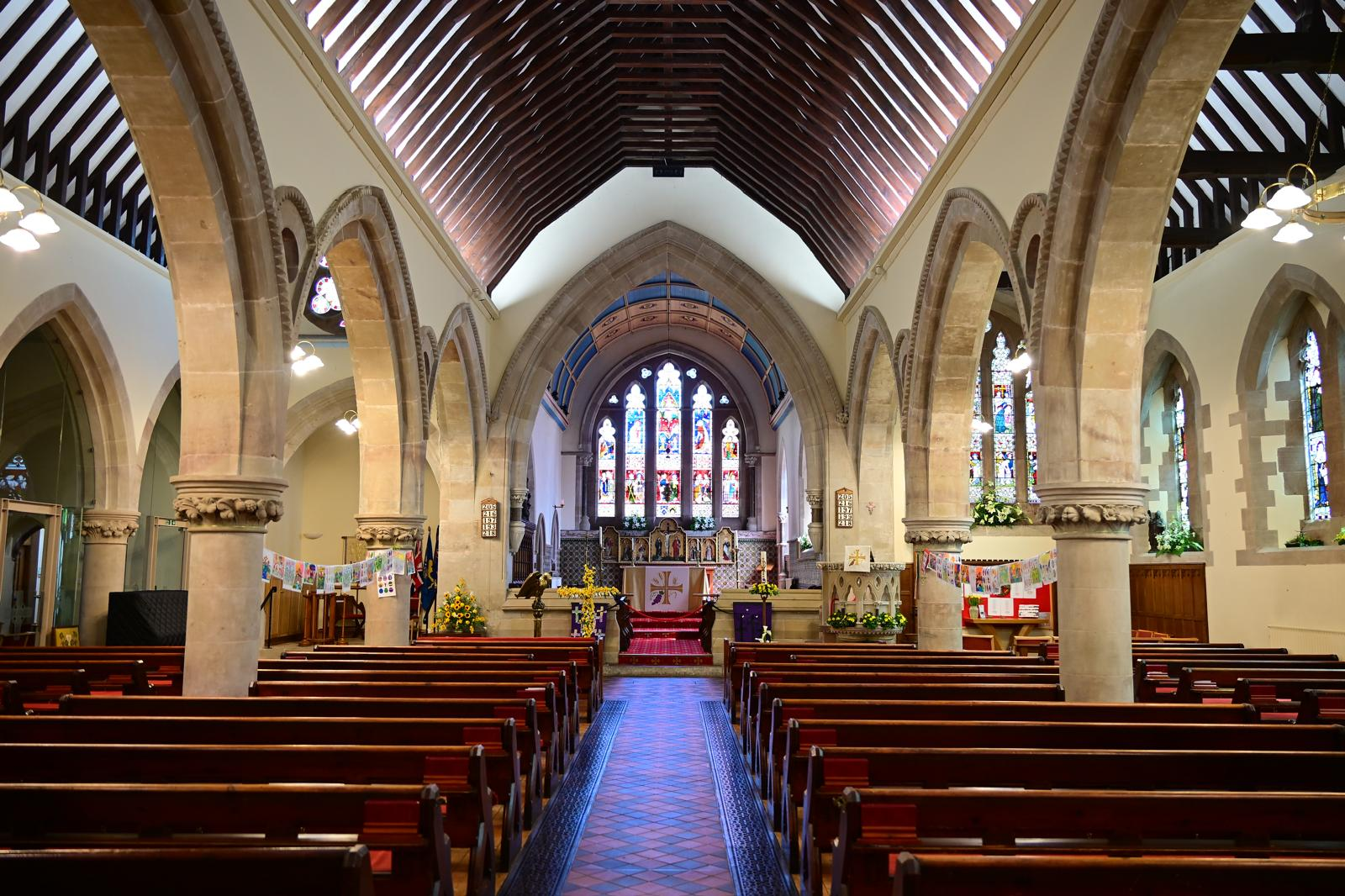
Interior view of nave and chancel

Sited within a substantial churchyard on the northern side of Wombourne's historic village green, St Benedict Biscop is built of pink Staffordshire sandstone with a plain tiled roof. Its plan consists of a nave, north and south aisles, a north chapel, a south porch, a chancel with a north vestry and organ chamber, and a west tower with spire.

The oldest extant part of the church is the 14th century west tower and corresponding spire. The tower has a two-light west window with pointed head, clock faces on the south and west sides, stepped plinth, three molded string courses and a crenellated parapet with gargoyles. Rising above, recessed within the parapet, is a soaring octagonal spire with four crocketed corner pinnacles and three tiers of lucarnes with ogee heads.

In the 16th century a north aisle was added to the church, parts of which may remain in situ despite the two 19th-century rebuilds.

Street's design for St Benedict Biscop - which involved the complete rebuilding of nave, chancel, aisles and vestry - employs the conceit of incorporating elements from different stylistic periods in order to imply that the new church had in fact evolved piecemeal over the centuries. As a result, the south aisle is equipped with Early English-style lancet windows, the chancel with windows in the Decorated style, and the north aisle with windows to a Perpendicular design. An inscription carved into the gable above the south porch quotes from the Book of Revelation 21:25, that ‘THE GATES OF IT SHALL NOT BE SHUT BY DAY’.

=== Interior ===
Inside, Street's arcade has stiff leaf capitals with painted images of the instruments of the passion recessed in six roundels between each arch. Street also designed the notable whitewashed sandstone pulpit with stiff leaf carving and the polychrome paneled ceiling in the chancel. Glazed Minton tiles, present on all three walls of the chancel, frame a painted reredos behind the altar, made to Street's design by Clayton and Bell. It shows the Crucifixion to the centre flanked by saints.

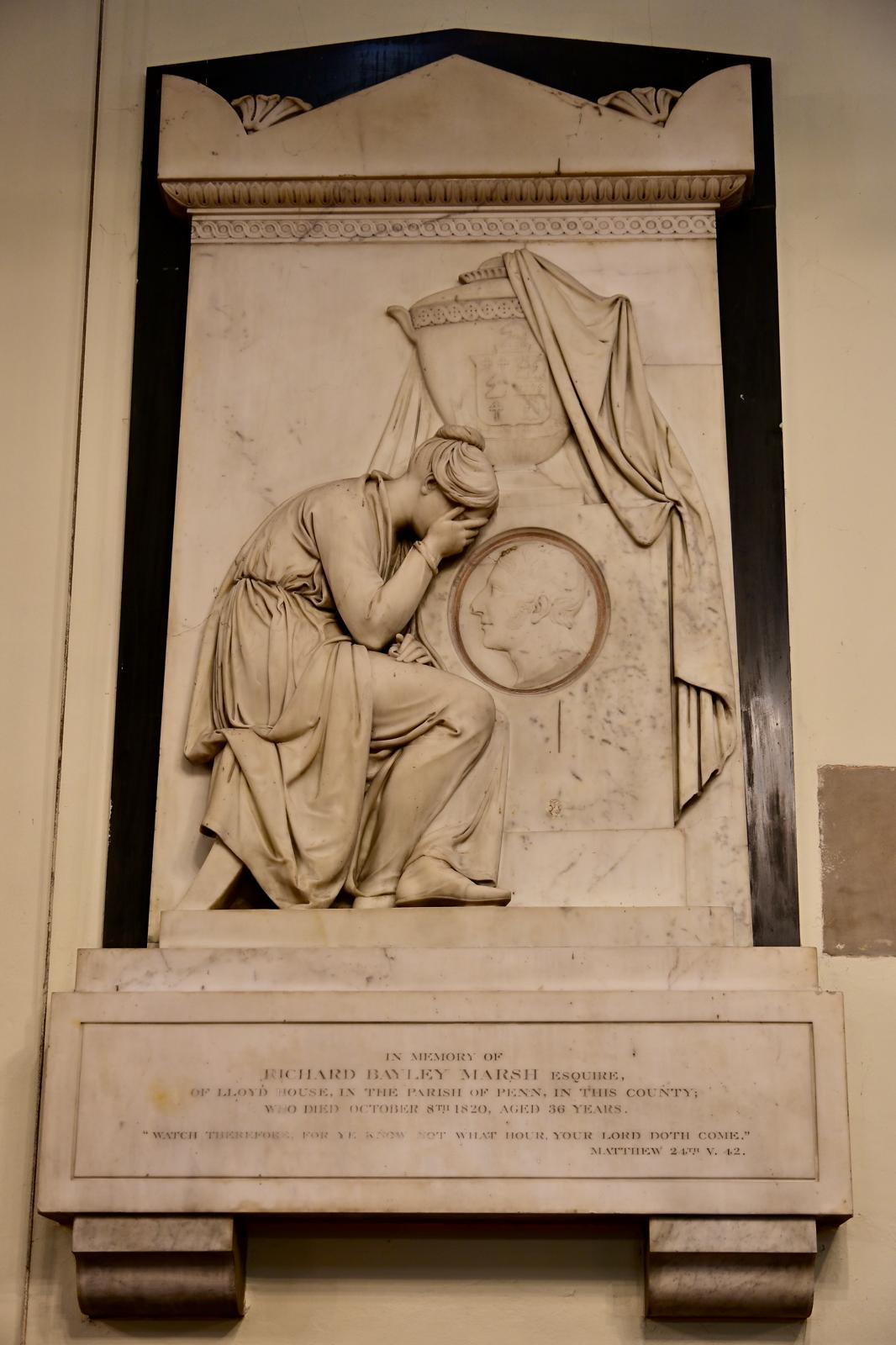
1821 memorial to Richard Marsh by Francis Chantrey

Few fittings remain in the church from prior to Street's 1867 rebuild. A fine Neoclassical wall monument to Richard Bailey Marsh of Lloyd House is located in the north aisle. It depicts in marble a kneeling woman in mourning next to an urn and medallion portrait of Marsh. It is the work of Francis Leggatt Chantrey and dated 1821. It would have been reinstalled twice during the two 19th-century rebuilds. It was also drawn by William Peploe Wood in 1837, while still on the wall of the original medieval building. The font meanwhile, situated by the south-west entrance is likely the only survivor of the 1840 church. In 1905 it was crowned with an elaborate spire-shaped oak cover.

On south wall is a late-medieval alabaster relief carving showing the Parable of the Good Samaritan, donated in the late 19th century by Thomas Shaw-Hellier of the Wodehouse.

=== Stained glass ===
St Benedict Biscop is blessed with a considerable collection of fine stained glass. The five-light east window in the chancel was commissioned from Clayton and Bell as part of the 1866-1867 rebuilding. Though faded, it depicts Christ Enthroned to the centre, flanked by the Virgin Mary and St Christopher to the left and St John the Baptist and St Paul to the right. On the lower register, St Peter and St John the Evangelist occupy the central light, flanked by the four patron saints of the British Isles, St George of England, St Patrick of Ireland, St Andrew of Scotland and St David of Wales. To the far left are images of St Benedict Biscop and St Cuthbert, and on the far right, St Lawrence and St Stephen.

Both windows on the south side of the chancel, and the window at the east end of the south aisle that depicts scenes from the Passion, are also by Clayton and Bell and formed part of the same 1866-1867 commission.

Seven windows in the nave and an eighth located in the tower base are all from the studio of Charles Eamer Kempe. Depicting various saints, they were added piecemeal during the second half of the 19th century and early 20th century, primarily as memorial commissions.

The Lady Chapel has two windows by Graham Chaplin that form a single commission, showing the Holy Spirit during Annunciation and Pentecost, installed in 2000 to celebrate the Millennium. Chaplin also designed the 2005 St Benedict Biscop window in the west wall of the north aisle. It contains images of both the church in Wombourne and St Peter's Church, Monkwearmouth, founded by St Benedict Biscop in AD 674–5 as one of the two churches of the double monastery of Monkwearmouth–Jarrow Abbey.

=== Bells ===
St Benedict Biscop has a ring of eight bells. Six were cast in 1744 by Henry Bagley III, and are inscribed with the names of the donors. Two trebles were added in 1890, originally cast by James Barwell and recast in 1996 by Taylor of Loughborough. All eight bells were re-hung in 1953 and again in 1997.

== See also ==
- Listed buildings in Wombourne
