= Geraint Bowen =

Geraint Bowen may refer to:

- Geraint Bowen (musician) (born 1963), musical director of the Hereford Three Choirs Festival
- Geraint Bowen (poet) (1915–2011), Welsh language poet and Archdruid of the Eisteddfod
