= Kenneth Bowen (tenor) =

Welsh singer and musical director (1932–2018)

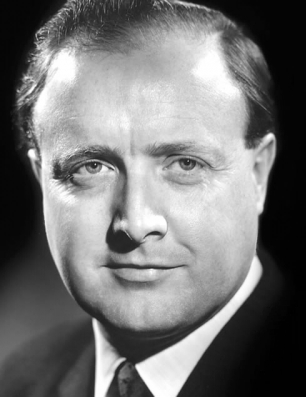
- Born: 1 August 1932; Llanelli, Wales
- Died: 1 September 2018 (aged 86); Cheltenham, England
- Occupation: Tenor

Kenneth Bowen singing the first verse of Ar Lan y Môr

Kenneth Bowen (3 August 1932 – 1 September 2018) was a Welsh tenor who was Head of Vocal Studies at the Royal Academy of Music in London.

== Personal life ==
Bowen was born in Llanelli in 1932. His father worked for the Great Western Railway and his mother was a nurse. He studied at Llanelli Boys' Grammar School, University College of Wales, Aberystwyth and St John's College, Cambridge. Bowen married Angela (née Evenden) in 1959; they separated in 1995. The couple had two sons: the arts administrator Meurig Bowen and the organist and conductor Geraint Bowen.

== Career ==
Whilst at St John's College, Cambridge, Bowen was a choral scholar under George Guest. Bowen sang his first Messiah as a soloist in 1954, and also sang Handel's Athaliah in the same year. In 1957, Bowen made his professional debut for the New Opera Company. From 1964 he sang over 15 times at The Proms at the Royal Albert Hall. In 1966, Bowen sang at the Ledlanet Nights Festival in Scotland, and he performed with the Royal Scottish National Orchestra as a soloist on multiple occasions.

In 1969, he sang at the Investiture of the Prince of Wales, and in 1982, he sang at the opening of St David's Hall in Cardiff. In 1983, Bowen co-founded the London Welsh Chorale, where he served as conductor until 2008. During his career, he sang at multiple National Eisteddfods as well as with the Welsh National Opera company, The Royal Opera and the English National Opera. From 1967 until 1991, Bowen was a professor at the Royal Academy of Music. Bowen had many Welsh students, including Aled Jones, Neal Davies and Huw Rhys-Evans. He retired from singing in 1988.

In his life, Bowen sang Edward Elgar's The Dream of Gerontius over 200 times, and once performed Messiah 17 times in a month. He was also known for performing in the operas The Magic Flute, Don Giovanni, The Abduction from the Seraglio, King Priam, and Death in Venice. He also sang Welsh language songs, and was known for performing the works of the modern Welsh composers William Mathias, Alun Hoddinott, Grace Williams and Dilys Elwyn-Edwards. Bowen also sang for many years at the Three Choirs Festival.

== Awards ==
Bowen won multiple International vocal competitions, including Geneva, Liverpool, Munich and 's-Hertogenbosch.

== Death ==
Bowen died aged 86 on 1 September 2018 in Cheltenham, England.
