= Listed buildings in Lower Penn =

Lower Penn is a civil parish in the district of South Staffordshire, Staffordshire, England. It contains seven listed buildings that are recorded in the National Heritage List for England. All the listed buildings are designated at Grade II, the lowest of the three grades, which is applied to "buildings of national importance and special interest". The parish contains the villages of Lower Penn and Orton, and Castlecroft, which is a suburb of Wolverhampton, and the surrounding area. The listed buildings consist of houses, cottages and farmhouses and associated structures.

== Buildings ==
Name and location	Photograph	Date	Notes
Lower Penn Farmhouse; 52.56221°N 2.19261°W	—	16th to 17th century	The farmhouse, later a private house, was remodelled and extended in the 18th century. It has a timber framed core, largely replaced in red brick, and has tile roofs. There is an L-shaped plan, consisting of the main house, a service wing to the north and a cross-wing on the rear to the south. The main house has two storeys and an attic, five bays, and two gables. In the centre is a porch and a doorway with a segmental head. The windows are casements with segmental heads and hood mould bands. The service wing has one and two storeys, both parts with dentilled eaves bands. There is a lean-to porch, and a flight of external steps. The cross-wing has two storeys and an attic, and contains a bay window.
Malthouse Cottage and Maltings; 52.56172°N 2.19303°W		17th century	The older part is the cottage, which is timber framed and partly replaced in brick, the front is roughcast and painted, and the roof is tiled. There is one storey and an attic, and three bays. On the front is a gabled porch, the windows are casements, and there are gabled dormers. Inside, there is exposed timber framing. Attached to the left is a malthouse dating from the late 18th or the 19th century. In the front is a brick kiln with a pyramidal roof and a rectangular cowl, and one storey projects at the rear.
Walnut Tree Cottage; 52.56288°N 2.19771°W		17th century	The cottage is timber framed with a tile roof. There is one storey and an attic, and two bays. In the ground floor is a doorway and two bay windows, and above are two gabled dormers.
Castlecroft Farmhouse; 52.57774°N 2.19618°W	—	Early 18th century	The farmhouse is in painted brick with a tile roof. There are two storeys and an attic, a main range of three bays, a two-storey single-bay extension to the right, and a lean-to extension to the left. In the centre is a gabled porch with Tudor arched openings, to the left is a bracketed bow window, to the right is a gabled attic dormer, and the other windows are casements with segmental heads.
Langley Farmhouse, garden wall and gate piers 52.56839°N 2.19663°W	—	Mid 18th century	A red brick farmhouse with storey bands, a dentilled eaves band, and a tile roof. There are two storeys and an attic, and three bays. In the centre is a gabled porch, and the windows are sashes. The front garden is partly enclosed by wall that has square end piers, and gate piers with gadrooned vases.
Manor Farmhouse; 52.56160°N 2.19416°W	—	Mid 18th century	A red brick farmhouse with an eaves band and a tile roof. There are three storeys, and an L-shaped plan consisting of a main range of five bays, a rear wing, and a single-storey extension to the right. On the front is a gabled porch, and the windows are casements, those in the lower two floors with segmental heads.
Orton House, former stable and wash house 52.55608°N 2.19334°W	—	Mid 18th century	The house is in red brick, with coved eaves and a tile roof with stepped verges. It has three storeys. and an L-shaped plan, consisting of a main range with five bays, a rear wing, and outbuildings consisting of a former stable and wash house at the rear. The central doorway has a rectangular fanlight and a gabled hood, and the windows are casements, those in the lower two floors with wedge lintels grooved as voussoirs, and raised keystones. In the right gable end are flight ledges and blocked entrances to a former pigeon loft.
