= Meurig Bowen =

British artistic director

Meurig Bowen is a British arts administrator who works mainly in festival and orchestral programming. Since 2020 he has been Chief Executive and artistic director of the Britten Sinfonia.

He is the younger son of Welsh tenor Kenneth Bowen (1932–2018) and brother of Hereford Cathedral Director of Music Geraint Bowen.

Bowen was educated at William Ellis School, London, and King's College, Cambridge, where he was a choral scholar (1985–88). After graduating he spent six years at a London artist management company, where he was administrator of the Hilliard Ensemble. He then spent six years as artistic administrator of the Australian Chamber Orchestra in Sydney. He returned to the UK as director of the Lichfield Festival from 2002, and subsequently head of programming at the Aldeburgh Festival, before in 2007 becoming artistic director of the Cheltenham Music Festival, succeeding Martyn Brabbins; he remained there until 2017. In December 2017 he became Head of Artistic Planning at the BBC National Orchestra and Chorus of Wales.

In 2017, Quarto Books/Wide Eyed Editions published The School of Music, a children's book they commissioned him to co-wrote with his wife Rachel, illustrated by Daniel Frost. The English language edition was followed in 2018 by translations in Brazil, Bulgaria, China, France, Korea and Russia. In 2020, Quarto pulped all available copies globally, due to the book's associated website being hacked by extortionists.

In August 2020, Bowen was appointed as Chief Executive and artistic director of the Britten Sinfonia, a chamber orchestra based in Cambridge, where he remains as of 2023.

At times, Bowen has been active as a music journalist and commentator, writing for the national press and for CD liner notes, notably on the Hyperion label.

Bowen's two-hander for actor and pianist, Erik Satie: Memoirs of a Pear-Shaped Life, was premiered at the 2015 Cheltenham Music Festival, and has since been performed at the Presteigne and Canterbury Festivals, St George's Bristol, in Oxford and New York.

== Notes ==
Preceded by Martyn Brabbins	Artistic Director, Cheltenham Music Festival; 2007-2017	Succeeded by Alison Balsom
