= Royal Military Exhibition =

London military exhibition in 1890

Coordinates: 51°29′9″N 0°9′28″W

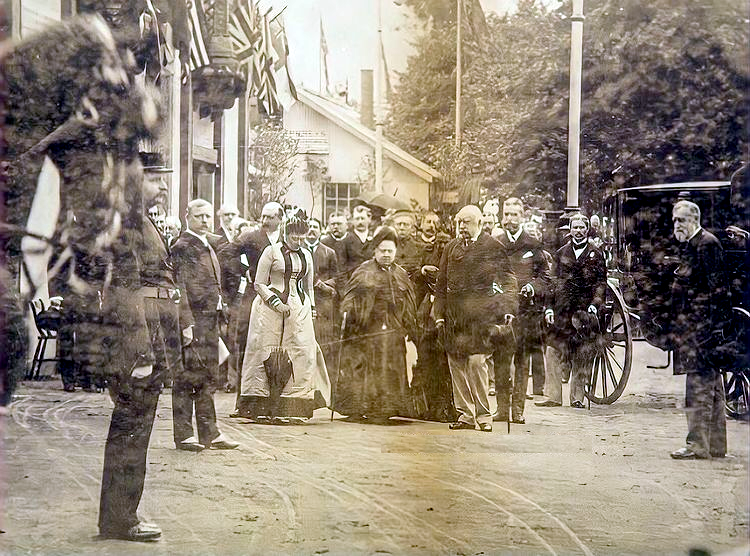
Queen Victoria visits the Royal Military Exhibition, 1890

The Royal Military Exhibition was held in 1890 at Gordon House, Chelsea and the grounds of the Royal Hospital to display the work of soldiers of all ranks in the British Army, Royal Marines and Auxiliary Forces. Profit from the exhibition was to support the Church of England Soldier's Institutes located on Army bases.

The exhibition was opened on 7 May 1890 by the Prince of Wales and featured three themes, the industrial work of the soldier, articles of equipment, collection of pictures and other objects of military interest. The exhibition also had tournament displays of military bands, tug-of-war and demonstration ascents of war balloons. The musical division was co-ordinated by Colonel Thomas Bradney Shaw-Hellier, commandant of the Royal Military School of Music. Over the five-month exhibition, 74 military bands came from all over the country to perform beside the River Thames in central London. A large collection of musical instruments, particularly wind instruments, was displayed, and a catalogue was issued the following year.

The exhibition closed on 1 November 1890 with a firework display, it was announced that £10,000 had been handed over to the Church of England Soldier's Institute.
