= College of Vicars Choral =

Building in Hereford, England

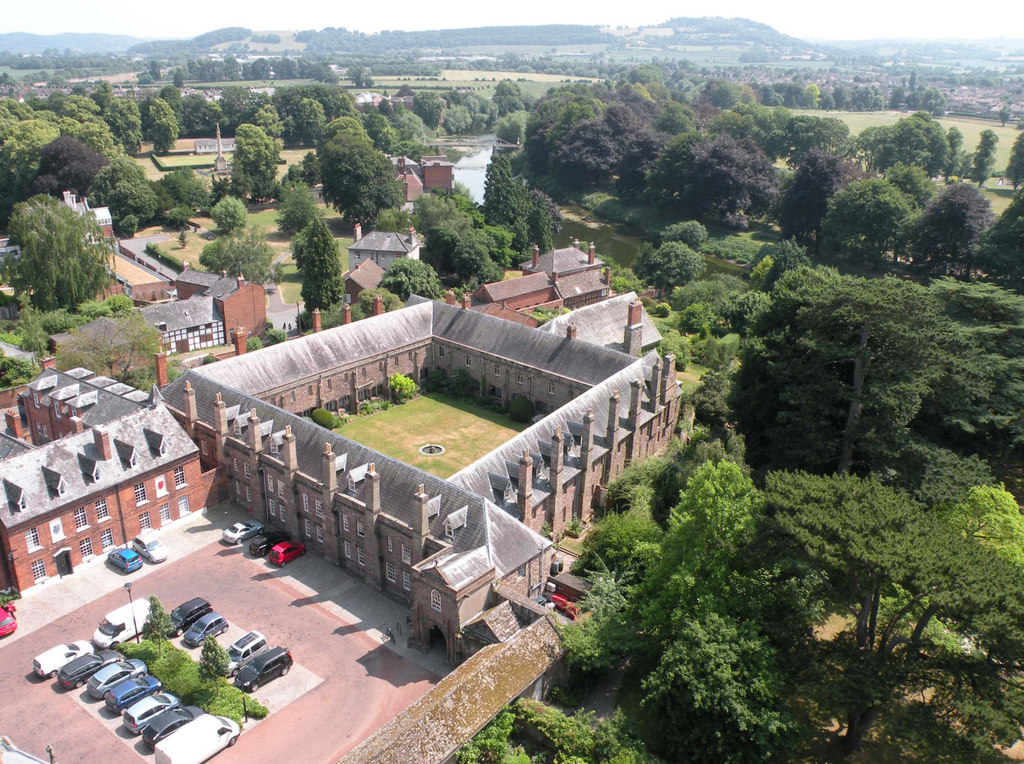
- The college viewed from the tower of Hereford Cathedral

- Shown in Herefordshire
- 52.0536°N 2.7152°W
- Location: Hereford

History
- Built: 1473

Listed Building – Grade I
- Official name: College of Vicars Choral, Cathedral Close
- Designated: 10 June 1952
- Reference no.: 1196809

The College of Vicars Choral is a building in Hereford, England, which was originally built to house the vicars choral, or lay clerks, of the adjacent Hereford Cathedral. The building currently houses offices and residences for the cathedral staff, and its cloister is open to the public. The college is a grade I listed building.

The college building stands to the south-east of the cathedral. Its earliest parts date from c. 1473, when Bishop Stanberry had the college moved from Castle Street a short distance to the east. It takes the form of a quadrangle, with four two-storey ranges around a central courtyard; the courtyard-facing elevations of the ranges contain a cloister on their ground floor. There is an early seventeenth century chapel in the east range, and a late seventeenth century hall projects south from the south range. The college is connected to the cathedral by a corridor, probably of late fifteenth-century date, which runs between the north-west corner of the former and the south-west transept of the latter.

The vicars choral at Hereford were incorporated as a college in 1395, at which time there were twenty-seven members. Their number was reduced to twelve, with an additional five lay members, in 1637. The college continued to provide singers for the choir of Hereford Cathedral until 1937, when the college was dissolved.

The silverware of the College was sold at Sotheby's in 1938 in an attempt to raise £2,500 for the restoration of the college buildings. The lots included a pair of George I beer mugs by Thomas Parr of London, George II tankards by Thomas Wright of London, and a Charles II silver punch bowl bearing the makers mark “E.G. London, 1860”. The last was one of only two in the country, the other belonging to Chester Corporation.
