= Three Counties Showground =

Showground site in Worcestershire, England

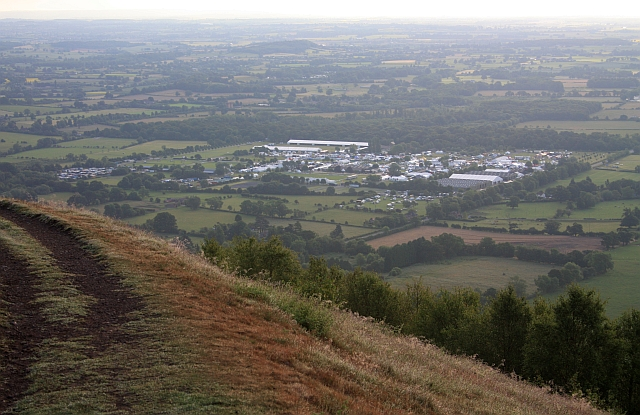
- Interactive map of Three Counties Showground
- Address: Malvern; Worcestershire; WR13 6NW; England
- Coordinates: 52°04′48″N 02°18′42″W
- Owner: Three Counties Agricultural Society
- Surface: Grass
- Acreage: 90 acres (36 ha)

Construction
- Opened: 1958

Website
- www.threecounties.co.uk

The Three Counties Showground is a showground site in Malvern, Worcestershire, England, covering 90 acres (36 ha) owned by the Three Counties Agricultural Society. The Three Counties refers to the agrarian counties of Gloucestershire, Herefordshire and Worcestershire. The first show at the site was held in 1958 and was attended by Queen Elizabeth The Queen Mother.

The annual Royal Three Counties Show takes place at the Three Counties Showground in June and is a celebration of the British countryside that includes displays, food, livestock, produce and entertainment. In 2018, the show celebrated 60 years of being hosted at the Three Counties Showground.

The showground is home to the annual RHS Malvern Spring Festival, which had an attendance of 102,000 over the four day festival in 2019.

Anne, Princess Royal is a regular visitor to the Three Counties Showground and first went to the venue in 1976. She has since served as the Society's President (1981), opened the new members' complex overlooking the main arena (1986), attended National Pony Society's 100th Summer Championship Show and the National Sheep Association Show (2006) and was guest of honour at the RHS Malvern Spring Festival, as part of its 25th birthday celebrations that were held in 2010. In 2014, she accepted an invitation to become patron of the Royal Three Counties Show.

The show owes its beginnings to 1797 to a John Clerk who commented that there was no agricultural show in Herefordshire, so local farmers decided to hold a first show the following year under the aegis of the Earl of Oxford. By 1922 the shows of the counties of Herefordshire, Worcestershire, and Gloucestershire had merged into the Three Counties Agricultural Society. The 3-day event takes place annually since 1958 on a permanent 70-acre (28 ha) site near Malvern, typically attracting around 25,000 visitors.

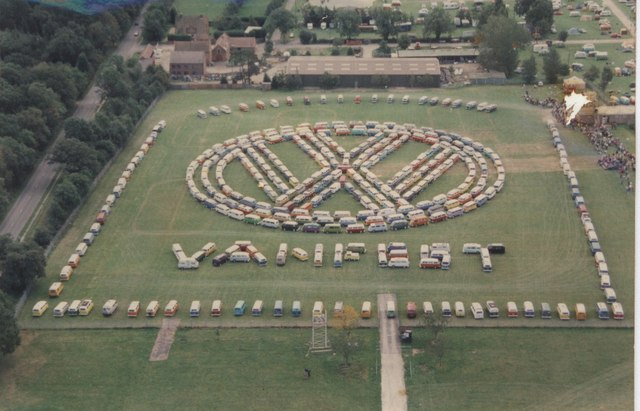
Vanfest – a festival celebrating Volkswagen Type 2 "vans" – has been held at the Three Counties Showground since the 1990s.
