= Busfest =

English festival

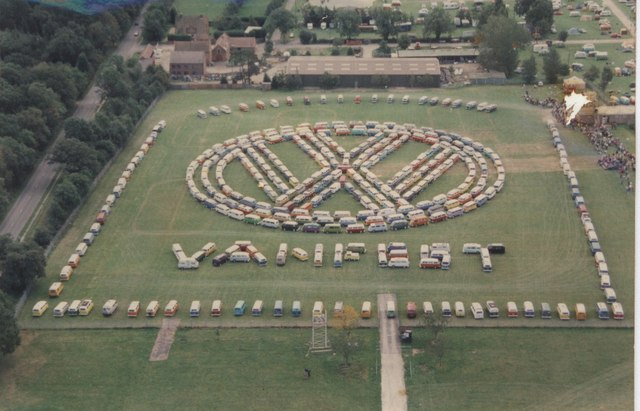
Vanfest in 1997.

Busfest (known before 2012 as Vanfest) is a three-day annual festival held in early September at the Three Counties Showground in Malvern, Worcestershire, England, for owners of VW camper-vans—the Volkswagen Type 2 Transporter or "Bus". Busfest is one of the longest-running UK VW Camper festivals.

== Description ==
The first Vanfest was held in 1994.

Busfest has attracted attendees from around the world.

The festival is owned and produced by Vanfest Ltd and it is the largest VW Transporter festival in the world, attended by up to 9,000 vans and 45,000 people. Simon Holloway owns the event and is the Festival Support Director, Elise Holloway is the Festival Coordinator, and Neil Pickett is the Festival Director.

Attendees camp in their vans over the three days in large campsites within the showground. Vans are primarily Volkswagen Type 2s, but other Volkswagen camper vans and vans from companies like Renault are also present.

The festival, which is open to day visitors as well as campers, has over 250 trade stands, a main arena with a full daytime entertainment schedule, a fun fair, trade and demonstration stands, and exhibitions.

There are several live music stages at Busfest. Recent bands who have appeared there include Slade, Showaddywaddy, Dr & The Medics, The Drifters, The Rubettes, The Commitments, Bad Manners, Right Said Fred, Brotherhood Of Man, and Odyssey.
