= Orton, Staffordshire =

Hamlet in Staffordshire, England

Coordinates: 52.5551°N 2.1948°W

Orton is a hamlet in the South Staffordshire district, in the English county of Staffordshire. Nearby settlements include the city of Wolverhampton and the villages of Wombourne and Trysull.

In 1817, William Pitt described the hamlet as being in Wombourne parish: it contained a few farmhouses and other residential buildings. He also referred to the hamlet as Overton. In 1872 a gazetteer entry described Orton as a liberty in Wombourn parish, Stafford; on the Birmingham canal, 3½ miles S W of Wolverhampton. Pop., 169.

== See also ==
- Listed buildings in Lower Penn
- Listed buildings in Wombourne
