= Listed buildings in Wombourne =

Wombourne is a civil parish in the district of South Staffordshire, Staffordshire, England. It contains 29 listed buildings that are recorded in the National Heritage List for England. Of these, five are at Grade II*, the middle of the three grades, and the others are at Grade II, the lowest grade. The parish contains the large village of Wombourne, the smaller village of Orton, and the surrounding area. In the parish is a country house, The Wodehouse, which is listed, together with a number of associated structures. The Staffordshire and Worcestershire Canal runs through the parish, and the listed buildings associated with it are bridges, locks, a weir, and a toll house. Most of the other listed buildings are houses and associated structures, cottages, farmhouses and farm buildings. The rest of the listed buildings include a church, two road bridges, a watermill. a water pumping station, and a war memorial.

== Key ==
Grade	Criteria
II*	Particularly important buildings of more than special interest
II	Buildings of national importance and special interest

== Buildings ==
Name and location	Photograph	Date	Notes	Grade
Church of St. Benedict Biscop; 52.53633°N 2.18318°W		14th century	The oldest part of the church is the 14th century west tower, the north aisle dates probably from the 16th century, and the rest of the church was built in 1866–67 to a design by George Edmund Street in Gothic Revival style. The church is built in sandstone with tile roofs, and consists of a nave, north and south aisles, a north chapel, a south porch, a chancel with a north vestry and organ chamber, and a west steeple. The steeple has a tower with three stages, a two-light west window with a pointed head, clock faces on the south and west sides, an embattled parapet with crocketed corner pinnacles and gargoyles, and a recessed spire with three tiers of lucarnes with ogee heads.	II
The Wodehouse; 52.53959°N 2.17028°W	—	14th century	A small country house, it has since been extended, remodeled and altered. It has a timber framed core, and the exterior is in rendered brick, with tile roofs. There is an irregular E-shaped plan, and the south front has two storeys and attics, seven bays, and flanking wings, a central porch and shaped gables with finials. Attached to the right wing is a chapel.	II*
12 High Street; 52.53488°N 2.18352°W	—	17th century	A house, later an office, it was altered in the 19th century. The building is timber framed with painted brick infill, some repair in brick, and it has a tile roof. There is one storey and an attic, and two bays. In the centre is a doorway, with a shop window to the right, and a four-paned window to the left. Above, there are two gabled dormers.	II
Pauper's Cottage and Wombrook Cottage; 52.53259°N 2.18456°W	—	1716	A row of three cottages, originally almshouses, in red brick, with a storey band, and a tile roof. There is one storey and attics, three bays, and rear extensions. The doorways have triangular heads, the windows are casements, there are four flat-roofed dormers, and in the centre is a datestone.	II
Mansion Court; 52.52898°N 2.21079°W	—	Early 18th century	The house was extended in the 20th century and divided into flats. It is in red brick with a moulded eaves cornice and a tile roof. There is a main block of three storeys and three bays, projecting L-shaped wings, and recessed wings on the sides. In the centre is a doorway with engaged columns, and the windows are sashes with raised keystones.	II
Orton Grange; 52.55280°N 2.19283°W		Early 18th century	The oldest part of the farmhouse is the cross-wing, which was altered in 1685. The main part of the house dates from about 1800, and it was extended at the rear in the 20th century. The early part is timber framed, the main part is in brick, it is all rendered, and the roofs are tiled. The main part has dentilled eaves, three storeys and three bays. The central doorway has reeded pilasters, a fanlight, and a broken pediment, and the windows are sashes with segmental heads. The cross-wing has two storeys and an attic, in the attic is a casement window and a datestone, and the other windows are sashes. There are single-storey single-bay lean-to on each side.	II
Barn, The Wodehouse; 52.54094°N 2.16932°W		Early 18th century	The barn is timber framed on a high brick plinth, with infill and some rebuilding in brick, and a tile roof. There is one storey and five bays. The barn contains central barn doors, and in the right gable end is a doorway and a pitching hatch.	II
Coach house and stable block, The Wodehouse; 52.53948°N 2.16950°W	—	Early 18th century	The building is in red brick with a moulded eaves cornice, and a tile roof. There are two storeys and eleven bays, the middle three bays projecting under a pediment, and the outer bays being gabled cross-wings with coped verges and draped vase finials at the corners. In the central bays are two segmental carriage arches flanked by recesses containing doorways each with a moulded architrave, a pulvinated frieze, and a bracketed pediment, above which is a segmental arch with a moulded architrave and a raised keystone. Most of the windows are sashes with segmental arches and raised keystones, and each of the cross-wings has a ground floor Venetian window. In the centre of the roof is a cupola with semicircular arched openings, an ogee-shaped dome and a dragon weathervane.	II*
Wodehouse Farmhouse and Mill; 52.54128°N 2.16935°W	—	Early 18th century	The farmhouse and watermill are in red brick with tile roofs. The farmhouse has storey bands, an eaves band, three storeys, and four bays. The doorway has a rectangular fanlight, and the windows are casements with segmental heads containing mullions and transoms. The mill projecting to the left has three storeys, a dentilled eaves band, and three bays. The doorways and windows have segmental heads, and inside the mill is a cast iron overshot wheel.	II*
White Cross House, Orton; 52.55428°N 2.19391°W	—	1736	A farmhouse, later a private house, it is in red brick with storey bands, a dentilled eaves band, and a tile roof. There are two storeys and an attic, and an L-shaped plan, with a main block of five bays, and a short rear wing. In the centre is a gabled porch and a doorway with a rectangular fanlight, the windows are casements with segmental heads, and there are three gabled dormers.	II
7 Maypole Street, outbuilding and wall 52.53550°N 2.18571°W	—	1743	The house and the outbuilding are in red brick with tile roofs. The house has dentilled eaves, two storeys and an attic, a double-pile plan, and three bays. In the centre is a trellised porch and a round-headed doorway with a fanlight. The windows are casements with mullions and transoms, wedge lintels and raised keystones. The window above the doorway is blind and has an inscribed keystone, and in the attic are two gabled dormers. At the rear is a two-bay wing with a bow window. The outbuilding to the south has one storey and lofts, and two bays, and consists of a former coach house and stables. In front of the outbuilding is a tall brick wall, with a lower wall in front of the house.	II
Langley Farmhouse, wall and gate piers 52.56839°N 2.19663°W	—	Mid 18th century	A red brick farmhouse with storey bands, a dentilled eaves band, and a tile roof. There are two storeys and an attic, and three bays. In the centre is a rustic porch with a hipped roof, and the windows are ashes. On two sides of the front garden is a brick wall with stone coping, containing end piers and gate piers, the latter surmounted by gadrooned vases.	II
Gravel Hill Bridge; 52.53277°N 2.18523°W		18th century	The bridge carries Gavel Hill road over Wom Brook. It is in red brick with stone dressings, and consists of a single segmental arch. The bridge has a parapet band and a plain coped parapet with square end piers.	II
Bridge over Wodehouse Mill Pool; 52.54087°N 2.17021°W		18th century	The bridge carries the 463 road over the Wodehouse Mill Pool. It is in stone and consists of a single semicircular arch. The bridge has rusticated voussoirs and a raised keystone, it is flanked by rusticated pilasters, and has a moulded parapet string course and a plain coped parapet.	II
Dam, Wodehouse Mill Pool; 52.53981°N 2.17130°W	—	18th century	The dam at the south end of the mill pool provides a causeway to The Wodehouse. It is in stone, and consists of nine semicircular arches with rusticated voussoirs and raised keystones, all of which are flanked by pilaster buttresses. The dam has a moulded parapet string course, and a plain coped parapet.	II
Wombourne House and Millbrook, High Street; 52.53521°N 2.18309°W		Mid to late 18th century	A house, later a house and office, the building is in red brick with a dentilled eaves band and a tile roof. There are three storeys, three bays, and a small rear wing. The windows are casements, those in the lower two floors with segmental heads. There are two doorways, the doorway to the right has a segmental head.	II
6 Gavel Hill; 52.53390°N 2.18564°W		1768	A red brick house with corner pilasters, a moulded eaves cornice, and a tile roof. There are two storeys and two bays. The central doorway has a bracketed cornice hood, and above it is a datestone. The windows are sashes, those in the ground floor with wedge lintels and raised and fluted keystones.	II
Bridge No. 42 (Botterham Bridge), lock and weir 52.51972°N 2.20741°W		c. 1770	The bridge crossing the Staffordshire and Worcestershire Canal is in red brick, and consists of a single segmental arch. It has quoined imposts, voussoirs, a band, and a ramped coped parapet. The staircase lock has two chambers lined with red and blue engineering brick, and three timber gates. To the west of the upper lock is a circular weir with a coped parapet and a central domed cage.	II
Bridge No. 46 (Bumblehole Bridge) and lock 52.53760°N 2.20056°W		c. 1770	The bridge crossing the Staffordshire and Worcestershire Canal is in red brick, and consists of a single segmental arch. The bridge has stone quoins, a dripstone, and a stone coped parapet with a considerable slope. The lock is to the rear of the bridge.	II
Bridge No. 47 (Bratch Bridge), Upper Bratch Bridge, locks and toll house 52.54175°N 2.19681°W		c. 1770	There are three locks on the Staffordshire and Worcestershire Canal, two bridges crossing it, and a toll house dating from about 1800. The buildings are in red and blue brick. The toll house has two storeys and an octagonal plan.	II
Lloyd House; 52.54770°N 2.16732°W		Late 18th century	A small country house, it is in stone with extensions in red brick, on a plinth with moulded coping, and has a reeded floor band, a moulded eaves band, dentilled overhanging eaves, and a hipped slate roof. There are two storeys and nine bays. The middle three bays project and are bowed, with a colonnade of two unfluted Ionic columns, and it is approached by three steps. At the rear are three storeys, a dentilled parapet, and a central porch with Tuscan columns, a cornice, and a flat roof.	II*
Gates and gate piers, Lloyd House; 52.54886°N 2.16976°W	—	Late 18th century	The main entrance to the drive has cast iron main and pedestrian gates flanked by four square gate piers. The piers are in rusticated stone, and each has a cornice and a ball finial.	II
Summer house, Lloyd House; 52.54862°N 2.16737°W	—	Early 19th century	The summer house in the grounds of the house is in roughcast red brick and has a hipped tile roof. There is an octagonal plan, and it contains a door with an ogee-headed fanlight, and ogee-headed windows with Y-tracery.	II
Badger's Folly; 52.55082°N 2.17389°W	—	Early 19th century	The garden folly is in sandstone and in Gothic style. It is in the form of a ruined castle with a cylindrical tower and two short lengths of wall. The tower has two storeys, and contains a four-centred arched doorway and a loop. The wall contains a doorway with a pointed head flanked by loops.	II
Cottage at Bumblehole Lock; 52.53762°N 2.20040°W		Early 19th century	The lock keeper's cottage is in painted brick with overhanging eaves and a tile roof. There are two storeys and two bays. The central doorway has a bracketed cornice hood, and the windows are casements with semicircular heads.	II
Smestow Mill; 52.52231°N 2.21310°W	—	Early 19th century (probable)	A watermill in whitewashed brick with a tile roof. It has a T-shaped plan, consisting of a main gabled block of three storeys and three bays, flanking two-storey, three-bay wings, each with a dentilled eaves band and a central pediment, and a gabled porch, and a rear wing. The left wing has a blind semicircular arch and a lunette. In the rear wing is a cast iron breastshot wheel.	II
Bearnett House; 52.55151°N 2.17359°W	—	1854	A large red brick house with painted stone dressings, quoins, a moulded sill band, a moulded eaves cornice, and a tile roof with ogee-shaped gables and finials. The house is in Jacobean style, and has two storeys. The east front has three bays, and contains a central loggia porch that has three semicircular arches with keystones and a pierced balustrade. Above it is a bow window with a strapwork parapet, and over this is a blind oculus with a keystone. The south front has four bays, the outer bays projecting and gabled, each containing a two-storey bay window with a strapwork parapet and a keyed oculus above. The windows are mullioned and transomed.	II
The Bratch Water Pumping Station; 52.54123°N 2.19566°W		1895	The water pumping station is in Ruabon red brick with dressings in blue and buff brick, stone and tile, and has a hipped slate roof. It has a rectangular plan, and a boiler house, coal store, and borehole house at the rear. There are two storeys and basement, and two bays. It has an embattled parapet, and corner corbelled bartizans with conical roofs and finials. The windows are mullioned and have polychromatic heads and tympana.	II*
War memorial 52.53610°N 2.18296°W		1920	The war memorial is in the churchyard of the Church of St. Benedict Biscop. It is in granite, and consists of an obelisk on a two-staged plinth on three steps. Carved in relief on the obelisk are a Union Jack flag, a wreath and a collar. The upper stage of the plinth tapers, on the front is an inscription, and on the sides are the names of those lost in the two World Wars.	II
