= St John's Church, Wolverhampton =

Coordinates: 52°34′52.58″N 2°7′41.53″W

St. John's Church, Wolverhampton
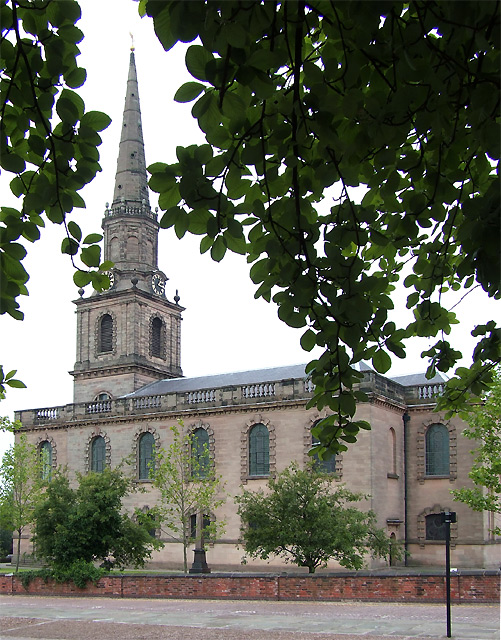
- The Church of St. John in the Square, Wolverhampton
- St. John's Church, Wolverhampton
- OS grid reference: SO 91426 98162
- Location: Wolverhampton
- Country: England
- Denomination: Church of England
- Website: St John's in the Square at Parish of Central Wolverhampton website. Wolverhampton S.John at a Church Near You.

History
- Dedication: St John the Evangelist

Architecture
- Heritage designation: Grade II* listed
- Groundbreaking: 1758
- Completed: 1776

Administration
- Diocese: Diocese of Lichfield
- Archdeaconry: Walsall
- Deanery: Wolverhampton
- Parish: Central Wolverhampton

St. John's Church is a Grade II* listed Church of England parish church in Wolverhampton.

== History ==
The church was built between 1758 and 1776 to designs of either William Baker or Roger Eykyn. It was a response to population pressures resulting from the Industrial Revolution and to the perceived threat of Dissent and Roman Catholicism in an area where Anglican ministry was limited by a unique ecclesiastical structure.

St John's was built as a chapel of ease of St Peter's Collegiate Church. The latter was a Royal Peculiar, entirely independent of the local Diocese of Lichfield. Its deans and chapter formed a college, a corporate body within canon law that had ecclesiastical control over a wide tract of Staffordshire in and to the north and east of Wolverhampton. The dean and chapter were absentee clergy who resented any threat, real or imagined, to their extremely lucrative monopolies: especially that on burials throughout the extensive parish and that on pews within the town of Wolverhampton. The deanery of Wolverhampton had been united with the far more prestigious deanery of Windsor since the late 15th century, encouraging the deans to be absentees—a situation that applied also to most of the prebendaries. However, Peniston Booth, dean from 1729 to 1765, took the unusual step of establishing a home in Wolverhampton and became more susceptible to local pressure for reform.

Wolverhampton Chapel Act 1755
- Act of Parliament
- Parliament of Great Britain
- Long title: An Act for erecting and building a new Chapel, in the Town of Wolverhampton, in the County of Stafford.
- Citation: 28 Geo. 2. c. 34
- Territorial extent: Great Britain

Dates
- Royal assent: 20 March 1755
- Commencement: 14 November 1754 (Note: Start of session.)
Other legislation
Amended by	Wolverhampton Chapel Act 1840

Status: Amended

Text of statute as originally enacted

The population of Wolverhampton itself and of the towns to the east was growing rapidly as manufacturing took hold. There was a growth of Protestant Dissent, particularly as Methodism was preached in the town from about the middle of the 18th century: in 1761 John Wesley himself preached at an inn-yard in what he called "this furious town" of Wolverhampton. Catholic recusancy was strong in the surrounding countryside, under the leadership of the Giffard family of Brewood, who succeeded in building a Catholic chapel in the guise of a private house, just to the west of St. Peter's. The threat to the dominance of the Church of England seemed urgent and Booth bowed to pressure to authorise the building of new chapels of ease at St Thomas' Church, Wednesfield, St Giles Church, Willenhall and St Leonard's Church, Bilston. With considerably more persuasion, and after a major public campaign fronted by Lord Grey, Booth finally acquiesced in the building of a new chapel of ease in Wolverhampton itself. It was authorised by an act of Parliament, the Wolverhampton Chapel Act 1755 (28 Geo. 2. c. 34), and the fine Neo-Classical church of St John quickly rose on a site enclosed in a square, at that time on the southern edge of the town.

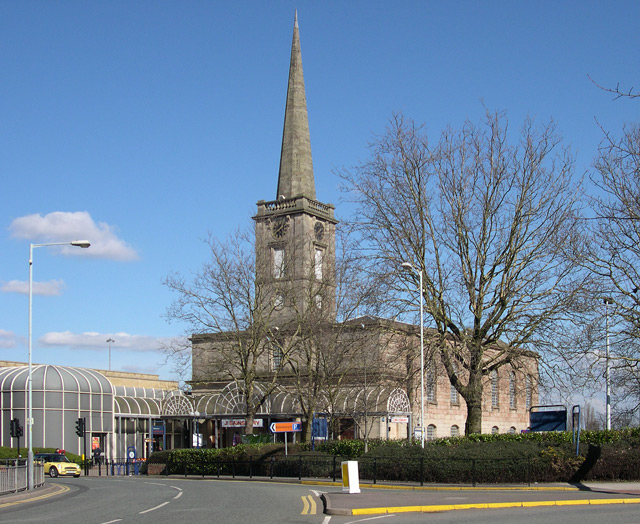
St. George's Church as part of a Sainsbury's supermarket. It now lies empty

Initially, the building of St Johns greatly relieved pressure on space at St Peter's, but continued rapid population growth made it necessary to build two more churches very close to St John's within a few decades. (One, St Paul's, was demolished in 1960 to make way for Wolverhampton Ring Road, and St George's was transformed into a Sainsbury's superstore in the 1980s.) All were initially chapels of ease, dependent on St Peter's, although the circumstances of their foundation gave their lay sponsors considerable influence, as the clergy were largely dependent on the generosity of lay benefactors for an income and for maintenance of the church building. One of these sponsors was the musical Sir Samuel Hellier, known for the Hellier Stradivarius; the minister at the time, Thomas Shaw, was his heir and changed his name to Shaw-Hellier. One of his daughters, Parthenia, married the then-current minister in 1820.

St John's remained a redoubt of the high church tradition, like St Peter's itself, while the other new foundations were low church and increasingly centres of Evangelicalism. The Royal Peculiar was widely seen as corrupt and inefficient and was out of keeping with the reforming spirit of the 19th century. Financial reforms introduced in 1811 left the clergy of St Peter's better-paid but still dependent on St John's and the other chapels for a large part of their income in fees. Friction came to a head in the 1830s, when the perpetual curate of St Peter's was the particularly quarrelsome George Oliver.

A complete change came under the terms of legislation, variously termed the Cathedrals Act 1840 and the Ecclesiastical Commissioners Act 1840, but actually entitled An Act to carry into effect, with certain Modifications, the Fourth Report of the Commissioners of Ecclesiastical Duties and Revenues. Section 21 decreed that the Wolverhampton deanery should be suppressed, along with those of Middleham, Heytesbury and Brecon. Section 51 restricted the rights of any appointees to positions within the colleges but allowed the existing deans to continue in office until their deaths. The dean, Henry Hobart, died in 1846, triggering the abolition of the deanery. In 1848, the Wolverhampton Church Act abolished the ancient College of St Peter altogether and transferred all its assets to the Ecclesiastical Commissioners. The Commissioners set up St John's and the other chapels of ease as independent parish churches, within the Diocese of Lichfield, and gave their clergy a large and much-needed pay rise. St John's survived as a parish church in its own right until the end of the 20th century, when population shifts and financial pressures finally resulted in its absorption into the Central Wolverhampton Parish.

== Organ ==
The organ dates from 1684 by Renatus Harris. It was probably built for the famous battle of the organs at Temple Church. When rejected, it was sold to Christ Church Cathedral, Dublin, and from there it was sold to St. John's church in 1762. There have been many rebuilds and restorations since it was originally obtained. A specification of the organ can be found on the National Pipe Organ Register.

=== Organists ===
- William Rudge ???? –1843
- Mr. Day 1843 – ????
- Mr. Allen 1856–1862
- Roland Rogers 1863–1867 (afterward organist of Tettenhall Parish Church, then Bangor Cathedral)
- Dr. Charles Swinnerton Heap 1868– ????
- Herbert Walter Wareing 1876–1879
- George Halford 1881-1886
- John Barker 1968–1980
- Hugh Smith 1980–present
