= Lay clerk =

Professional adult singer in a cathedral

A lay clerk, also known as a lay vicar, song man or a vicar choral, is a professional adult singer in an Anglican cathedral and often Roman Catholic cathedral in the UK, or (occasionally) college choir in Britain and Ireland. The vicars choral were substitutes for the canons. They are not in holy orders; the term "vicar" is derived from the Latin adjective vicarius ("substituted") and in this context simply means a deputy. The majority of lay clerks are male; however, female altos are nowadays becoming increasingly common.

The title refers to the laymen who were employed to sing musical sections of church services during the Middle Ages. At the time, this was often music which was evolving into a format too complicated to be sung by many ordinary clerks and priests.

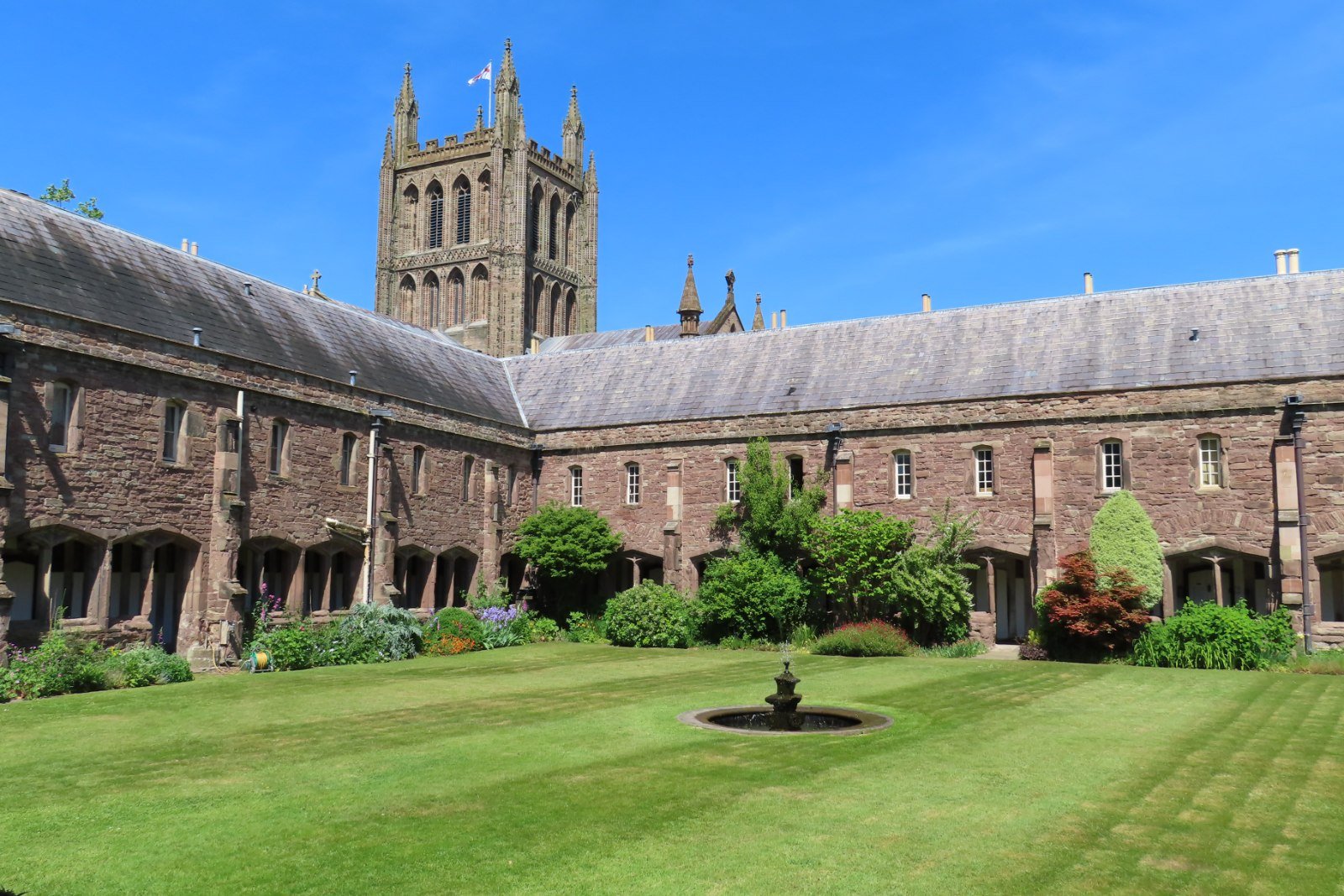
The College of Vicars Choral at Hereford

In the diocese of Hereford an endowment for six vicars choral to sing the liturgy was established in 1237, unusual for the non-monastic cathedrals where normally the canons were each responsible for providing and maintaining a vicar. The six were supposed to be two priests, two deacons, and two sub-deacons. In 1395 the vicars choral were incorporated into a college of 27 and in 1472 a new college, its handsome quadrangle still standing, was built on the site of two canons’ houses to the south east of the cathedral. This collegiate establishment at Hereford was most unusual; the only other cathedral with a similar body was St. Paul's where there was a much smaller college of minor canons. Although these vicars choral gradually also became chantry priests, the establishment at Hereford survived the Reformation.

With the post-war proliferation of Cathedral choral scholarships, however, many cathedral or collegiate choirs comprise a balance between choral scholars (or, as at New College, Oxford, and Magdalen College, Oxford, "academical clerks") – university or "gap year" students who combine their studies or other commitments with singing – and lay clerks. Choral scholars sing alongside lay clerks for usually around half the latter's salary. Many universities now offer such scholarships to fill places within college and cathedral choirs.

Undergraduates admitted to a College on the basis of their ability and potential in both singing and academic study are traditionally called "Choral Scholars". At Christ Church, Magdalen College, and New College, Oxford, they are called "Academical Clerks". "Clerks Choral", or Choral Clerks are also found in a few of the ancient Cathedrals and collegiate churches in the United Kingdom and Ireland however these singers are more usually styled "lay clerks" or occasionally "lay vicars" or "lay vicars choral".

== Historic titles ==
- Choral Bedesman – After the Reformation, in 1583 Alderman Richard Briggs endowed St Botolph's Church, Boston with four choral bedesmen “to behave themselves in celebrating divine service for ever” . Four adult voices in the choir retain this position today.
