= Three Counties (Gloucestershire, Herefordshire and Worcestershire) =

Area of England

Coordinates: 52.0°N 2.4°W

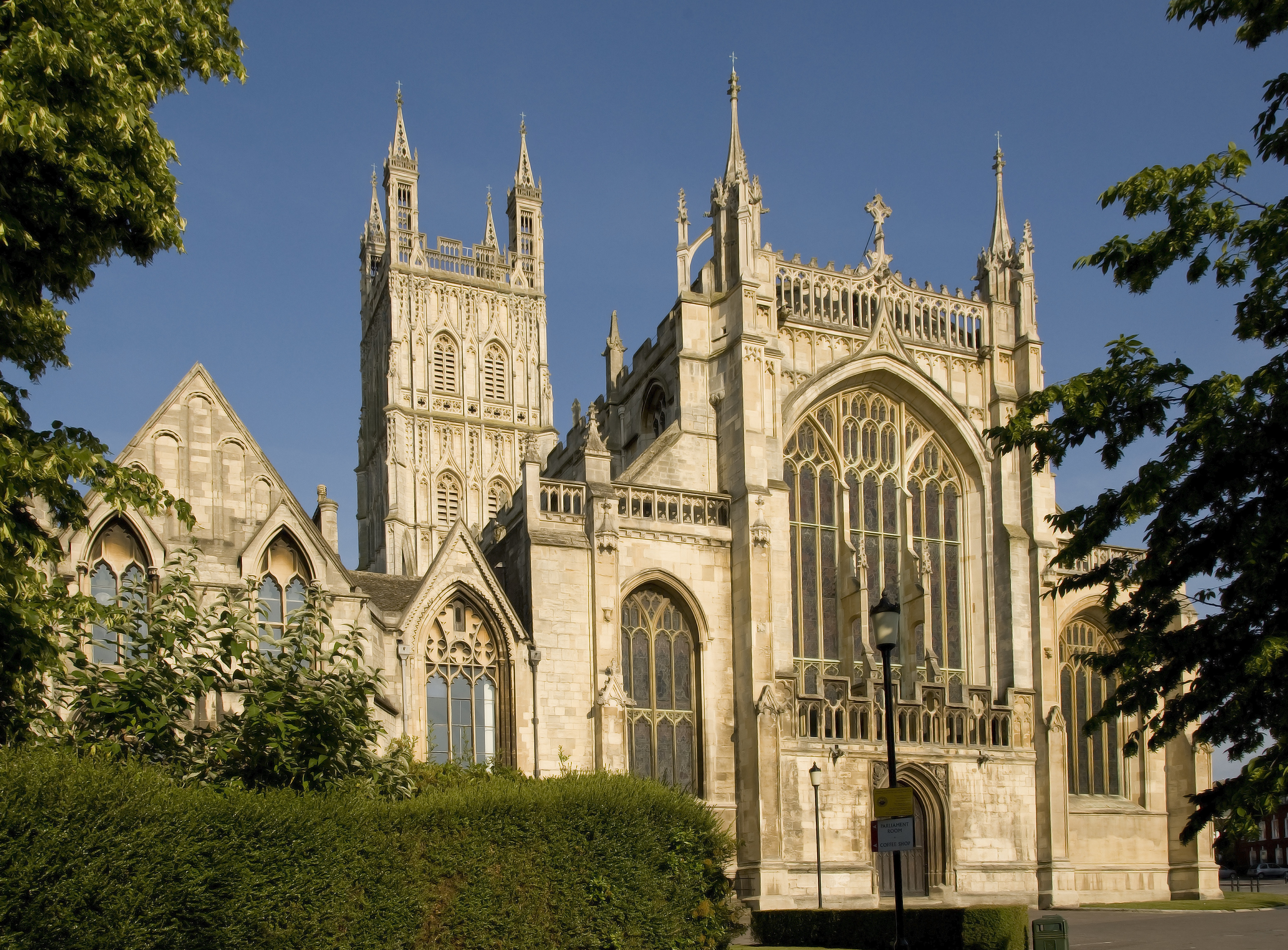
Gloucester Cathedral is one of the locations for the Three Counties Festival.

The Three Counties of England are traditionally the three agrarian counties of Gloucestershire, Herefordshire and Worcestershire.

Including towns and cities such as Worcester, Gloucester, Cheltenham, Hereford, Leominster, Evesham, Malvern and Kidderminster, they extend from the southern boundaries of Birmingham in the north to Bristol in the south. Traditionally rugby union and cricket playing areas, there is a Three Counties Showground situated in the Worcestershire town of Malvern that holds an annual agricultural show, and the area is also referred to in the names of local businesses and in the Three Counties Cider and Perry Association – the popular apple and pear derived alcoholic beverages, many of which are made in this area.

The Three Choirs Festival is a festival of sacred choral music which has been held since 1724. It rotates between the three county towns (Worcester, Hereford and Gloucester). It often features music by local composer Edward Elgar.
