= Hellier Stradivarius =

Violin

The Hellier Stradivarius of c. 1679 is a violin made by Antonio Stradivari of Cremona, Italy. It derives its name from the Hellier family, who might well have bought it directly from the luthier himself.

== Ownership ==
The Hellier Stradivarius has had a convoluted ownership history. It seems to have been in the possession of the Hellier family from the beginning of the 18th century. Samuel Hellier, High Sheriff of Staffordshire 1745, probably brought the violin to England. However, two Cremona violins are first mentioned in the will of his uncle in 1719 and all formed part of a longstanding collection that was kept in the family until 1880.

In that year, The violin was sold by Colonel Thomas Shaw-Hellier, commandant of the Royal Military School of Music, to George Crompton of Manchester, who, in 1885, sold it to the Hill firm on behalf of Dr. Charles Oldham of Brighton, a medical man with violin-playing talent. Shaw-Hellier repurchased the violin in 1890. Upon his death in 1910, his nephew sold the violin back to the Hill firm, who in turn sold it to Oscar Bondy de of Vienna. Bondy kept it until 1925 when he sold it to the Hills for £5,000. Hill then sold it to H. E. Morris of Newmarket, formerly editor of the Shanghai Daily News; upon his death in 1944, it was sold to Rembert Wurlitzer Co., the famous New York violin dealer, yet again through the Hill firm.

In 1956, Wurlitzer sold the violin to Henry Hottinger of New York, who then sold it to Wurlitzer's daughter in 1965. She kept it until 1979, when it was sold to Thomas M. Roberts of Memphis, through another dealer, Alfredo Halegua of the Violin Gallery in Washington, D.C. In 1998 Roberts sold the violin through Halegua to Dr. Herbert R. Axelrod, the ichthyologist and publishing entrepreneur later jailed for tax fraud. Axelrod died in 2017 in Zurich (Switzerland). The violin is now held by his and his wife's estate.

== Quality ==
A. Philips Hill has called this violin "one of the finest Stradivaris in existence".

"During his career, Stradivari is believed to have built about 1,100 instruments, with only about a dozen of them embellished with intricate patterns of inlaid wood and other delicate accoutrements. Of the decorated instruments that exist today, the Hellier [...] is the best preserved, Smithsonian curators said."

It was loaned to the Smithsonian Institution from 1998 until 2003. It was consigned to the Stradivari Foundation in Cremona until 2020 as part of its "Friends of Stradivari" project, where it is on display at the Museo del violino.

== See also ==
- List of Stradivarius instruments
- Axelrod quartet
