= Geraint Bowen (musician) =

British conductor and organist

Geraint Bowen (born in London, 11 January 1963) is a British conductor and organist. He was Organist and Director of Music at Hereford Cathedral from 2001 to 2026.

== Early life and education ==
Bowen is a son of the Welsh tenor Kenneth Bowen (1932–2018) and the brother of the arts administrator Meurig Bowen.

As a boy, Bowen was a chorister at St John-at-Hampstead Church in London, under the direction of Martindale Sidwell. He graduated from Jesus College, Cambridge, where he was organ scholar from 1982 to 1985 and from where he started his conducting career and recorded an LP of early music with the Choir of Jesus College.

== Career ==
In 1986 Bowen was appointed assistant organist at St Patrick's Cathedral, Dublin. While in Dublin he took the external MusB degree at Trinity College.

In 1989 Bowen was appointed Assistant Organist at Hereford Cathedral.

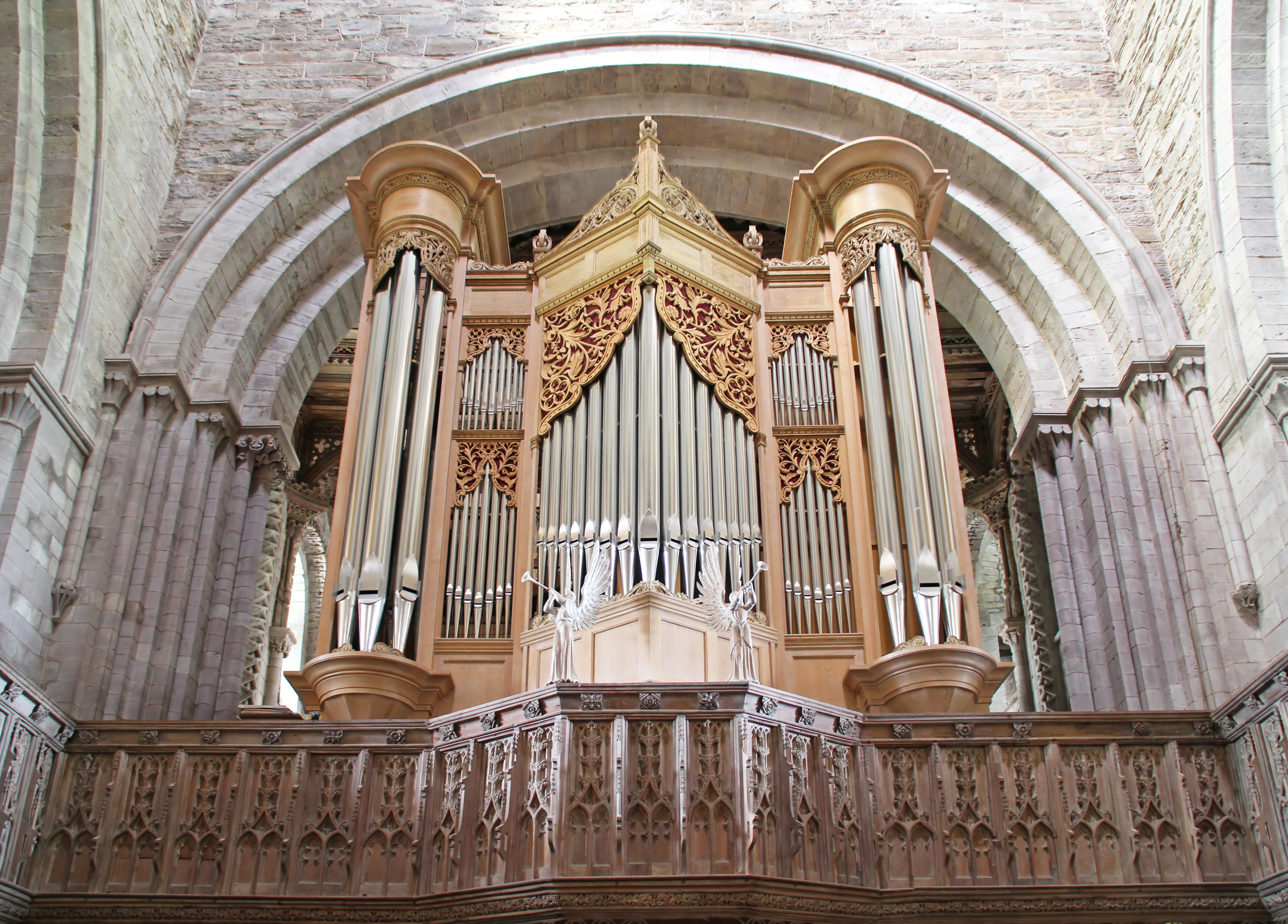
St Davids Cathedral organ, rebuilt under Bowen's supervision

In 1995 Bowen was appointed organist and Master of the Choristers at St Davids Cathedral in Wales, and artistic director of the St Davids Cathedral Festival. While at St Davids, he oversaw the re-building of the cathedral's Father Willis organ by Harrison & Harrison, a major project which was completed in 2000.

Bowen was Organist and Director of Music of Hereford Cathedral from 2001 to 2026. He is also conductor of the Hereford Choral Society and artistic director of the Hereford Three Choirs Festival.

With the choirs of St Davids Cathedral and Hereford Cathedral he has toured the US and Australia; he has also directed choral workshops and courses in the US, including three for the Royal School of Church Music. With the Hereford choir, he recorded a CD of Anthems, Motets & Services by William Byrd and directed what was probably the cathedral's first performance of John Browne's Stabat mater.

== Discography ==
- Aeternae Laudis Lilium (Abbey, 1985) − conducting the Choir of Jesus College, Cambridge
- Psalms of David Vol. 1 Hear My Prayer O Lord (Priory, 1989) − organist accompanying the Choir of Hereford Cathedral
- Howells From Hereford (Regent, 2009) - conducting the Choir of Hereford Cathedral
- William Byrd: Anthems, Motets & Services (Griffin, 2010) - conducting the Choir of Hereford Cathedral
- Christmas From Hereford (Regent, 2012) - conducting the Choir of Hereford Cathedral
- Easter Day at Hereford (Regent, 2016) - conducting the Choir of Hereford Cathedral

Cultural offices
Preceded by Kerry Beaumont	Organist and Master of the Choristers, St Davids Cathedral; 1995−2001	Succeeded by Timothy Noon
Preceded by Roy Massey	Organist and Master of the Choristers of Hereford Cathedral; 2001−2026	Succeeded by Andrew Reid
