= Three Choirs Festival =

Annual music festival held in England

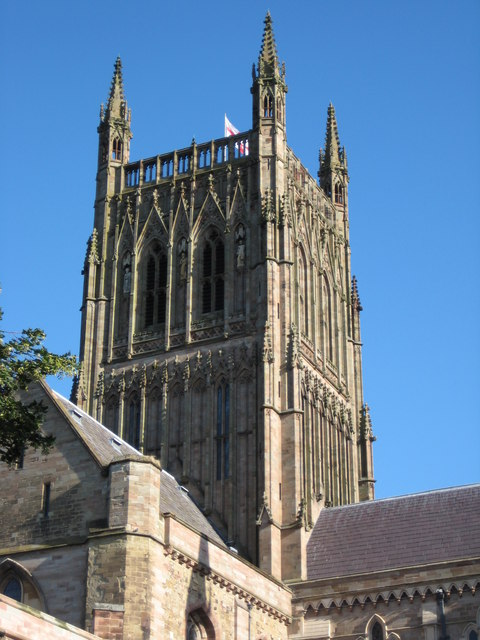
Worcester Cathedral

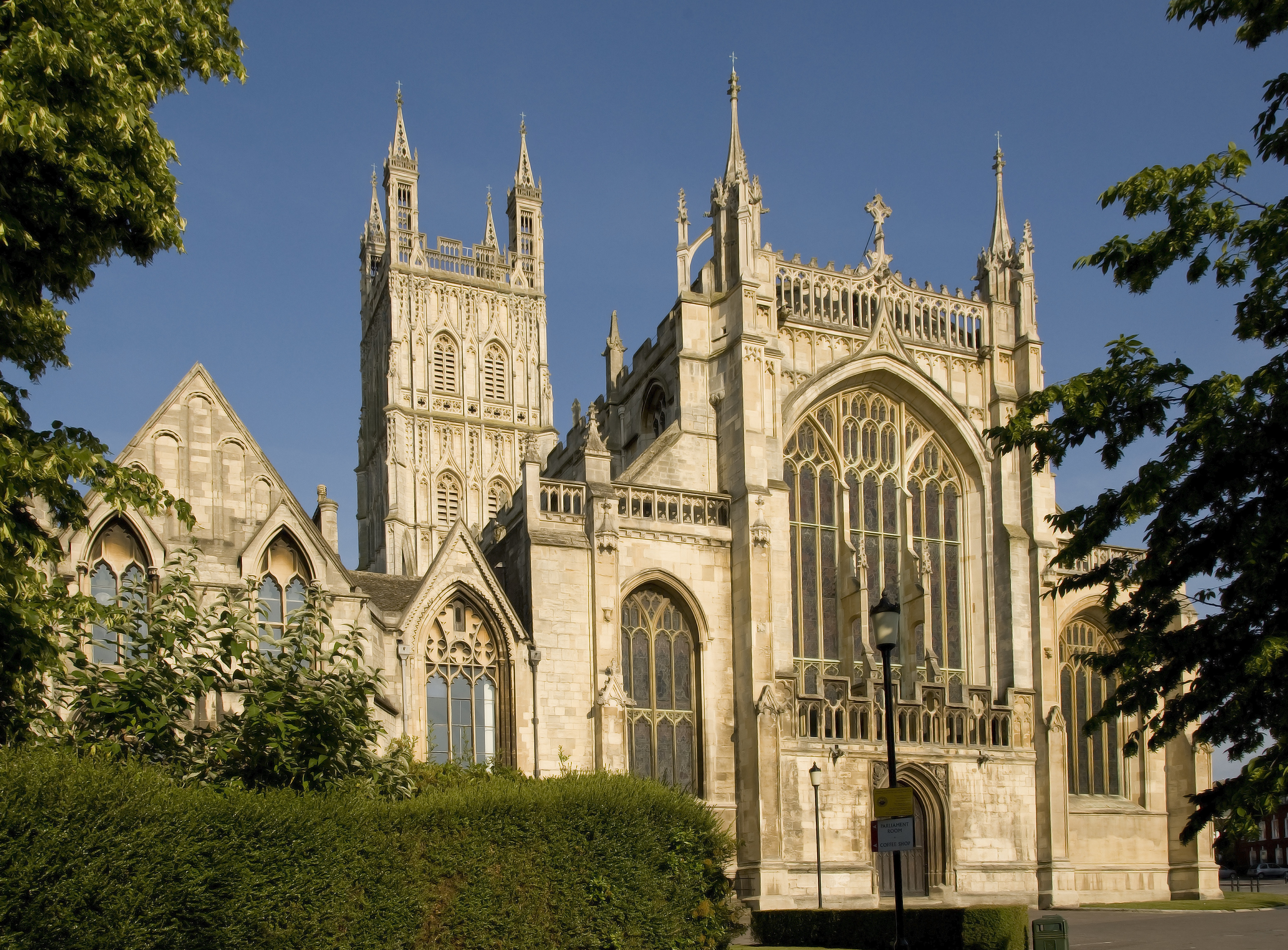
Gloucester Cathedral

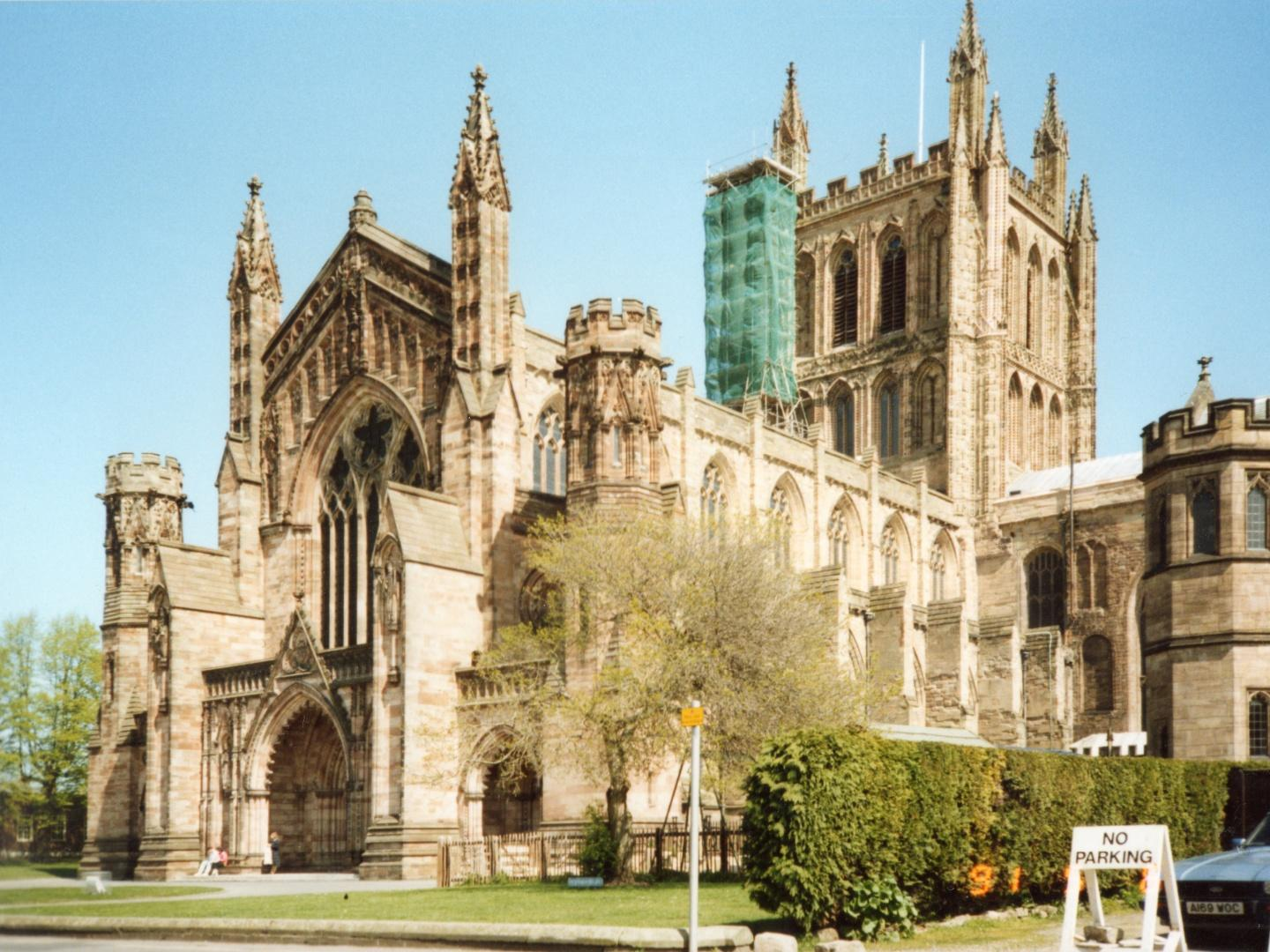
Hereford Cathedral

The Three Choirs Festival is a music festival held annually at the end of July, rotating among the cathedrals of the Three Counties (Hereford, Gloucester, and Worcester) and originally featuring their three choirs, which remain central to the week-long programme. The large-scale choral repertoire is now performed by the Festival Chorus, but the festival also features other major ensembles and international soloists. The 2011 festival took place in Worcester from 6 to 13 August. The 2012 festival in Hereford took place earlier than usual, from 21 to 28 July, to avoid clashing with the 2012 Summer Olympics. The event is now established in the last week of July. The 300th anniversary of the original Three Choirs Festival was celebrated during the 2015 festival, which took place from 25 July to 1 August in Hereford (the landmark 300th meeting of the Three Choirs does not fall until after 2027 due to there being no Three Choirs Festivals for the duration of both World War I and World War II and COVID-19. The 2023 Festival took place in Gloucester from 22 to 29 July.

The festival is closely identified with the musical careers of British composers Edward Elgar and Ralph Vaughan Williams. The organists of the three cathedrals (who act as artistic director and festival conductor when it is their cathedral's turn to host the festival) are Geraint Bowen (Hereford), Adrian Partington (Gloucester), and Samuel Hudson (Worcester).

== History ==
The Three Choirs Festival is the oldest extant music festival in Europe. Originally called the Annual Music Meeting of the Three Choirs, the first is believed to have been held in Gloucester in 1715. Publicity for it in 1719 addressed "Members of the yearly Musical Assembly in these parts". Its music obviously tended towards the ecclesiastical. In early gatherings, Purcell's setting of the Te Deum and Jubilate was a regular part of the repertoire until 1784, and Handel dominated 18th-century programmes with oratorios such as Alexander's Feast, Samson, Judas Maccabaeus, and Messiah. Sir Samuel Hellier, guardian of the Hellier Stradivarius, was a "prominent figure". Haydn's The Creation was heard first in the festival of 1800. From 1840, Mendelssohn's Elijah was performed every year until 1930.

The 19th century saw the introduction of Rossini, Mozart, and Beethoven, and the festival's fortunes were enhanced by the arrival of the railways. However, these also brought crowds, a phenomenon not always pleasing to the church authorities, although full seats uplifted the finances. In the 1870s, the festival was reduced to the three cathedral choirs, ending for a while the era of the visiting celebrity singer as a faction in the church sought to stress the "appropriate" nature of activities allowed in cathedrals. However, the civil authorities took issue with the ecclesiastical and the festival revived. Works by J. S. Bach were not heard until the 1870s, soon to be followed by local (Worcestershire-born) composer Edward Elgar, who began to be featured around the turn of the century and whose works dominated the festival for much of the 20th century as its emphasis shifted toward British musicians. Herbert Sumsion, organist at Gloucester between 1928 and 1967, particularly helped to promote the works of native composers, including premiering works of Howells, Finzi, and others. Parry's compositions were also performed regularly. His De Profundis was one of the earliest works to be commissioned especially for the festival and performed in 1891.

Delius in 1901 was another composer who introduced or conducted new works, with his Dance Rhapsody No. 1. Another was Ralph Vaughan Williams, whose Fantasia on a Theme by Thomas Tallis was premiered there in 1910, followed by the Five Mystical Songs in 1911 and the Fantasia on Christmas Carols in 1912, after which he co-featured with Elgar as a central prop to the musical repertoire. Sumsion fostered a relationship with Hungarian composer Zoltán Kodály and programmed Kodály's works at six Gloucester festivals. Other names include Gustav Holst, Arthur Sullivan, Herbert Howells, Gerald Finzi, William Walton, Arthur Bliss, and Benjamin Britten and recently, Lennox Berkeley, John McCabe, William Mathias, Paul Patterson, and James MacMillan.

A timeline of some of the more significant events in the festival's history from 1709 until the present day has been compiled by Anthony Boden.

In 1996, a Festival Society was established to provide a means for enthusiasts to actively participate in support for the Three Choirs Festival. The festival is funded by ticket sales, donations and sponsorships.

In 2010, the Three Choirs Festival Youth Choir was formed. Made up of singers aged 16–25, it has performed at every festival since then, under a variety of conductors. In 2012 in Hereford the Three Choirs Festival Youth Choir premiered Centuries of Meditation, a setting by Dobrinka Tabakova of words by Thomas Traherne.

The Philharmonia Orchestra began a rolling three-year formal residency at the festival in 2012.

In July 2019, it was reported that the programming of Beethoven's Ode to Joy for the finale of the festival had prompted anger amongst Brexiteers, due to its use as the Anthem of Europe. The concert, unlike the other major musical events at the festival, did not sell out.

In 2021, the Festival included the première of Steve Elcock's Eighth Symphony.

The 2026 festival was held in Gloucester from 25 July to 1 August. It was the first major festival to use Gloucester Cathedral's newly refurbished organ, which featured in several performances during the week

== See also ==
- List of music festivals in the United Kingdom
- Percy Hull, who revived the festival after World War II
