= Rodbaston =

Village in England

Coordinates: 52.709°N 2.120°W

- A449 near Rodbaston

- Location within Staffordshire
- District: South Staffordshire
- Shire county: Staffordshire
- Region: West Midlands
- Country: England
- Sovereign state: United Kingdom
- Post town: Stafford
- Postcode district: ST21
- Dialling code: 01785
- Police: Staffordshire
- Fire: Staffordshire
- Ambulance: West Midlands
- UK Parliament: Stafford

Rodbaston is a village in Staffordshire, England. The population as taken at the 2011 census can be found under Penkridge. It is the location of a campus of South Staffordshire College.
