= Royal Military School of Music =

British Army musical school for its 14 regular bands

Coordinates: 51.4551°N 0.3507°W

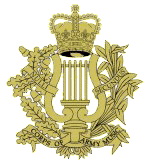
- Active: 1857 – present
- Country: United Kingdom
- Branch: British Army
- Type: Training
- Role: Teaching music

The Royal Military School of Music (RMSM) trains musicians for the British Army's fourteen regular bands, as part of the Royal Corps of Army Music. For more than a century and a half, from 1857 until August 2021, the school was based at Kneller Hall in Twickenham.

Today, the Royal Military School of Music has two branches:

- "initial trade training" takes place at HMS Nelson in Portsmouth (at a shared facility with the Royal Marines School of Music);
- "subsequent trade training" takes place at Gibraltar Barracks, Minley.

RMSM is now part of the Royal School of Military Engineering Group.

== History ==
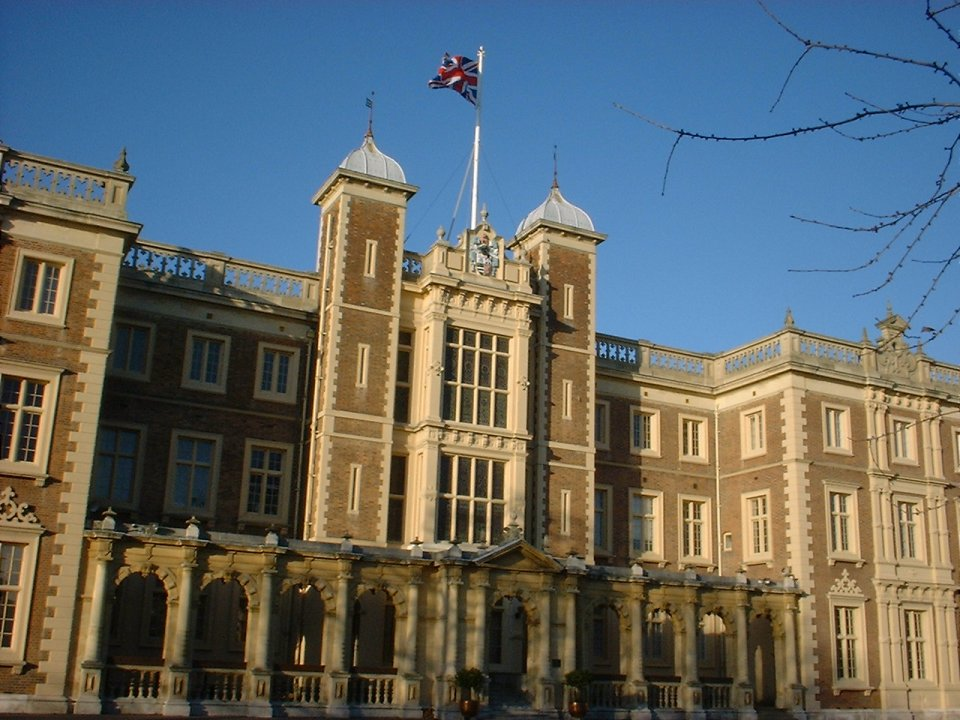
Kneller Hall

The RMSM was established in 1857 at the instigation of Prince George, Duke of Cambridge, who was Queen Victoria's cousin and commander-in-chief of the army. In 1854, during the Crimean War, he attended a parade in Scutari, Turkey to celebrate the Queen's birthday, when about 20 British Army bands on parade were required to combine in a performance of the national anthem. The custom at this time was for regiments to hire civilian bandmasters, each of whom had free rein in their band's instrumentation and arrangements. With each band playing God Save the Queen simultaneously in different instrumentations, pitches, arrangements and key signatures, the result was an embarrassing and humiliating cacophony. The Duke decided there should be some standardisation in army music, and so formed the RMSM, with Henry Schallehn (who also became the first director of music at the Crystal Palace) as commandant.

It was established at Kneller Hall, which had been the country house of the court painter Sir Godfrey Kneller and was rebuilt after a fire in 1848. For several years in the late 19th century, the commandant was Colonel T. B. Shaw-Hellier, owner of the Hellier Stradivarius. In 1920, Colonel J A C Somerville succeeded his elder brother Cameron as commandant and sought to modernize the military music repertoire with new works, such as Vaughan Williams' English Folk Suite (1923) and Toccata Marziale (1924) and Gordon Jacob's William Byrd Suite (1923). He pointed out that while civilian taste in music had improved under the influence of Sir Henry Wood, there had been less progress inside the military:

We in the army have been content to continue in the old rut, croaking to one another like frogs in a pond - damned impenetrable from the mainstream of progress - and continuing to regard the overture to William Tell, Zampa and other such rococo claptrap as the summit of ambition for the band to play or the soldier to appreciate.

In 1937 the school commissioned a new set of custom-made fanfare trumpets, designed by Lt-Col. Hector Adkins (Director of Music 1923–1941), along with a matching set of valved trombones. First appearing at the Coronation of King George VI that year, the Kneller Hall Trumpeters went on to be a regular feature of state occasions and national celebrations throughout the 20th century. A distinctive banner, designed for the School by Kruger Gray, was hung from each instrument and made the trumpeters very recognisable: it consisted of a shield displaying three clarions beneath a crown.

In August 2021 the Headquarters of the Royal Corps of Army Music (which had been established at Kneller Hall in 1994) moved to Gibraltar Barracks in Minley, and soon afterwards the school itself moved to Portsmouth. Once vacated, the building was sold.

== Present day ==
In November 2023 the Princess Royal opened a new combined training facility at Portsmouth for the Royal Marines Band Service and the Royal Corps of Army Music, which has been named the Alford Schools of Military Music. It is located in the former Military Detention Quarters at HMS Nelson, which have served as the Royal Marines School of Music since 1996; the former cells provide a rehearsal space for each individual musician. It can accommodate up to a hundred musicians; on opening there was a 60% Royal Marine, 40% Army personnel split.

RMSM recruits are auditioned before joining the Army. After completing basic training, they spend (on average) a year at Portsmouth. As well as developing their skills and receiving individual instrument tuition (from civilian as well as military musicians), time is spent 'incorporating the values and ethos of the British Army and the Royal Corps of Army Music whilst learning repertoire and skills required in military ensembles (such as marching while playing an instrument)'.

The 'Kneller Wing' at Minley is used for the British Army Bandmaster Course: each year 'a small number of high-calibre musicians' are selected from across the Royal Corps of Army Music to receive the academic, musical and leadership training required for appointment as a Bandmaster.

== Museum of Army Music ==
The Museum of Army Music, which was at Kneller Hall for several decades, had a collection of instruments, music, banners, medals, model bands, documents, prints, manuscripts, paintings and uniforms illustrating the history of military music. As at October 2021 it is in storage pending a new location.

== See also ==
- List of music museums
