= Kneller Hall =

Residential building in the London Borough of Richmond upon Thames, England

Coordinates: 51°27′18″N 0°21′3″W

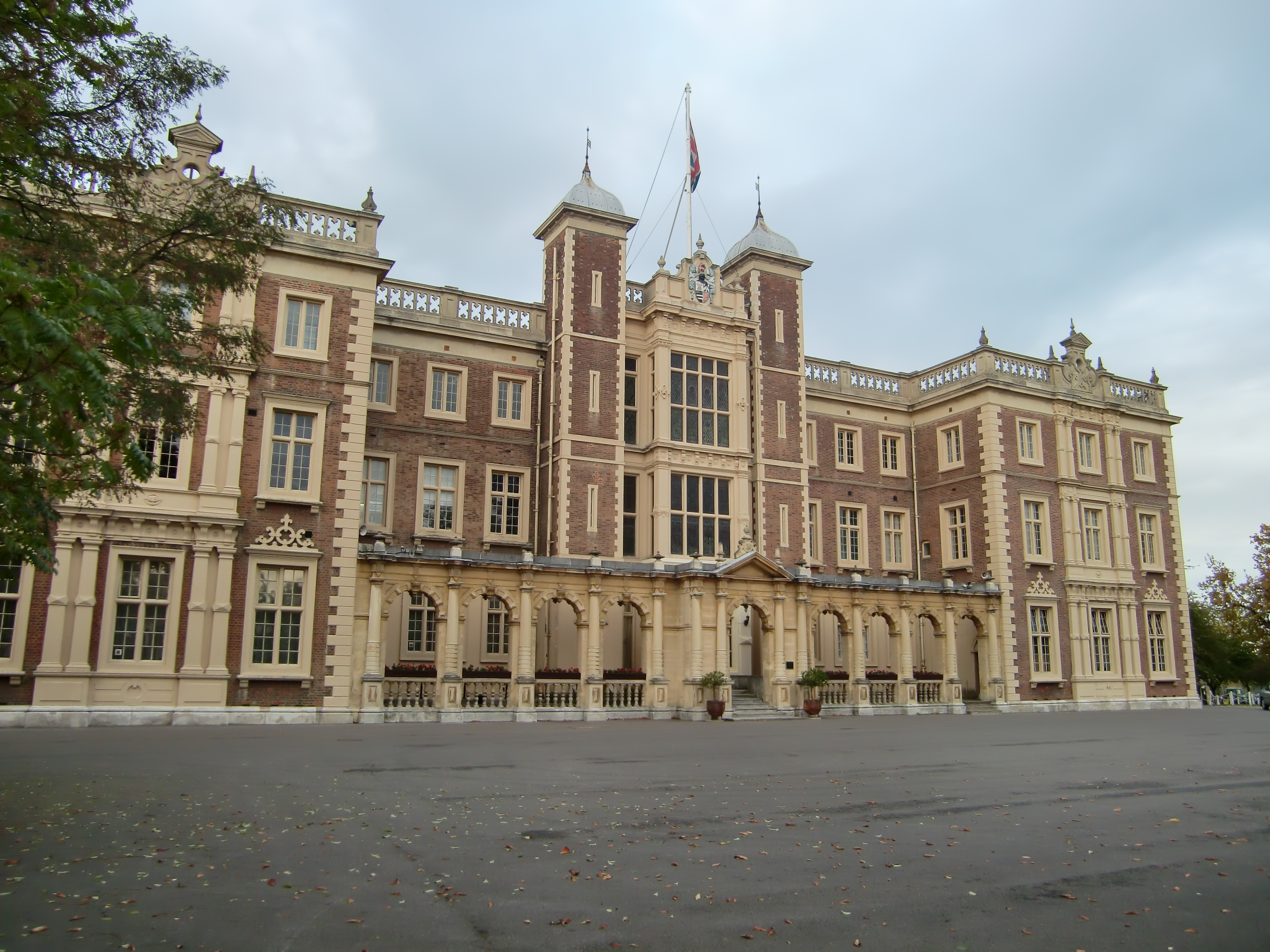
- Kneller Hall, autumn 2009

General information
- Type: Residential
- Location: Whitton, in the London Borough of Richmond upon Thames, England

Listed Building – Grade II
- Official name: Kneller Hall and Boundary Walls, Royal College of Music
- Designated: 25 June 1983
- Reference no.: 1065380

Kneller Hall is a Grade II listed mansion in Whitton, in the London Borough of Richmond upon Thames. It housed the Royal Military School of Music, training musicians for the British Army, which acquired the building in the mid-19th century. It was also home to the school's Museum of Army Music. The Army vacated the site on 31 August 2021.

== History and architecture ==
The first house on the site was built by Edmund Cooke between 1635 and 1646 and in 1664 was the fourth-largest house in Twickenham.

In 1709, the property was purchased by Sir Godfrey Kneller, court painter to British monarchs from Charles II to George I. He had the original house demolished and replaced by a new building, reputedly designed by Sir Christopher Wren. This second house was known as Whitton Hall, after the village, but was renamed by Kneller's widow in memory of her husband. In 1757, the house was sold to Sir Samuel Prime, a prominent London lawyer, who, with his son of the same name, extended it significantly and landscaped the grounds. After Samuel Prime junior died in 1813, the hall was sold to Charles Calvert, Whig MP for Southwark from 1812 to 1832. He further expanded the house (to designs by Philip Hardwick), adding drawing rooms at the east and west ends of the building. Calvert died of cholera in 1832 and his widow inhabited it until her death about 1845. The house was then acquired by the government as a teacher training college, but it needed substantial reconstruction.

By 1850, much of the Wren bulk of the house had become dilapidated and so was demolished. The Hardwick additions were preserved to form the wings of the new house, designed by George Mair. This third building on the site, which still stands today, is stone-corniced, casemented and constructed as to its ground floor central range and otherwise built of red bricks, all in the neo-Jacobethan style suitable to 19th and 20th century mansions of its scale. It consists of 17 bays, the central of which is the widest and of stained glass and the two adjacent of which are arrow-slit windows. The bays are split into five recessed or projecting ranges. Two square pavilion towers form the near left and right bays, each tower crowned by a stone and leaded ogee-shaped cupola. Its gatepiers and house are separately listed by Historic England at Grade II.

== Functions ==
From 1850 to 1856 Kneller Hall served as a teacher training college under principal Frederick Temple and vice-principal Francis Turner Palgrave, known for his poetry anthology Palgrave's Golden Treasury. In exchange for a two-year college education almost entirely subsidised by the state – one of the first forms of state-sponsored social mobility – graduates of the college were supposed to teach pauper and delinquent boys in specially built district schools. Though Kneller Hall itself was generously funded by the state, the larger scheme to build district schools never came to fruition owing to political and religious conflict (see Newcastle Commission). The college closed when it was unable to attract any more students, who were now expected to teach in miserable conditions in Britain's workhouses.

On 3 March 1857 the building was taken over by the War Office as the base for a school for army bandsmen; it then evolved into the Royal Military School of Music. During the Second World War the site was briefly the headquarters of the Commander-in-Chief, Home Forces from late 1939 until the headquarters moved out to St Paul's School in July 1940.

On 18 January 2016 defence minister Mark Lancaster announced that Kneller Hall was one of 12 Ministry of Defence (MoD) sites proposed to be sold as part of the MoD's drive for greater efficiency. In November 2016 the MoD announced that the site would close in 2020. This was later extended to 31 August 2021.

In September 2021, Dukes Education announced it had purchased Kneller Hall as a new site for Radnor House School, Twickenham. Richmond upon Thames Council approved the redevelopment in 2025, and construction began that autumn. In September 2026, Radnor House School and Radnor House Prep were renamed Kneller Hall School, an all through independent co-educational school for pupils aged 4 to 18. The senior school was due to move to the Kneller Hall estate in September 2027, and Kneller Hall Junior School was due to move to Pope's Villa, the senior school's former site, at the same time.
