= Harry Lees (English footballer) =

English footballer (1900–1966)

Personal information
- Full name: Harry Hamilton Lees
- Date of birth: 11 May 1900
- Place of birth: Clapham, England
- Date of death: 14 January 1966 (aged 65)
- Place of death: Birches Bridge, Staffordshire
- Height: 5 ft 8 1/2 in (1.74 m)
- Position: Forward

Senior career*
| Years | Team | Apps | (Gls) |
| 19??–1922 | Woodthorpe (Nottinghamshire) | | |
| 1922–1923 | Ebbw Vale | | |
| 1923–1927 | Wolverhampton Wanderers | 120 | (40) |
| 1927–1929 | Darlington | 54 | (20) |
| 1929–1930 | Shrewsbury Town | | |
| 1930–1931 | Stourbridge | | |
| 1931–1932 | Leamington Town | | |
- * Club domestic league appearances and goals

Harry Hamilton Lees (11 May 1900 – 14 January 1966) was an English footballer who scored 60 goals from 174 appearances in the Football League playing at centre forward or inside left for Wolverhampton Wanderers and Darlington in the 1920s. He also played non-league football for clubs including Woodthorpe, Ebbw Vale, Shrewsbury Town, Stourbridge and Leamington Town.

== Life and career ==
Harry Hamilton Lees was born on 11 May 1900 in Clapham, (Note: Joyce's Players' Records (2004) lists Nottingham as place of birth. Although Lees was raised in the Nottingham area, primary and more recent secondary sources confirm his birth was registered in the Wandsworth district of London, and he himself said he was born in Clapham, which is within that district.) the son of Matthew Lees, a commercial traveller for a glass manufacturing company, and his wife Edith. When Lees was three, the family moved to West Bridgford, Nottinghamshire, where he attended West Bridgford Higher Grade School, captained the football and cricket teams, and qualified to work in a chartered accountant's office after leaving school. He played for Woodthorpe of the Midland Amateur Alliance. A chance invitation to take part in a charity match led to a move to Ebbw Vale of the Southern League Welsh Section. He agreed to this move only because the club's manager, Ike Waterall, "promis[ed him] a business position as well as a playing position."

He became a prolific goalscorer. In February 1923, when he joined Wolverhampton Wanderers of the Football League Second Division, he was reported as "one of the most promising players spotted for many years ... [who] has scored 42 goals in four months, including four hat tricks and four goals in a match twice." He made his first-team debut away to Bradford City on 10 February, a 1–1 draw, and appeared twice more during the remainder of the season as Wolves were relegated to the Third Division North. Lees was a regular starter during the 1923–24 season, when Wolves finished as Second Division champions; he was the team's top scorer with 21 goals, including a run of 12 in seven matches (14 in ten) that featured hat-tricks against Wrexham and New Brighton.

He continued as a regular starter during the 1924–25 Second Division, contributing nine goals as the team finished sixth, and remained with the club for three more seasons, although he played less frequently. He was placed on the transfer list in October 1926, drawing interest from First Division club Derby County but terms were not agreed. Lees played occasionally for the senior team in the second half of the season. Replacing the injured Wilf Chadwick for the FA Cup fifth round tie against Hull City, he scored the only goal of the game, a fortunate one that resulted from a rebound after his shot deflected off a defender as Hull players appealed for handball. He played in the first five matches of September 1927 before a leg injury forced him out, and he never regained his place.

In October 1927, Lees signed for Third Division North club Darlington. He scored 15 league goals for the remainder of the season as the team failed to regain their Second Division status. In January 1928, both he and Tom Ruddy scored hat-tricks in a 9–2 win against Lincoln City that remained Darlington's record Football League victory. He scored 5 goals in 26 matches in 1928–29 before ending his Football League career.

Lees returned to Wolverhampton, where his wife, Evelyn, had a hairdressing business, and signed for Birmingham & District League club Shrewsbury Town in July 1929. He spent the 1930–31 season with another Birmingham League club, Stourbridge, and was reported to have scored 20 goals for them. He spent his final season with Birmingham Combination club Leamington Town, providing experience to the team.

He was reported to have turned down offers from Football League clubs because of his involvement in the hairdressing business. The 1939 Register lists Evelyn as a ladies' hairdresser, while Lees is an unemployed clerk. He was later employed as works accountant for a company in Tipton, and retained an active interest in Wolverhampton Wanderers until illness intervened a couple of years before his death. Lees died at his home in Birches Bridge, Codsall, Staffordshire, on 14 January 1966 at the age of 65.

== Career statistics ==
Appearances and goals by club, season and competition
| Club | Season | League | | | FA Cup | | Total | |
| Club | Season | Division | Apps | Goals | Apps | Goals | Apps | Goals |
|---|---|---|---|---|---|---|---|---|
| Wolverhampton Wanderers | 1922–23 | Second Division | 3 | 0 | 0 | 0 | 3 | 0 |
| Wolverhampton Wanderers | 1923–24 | Third Division North | 40 | 21 | 5 | 1 | 45 | 22 |
| Wolverhampton Wanderers | 1924–25 | Second Division | 39 | 12 | 2 | 0 | 41 | 12 |
| Wolverhampton Wanderers | 1925–26 | Second Division | 21 | 5 | 0 | 0 | 21 | 5 |
| Wolverhampton Wanderers | 1926–27 | Second Division | 12 | 2 | 2 | 2 | 14 | 4 |
| Wolverhampton Wanderers | 1927–28 | Second Division | 5 | 0 | 0 | 0 | 5 | 0 |
| Wolverhampton Wanderers | Total | | 120 | 40 | 9 | 3 | 129 | 43 |
| Darlington | 1927–28 | Third Division North | 28 | 15 | 3 | 1 | 31 | 16 |
| Darlington | 1928–29 | Third Division North | 26 | 5 | 3 | 2 | 29 | 7 |
| Darlington | Total | | 54 | 20 | 6 | 3 | 60 | 23 |
| Career total | | | 106 | 0 | 5 | 0 | 111 | 0 |
