= Codsall Community High School =

Community school in Staffordshire, England

Location
- Elliotts Lane; Codsall, Staffordshire, WV8 1PQ; England; 52°37′48″N 2°11′14″W

Information
- Type: Community school
- Established: 31 May 1940
- Local authority: Staffordshire County Council
- Department for Education URN: 124400 Tables
- Ofsted: Reports
- Headteacher: Simon Maxfield
- Staff: 123
- Gender: Coeducational
- Age: 13 to 18
- Enrolment: 1076
- Houses: Discovery, Challenger, Enterprise, Endeavour
- Website: http://www.cc-hs.com/

Codsall Community High School is a coeducational upper school and sixth form located in Codsall, Staffordshire, England.

It is located near to Wolverhampton. A total of 1017 pupils (including more than 300 sixth formers) attend the school.

== History ==
Codsall High School was opened in May 1940, taking 126 pupils aged 11 and over from the village's school by St Nicholas Church. The school also took pupils from the neighbouring village of Bilbrook. After the war, the school expanded; by 1954, there were 728 children on the roll. An extension was opened in 1957, including the school's present Main Hall. A small swimming pool was constructed in the school's quadrangle in 1964, a roof was added in the 1970s.

The school became an 11-18 Comprehensive in 1969; at the same time, headteacher George Gibbs retired and was replaced by Ron Mitson. A further extension was built in the early 1970s, and the school's catchment area expanded to include the village of Pattingham.

Geoff Bate succeeded as headmaster in September 1972, at the same time that the school's capacity was reduced due to the entry age being increased from 11 to 13 as part of the introduction of three-tier education in the area.

Original plans for a high school in Perton were cancelled, and pupils travelled to Codsall upon completing middle school, leading to a growth in pupil numbers. A community sports centre opened during the mid-1970s, refurbished using National Lottery money from 2003.

Mr Bate retired in 1994, replaced by Mr E. Liddy. A further extension was built around this time. The school's head until the end of the 2014-2015 academic year was Mrs Tunnicliffe, appointed in 2005. Mr Harding was appointed in 2015 and was the headteacher up until the end of the 2020-2021 academic year, and Mr. Maxfield was appointed in September 2022. The school is joined up with two local middle schools (Bilbrook and Perton) making it part of a federation of schools.

In September 2004 it became the first to achieve specialist school status in Maths and Computing and in 2013 was rated good by Ofsted.

In 2006, the school was found to contain asbestos in some classrooms. In 2014, the school’s minibus was involved in a crash that resulted in four children injured and three adults were hurt.

In 2018, the yearly cost for Perton students travelling by bus trebled to more than £600 resulting in protests.

== Curriculum ==
Following the recognition of the school as a specialist in mathematics and computing, the school's focus shifted in the 2000s to the delivery of more ICT and computing courses, as well as vocational qualifications. However, Codsall Community High School offers a wide range of courses, and was the last comprehensive school in South Staffordshire still to offer classical subjects, including Classical Civilisation and Latin, however, these stopped being taught after the year of 2010.

Academic attainment peaked in 2008 when the school achieved record results in GCSE exams with 72% of candidates receiving the top four grades, A*-C. Since then results have fallen steadily, In 2012, 62% of all pupils attained five GCSEs grade A* to C including English and mathematics. This is a decrease of six percentage points since 2011.

A room for the Sixth Form was opened by Sir Patrick Cormack in September 2008, named in memory of former headmaster Geoff Bate. Rock band The Hoosiers visited the community project in October 2008 to support the students and the hard work that they had undertaken.

In 2009, Codsall Community High School extended their curriculum provision by becoming the first state school in the country to run a post-16 Football Academy. The scheme offers students, aged 16–18 years, the opportunity to study for nationally recognised qualifications whilst receiving high quality football coaching daily.

== Notable alumni ==
- Jim Lea (born 1949), member of Slade, perfected his electronic violin skills under the tutelage of Ron Williams
- Sir Paul Tucker (born 1958), former Deputy Governor of the Bank of England
- Bernard O'Mahoney (born 1960), author
- Professor David Leigh FRS (born 1963), Scientist and Fellow of the Royal Society, currently Sir Samuel Hall Chair of Chemistry at the University of Manchester
- Peter Baker (born 1967), Golfer, and member of 1993 Ryder Cup team.
- Gareth Morgan (born 1968), Daily Star Sunday editor
- William Regal (born 1968), WWE Wrestler, real name Darren Matthews
- Christopher Sadler (born 1970), an award-winning Animator Director for Aardman Animations who has worked on Wallace and Gromit, Chicken Run, Cracking Contraptions, Creature Comforts and Shaun the Sheep
- Emma Reynolds (born 1977), Labour Member of Parliament for Wolverhampton North East and for Wycombe & Secretary of State for Environment, Food and Rural Affairs

== Sources ==
- The Story of Codsall and Bilbrook Schools, Codsall and Bilbrook History Society, 1993
