= Christ Church, Wolverhampton =

- Christ Church, Wolverhampton
- 52°35′46″N 2°7′47.7″W
- OS grid reference: SO 91296 99819
- Location: Wolverhampton
- Country: England
- Denomination: Church of England

History
- Dedication: Christ Church

Architecture
- Architect: Edward Banks
- Completed: 1867
- Demolished: 1975

Christ Church, Wolverhampton is a former parish church in the Church of England in Wolverhampton

== History ==
The church was built in 1867 to designs of the local architect Edward Banks. The aisles were added in 1869 and the church was consecrated on 3 November 1870 by the Bishop of Lichfield. The chancel was added in 1887. The chancel was decorated with wall paintings in 1903 by J. Edie Read and Wyndham Hughes. A chapel and vestries were completed in 1906. The tower was never completed.

A parish was assigned out of St Andrew's Church, Wolverhampton on 27 October 1876.

It was made redundant and demolished in 1975 and a Mosque was built on the site.

== Organ ==
The church had a pipe organ by J.W. Walker and Sons. A specification of the organ can be found on the National Pipe Organ Register.
