= Horseley Fields =

Area of Wolverhampton, England

Coordinates: 52.5859°N 2.1199°W

- Location within the West Midlands
- Metropolitan borough: Wolverhampton
- Metropolitan county: West Midlands
- Region: West Midlands
- Country: England
- Sovereign state: United Kingdom
- Post town: Wolverhampton
- Postcode district: WV1
- Dialling code: 01902
- Police: West Midlands
- Fire: West Midlands
- Ambulance: West Midlands
- UK Parliament: Wolverhampton South East

Horseley Fields is an inner city area of Wolverhampton, situated to the east of the city centre, bordering Springfield, Heath Town, Eastfield, Monmore Green and All Saints.

== Place name origins ==
Horseley is from Old English, a conjoint of hors - horse and hlæw - mound, usually associated with a burial mound. Fields was a later addition. Over time, 'hlæw' (low) became 'ley'. The first recorded mention of the place name currently existing was in 1204, as Horselawe.

== History ==
In Elizabethan times, Horseley Field was a field owned by Thomas Leveson and rented out to a farmer. In around 1750, with the eastwards spread of Wolverhampton, St James' Square was built. It consisted of elegant Georgian buildings. In 1857, the Minerva Iron & Steel Works was founded at Lower Horseley Fields by Isaac Jenks. With the late 19th century came increased transport and passing trade, with much of the area, now thriving, consisting of shops. There were several public houses in the area, such as 'The Swan' at the top of Horseley Fields on the corner of Piper's Row, The Wheel Inn on Union Mill Street, the New Inn on the corner of Horseley Fields and Old Mill Street and The Union. A cinema called The Globe existed, as did the Mount Zion Methodist Church opposite, which opened in 1867. In the 1930s, Wulfruna Coal opened on the site of the former Minerva works. Royal Mail had a sorting office in the area, which had a short lived extension in the 1980s (demolished in the 2000s). In the 1970s, and later in the late 1990s and early 2000s, much of the old Horseley Fields area was demolished - first to make way for the Ring Road and bus station, then later for the building of new apartments around Albion Street.

== Today ==
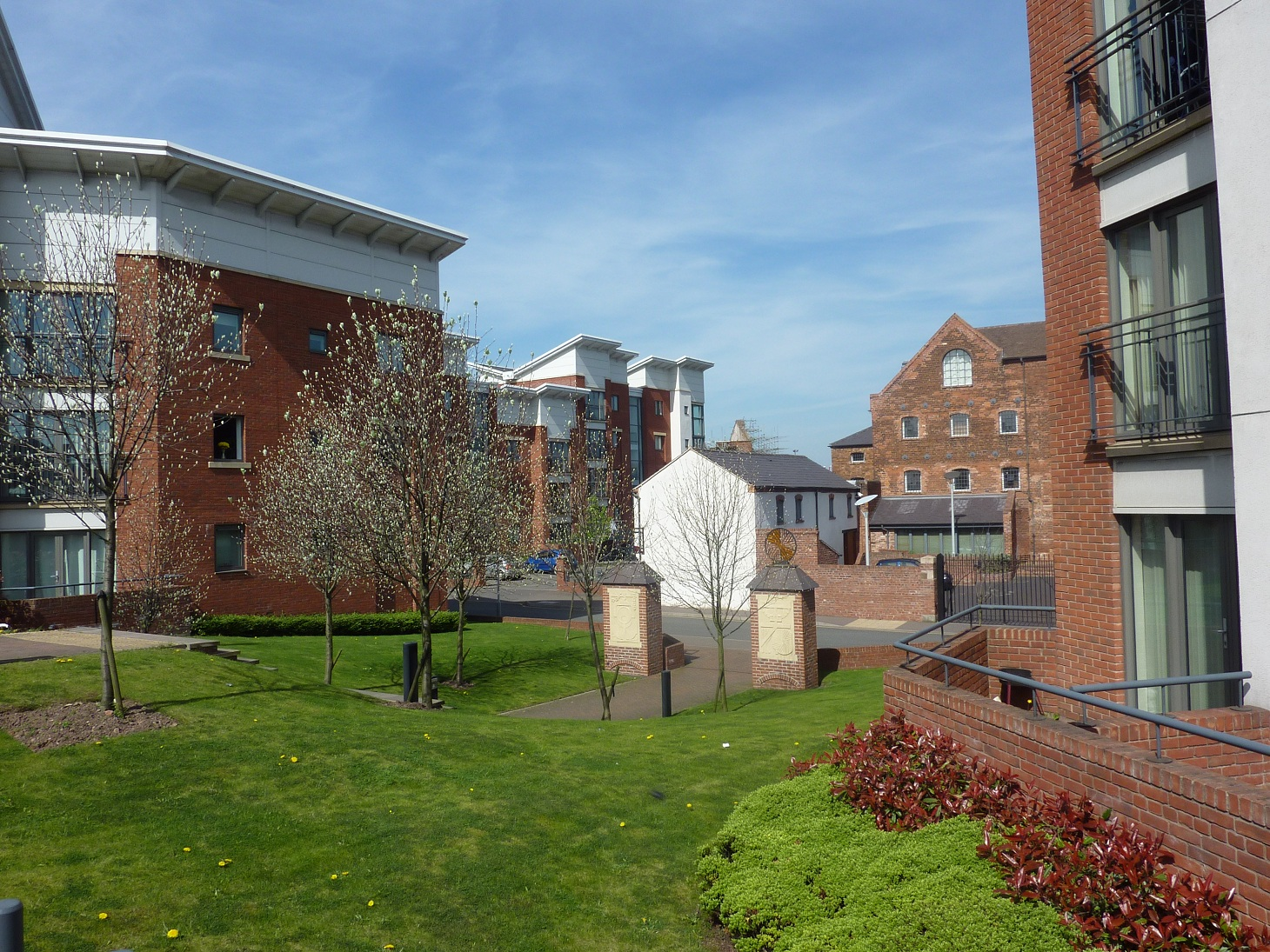
New and old Horseley Fields - here, Albion Street

Not much survives of the old Horseley Fields. The Queen's Building, the High Level Railway Station's original carriage entrance marking the original approach now incorporated into the new transport interchange still exists, as do the Chubb Buildings and Prince Albert public house. There are a few surviving buildings on Union Mill Street, Albion Street and Walsall Street, as well as factory units around Ward Street and St James Street. Wulfruna Coal is still trading on Minerva Wharf / Lower Horseley Fields. The site of St James' Square is no longer recognisable, now the site of the Novotel hotel. Jennings Funeral Directors sits on the corner of Horseley Fields and St James Street, and have existed in the area since 1848. Apartments, built c.2000 line either side of Albion Street. The Chicago Rock Cafe or CRC nightclub is situated in the area, as is Wolverhampton's new bus station on Pipers Row, which opened in 2011. It is on the western edge of the Horseley Fields area, and includes a WH Smith store, Sainsbury's Local and National Express travel shop, as well as a newly opened footbridge providing a fast link to Wolverhampton railway station.

== See also ==
Horseley Fields Junction
