= Edward Banks (architect) =

English architect

Edward Banks JP (1817 – 2 May 1866) was an English architect based in Wolverhampton.

== Life ==
He was a pupil of Charles Fowler. He worked in partnership with George Bidlake for a short period.

As well as being an architect, he served as a town councillor in Wolverhampton and was a member of the Public Works Committee. He additionally served as a Magistrate.

He died on 2 May 1866.

== Works ==
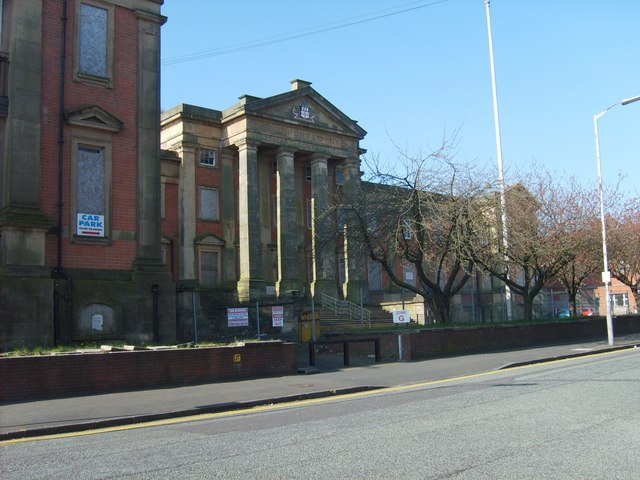
The Royal Hospital, Wolverhampton

- School of Art and Design, Wolverhampton
- Cattle Market, Wolverhampton
- Royal Hospital, Wolverhampton
- Compton Hall, Wolverhampton 1845
- St Nicholas' Church, Codsall, Staffordshire 1846 - 1848
- Queen's Building, Wolverhampton 1849
- St Matthew's Church, Wolverhampton 1849
- Holy Trinity Church, Heath Town 1850 - 1852
- All Saints’ Church, Catfield, Norfolk 1852
- Houses in Brickkiln Street, Wolverhampton 1853
- St Paul's Church, Coven, Staffordshire 1857
- St Milburger’s Church, Beckbury 1857
- St John's Church, Stretton nave and transepts rebuild 1860
- Mander Brothers works, John Street, Wolverhampton rebuilt about 1860
- St Andrew's Church, Wolverhampton 1865
- Christ Church, Wolverhampton 1867
- St Andrew’s Church, Chinnor
