= St Matthew's Church, Wolverhampton =

St Matthew’s Church, Wolverhampton
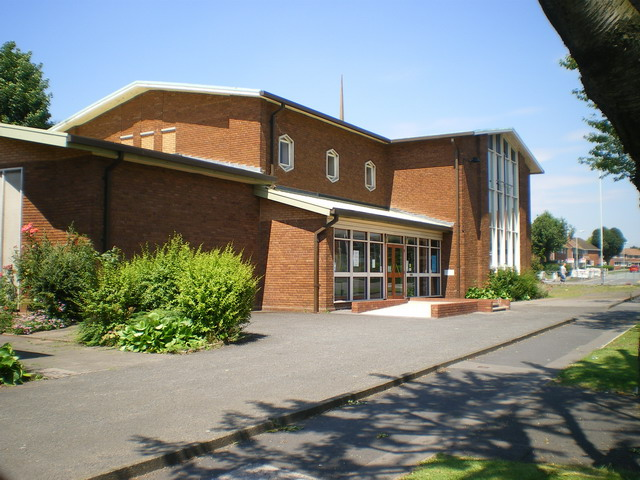
- St Matthew’s Church, Wolverhampton
- St Matthew’s Church, Wolverhampton
- 52°34′57.53″N 2°5′54.75″W
- OS grid reference: SO 93419 98318
- Location: Wolverhampton
- Country: England
- Denomination: Church of England
- Website: stmatthewswolves.com

History
- Dedication: St Matthew

Architecture
- Architect: Peter Brownhill
- Completed: 1969

Administration
- Diocese: Diocese of Lichfield
- Archdeaconry: Walsall
- Deanery: Wolverhampton
- Parish: St Matthew Wolverhampton

St Matthew's Church, Wolverhampton is a parish church in the Church of England in Wolverhampton

== History ==
The first church was built situated in Lower Horseley Fields, at its junction with Lower Walsall Street in 1849 to the designs of architect Edward Banks. It was built by John Cockerill of Wolverhampton and comprised a clerestoried nave with aisles, and a chancel. There was a bell turret on the west gable, and north and south porches in the westernmost bay but one, and a sacristy projecting at right angles from the church. The cost of the building was £3,300 with an additional £1,200 for the land. It was consecrated by the Bishop of Lichfield on 20 November 1849.

It was demolished in 1964 and the new church was designed by Peter Brownhill and built in East Park Way. It opened in 1969.

Bishop Rose Hudson-Wilkin, who later became the bishop of Dover, served as Curate to St. Matthew's parish in the early to mid 1990's immediately after her ordination training.

== Organ ==
The first church had a pipe organ by Nicholson and Lord. A specification of the organ can be found on the National Pipe Organ Register.
