= Tom Barrett (riding mechanic) =

English motor-racing riding mechanic (1891–1924)

- Born: 21 November 1891; Heath Town, England
- Died: 27 September 1924 (aged 32); San Sebastian Grand Prix circuit, Spain
- Cause of death: Crash whilst motor-racing
- Occupation: Motor-racing mechanic
- Employer(s): Guy Motors, Sunbeam
- Spouse: Lillian Ivy (née Worthington-Roberts)

Thomas Barrett (21 November 1891 – 27 September 1924) was an English motor-racing riding mechanic. His death in the 1924 San Sebastian Grand Prix brought an end to the practice of riding mechanics in two-seat racing cars.

Racing in this early period was conducted between unreliable cars over long road courses, rather than by repeated laps of a dedicated short circuit. There was no nearby "pit lane" in which to conduct repairs and so it was necessary to carry a mechanic on board the car.

== Life and early career ==
Barrett was born in 1891, at Prestwood Road, Heath Town, Wolverhampton, one of nine children. His father, George Barrett, had been born in rural Essex but came to Wolverhampton and worked in engineering factories. Tom and his eldest brother William served apprenticeships at the pump-making factory of Joseph Evans & Sons, where their father also worked.

During the First World War, Barrett worked at Guy Motors. Rather than Guy's better-known lorries, this work was on small mechanisms such as fuzes for depth charges. As with Barrett's future driver, Kenelm Lee Guinness, this war-work was sufficiently important to excuse him from military service during the war.

In 1915, Barrett married local girl Lillian Ivy Worthington-Roberts. They moved to Burleigh Road, Wolverhampton, remaining near to Wolverhampton's engineering works. Barrett continued to be an active church-goer and became a member of St. John's Church choir.

In early 1918, Guy began work on aero-engines, planning large orders for the ultimately unsuccessful ABC Wasp and Dragonfly aero-engines. In fact they only managed to produce one complete prototype of each, before the semi-completed production batch was transferred to another factory. After the end of the war, the aero-engine work at Guy was closed. Barrett's appetite for aero-engines had been whetted though and he moved to the nearby Sunbeam works so as to continue it. The market for aero-engines at this time was flooded by war-surplus and so Sunbeam focused on new engines for airships.

By 1921 though, airship accidents made this work less attractive and so Tom moved into Sunbeam's 'Experimental Department', supporting their successful racing cars, including the Sunbeam 350HP. Sunbeam's road cars were highly regarded in this period and the prestige and engineering innovation derived from the racing effort was seen as a significant part of this.

== 1924 accident ==
Sunbeam's works drivers for the Grand Prix were Henry Segrave and Kenelm Lee Guinness. Guinness' usual mechanic, Bill Perkins, had been injured in a crash at Brooklands some weeks earlier, when the driver, Dario Resta, had been killed.

Two mechanics travelled to Spain with Segrave and Guinness, Tom Barrett and the Italian, Marocchi. As Segrave spoke a little Italian, he and Marocchi were in one car, Guinness and Barrett in the other.

September weather for the race day was wet with rain and the track was slippery. There was an attempt to sprinkle sand on the track for extra grip, but the earth from local fields that was used was more clay than sand and actually made things worse.

On the 11th lap Guinness's car hit a rut in the road, which along with the slippery surface, caused him to lose control. The car left the track, spun, rolled, and crossed back over the track before coming to rest. Both occupants were thrown out of the car and into a railway cutting. Barrett was killed instantly. Guinness was a little more fortunate, his fall being broken by some telegraph wires, but was still seriously injured. He never raced again and seemed to have been permanently affected by the crash, culminating in his suicide in 1937.

Segrave was always known for his concern for others in his team, but he was unaware of the accident. After winning the race, he was aghast to discover the fate of his colleagues.

On 16 October 1924, Barrett was buried at Holy Trinity Church, Heath Town, Wolverhampton. Many of his engineering colleagues from Sunbeam, Guy and Joseph Evans attended.

After the accident, Lillian was given a job at Sunbeam. She later worked as an auxiliary nurse at the Wolverhampton Royal Hospital.

== Rule changes ==
After this accident, rules were changed so that mechanics no longer rode in the cars during the race. Barrett's untimely death must thus have saved many lives and injuries in motor racing. However the requirement for two seats in sports car racing classes has been retained to this day.

== Legacy ==
Barrett's granddaughter appeared on the BBC Television programme Antiques Road Show in May 2018, with a suitcase of memorabilia from his racing years.
