= Holy Trinity Church, Heath Town =

Holy Trinity Church, Heath Town, Wolverhampton
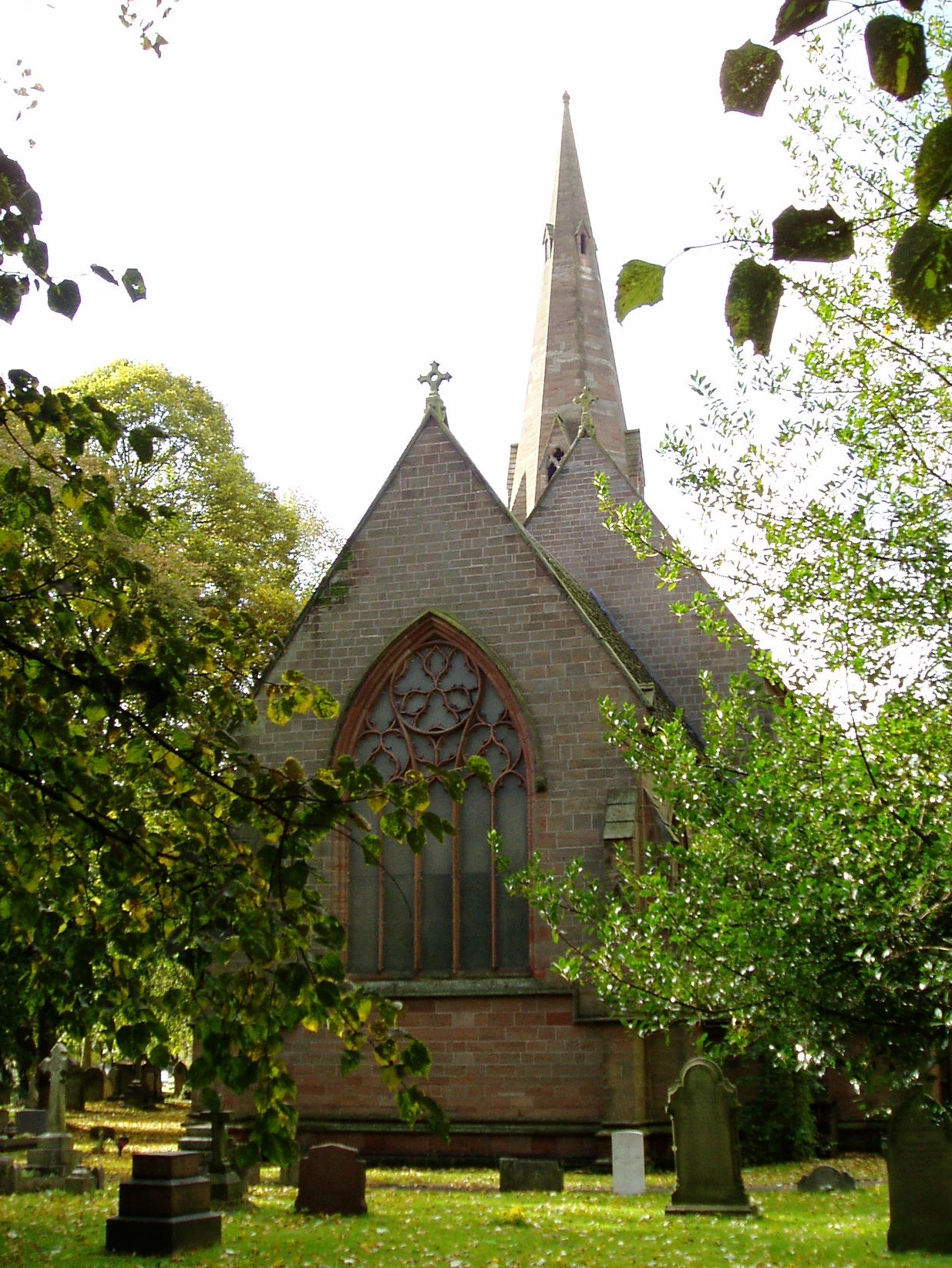
- Holy Trinity Church, Heath Town
- Holy Trinity Church, Heath Town, Wolverhampton
- 52°35′46.57″N 2°6′9.53″W
- OS grid reference: SO 931 998
- Location: Heath Town
- Country: England
- Denomination: Church of England
- Churchmanship: Open evangelical
- Website: www.htht.org.uk

History
- Status: Parish church
- Dedication: The Holy Trinity
- Consecrated: 1852

Architecture
- Functional status: Active
- Heritage designation: Grade II listed
- Architect: Edward Banks
- Architectural type: Decorated Gothic, Gothic Revival
- Groundbreaking: 1849
- Completed: 1852

Specifications
- Length: 121 feet (37 m)
- Width: 55 feet (17 m)
- Height: 140 feet (43 m)
- Materials: Stone and brick Tiled roofs

Administration
- Province: York
- Diocese: Lichfield
- Archdeaconry: Walsall
- Deanery: Wolverhampton
- Parish: Holy Trinity Wednesfield Heath

Clergy
- Vicar: Revd Richard Merrick

Holy Trinity Church, Heath Town, is in Heath Town, a district of Wolverhampton, West Midlands, England. It is an active Anglican parish church in the deanery of Wolverhampton, the archdeaconry of Walsall, and the diocese of Lichfield. The church has been designated by English Heritage as a Grade II listed building.

== History ==
The first church was built between 1850 and 1852 to the 1849 designs of architect Edward Banks. It was consecrated by the Bishop of Lichfield on 22 July 1852.

It comprised a nave and aisles, with north porch and south entrance under the tower. The chancel had an organ chamber on the north side, separated by a stone screen and a vestry. The 6 bay nave was 85 feet (26 m) long and 26 feet (7.9 m) wide. The aisles were 14.5 feet (4.4 m) wide, making the total width 55 feet (17 m). The chancel was 36 feet (11 m) long and 19 feet (5.8 m) wide. The tower was 140 feet (43 m) high. The whole of the exterior and interior is dressed stone and the seats and doors made of oak. The chancel floor was laid with Minton encaustic tiles. It was constructed by G and F Higham of Wolverhampton.

== Interior ==
According to Pevsner Holy Trinity is 'A well-proportioned example of an Ecclesiological church with good interior features.'

== Churchyard ==
The church is surrounded by a large churchyard which is still used for burials. The initial area closest to the church, known as the 'Old Ground', opened with the church in 1852. Since then the churchyard has been extended several times and now covers approximately seven acres in an irregular shape.

Two structures in the churchyard have been designated by English Heritage as a Grade II listed buildings. These are the lych gate which is also a war memorial and dates from c.1920 and the Jacobean style almshouses of c.1850, restored 1996.

=== Graves of historical interest ===
- Daisy Alcock (1903-1996), calligrapher
- Thomas Barrett (1891-1924), English motor-racing riding mechanic
- George Bates (1879-1958), Mayor of Wolverhampton 1941-1942
- 26 war graves from World War I.
- 27 war graves from World War II.
