= Birches Bridge =

Area of Codsall, Staffordshire, England

Coordinates: 52.62383°N 2.18663°W

- Location within Staffordshire
- District: South Staffordshire
- Shire county: Staffordshire
- Region: West Midlands
- Country: England
- Sovereign state: United Kingdom
- Post town: WOLVERHAMPTON
- Postcode district: WV8
- Dialling code: 01902
- Police: Staffordshire
- Fire: Staffordshire
- Ambulance: West Midlands
- UK Parliament: Kingswinford and South Staffordshire

Birches Bridge is an area of Codsall, Staffordshire. It is situated to the northwest of Wolverhampton between Bilbrook and Codsall.

== Name and origins ==
Birches Bridge takes its name from The Birches, a large estate first mentioned in court rolls of 1716 and in a Codsall Parish Register of 1730. The estate stood between the present day Birches Road and Lane Green Road. Birch coming from old English braec or brec, meaning a newly cultivated piece of land.

== Shops and amenities ==
Birches Bridge is home to Bilbrook railway station and Birches Bridge Shopping Centre, which features The Flower Shop which was established when the parade of shops was built in 1956, a co-operative supermarket and an Asda On The Go petrol station amongst other shops and eateries.

== Transport links ==
The area is served by the number 5/X5 bus service from Wolverhampton to Codsall, operated by Banga Buses and Chaserider, and Bilbrook railway station on the Wolverhampton to Shrewsbury line. The railway station was originally known as Birches.
