= Oaken =

Village in Staffordshire, England

Coordinates: 52.621°N 2.228°W

- Location within Staffordshire
- OS grid reference: SJ8502
- Shire county: Staffordshire
- Region: West Midlands
- Country: England
- Sovereign state: United Kingdom
- Post town: Wolverhampton
- Postcode district: WV8
- Police: Staffordshire
- Fire: Staffordshire
- Ambulance: West Midlands

Oaken is a small village in Staffordshire, England. The first mention of the Oaken place-name was in 1086 when it was listed in the Domesday Book as Ache. Its origin appears to be from the Old English, ācum - (place of) the oaks.

Oaken lies just one mile west of Codsall where the population taken at the 2011 census can be found. It is home to Oaken Terrace Nursing Home, a large nursing home situated just off Oaken Drive. Oaken's only pub is The Oaken Arms, a Vintage Inns pub on Holyhead Road - formerly The Foaming Jug, it re-opened in November 2010.

== See also ==
- Listed buildings in Codsall
