= RAF Perton =

Former Royal Air Force Relief Landing Ground in Staffordshire, England

RAF Perton
- Perton, Staffordshire
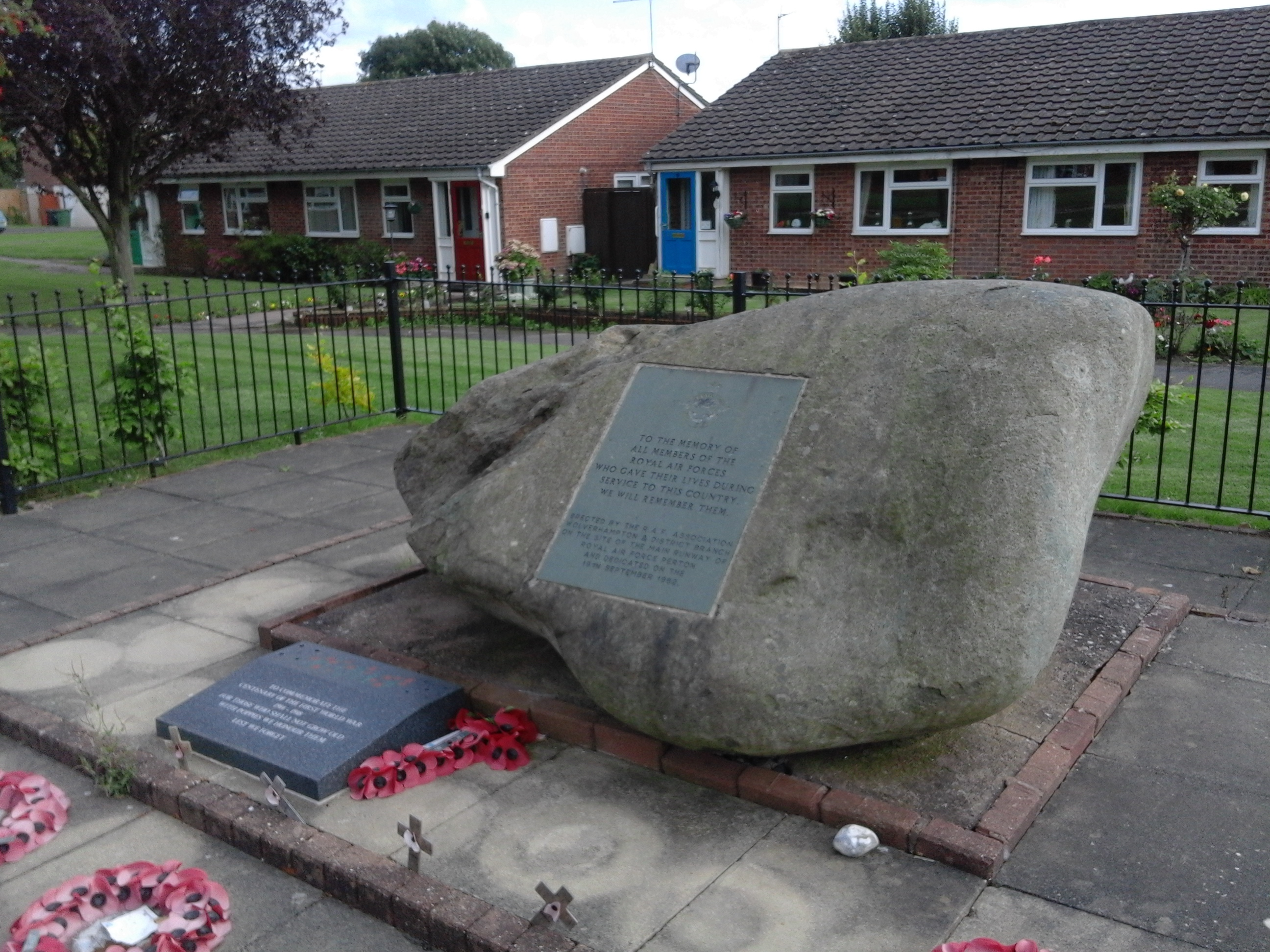
- Commemorative stone for those who served at RAF Perton. The stone is located where the main runway used to be

Site information
- Type: Relief Landing Ground
- Owner: Air Ministry
- Controlled by: Royal Air Force

Location
- Location in Staffordshire
- Coordinates: 52.596°N 2.205°W
- Height: 400' asl

Site history
- Built: 1939
- In use: 1940-1947
- Battles/wars: Second World War

Airfield information
Runways
Direction	Length and surface
04/22	1,400 yd (1,300 m) Tarmac
16/34	1,100 yd (1,000 m) Tarmac
10/28	1,100 yd (1,000 m) Tarmac

Royal Air Force Perton, or more simply RAF Perton, is a former Royal Air Force Relief Landing Ground (RLG) located in Perton, Staffordshire, England. It is 3 miles (4.8 km) north west of Wolverhampton and 10 miles (16 km) north east of Bridgnorth.

It was open between 1941 and 1946 and was built on the site of a former First World War airfield. The village of Perton now occupies the site of the former airfield.

== History ==
The site was first used by No 38 Squadron of the Royal Flying Corps (later Royal Air Force) between 1916 and 1918. It was abandoned after the First World War but was used sporadically for non-military flying (usually air displays). Shortly after the outbreak of the Second World War the construction of the airfield began in the typical triangular pattern with three runways (two of 1,100 yards and one of 1,400 yards) using ash from Lower Gornal and stone from Oldbury with the intention of Perton becoming a fighter station which is evident by the number of fighter pen dispersals situated around the perimeter track. However Perton instead became a relief landing ground for use by other airfields most notably RAF Wheaton Aston when No. 21 (P)AFU was established there.

The following units were based at RAF Perton at some point:

- No. 5 (Pilots) Advanced Flying Unit RAF ((P) AFU).
- No. 38 Squadron RAF, 1916-17
- RLG for No. 11 Flying Training School between January 1942 and 14 March 1942.
- RLG for No. 11 (Pilots) Advanced Flying Unit between 4 August 1942 and 1 August 1943.
- RLG for No. 21 (Pilots) Advanced Flying Unit between 1 August 1943 and 16 July 1946.

The airfield was used by two civilian locally based companies. Both Helliwells (Walsall) and Boulton-Paul (Wolverhampton) had air testing areas of their own, but these were too small for the larger aircraft and so used Perton when aircraft needed to be finished or for when they were being serviced.

The Princess Wilhelmina Brigade of the Dutch Army trained here and later took part in the liberation of their country. (Note: The Dutch Brigade located here was known as the Princess Irene Brigade, but Queen Wilhelmina took up residence at Perton Ridge with what remained of the Royal Netherlands family's gold. The brigade was re-named after her, but is often listed as Princess Irene Brigade.)

In August 1946, the airfield and its associated buildings were put under the Care and Maintenance programme after the last Airspeed Oxfords of N0. 21 (P)AFU left in the previous month. In 1947 RAF Perton was abandoned and given to the Agricultural Land Commission with the Dutch camp becoming a refugee camp for Poles, Latvians and Lithuanians until 1950 when it was converted to housing and occupied until 1962.

== Current use ==
The idea of turning the area over to housing was first mooted in 1963, although the initial scheme was rejected. In 1972, the Mander family sold the site of the airfield to a private developer for £5.5 million, with the first houses being occupied within a couple of years and Perton being firmly established as a major residential area by the 21st century, by which time some 12,000 people were living there.

A Memorial in honour of all who trained here – many of whom gave their lives during the war – and remnants of air raid shelters which can still be found in the surrounding woodland.
