= Listed buildings in Codsall =

Codsall is a civil parish in the district of South Staffordshire, Staffordshire, England. It contains 20 listed buildings that are recorded in the National Heritage List for England. Of these, one is at Grade II*, the middle of the three grades, and the others are at Grade II, the lowest grade. The parish contains the villages of Codsall and Oaken, and the surrounding countryside. Most of the listed buildings are houses and associated structures, cottages, farmhouses and farm buildings, and the others include a church, a cross base and memorials in the churchyard, two mileposts, and a railway bridge and a railway station.

== Key ==
Grade	Criteria
II*	Particularly important buildings of more than special interest
II	Buildings of national importance and special interest

== Buildings ==
Name and location	Photograph	Date	Notes	Grade
St Nicholas' Church; 52.63407°N 2.19920°W		12th century	The oldest part of the church is the Norman south doorway, the tower dates from the 14th century, and the rest of the church was built in 1846–48 in Decorated style. It is built in stone, and consists of a nave, north and south aisles, a south porch, a chancel, a north vestry, and a west tower. The tower has diagonal buttresses, a large three-light west window, and an embattled parapet with corner finials.	II*
Churchyard cross base 52.63394°N 2.19907°W	—	15th century (probable)	The cross base is in the churchyard of St Nicholas' Church. It is in stone and consists of the base of a shaft on two steps, and is used as a sundial.	II
Laceys Bistro, The Square; 52.63070°N 2.20050°W		Late 16th or early 17th century	A house, later used for other purposes, it is timber framed on a sandstone plinth, partly rebuilt in brick, and has a tile roof. There are two storeys and a T-shaped plan, with a hall range, and a projecting gabled cross-wing on the right. On the front is a porch, and the windows are casements.	II
Manor Barn, Oaken; 52.62358°N 2.21220°W		17th century	Originally timber framed, the barn is in stone with a tile roof and four bays. It contains large double barn doors and small loops.	II
The Old Cottage; 52.63380°N 2.19851°W	—	17th century	The cottage is timber framed, and partly rebuilt in brick, and has a tile roof. There is one storey and an attic, two bays, and a later rear extension. On the front is a porch and a bay window, the other windows are casements with leaded lights, and there are two gabled dormers.	II
Oaken Park Farmhouse; 52.62953°N 2.24095°W	—	1736	A red brick farmhouse with dentilled eaves and a tile roof. There are two storeys and an attic, two parallel ranges, and three bays. The central doorway has fluted pilasters, and a moulded cornice on foliated console brackets. The windows are sashes with segmental heads and raised keystones.	II
The Dower House, Oaken; 52.62145°N 2.20913°W	—	Mid to Late 18th century	A red brick house that has an M-shaped tiled roof with shaped and coped gable parapets, and stone urns on moulded kneelers. There are three storeys, two parallel ranges, and a front of three bays. The central doorway has Tuscan pilasters, an architrave, a rectangular fanlight, a frieze, and a triangular pediment, and the windows are sashes with raised keystones. The house is flanked by former pavilions, each with a blind round-headed arch, and a wall ramped up to the house.	II
Codsall House; 52.62961°N 2.20203°W	—	Late 18th century	A house, later an office, it is in red brick with rusticated quoins, dentilled eaves, a rendered parapet, and a tile Mansard roof. There are two storeys and an attic, three bays, and to the left is a semicircular two-storey bay window. The central doorway has an architrave, pilasters, a semicircular fanlight, and an open pediment on fluted brackets, and the windows are sashes.	II
Nathaniel Barrett Memorial; 52.63379°N 2.19879°W	—	1795	The memorial is in the churchyard of St Nicholas' Church, and is to the memory of Nathaniel Barrett. It is a chest tomb in stone with an oblong plan. The tomb has a moulded base and cornice, two panels on each long side with moulded surrounds, and fluted corner pilasters with gadrooning at the base.	II
John Karver Memorial; 52.63388°N 2.19931°W	—	c. 1800	The memorial is in the churchyard of St Nicholas' Church, and is to the memory of John Karver and Beatrice Wood. It is an altar tomb in stone with a square plan. The tomb has side panels with quadrant corners, corner pilasters, a stepped base, and a moulded cornice surmounted by an urn.	II
Egginton family Memorial; 52.63374°N 2.19879°W	—	Early 19th century	The memorial is in the churchyard of St Nicholas' Church, and is to the memory of members of the Eggington family. It is an altar tomb in stone with a square plan. The tomb has a moulded base and cornice, panelled sides with quadrant corners, corner pilasters, and caps and a frieze decorated with fleurons.	II
Manor House, Oaken; 52.62474°N 2.21315°W	—	Early 19th century	A red brick house with a sill band, overhanging eaves, and a hipped slate roof. There are two storeys and four bays. On the entrance front is a Corinthian portico with columns, pilasters, and a full entablature. There are two French windows, and the other windows are sashes with flat-topped hoods on fluted console brackets.	II
Milepost at N.G.R. SJ 84750251; 52.62030°N 2.22656°W		Early 19th century	The milepost is on the north side of the A41 road. It is in cast iron, and has a triangular plan and a chamfered top. On the top face is "CODSALL", and the lower faces indicate the distances to Wolverhampton, Shifnal, Wellington, and Shrewsbury.	II
Milepost at N.G.R. SJ 86180165; 52.61256°N 2.20565°W		Early 19th century	The milepost is on the northeast side of the A41 road. It is in cast iron, and has a triangular plan and a chamfered top. On the top face is "CODSALL", and the lower faces indicate the distances to Wolverhampton, Shifnal, Wellington, and Shrewsbury.	II
Wergs Hall; 52.60991°N 2.19496°W	—	c. 1840	A country house in Italianate style, later used for other purposes, it is rendered, with overhanging eaves and hipped slate roofs. It consists of a main house with two storeys to the left, a lower service wing with two storeys in the centre, and a four-stage turret to the right. The main house has four bays, the left bay angled, and has a central porch with Tuscan pilasters and a balustraded parapet. The windows are sashes with raised surrounds. The service wing has six bays and sash windows, and the turret has banded rustication and a sash window in the first stage, a round, double-headed window in the third stage, and a clock in the top stage.	II
Railway Bridge No. 361; 52.62755°N 2.20240°W		1848	The bridge carries the railway over Station Road. The abutments are in engineering brick with stone dressings, and each has a flat buttress, a parapet band and a coped parapet. The girders are in cast iron with panelled parapets.	II
Codsall Railway Station and Footbridge; 52.62729°N 2.20172°W		c. 1850	The station was built for the Shrewsbury and Birmingham Railway. It is in red brick with painted stone dressings, it has a slate roof, and is in Italianate style. There are four bays, the third bay projects and is gabled with moulded bargeboards and a finial. To the right is a two-storey bay, and to the left are two single-storey bays, the left bay with a pyramidal roof and a finial. Between the two left bays is a projecting gabled porch. The doorway and windows have round heads. The footbridge is dated 1883, it is in cast iron and has a corrugated iron roof, bargeboards and finials. There are two flights, an iron lattice guard, and palmette-capped columns to the landings.	II
Greenhills; 52.61809°N 2.20696°W	—	Mid 19th century	The house is rendered with a coped parapet and cornices, and a tile roof with gables and moulded kneelers. It is in Tudor style, with two storeys. The main part has three bays, and there is a recessed lower three-bay service wing. The middle bay of the main part is recessed, the outer bays are gabled, and on the front is a projecting square porch with a Tudor arched entrance, and the doorway also has a Tudor arch. On the ground floor are square bay windows with crested cornices, and the upper floor contains casement windows with hood moulds. On the east front are square gabled oriel windows.	II
Coach House, Stable block and gate piers, Greenhills; 52.61784°N 2.20718°W	—	Mid 19th century	The buildings are in red brick with hipped slate roofs. They form two parallel ranges, and are linked by a wall at one end and a gateway with piers at the other. Both ranges have two storeys and contain casement windows, the coach house has a segmental coach arch, and in the stable range are two doorways. The gate piers are in brick and have stone dressings.	II
Pendrell Hall; 52.64038°N 2.22250°W		1870	A small country house that was remodelled in 1909–10. It is in red brick with stone dressings and a tile roof. There are two storeys, an attic and a basement. The main garden front has three gabled bays, the outer bays containing two-storey embattled bow windows, and the middle bay has a stepped gable. The second garden front has three bays, with single-storey embattled bow windows in the outer bays, and a canted bay window with a plain parapet in the centre.	II
