= Wolverhampton bus station =

Bus station in Wolverhampton, England

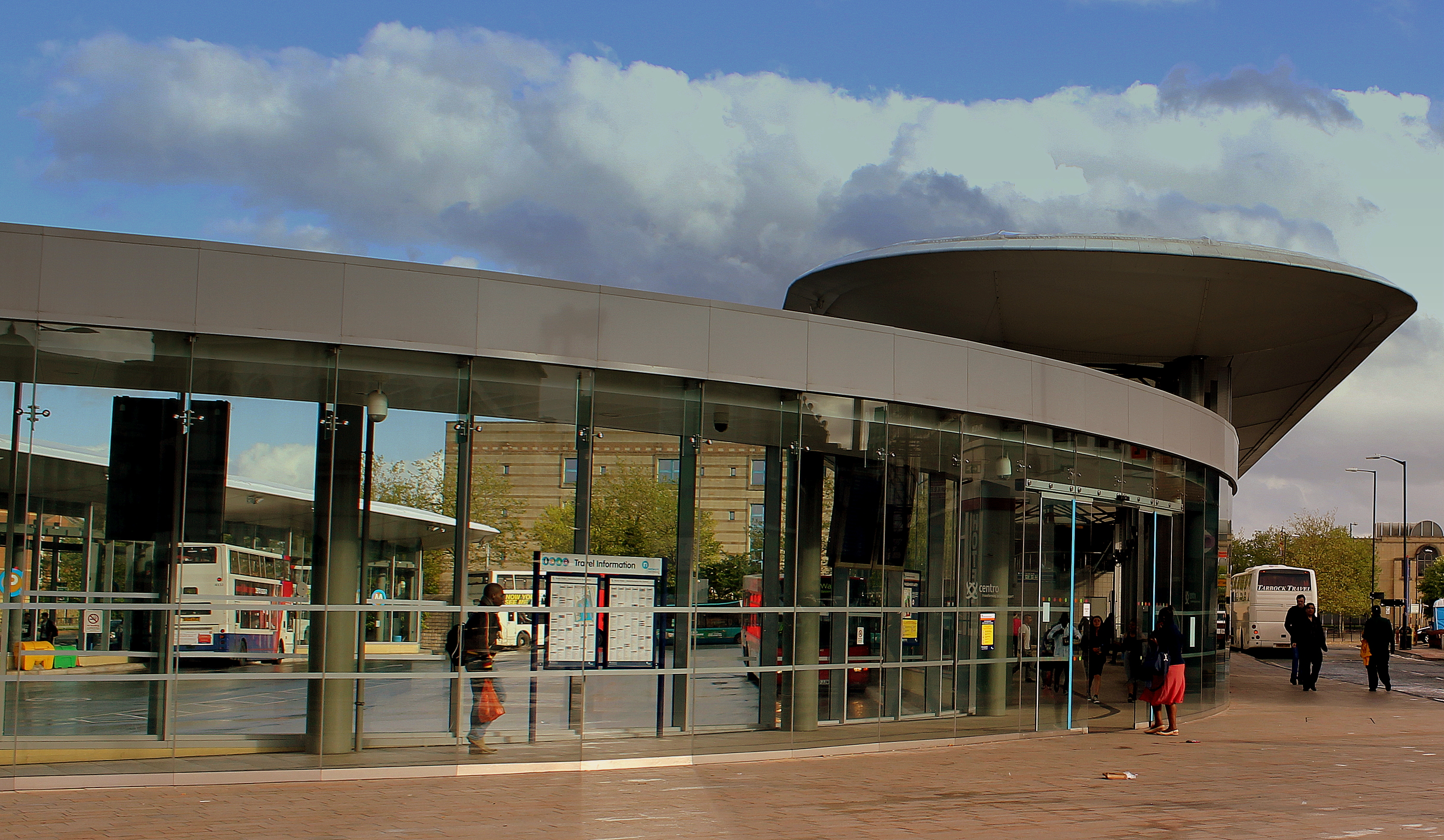
- Wolverhampton bus station in 2013

General information
- Location: Pipers Row, Horseley Fields, Wolverhampton; City of Wolverhampton
- Coordinates: 52.586°N 2.122°W
- Operator: Transport for West Midlands
- Bus stands: 19 (as of 2011)
- Bus operators: National Express West Midlands; Arriva Midlands; Diamond West Midlands; Let's Go; Banga Bus; Chaserider; National Express Coaches
- Connections: Wolverhampton railway station; Pipers Row tram stop

Construction
- Architect: Austin-Smith:Lord
Location

Wolverhampton bus station is part of a major public transport interchange in the city centre of Wolverhampton, in the West Midlands region of England.

It is managed by Transport for West Midlands (TfWM). Local bus services operated by various companies serve the bus station which has 19 departure stands and a single unloading stand although due to logistics in practice most buses unload at or near their departure stand. The bus station is located between Wolverhampton, St George's, West Midlands Metro tram terminus and Wolverhampton railway station, on the site of the former bus station and Pipers Row House, a mid-1990s retail and office block.

== Background ==
Prior to 1923 Wolverhampton had a mix of motor buses and trams. Trolleybuses ran in the town from 1923 until 1967. The station, which had existed since 1986, was closed after service finished on 3 April 2010. The 1986 bus station replaced the 1980 bus station on the same site which in turn had replaced the original bus station on the northern side of Railway Drive which had primarily been used by Midland Red services.

== Current bus station ==
The bus station was designed by architects, Austin-Smith:Lord and the mechanical & electrical (M&E) consultants were Hilson Moran. The three steel and glass 'boulevards' are under a translucent, PTFE architectural fabric roof and feature glass-enclosed waiting areas and electronic doors, allowing passengers out of designated pedestrian areas only when buses are on stand. The station's W-shaped design removes the need for bus and pedestrian paths to cross.

The bus station's enquiry office is now in the main building, but was in the Queen's Building, a grade II listed building, which was host to Costa Coffee, but which was formerly the carriage entrance to the railway station and is currently empty. The travel shop closed permanently on 1st April 2023.

== The Interchange Project ==
Building work began in 2010 and in the ensuing months a new pedestrian bridge linking the railway and bus stations was built, a contraflow system installed along the ring road and the bus station rebuilt. The station re-opened on 24 July 2011, which coincided with the Wolverhampton bus network review and marked the end of Phase One of the project. Phase Two, given the go ahead in December 2014 includes improvements to the railway station, a new hotel and redevelopment of the canalside area. The Railway Station Car Park has been refurbished and extended to increase capacity to just over 900 parking spaces. The entire project will eventually see public transport in Wolverhampton connecting in one place linking the bus station, railway station and the West Midlands Metro; the latter's Piper's Row tram stop to be located adjacent to the bus station. This extension opened in September 2023.

== Bus services ==
Route	Destination	Via	Operator	Notes
2	Bushbury Warstones	Low Hill Bradmore	National Express West Midlands	
5	Codsall	Whitmore Reans, Billbrook	Chaserider	Eves and Sunday journeys are operated by National Express.
6/6A	Wobaston	Whitmore Reans, Pendeford	National Express West Midlands	
8	Wollaston Farm	Parkfields, Dudley, Merry Hill Centre, Stourbridge	National Express West Midlands	
9	Walsall	Wednesfield, New Invention, Bloxwich, Pelsall	National Express West Midlands	
9	Bridgnorth	Compton, Shipley	Arriva Midlands	
10	Perton	Compton, Tettenhall Wood	National Express West Midlands	
10A	Pattingham	Compton, Tettenhall Wood, Perton	National Express West Midlands	
11 11	Underhill	Fallings Park, The Scotlands	National Express West Midlands Let's Go	
16	Stourbridge	Penn, Wombourne, Swindon, Kingswinford, Wordsley	National Express West Midlands	
16A	Wombourne	Penn	National Express West Midlands	Evening & Sunday
25	Pendeford	Bilston, Willenhall, Wednesfield, Fordhouses	Chaserider	Evening and Sunday journeys do not serve Wolverhampton. Service previously operated by National Express West Midlands.
26A	Stowlawn	Goldthorn Park, Bilston	Diamond West Midlands	Evening & Sun
27/27A	Dudley	Sedgley, Gornal Wood, Milking Bank	Diamond West Midlands	
32/33	Northwood Park (Circular)	Oxley, Low Hill	National Express West Midlands	
53	Bilston	Ettingshall, Moseley, New Cross, Wednesfield	Banga Bus	
57	Willenhall (John Street)	Heath Town, Wood End, Wednesfield	Chaserider	Continued to Bilston until 14/6/25. Operated by Diamond West Midlands until November 2025.
59 59	Ashmore Park (Circular)	Heath Town, Wednesfield	National Express West Midlands Let's Go	
61	Goldthorn Park (Circular)	Blakenhall	Diamond West Midlands	
63	Oxbarn Avenue	Merridale, Bradmore	Diamond West Midlands	
64	Wakeley Hill	Penn Road, Mount Road	Diamond West Midlands	Returns direct via Penn Road
65	Fordhouses	Heath Town, New Cross, Wood End, Bushbury	Diamond West Midlands	
69	Walsall	Heath Town, New Cross, Coppice Farm, Shortheath, Beechdale	National Express West Midlands	
70	Cannock	The Scotlands, Westcroft, Featherstone, Cheslyn Hay, Longford	Chaserider	
71	Cannock	Heath Town, Wednesfield, Essington, Landywood, Cheslyn Hay	Chaserider	Journeys serve Wolverhampton Mon-Fri only
79	West Bromwich	Bilston, Darlaston, Wednesbury, Hill Top	National Express West Midlands	
81	Dudley	Parkfields, Cinder Hill, Coseley	Banga Bus National Express West Midlands	Mon-Sat daytime Evening & Sun.
82 82	Dudley	Moseley, Bilston, Coseley, Wrens Nest	National Express West Midlands Diamond West Midlands	Mon-Sat daytime Evening & Sun
529	Walsall	Willenhall, Bentley	National Express West Midlands	
530	Rocket Pool	All Saints, Millfields, Bilston	National Express West Midlands	Sundays only. Mon-Sat journeys are operated by Banga Bus from Bilston Street.
891	Telford	Tettenhall Wood, Albrighton, Cosford, Shifnal	Banga Bus	
X8	Birmingham	Parkfields, Dudley, Rowley Regis, Blackheath, Quinton	National Express West Midlands	
