= St Nicholas' Church, Codsall =

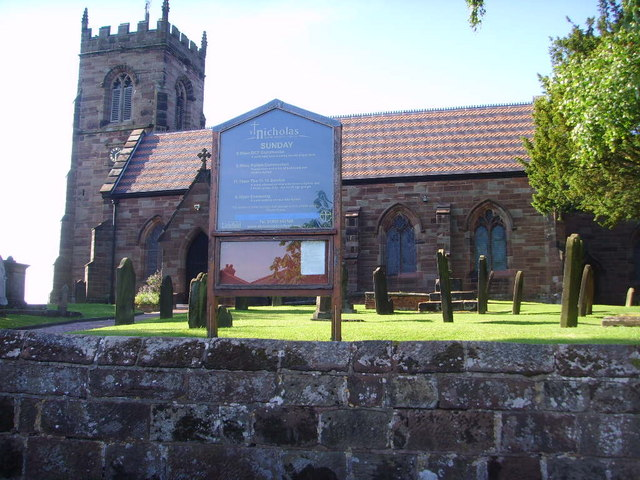
- St Nicholas’ Church, Codsall
- St Nicholas' Church, Codsall
- 52°38′5.11″N 2°11′57.96″W
- OS grid reference: SJ 86618 04051
- Location: Codsall
- Country: England
- Denomination: Church of England

History
- Dedication: St. Nicholas

Architecture
- Heritage designation: Grade II* listed
- Architect: Edward Banks
- Groundbreaking: 1846 (rebuild)
- Completed: 1848

Administration
- Diocese: Diocese of Lichfield
- Archdeaconry: Lichfield
- Deanery: Penkridge
- Parish: Codsall

St Nicholas’ Church, Codsall is a Grade II* listed parish church in the Church of England in Codsall, Staffordshire, England.

== History ==
The doorway is Norman. The west tower dates from the 14th century. The rest was built between 1846 and 1848 by architect Edward Banks. It comprises a 5 bay nave with aisles, south porch, north vestry, and west tower.

== Memorials and burials ==
- Walter Wrottesley (d. 1630).
- Sir Charles Wheeler, artist and sculptor, d. 1974
- Muriel, Lady Wheeler, artist and sculptor, wife of Sir Charles Wheeler, d. 1979.

== Organ ==
The church contains a pipe organ by Reginald Fisk of Wolverhampton and rebuilt by Hawkins in 1974. A specification of the organ can be found on the National Pipe Organ Register.

== See also ==
- Grade II* listed buildings in South Staffordshire
- Listed buildings in Codsall
