= Codsall =

Village in Staffordshire, England

Coordinates: 52.62671°N 2.19237°W

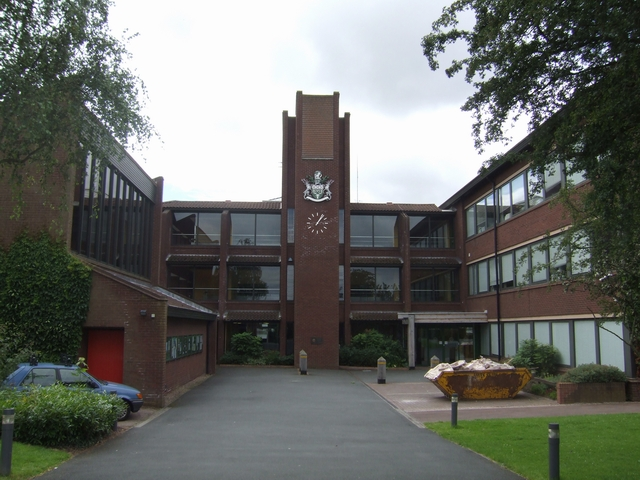
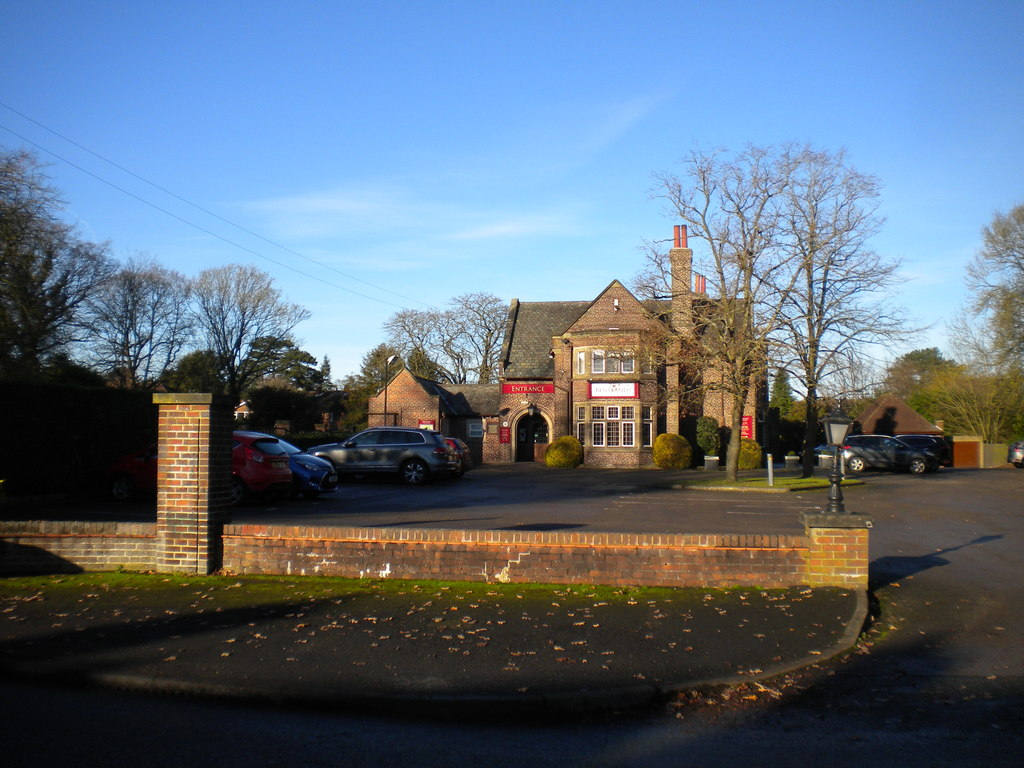
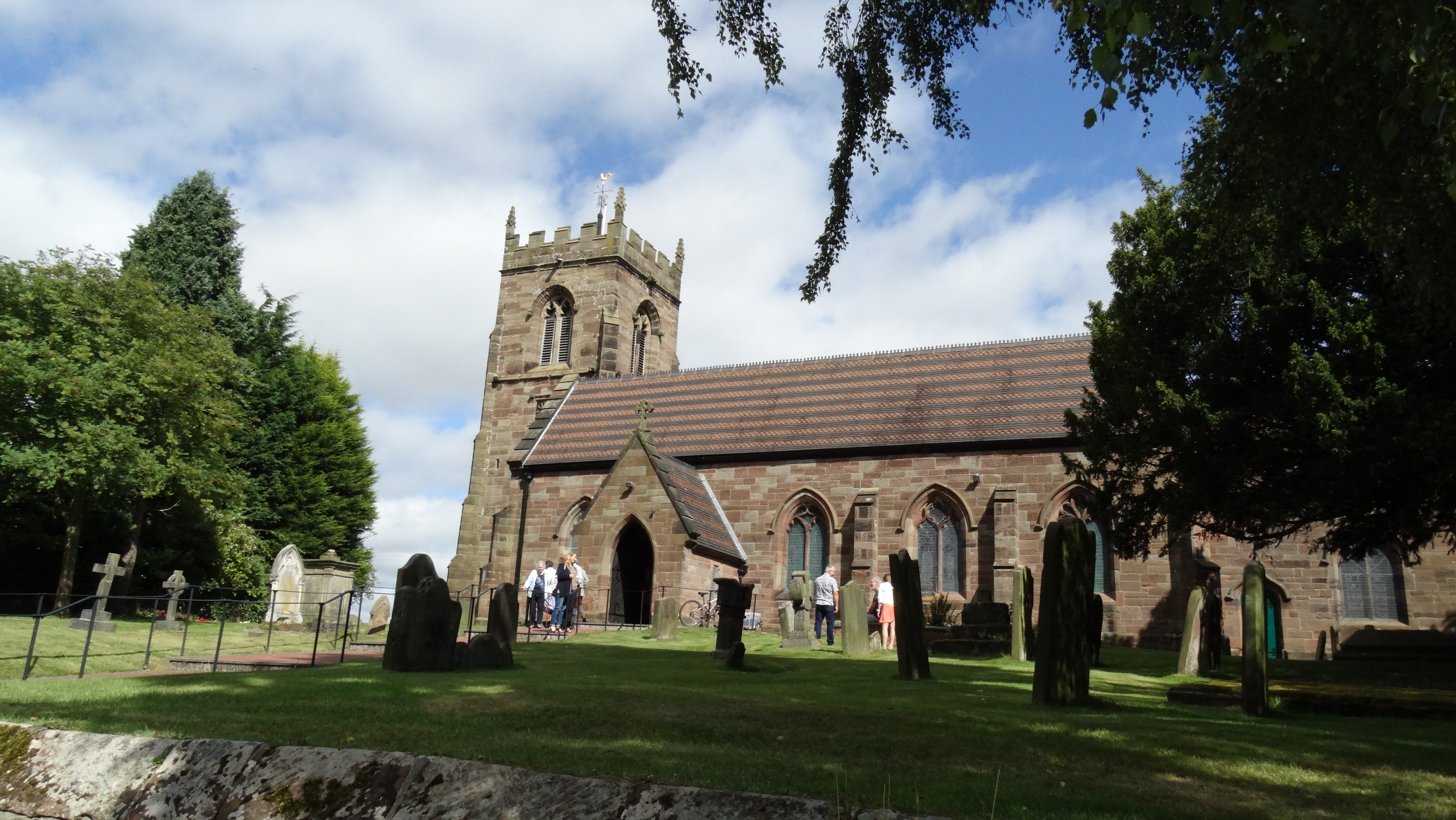
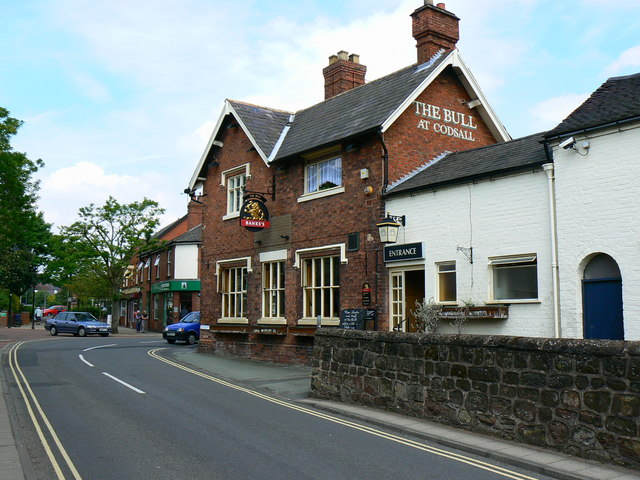
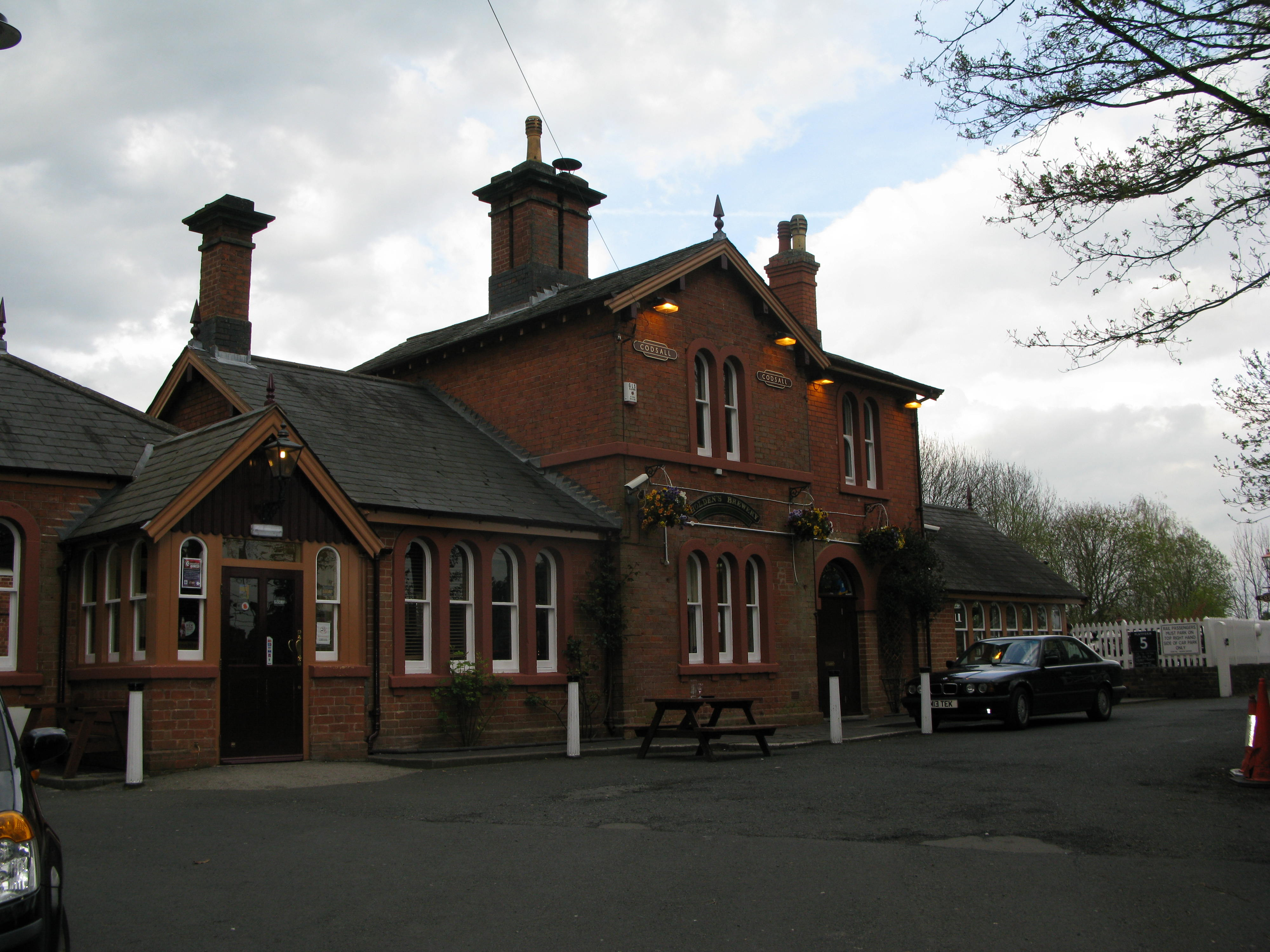
- Clockwise from top: Codsall District Centre, Parish Church, Railway Station, The Bull Inn Pub and Bentlands

- Location within Staffordshire
- Population: 11,860 (2021 Census)
- OS grid reference: SJ870032
- District: South Staffordshire
- Shire county: Staffordshire
- Region: West Midlands
- Country: England
- Sovereign state: United Kingdom
- Post town: Wolverhampton
- Postcode district: WV8
- Dialling code: 01902
- Police: Staffordshire
- Fire: Staffordshire
- Ambulance: West Midlands
- UK Parliament: Kingswinford & South Staffordshire

Codsall is a large village and civil parish in the South Staffordshire district of Staffordshire, England. It is situated 5 miles northwest of Wolverhampton and 13 miles east-southeast of Telford. It forms part of the boundary of the Staffordshire-West Midlands County border, along with Perton, the village is almost contiguous with Wolverhampton with very small amounts of greenbelt still separating the two settlements.

== History ==
In 1086, the Domesday Book recorded six people in Codsall. They were probably the heads of households so the population would have been a little larger. Toponymists have the name Codsall coming from the old English 'Cod's Halh' – meaning a nook of land belonging to a man named Cod (Cod being an early English personal name, possibly in shortened form). The Church of St. Nicholas is the oldest building. It has a Norman doorway thought to date from the 11th century. Since medieval times, the area around the church, on the top of the hill, was the hub of the village with a windmill, village pond, forge, bakery and public house. The administration of the village would have been conducted from the church through the decisions of the vestry. Agriculture was the mainstay of the village and even now the strip-field system of cultivation can be seen to the west and north-east of St Nicholas' church.

Church Street, now called Church Road, lies between the road junction and the church. There was a significant change after Codsall railway station, on the Shrewsbury and Birmingham Railway, opened in 1849. The station became the commercial hub of the village with a goods yard, coal yard and cattle pens. Development took place along Station Road and beyond with some substantial properties being built to accommodate wealthy businessmen from Wolverhampton and the Black Country.

Gradually the focus of activity changed from the area around the church and the station to the crossroads or 'Square'. Emphasis on the Square was increased after 1900 when Baker's Nurseries expanded on the site of Old Hall Farm in Church Street. The growth of public transport, with a terminus for buses to Wolverhampton in the Square, the coming of electricity and the digging of the deep sewer all in the 1920s, helped to change the function of the village from an agricultural centre into a dormitory for Wolverhampton. This has been reflected in the development of several housing estates, new schools and improved roads.

== Present day ==
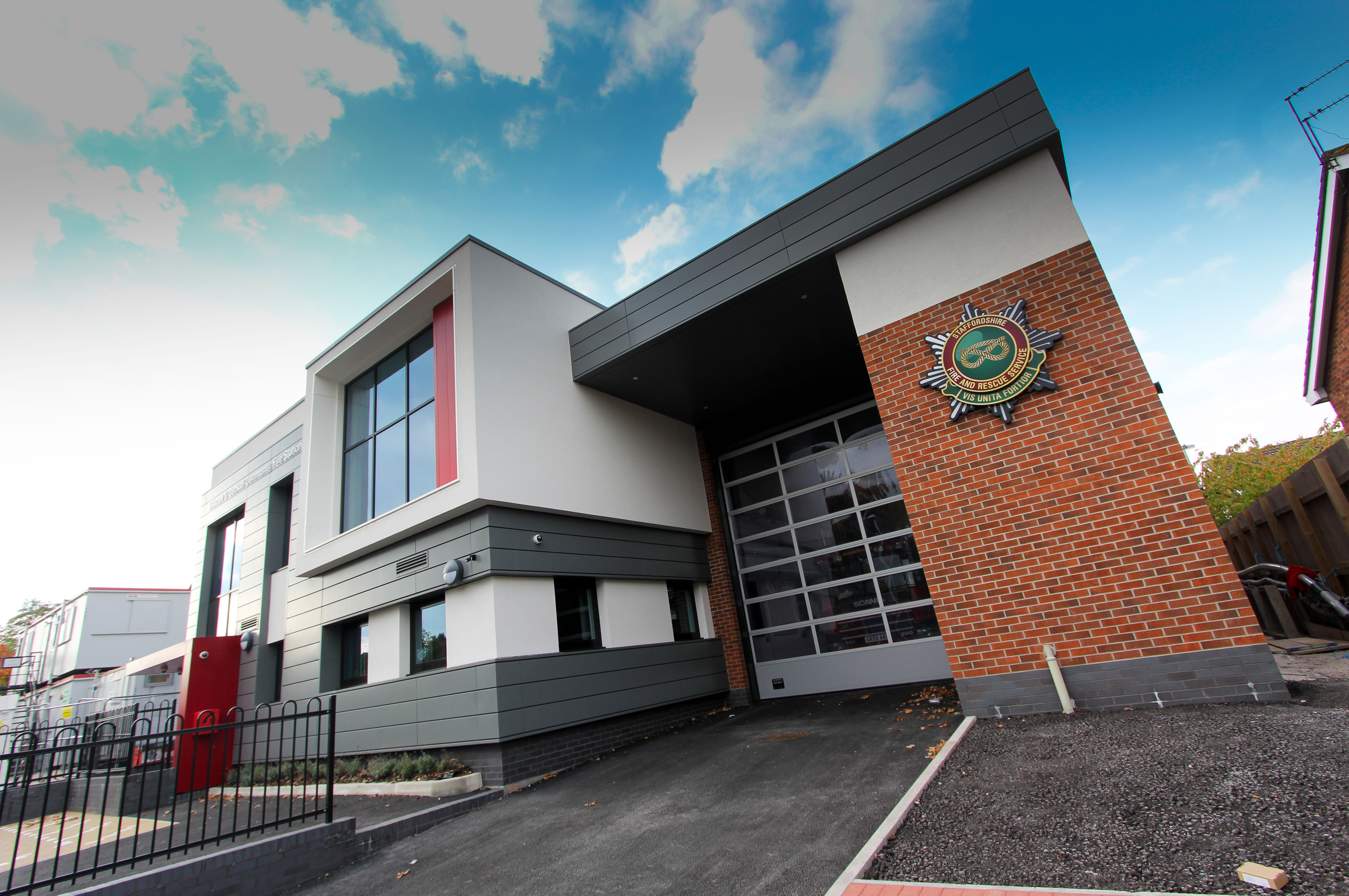
Bilbrook and Codsall Community Fire Station, on Duck Lane, Codsall, in October 2015

Codsall has expanded since World War II, forming the largest part of three adjoining villages (the others being Bilbrook and Oaken). It is the site of the headquarters of South Staffordshire District Council. It is twinned with the French commune of Saint-Pryvé-Saint-Mesmin.

The village also has a cricket club called Codsall Cricket Club (Codsall CC), the club was established in 1897 and plays at the Village Hall. There is also a 3-par, 18 hole golf course (The Ledene). In the village, Codsall Community High School runs a post-16 Football Academy for their students.

The main shopping area around The Square has a variety of shops including a local wine shop. Another shopping area is around Birches Bridge, where the shops include a branch of The Co-operative Food.

Although not part of the city of Wolverhampton, Codsall along with neighbouring villages Perton, Wombourne, Himley, Swindon, Featherstone and Essington form part of a built up area of South Staffordshire around the West Midlands County (Wolverhampton and Dudley) and Shropshire (Cosford and Albrighton).

== Education ==
Codsall Community High School opened in 1940 as the only secondary school in the area, starting as a secondary modern school before becoming Codsall Comprehensive School in 1969. By this stage it provided education for pupils aged 11–18, but a reorganisation of education in the area saw a name change and most notably a change in the age range, with the school now serving pupils aged 13–18. and it has three feeder middle schools; Codsall Middle School, Bilbrook Middle School and Perton Middle School, all of which serve the 9-13 age range. This reorganisation came when Perton was first being developed for housing during the 1970s, and the school has continued to serve the Perton community after plans to build a secondary school in Perton during the 1970s never materialised.

There are also three first schools for pupils aged 5–9; Lane Green First School, St. Nicholas' C of E and Birches First School. St Christopher's Roman Catholic Primary School is the only primary school in the area.

Codsall Community High School was judged to be good by Ofsted in November 2013.

== Events ==
The first Codsall Beer Festival took place on 3 October 2015 at Codsall village hall, with over 35 real ales and ciders, many fruit wines and live music from local artists. Proceeds were donated to the Harry Will Walk charity & Codsall Community Group, a volunteer group that looks after the green spaces in Codsall, Codsall Wood and Oaken. The second Codsall Beer Festival took place on 1 October 2016 at Codsall Village Hall.

== Twin town ==
Codsall & Bilbrook are twinned with:

- Saint-Pryvé-Saint-Mesmin, near Orléans, France

== Notable residents ==
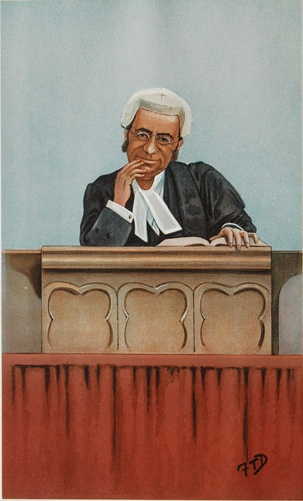
George Farwell in Vanity Fair, 1900

- Sir George Farwell (1845–1915), English judge, noted for presiding over the Taff Vale Railway Co v Amalgamated Society of Railway Servants case
- Sir Charles Wheeler KCVO CBE (1892–1974), British sculptor and President of the Royal Academy, 1956–1966, born and buried here.
- Major Roy Farran DSO MC and 2 bars (1921-2006), decorated World War II SAS veteran and future Canadian politician, had a family home at Codsall, which in 1948 was sent a parcel bomb by Jewish terrorist group Lehi posted to him but was instead opened by his younger brother Francis Rex Farran, who was killed.
- Don Homfray (1935 in Codsall – 2012), BAFTA-winning production designer for the BBC
- Jim Lea (born 1949), English musician; member of Slade from their inception until 1992; went to Codsall Community High School
- Bernard O'Mahoney (born 1960), English author, security detail, and former soldier; lived in Codsall
- Christopher Sadler (born 1970), British animator, director and writer; went to Codsall Community High School
- Jacqui Oatley (born 1974), MBE, English broadcaster and sports presenter; brought up in Codsall

=== Sport ===
- Peter Broadbent (1933–2013), footballer, played 452 games for Wolves and 7 times for England, lived locally.
- Geoff Palmer (born 1954), footballer, played over 400 games for Wolves; then police officer; retired and lives in Codsall
- William Regal (born 1968), ring name of Darren Kenneth Matthews, English retired professional wrestler.

== Transport ==
Codsall has a railway station on the Shrewsbury-Wolverhampton Line, and has train services to Shrewsbury, Telford, Wolverhampton and Birmingham. The village also has regular bus links with Wolverhampton. Banga Bus Services operate a 30 minute 5/X5 service Mon-Fri. On Saturdays service 5, runs to an hourly frequency. In addition an hourly daily evening and Sunday service is provided on service 5 by Chaserider under subsidy. Buses were formerly operated by National Express West Midlands.

== See also ==
- Listed buildings in Codsall
