= Queen's Building, Wolverhampton =

Queen's Building
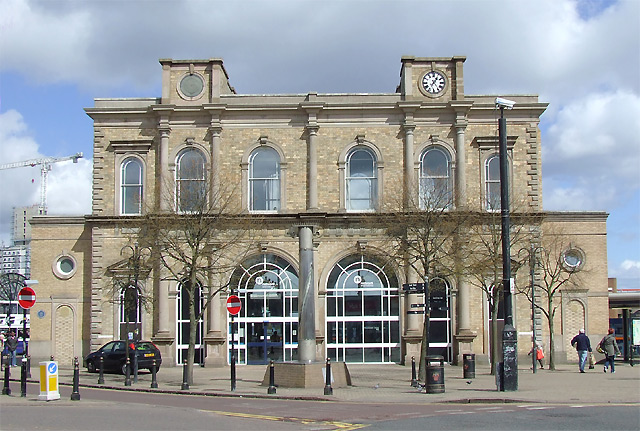
- The Queen's Building, Wolverhampton, formerly the carriage entrance to Wolverhampton High Level station
- Interactive map of the Queen's Building area

General information
- Location: Queen Street, Wolverhampton, England
- Coordinates: 52.586132°N 2.122713°W; SO 91783 98710
- Current tenants: National Express West Midlands
- Inaugurated: 1 October 1849

Design and construction
- Architect: Edward Banks
- Designations: Grade II listed

The Queen's Building is a grade II listed building in Wolverhampton in the West Midlands of England. Built in 1849 as the carriage entrance to Wolverhampton railway station, it opened three years before the station itself. The two buildings were built in a similar style, but the station building was replaced in the 1960s. The Queen's Building has not been used as the carriage entrance for many years but functions as part of the city's bus station up to date.

== Design ==
The building is two storeys high and constructed primarily of grey brick with ashlar dressing. It has two central carriage arches, flanked by much narrower pedestrian arches and pedimented windows. The six-bay facade is articulated by two orders of attached columns that rise through a frieze and cornice to the first floor. There they divide six tall windows up to a roof-level cornice. Above the roof are two low, square turrets with round faces, one of which contains a clock. The archways formerly contained iron gates, which were replaced with glass in the late 20th century.

The building complemented the façade of the original Wolverhampton High Level station until the latter was demolished in the mid-1960s and replaced with a more modern structure. The new building is described as "vastly inferior" by railway historian Gordon Biddle, as part of the modernisation of the West Coast Main Line.

== History ==
The building was built by Edward Banks in 1849 for the Shrewsbury and Birmingham Railway as the carriage entrance to Wolverhampton High Level railway station. The carriage building was opened to passengers on 1 October 1849. It sits in Queen Street in Wolverhampton, at the foot of a 220-yard (200 metre) driveway which led to the station on the opposite side of the Birmingham Canal. The railway company had its offices on the first floor and a ticket office on the ground floor. It was completed three years prior to the opening of the main station building. With the amalgamation of the railway companies in the 1840s, the Shrewsbury and Birmingham Railway became part of the Great Western Railway (GWR) and the High Level station, and thus the Queen's Building, became jointly owned by the GWR and the London and North Western Railway (LNWR) until 1859, by which time the GWR had built Wolverhampton Low Level railway station and the LNWR took sole control.

A single-storey extension, built in a sympathetic style to the original, was added to each side in the late 20th century.

The building fell into a state of severe dereliction in the 1970s but was comprehensively rebuilt on instruction of Wolverhampton Council by local contractor Royle & Stanley between 1988 - 1991. The project resulted in the building providing rest facilities for bus drivers with a small cafe downstairs, and an enquiry bureau for West Midlands Travel Executive in a new structure nearby which has since been demolished. Since the bus station was rebuilt in 2011, the Queen's Building has hosted a Costa. It became a grade II listed building in 1977 and is described by English Heritage as "a reminder of Wolverhampton's importance as a railway centre".
