= Perton =

Civil parish in Staffordshire, England

Coordinates: 52.5922°N 2.20492°W

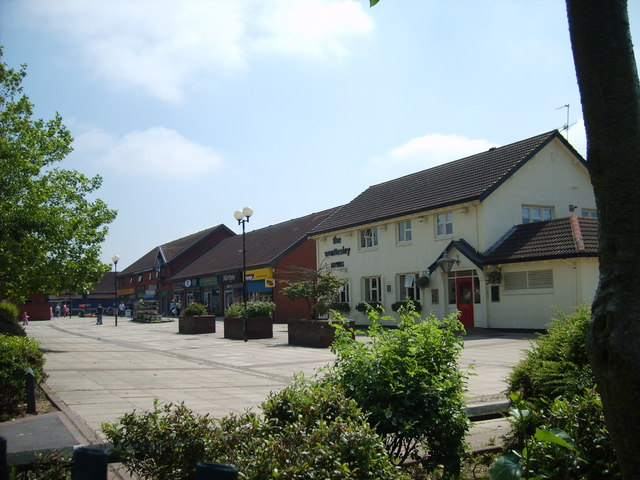
- Perton Shopping Centre

- Location within Staffordshire
- Population: 9,299 (2021)
- OS grid reference: SO862993
- District: South Staffordshire
- Shire county: Staffordshire
- Region: West Midlands
- Country: England
- Sovereign state: United Kingdom
- Post town: Wolverhampton
- Postcode district: WV6
- Dialling code: 01902
- Police: Staffordshire
- Fire: Staffordshire
- Ambulance: West Midlands

Perton is a large estate and civil parish located in the South Staffordshire District, Staffordshire, England. It lies 3 miles to the south of Codsall and 4 miles west of Wolverhampton, where part of the estate is conjoined to the estate of Tettenhall.

== Etymology ==
The name Perton is derived from 'Pear Town' due to the number of pear trees that once grew there.

== Overview ==
=== Perton ===
The only direct road connection between Perton and Wolverhampton is for the use of buses and emergency vehicles only; private vehicles must travel north or south from Perton and use the A41 or A454.

The main road in Perton is The Parkway; this name is given to a 2.25 mile long circular road as well as the two spurs which link it to the main road network. At the centre of the estate lies a shopping centre containing a Sainsbury's supermarket and a number of other shops including a butchers,pharmacy barbers, women's hair salon, vets, Morrisons convenience, building society two charity shops, cafe, chip shop, Indian takeaway, dentist, doctors surgeries, library, as well as an interdenominational church and Lakeside Community Church meeting in the Civic Centre. Perton has three schools: Perton First School, Perton Primary Academy and Perton Middle School.

=== Old Perton ===
Old Perton, also known as Perton Ridge, consists of large houses and a farm; it is located to the south of the modern estate on the road to Pattingham, called Pattingham Road.

== History ==
=== Old Perton ===
The original Perton lay upon the slopes of Perton ridge down to the Bridgnorth road. 'Perton' derived its name from 'Pear Town' in reference to a particular type of pear which grows in the area. The original manor was owned by Edward the Confessor and then by the Abbot of Westminster. The abbey held Perton manor until 1162 when it was transferred to the monarch who in turn gave it to Lord William Perton.

In 1260 a warren was set up for the raising of rabbits and the manor was held by John de Perton, heir to William, in return for eight days knightly service to the King of England in his wars against the Welsh.

In 1523 it was sold to James Leveson, a merchant from Wolverhampton, and it eventually passed down to Richard Leveson, a sailor, who served aboard the Ark Royal in the English Navy and who fought against the Spanish Armada. He became a commander and in 1596 was knighted after playing a leading role in the Navy's attack on Cádiz. After many subsequent attacks against Spain he was appointed Vice Admiral of England in 1604.

Perton once again changed hands when Sir Walter Wrottesley purchased Perton manor from Richard Sackville, 5th Earl of Dorset in 1662. It then remained in the Wrottesley family estate along with many farms until it was sold in the 1960s.

=== New Perton ===
During the First World War, Fern Fields was used as a relief landing ground for No 38 (Home Defence) Squadron of the Royal Flying Corps. In the period between the First and Second World Wars the site was used for barnstorming. On 22 June 1929 a famous aviation barnstormer named Alan Cobham went to Perton trying to persuade local dignitaries that they should all have their own local airfields by making speeches and taking the mayors and officials of Walsall, Wednesbury, Wolverhampton, and Stourbridge for flights in his DH-61 Giant Moth (a ten-seater enclosed cabin aeroplane).

Shortly after the start of the Second World War construction of RAF Perton began in the usual RAF triangular pattern, two of 1,100 yards and one of 1,400 yards, using ash from Lower Gornal and stone from Oldbury as a fighter station. However RAF Perton did not become a fighter station and instead served as a relief aerodrome for training pilots of other RAF stations – the Princess Irene Brigade of the Dutch Army trained at RAF Perton and later took part in the liberation of their country.

In 1947 RAF Perton was abandoned and given to the Agricultural Land Commission with the Dutch camp becoming a refuge camp for Polish, Latvians and Lithuanians until 1950 when it was converted to housing and occupied until 1962.

The name Perton now refers to this newer settlement with the old Perton being known as Old Perton or Perton Ridge. The only reminders of Perton's history is a Memorial in honour of all who trained at RAF Perton – many of whom gave their lives during the war – and remnants of air raid shelters which can still be found in the surrounding woodland.

In 1987, there were plans for Wolverhampton Council to absorb Perton and a number of nearby villages. However, these plans were highly controversial and ultimately never took place. One Perton councillor claimed that the people of Perton were against such a move as they were "keen to get away from Wolverhampton's bad image".

== Churches ==
Perton has two active Christian churches:

- The Church at Perton , which meets at the church in Anders Square in the centre of Perton, and
- Lakeside Community Church Perton , which meets at 10.30 am in Perton Civic Centre.

== Schools ==
Perton has three schools. They are:

- Perton First School (Manston Drive)
- Perton Primary Academy (Sandown Drive)
- Perton Middle School (Gainsborough Drive)

When students leave the first schools at the age of nine, the majority of them go on to study at Perton Middle School. However, some parents choose to send their children to schools in surrounding areas, such as Compton and Tettenhall. When the students finish at the middle school at the age of 13, the majority leave to study at Codsall Community High School, in the nearby village of Codsall. Some also venture as far as Bridgnorth, to attend such schools as Oldbury Wells School and the Endowed School, leaving Perton Middle in Year 6, due to the difference in tier systems.

The area around Perton and Codsall is one of the few areas of the country which still uses the three-tier system for schools (i.e. 5–9 first schools, 9–13 middle schools and 13-16/18 secondary schools).

Plans to build a secondary school in Perton during the 1980s never materialised.

== Countryside and wildlife ==
Perton features many walks and areas of countryside.

Paths:

There is a path with a fairly level gradient from Perton centre and the big lake (upper lake) to the little lake (lower lake), which then continues over a hill to Bluebell Wood. The whole route is about 1059 yards (3177'), or 2118 yards (6354') there and back (excluding the two woods).

Bluebell Wood:

Bluebell Wood was developed from a previous wood around the ex-RAF station. It is an internationally important site for bluebells and has a number of paths running through it. It is rumoured that Bluebell Wood is the site of underground Second World War bunkers.

There is another large wood across the Parkway [road] from Bluebell Wood, next to The Pear and Partridge.

The remains of RAF Perton can be found in both woods due to the fact Perton was once an airfield.

Other:

There are small woods and grassy areas around the big lake (upper lake) next to Perton Centre.

Perton also has a pavilion located off Gainsborough Drive which has a car park, sports fields and a wood. Dippons Lane and a network of paths connects it to Bluebell Wood and its surrounding area. The Staffordshire Way runs within half a mile of Perton.

=== Flora and fauna ===
Mammal species found in the area include common noctule, Daubenton's and pipistrelle bats, foxes and badgers. Both Perton lakes are great places to spot three species of bats. Noctules are often seen flying high above the upper lake at dusk, common pipistrelle just after dark, and Daubenton's bats later in the evening catching insects from the water surface.

=== Birds ===
These include great spotted woodpecker, green woodpecker, treecreeper, nuthatch, five tit species, sparrowhawk, buzzard and many finches including chaffinch, greenfinch, goldfinch and bullfinch. In winter large flocks of goldfinches and siskins can be found around the village and in the surrounding countryside there are redwing and fieldfare. The woodlands contain many fine trees including oaks and ash. In the spring lesser celandine can in found in great profusion along the Penk and other damp places. In autumn a wide variety of fungi can be found including puffballs, King Alfred's cakes and collared earthstars.

The two lakes and the area along the river Penk can hold mallard, tufted duck, mute swan, Canada goose, coot, moorhen, grey wagtail, grey heron and kingfisher. In addition occasional visits from pochard, great crested grebe, reed bunting and water rail excite local birdwatchers.

=== Insects ===
During the summer months damselflies and dragonflies are present, whilst in the spring and summer butterflies include speckled wood butterfly, meadow brown, ringlet, gatekeeper, orange tip and occasionally brimstone.

== Surrounding area ==
Baggeridge Country Park, Bratch Locks, Highgate Common, Himley Hall and Wombourne with its railway walks and Wom Brook Walk are all within South Staffordshire and only up to 20-minute driving distance from Perton.

== Notable people ==
Apart from the members of the aristocracy mentioned in the History section above

- Cyril Sidlow (1915 – 2005 in Perton) a Welsh football goalkeeper, played for several clubs, including Wolves.
- Neil Cutler (born 1976 in Perton) a former football goalkeeper who made 207 pro appearances, now goalkeeping coach at Aston Villa F.C.

== See also ==
- Listed buildings in Perton
