= Bilbrook, Staffordshire =

Village in Staffordshire, England

Coordinates: 52.62443°N 2.17427°W

Bilbrook
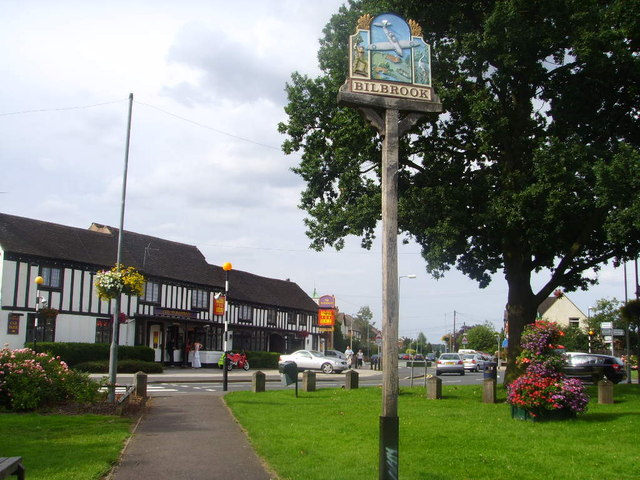

- Location within Staffordshire
- Area: 1,396 km^{2} (539 sq mi)
- Population: 4,700 (2021)
  - Density: 3.68
- OS grid reference: SJ882029
  - London: 145.53
- District: South Staffordshire
- Shire county: Staffordshire
- Region: West Midlands
- Country: England
- Sovereign state: United Kingdom
- Post town: WOLVERHAMPTON
- Postcode district: WV8
- Dialling code: 01902
- Police: Staffordshire
- Fire: Staffordshire
- Ambulance: West Midlands
- UK Parliament: South Staffordshire

Bilbrook is a village and civil parish in the South Staffordshire district of Staffordshire, England. It is situated close to the border of the West Midlands, just outside Wolverhampton. Bilbrook is classed as part of the Codsall built-up area by the Office for National Statistics, but retains its own parish council. The village gets its name from billers (an old word for watercress), which grew in the local Moat Brook until recent times.

== Geography ==
The Moat Brook rises in Chillington Estate and Oaken Village, it runs into the River Penk in Pendeford Mill Nature Reserve. The river continues, where it joins the River Sow, which joins the River Trent which joins the Humber estuary and eventually flows into the North Sea near Grimsby, Lincolnshire. The village is connected to Wolverhampton by bus service 5 operated by Banga Bus Services 5 while the evening and Sunday journeys are operated by Chaserider. Banga also run a 5A between Wolverhampton and Codsall but this does not serve Bilbrook village centre. Service 5A was replaced by service X5 from 23 February 2025 running Mon-Fri.

== History ==
Prior to the 1850s Bilbrook was a small farming village composed mainly of the Estate of Bilbrook Manor, with its constituent farm workers cottages. The original village green was situated to the north of the existing green at the junction of Bilbrook Road and Joeys Lane, and was the location that the founder of the Methodist movement, John Wesley preached in 1745.

Bilbrook was historically part of the parish of Tettenhall. When elected parish and district councils were created in 1894 the built up part of Tettenhall was made an urban district and the rural part of the parish, including Bilbrook, became a separate parish called Wrottesley. Wrottesley parish was abolished in 1986, being split between two new parishes called Perton and Bilbrook, with some adjustments with the neighbouring parish of Codsall at the same time.

== Education and amenities ==
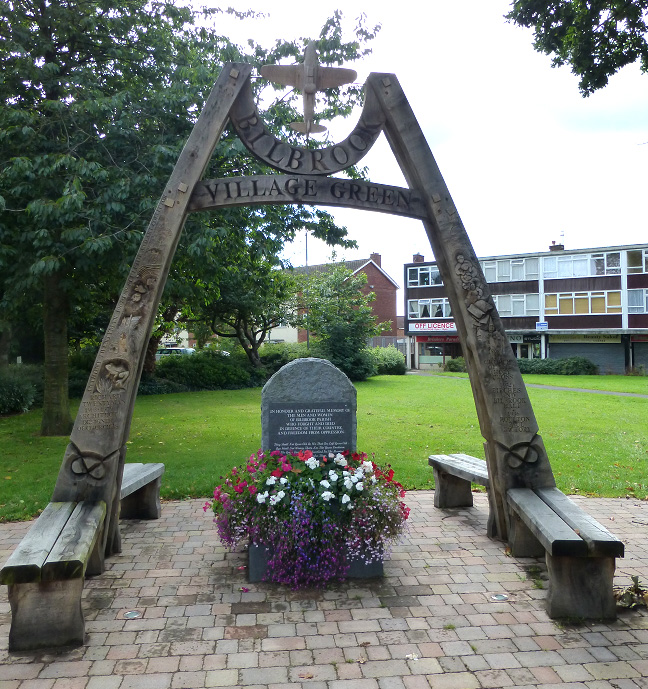
Bilbrook Village Green memorial arch

Bilbrook has a first school (Lane Green), a middle school (Bilbrook Middle) and a church (Holy Cross). Other features include The Woodman Inn public house and two rows of shops and stores.. Bilbrook's village green includes a war memorial, and a carved oak arch adorned with historical information about the local area. It has a yearly street fair on Easter Monday in the road outside the Church and is generally considered a safe place to live.

Bilbrook has a thriving community football club called Bilbrook Junior FC, which was founded in 1978 with the objective of providing local youngsters with the opportunity to enjoy playing football both in training and competitive matches, the club catering for 300 boys and girls from under 7s to under 18s. In December 2005 the club achieved "The FA Charter Standards Community Club" award. The club, based on Pendeford Lane with pitches off Wobaston Road in nearby Pendeford, has recently been told to vacate its Wobaston Road pitches as the land is needed as part of the i54 business park project.

== The Friends of Bilbrook ==
The Friends of Bilbrook was formed in 2011 by local residents who wanted to improve the open, green spaces in their village. Some of their many projects have included the fund raising and construction of a multi-use games area (MUGA) on the Twentyman's Playing Fields. They have also planted 1200 trees in a community wood called the Jubilee Wood which was planted to commemorate the Diamond Jubilee of Her Majesty Queen Elizabeth II. Recently they formed a partnership with Vinci Construction and Jaguar Land Rover for a Corporate Social Responsibility (CSR) project which included the installation of a wheelchair access gate, seating benches and information boards in the wood. They host local businesses for volunteer days carrying out maintenance and improvement works in the wood. In an annual project with Bilbrook Codsall Scouts they construct bird nesting boxes, bat roosting boxes and insect hotels. The wood is now brimming with wildlife including: bank vole, field vole, common shrew, wood mouse, grass snake, barn owl, tawny owl, common kestrel, common kingfisher, noctule bat, soprano and common pipistrelle bat. Bordering the Jubilee Wood to the North East is the Moat Brook. The group regularly carry out water health monitoring activities and record all their results through Waterside Care and the Environment Agency.

== Notable people ==
- Richard Twentyman (1903–1979), architect based in Wolverhampton.
- Jim Lea (born 1949), musician, most notable for playing bass guitar in Slade.

== Listed building ==
The parish contains one listed building, a milepost on the Shropshire Union Canal, designated at Grade II, the lowest of the three grades, which is applied to "buildings of national importance and special interest". The milepost is in cast iron, and consists of a T-shaped plate divided into three panels inscribed with the distances to Nantwich, Autherley Junction, and Norbury Junction.
