= St Andrew's Church, Wolverhampton =

St Andrew’s Church, Wolverhampton
- Church of St Andrew
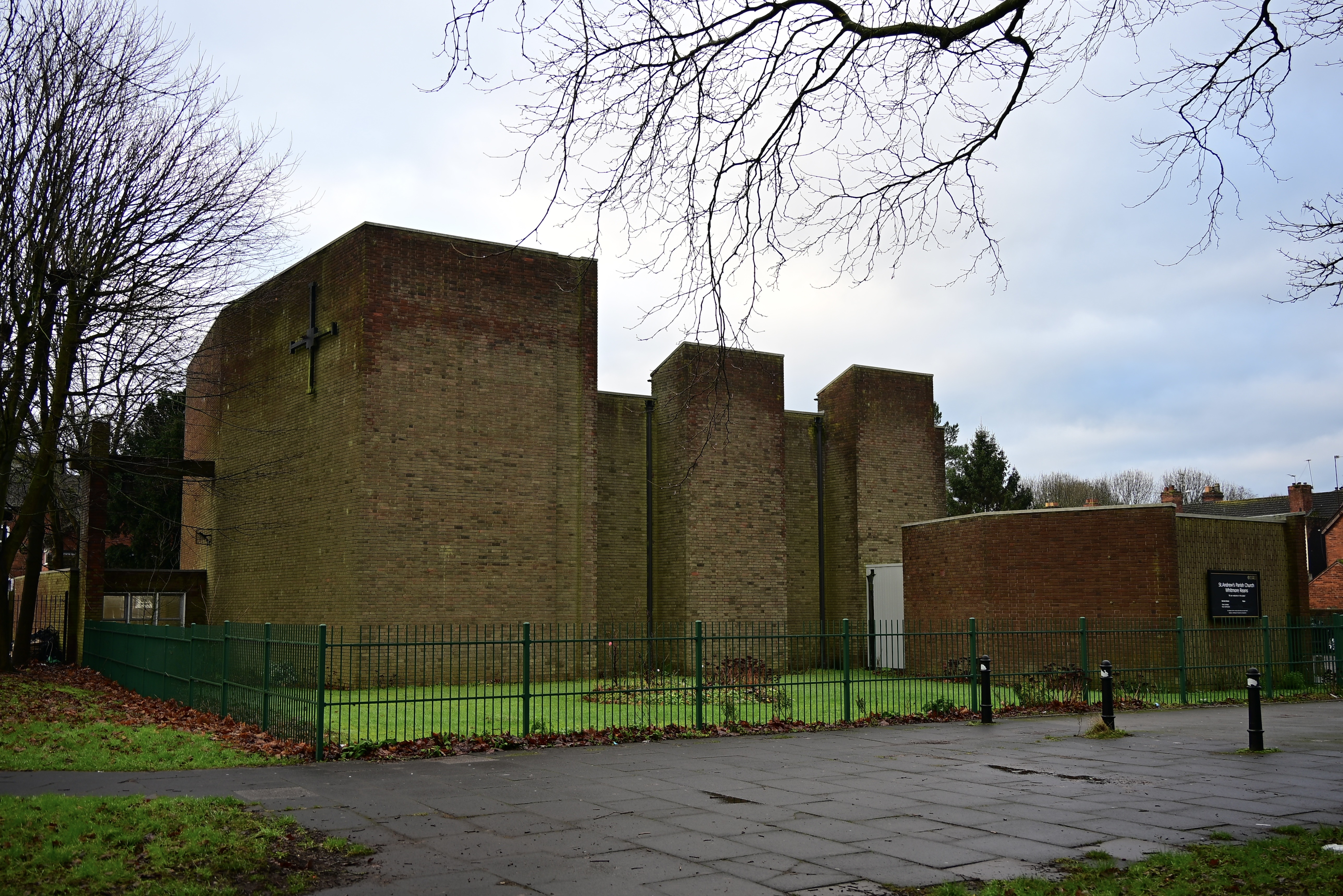
- St Andrew’s Church, Wolverhampton
- 52°35′40.1″N 2°8′39.3″W
- OS grid reference: SO 90325 99638
- Location: Wolverhampton
- Country: England
- Denomination: Church of England
- Website: Church website

History
- Dedication: St Andrew
- Consecrated: 15th September 1967

Architecture
- Functional status: Parish church
- Architect: Richard Twentyman
- Architectural type: Modernist

Administration
- Diocese: Diocese of Lichfield
- Archdeaconry: Walsall
- Deanery: Wolverhampton
- Parish: St Andrew Wolverhampton

St Andrew's Church is a Church of England parish church in Whitmore Reans, an inner suburb of the city of Wolverhampton, West Midlands, England. It is dedicated to Andrew the Apostle.

== History ==
As Wolverhampton expanded rapidly in the 19th century due to industrialisation, the once rural area of Whitmore Reans to the north west of the town began to be urbanised. To serve the religious needs of this new community, on 23 May 1865 the foundation stone of a new parish church dedicated to St Andrew was laid by the Rector of St Peter's Collegiate Church, John Hodgson Iles. The new building was designed by local architect Edward Banks in Early English Gothic Revival style. Construction was completed over the next five years ahead of consecration on 3 November 1870 by the Bishop of Lichfield, George Selwyn. Although Banks’s design called for a tower and spire, shortage of funds meant these elements were never realised. However the building was expanded to accommodate more parishioners between 1891 and 1892 by local architect F. T. Beck.

Bank’s church would serve the community for almost 94 years. However, tragedy struck on 31 May 1964 when the building was ruinously damaged by fire. Such was the destruction that the decision was taken to completely demolish the church and rebuild on the same site.

The commission for reconstructing the church was awarded to local architect Richard Twentyman in 1965. Without funds to rebuild on same grand scale, and in response to contemporary liturgical developments, Twentyman’s brick-built modernist design for the new church was radically different to what had preceded it. The foundation stone was laid on 17 September 1966 by the Bishop of Stafford, Richard Clitherow, although construction had actually begun sometime before. Reconsecration took place almost exactly one year later, on 15 September 1967 at a ceremony presided over by the Bishop of Lichfield, Stretton Reeve.

== Architecture ==
Twentyman’s modernist design for St Andrew’s Church is fortress-like in its external appearance. Nikolaus Pevsner described the church as blocky, of brick, and convincing in his 1974 survey of the buildings of Staffordshire.

Constructed in red brick on an essentially square plan, it has a slightly pointed east wall, a nave of two bays to north and south, and a sanctuary that extends in line with the bays. Two irregular-shaped vestries adjoin the sanctuary, and a hexagonal Lady Chapel is linked by a passageway. A single bell is suspended from a concrete beam between the sanctuary wall and a brick pillar to the east. A church hall stands to the west, with access to both spaces through a shared vestibule.

Twentyman designed the church with no windows facing out, possibly to muffle the sound of traffic noise, and instead deployed four hidden roof lights to north and south that fill the interior of the church with defuse light. This effect is enhanced by roughcast rendered walls that are painted white and largely undecorated.

On the north side of altar, set within east wall, is an arrangement of stones salvaged from the original church. The baptismal font was also rescued from the ruins of the original church. Twentyman himself was largely responsible for the other interior fittings, including the Portland stone altar and the nave pews, lectern, pulpit, candlesticks and font cover, all in African mahogany. The Stations of the Cross were executed in terracotta by Marguerite Paulins. In the Lady Chapel are pews, an altar, and two stained glass windows that were also rescued from the former church.

The foremost decorative element of the church is the expansive stained glass west window designed by John Piper and manufactured by Patrick Reyntiens. Installed in 1974, it is formed of seven individual rectangular glass panels that combine to depict a semi-abstract representation of the Sea of Galilee, representing St Andrew the Fisherman. Rectangles and circles in various blue shades of blue are embellished with black and white aquatic motifs such as waves, foam and fish.

== Gallery ==
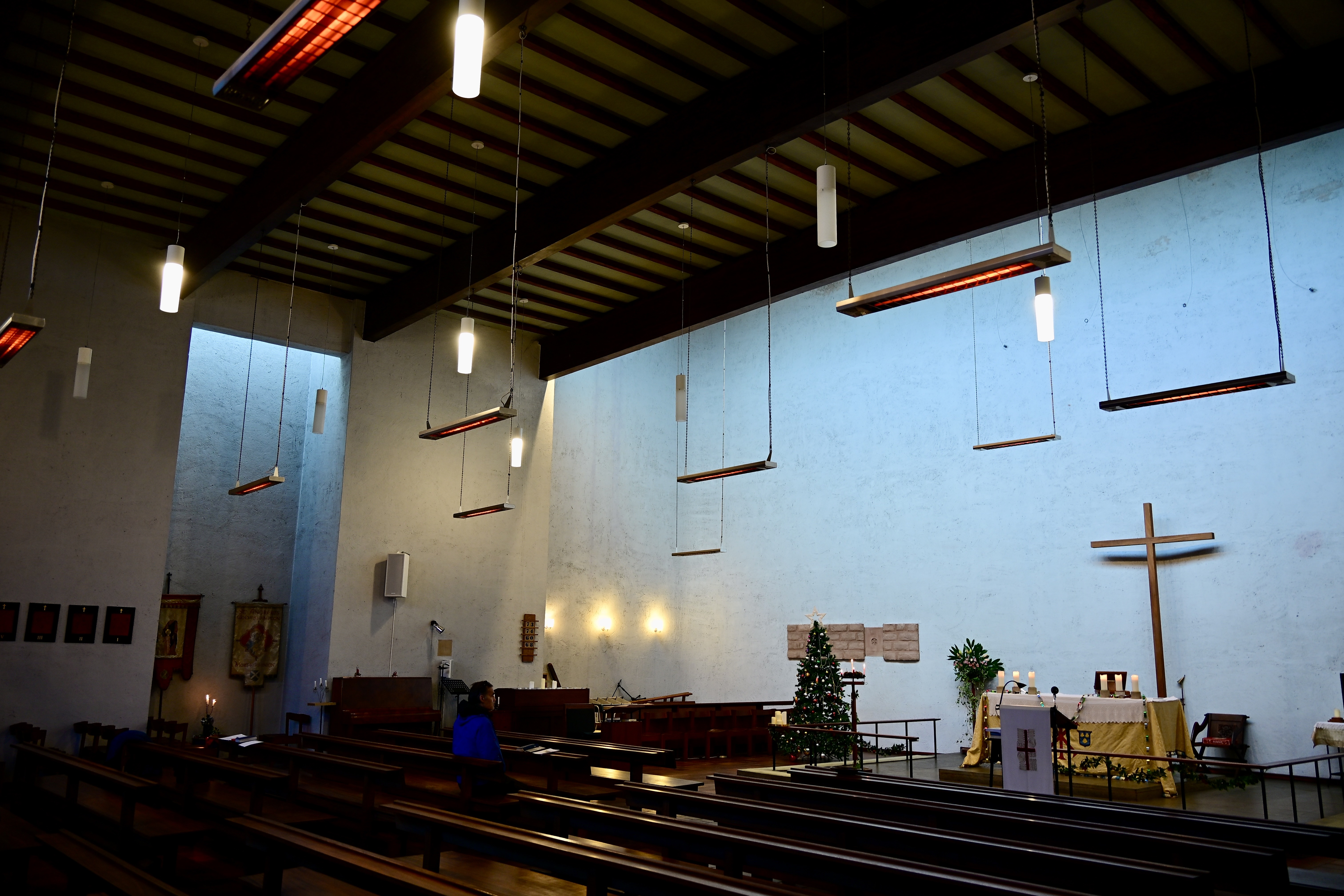
View of interior

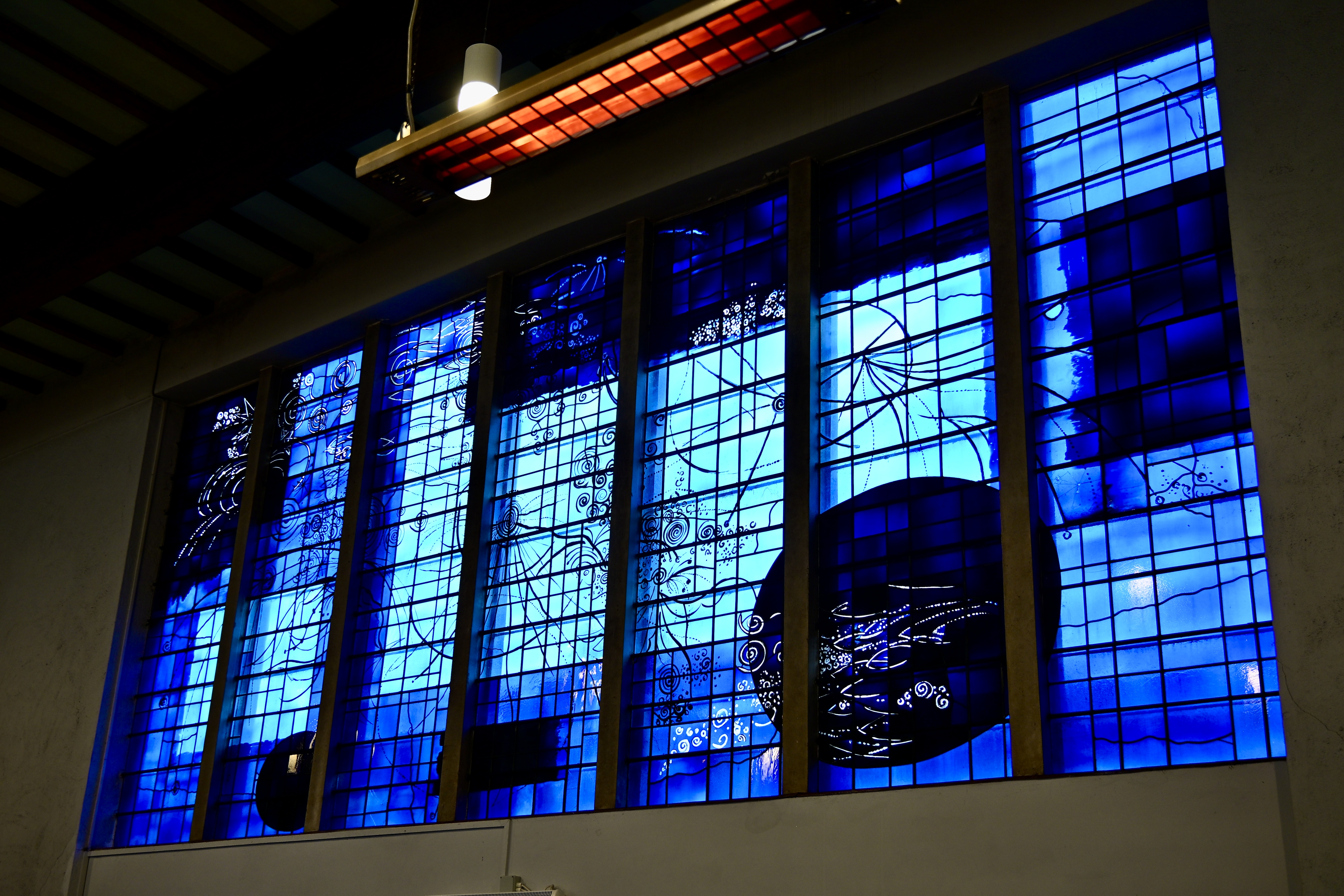
West window by John Piper

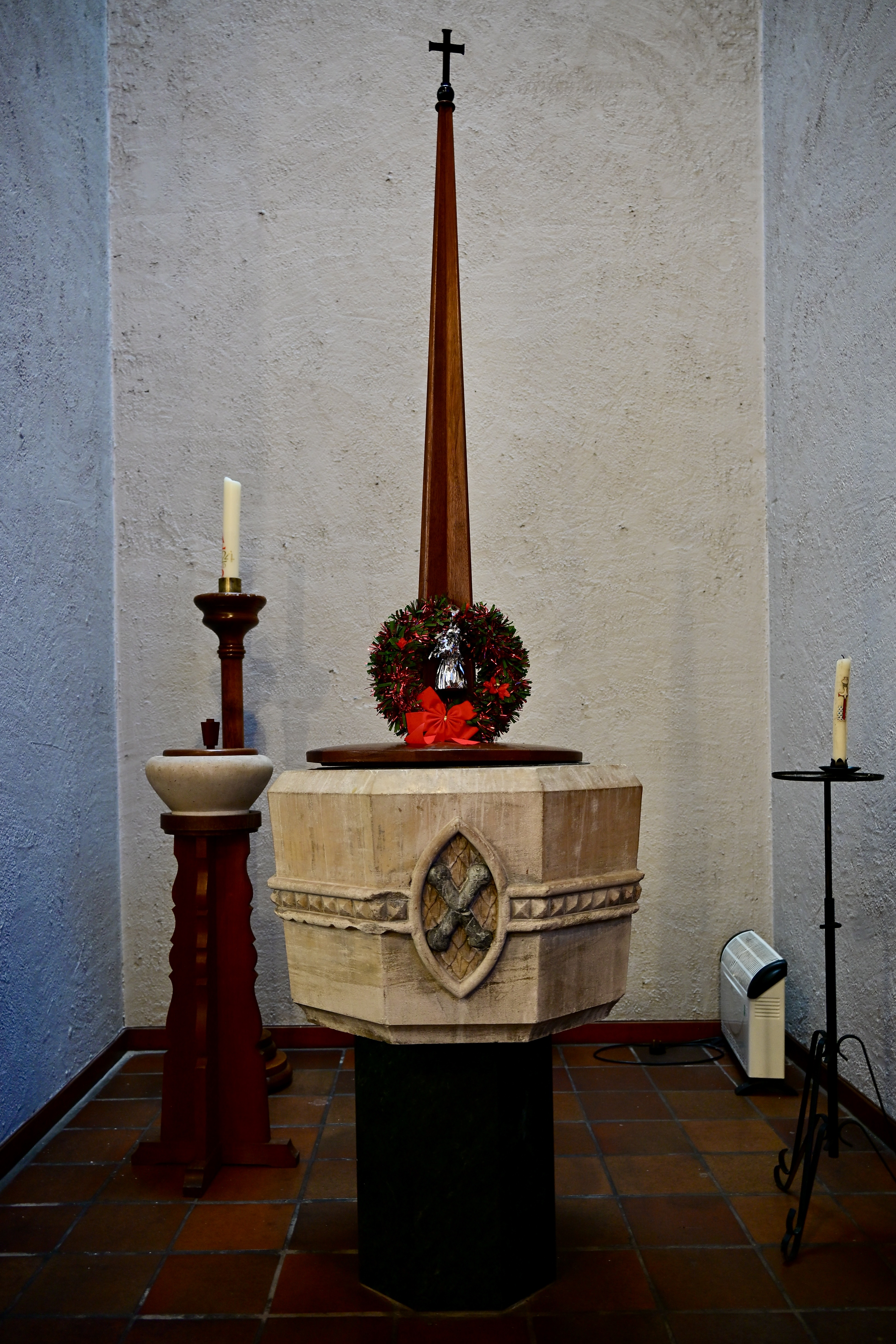
Baptismal font salvaged from previous church
