= Edward Perry =

Edward (or Ed or Eddie) Perry may refer to:

- Edward A. Perry (1831–1889), American Civil War general and later Governor of Florida
- Ed Perry (born 1974), American football player who played for the Miami Dolphins
- Eddie Perry (footballer) (1909–1996), Welsh international footballer and club manager
- Edward Perry Warren (1860–1928), American art collector and author
- Edward Perry (industrialist) (1800–1869), English industrialist and twice mayor of Wolverhampton
- Edward Perry (Scottish footballer) (born 1934), Scottish footballer
- George Edward Perry, known as Ted, English classical record producer, founder of Hyperion Records

== See also ==
- Edmund Perry, American student shot dead by a policeman
- Edwin Perry, New Zealand politician
