= Bantock =

Bantock is a surname. Notable people with the surname include:

- Albert Baldwin Bantock (1862–1938), English politician
- Granville Bantock (1868–1946), British classical composer
- Leedham Bantock (1870–1928), British singer and actor
- Nick Bantock (born 1949), British artist and writer
- Thomas Bantock (1823–1895), English businessman and politician

== See also ==
- Bantock House Museum and Park, museum in Wolverhampton, England
