= Hawksford =

Hawksford is a surname.

== Notable persons with that surname ==
- Daniel Hawksford, Welsh actor.
- John Hawksford (1806–1887), solicitor, benefactor, served as 15th Mayor of Wolverhampton 1863/64 and became the first Roman Catholic to do so.
