= St Paul's Church, Wood Green =

Church of St Paul
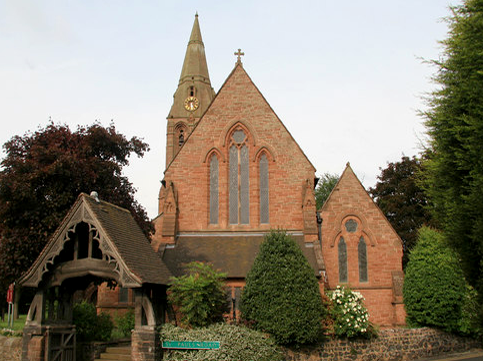
- Church of St Paul
- 52°33′45.78″N 2°00′18.69″W
- OS grid reference: SO 99745 96098
- Location: Wednesbury, West Midlands
- Country: England
- Denomination: Church of England
- Website: paulandluke.co.uk

History
- Consecrated: 1874

Architecture
- Heritage designation: Grade II
- Designated: 29 September 1987

Administration
- Diocese: Lichfield

St Paul's Church is an Anglican church in the Wood Green district of Wednesbury, West Midlands, England. The parish of Wood Green is part of the Wednesbury Deanery in the Diocese of Lichfield. The building is Grade II listed.

== History and description ==
The church was built in 1874, by the Elwell family, owners of Wednesbury Forge, at a cost of £5.000. The company was interested in the welfare of its workforce, also converting former workshops into housing, and developing sports facilities. The parish of Wood Green was formed in 1875. The Church of the Good Shepherd at The Delves, built in 1850, a chapel of ease formerly for St Bartholomew in Wednesbury, was transferred to St Paul; it closed in 1936.

The foundation stone was laid on 1 May 1872 by Alfred Elwell, head of the company since 1869, and the completed church was consecrated by the Bishop of Lichfield on 21 August 1874. The tower and spire were added in 1887, and eight bells were cast for the tower in that year by Taylor's of Loughborough.

The church is built of red sandstone, and is in Decorated style. There is a chancel, a nave with a clerestory, and north and south aisles, each of three bays.

=== Interior ===
There are stained glass windows given in memory of people connected with the church in the late 19th and early 20th century. The east window, presented in 1883, is a memorial to Edwin Richards, a local factory owner. A window in the north aisle was presented in 1919 by Edward Elwell Ltd, in memory of employees killed in the Great War. The font, of Caen stone and Irish marble, dates from 1888. There is a stone reredos, by Bridgeman of Lichfield, installed in 1903 in memory of Alfred Elwell. The wrought iron rood screen is a memorial to Rev. George Tuthill, vicar from 1875 to 1902.

=== St Luke's Church ===
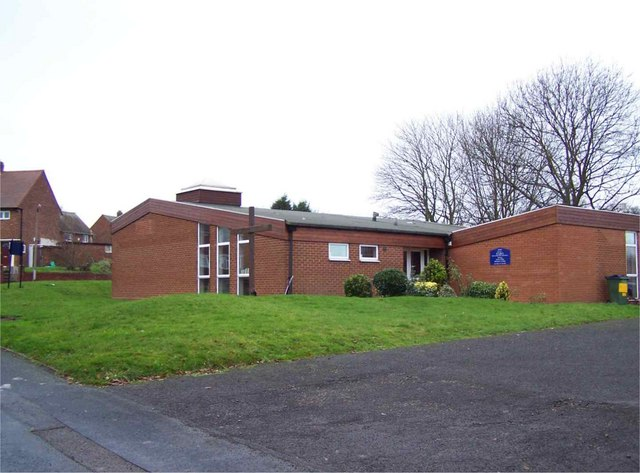
St Luke's Church

St Luke's Church, in Alma Street, Mesty Croft (52°33′16.6″N 2°00′21.6″W), is also in Wood Green parish. Originally an elementary school belonging to Edward Elwell, it was formed in 1879 as a mission church to St Paul's. It was rebuilt in 1894, and was replaced by a new church in 1973.
