= Cornelius Whitehouse =

English engineer and inventor

Cornelius Whitehouse (22 July 1795 – 7 August 1883) was an English engineer, businessman and inventor of a method of manufacturing tubes cheaply and accurately.

== Life ==
Whitehouse was born in Oldbury (now in West Midlands), son of Edward Whitehouse, a sword manufacturer. Demand for swords was high during the Napoleonic Wars, but later declined. He gave up the craft he learned from his father and moved to Wednesbury, where he worked in the forge works of Edward Elwell.

At that time there was a demand for gas pipes for street lighting. Tubes were made by heating a strip of iron (a skelp), the sides of which were overlapped and hammered to form a weld. Whitehouse in 1824 and 1825 developed a less labour-intensive method, in which a strip, drawn from the furnace by a chain, passed through a pair of semi-circular dies. Longer lengths of tube could be made, and the dies produced an accurately-shaped tube; the cost of production was reduced.

=== With James Russell ===
With the help of James Russell, a tube manufacturer in Wednesbury, Whitehouse was granted a patent for his invention on 26 February 1825. An obituarist wrote in 1883 in The Engineer: "The invention was of the greatest importance, and may be said to have laid the foundation of the welded tube trade."

An arrangement was made by which Russell employed Whitehouse, who received an annuity for the life of the patent, and a house, the patent rights being eventually assigned to Russell. Russell built a new factory, and tubes were produced in large numbers. There was litigation by Whitehouse and Russell when a method was patented in which tubes were welded by drawing them through grooved rollers: this was eventually decided by the courts to be an infringement of Whitehouse's patent. The affair lasted many years, and legal costs were high.

=== Later career ===
Whitehouse left Russell's company, and established in 1845 the Globe Works in Wednesbury, manufacturing tubes. He took out a patent in 1845 for the construction of welding and hammering machines for making tubes and gun barrels. The business did not thrive, and it eventually closed in the depression that began in the 1870s. Meanwhile a business partnership with Edwin Dixon, who had a tube factory in Wolverhampton, was not successful.

He married three times, and had two sons and three daughters. His nephew John Brotherton founded a successful tube manufacturing business and became Mayor of Wolverhampton. Whitehouse died in 1883, at the home of his son Denham Whitehouse in Wolverhampton, where he was living. The obituarist in The Engineer commented: "... the benefits Mr Whitehouse conferred upon all countries through his invention did not leave his latter days with such substantial means as the importance of the industry he created ought to have afforded him."
