= Ironmonger (disambiguation) =

An ironmonger is one who deals in metal goods, including tools and hardware.

Ironmonger may also refer to:

Places

- Ironmonger Lane, street in the City of London
- Ironmonger Row Baths, public washhouse in Islington, London

People

- Bert Ironmonger (1882–1971), Australian cricketer
- Duncan Ironmonger (born 1931), Australian economist
- John Ironmonger (footballer) (born 1961), Australian rules footballer
- John Ironmonger (writer) (born 1954), British writer
- Moses Ironmonger (1809–1887), English industrialist and mayor

Fictional characters

- Iron Monger, an identity used by several Marvel supervillains

Other

- Worshipful Company of Ironmongers, a livery company of the City of London
