= Wednesbury =

Town in West Midlands, England

Coordinates: 52.552°N 2.019°W

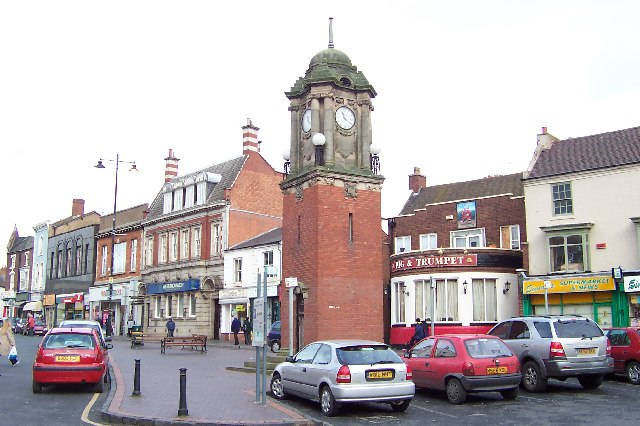
- Wednesbury High Street

- Location within the West Midlands
- Population: 20,313 (2021 Census BUA Profile)
- OS grid reference: SO9895
  - London: 108 miles
- Metropolitan borough: Sandwell
- Metropolitan county: West Midlands
- Region: West Midlands
- Country: England
- Sovereign state: United Kingdom
- Post town: WEDNESBURY
- Postcode district: WS10
- Dialling code: 0121
- Police: West Midlands
- Fire: West Midlands
- Ambulance: West Midlands
- UK Parliament: Tipton and Wednesbury

Wednesbury (/ˈwɛnzbəri/ locally [ˈwɛnzbriː]) is a market town in the Sandwell district, in the county of the West Midlands, England; it was historically in Staffordshire. It is located near the source of the River Tame and is part of the Black Country. Wednesbury is situated five miles (eight kilometres) southeast of Wolverhampton, three miles (five kilometres) southwest of Walsall and seven miles (eleven kilometres) northwest of Birmingham. At the 2021 Census, the town's built-up area had a population of 20,313.

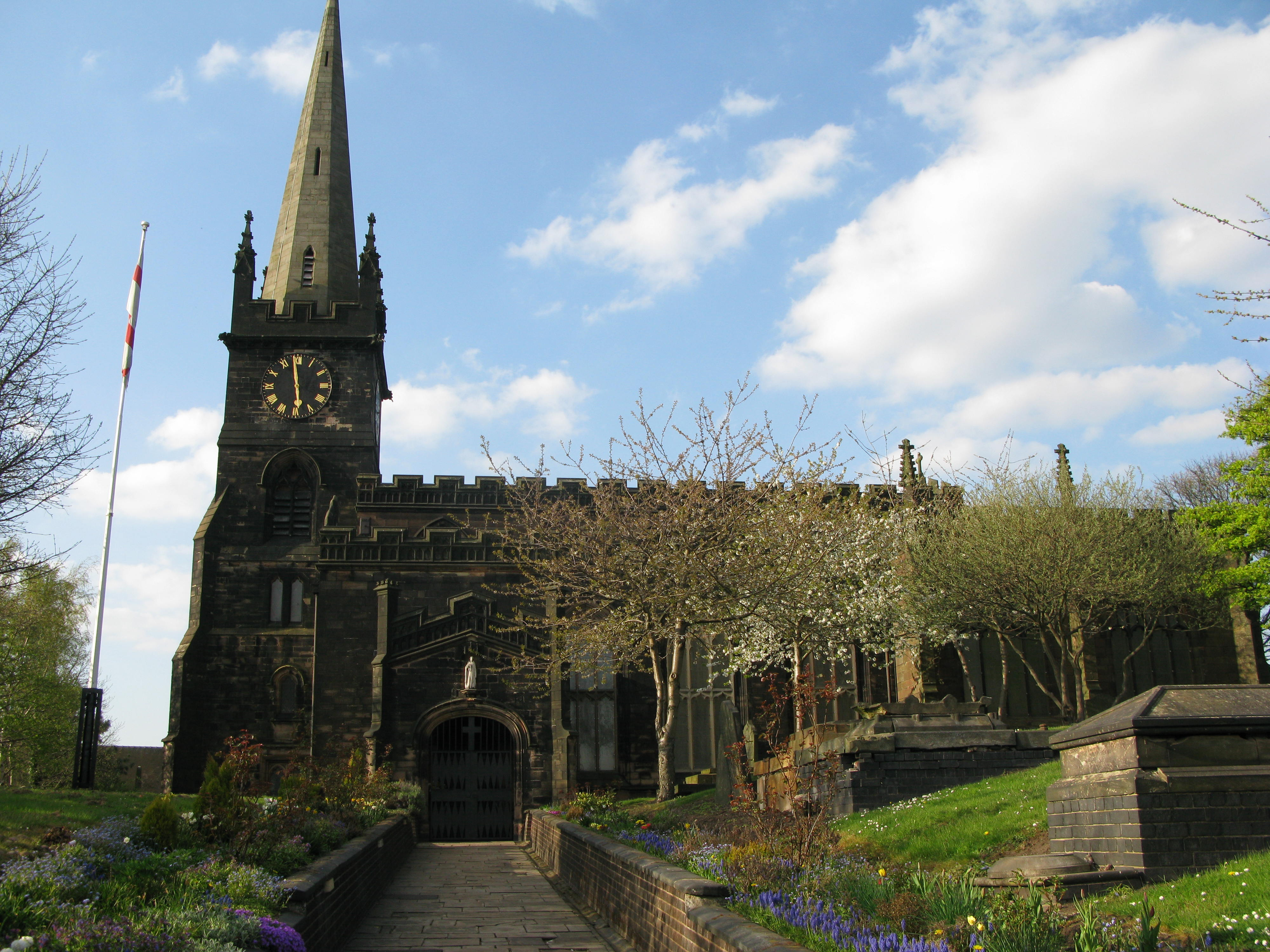
St Bartholomew's Church, Wednesbury

== History ==
=== Medieval and earlier ===
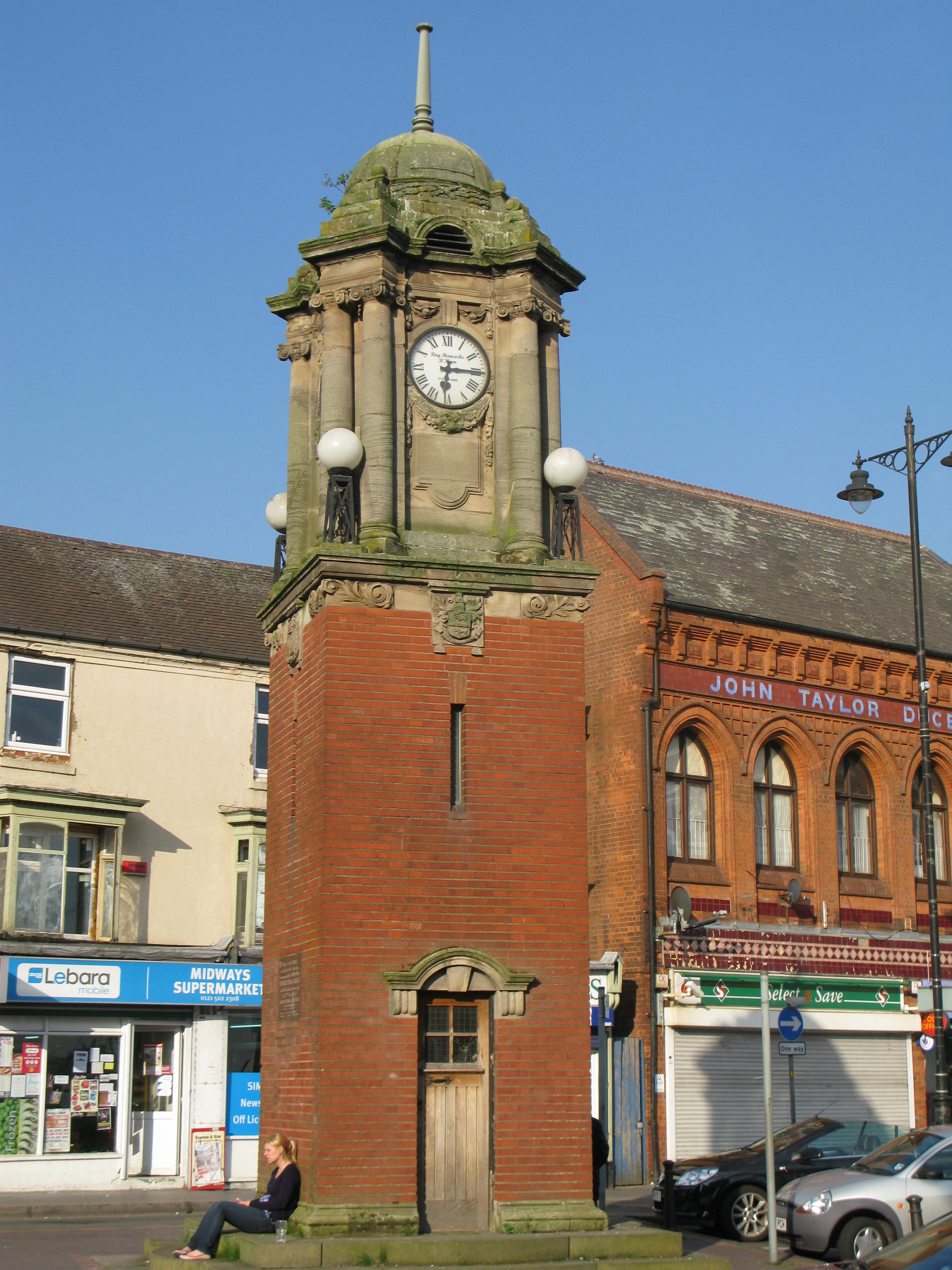
Wednesbury Clock Tower, built for the coronation of George V in 1911

The substantial remains of a large ditch excavated in St Mary's Road in 2008, following the contours of the hill and predating the Early Medieval period, has been interpreted as part of a hilltop enclosure and possibly the Iron Age hillfort long suspected on the site. The first authenticated spelling of the name was Wodensbyri, written in an endorsement on the back of the copy of the will of Wulfric Spot, dated 1004. Wednesbury ("Woden's borough") is one of a number of places in England to be named after the pre-Christian deity Woden, the leader of the Old English pantheon.

During the Anglo-Saxon period there are believed to have been two battles fought in Wednesbury, in 592 and 715. According to The Anglo-Saxon Chronicle there was "a great slaughter" in 592 and "Ceawlin was driven out". Ceawlin was a king of Wessex and the second Bretwalda, or overlord of all Britain. The 715 battle was between Mercia (of which Wednesbury was part) and the kingdom of Wessex. Both sides allegedly claimed to have won the battle, although it is believed that the victory inclined to Wessex.

Wednesbury was fortified by Æthelflæd (Ethelfleda), daughter of Alfred the Great and known as the Lady of Mercia. She erected five fortifications to defend against the Danes at Bridgnorth, Tamworth, Stafford and Warwick, with Wednesbury in the centre. Wednesbury's fort would probably have been an extension of an older fortification and made of a stone foundation with a wooden stockade above. Earthwork ramparts and water filled ditches would probably have added to its strength. A plaque on the gardens between Ethelfleda Terrace and St Bartholomew's church states that the gardens there – created in the 1950s – used stone from the graff, or fighting platform, of the old fort. Exploration of the gardens reveals several dressed stones, which appear to be those referred to on the plaque.

In 1086, the Domesday Book describes Wednesbury (Wadnesberie) as being a thriving rural community encompassing Bloxwich and Shelfield (now part of Walsall). During the Middle Ages the town was a rural village, with each family farming a strip of land with nearby heath being used for grazing. The town was held by the king until the reign of Henry II, when it passed to the Heronville family.

Medieval Wednesbury was very small, and its inhabitants would appear to have been farmers and farm workers. In 1315, coal pits were first recorded, which led to an increase in the number of jobs. Nail making was also in progress during these times. William Paget was born in Wednesbury in 1505, the son of a nail maker. He became Secretary of State, a Knight of the Garter and an Ambassador. He was one of executors of the will of Henry VIII.

=== Post-Medieval ===
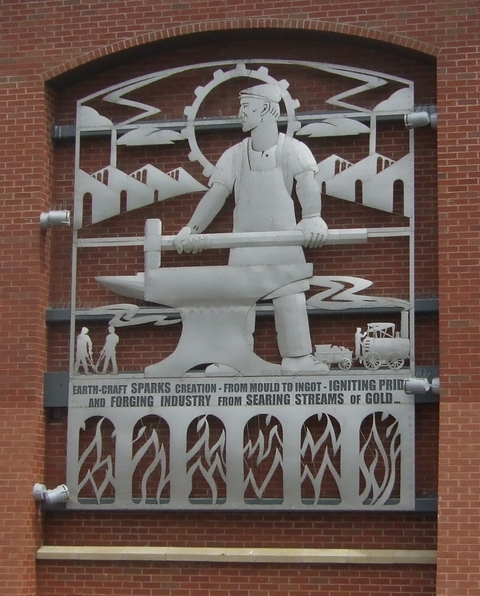
An art installation on a local supermarket celebrating the town's industrial past

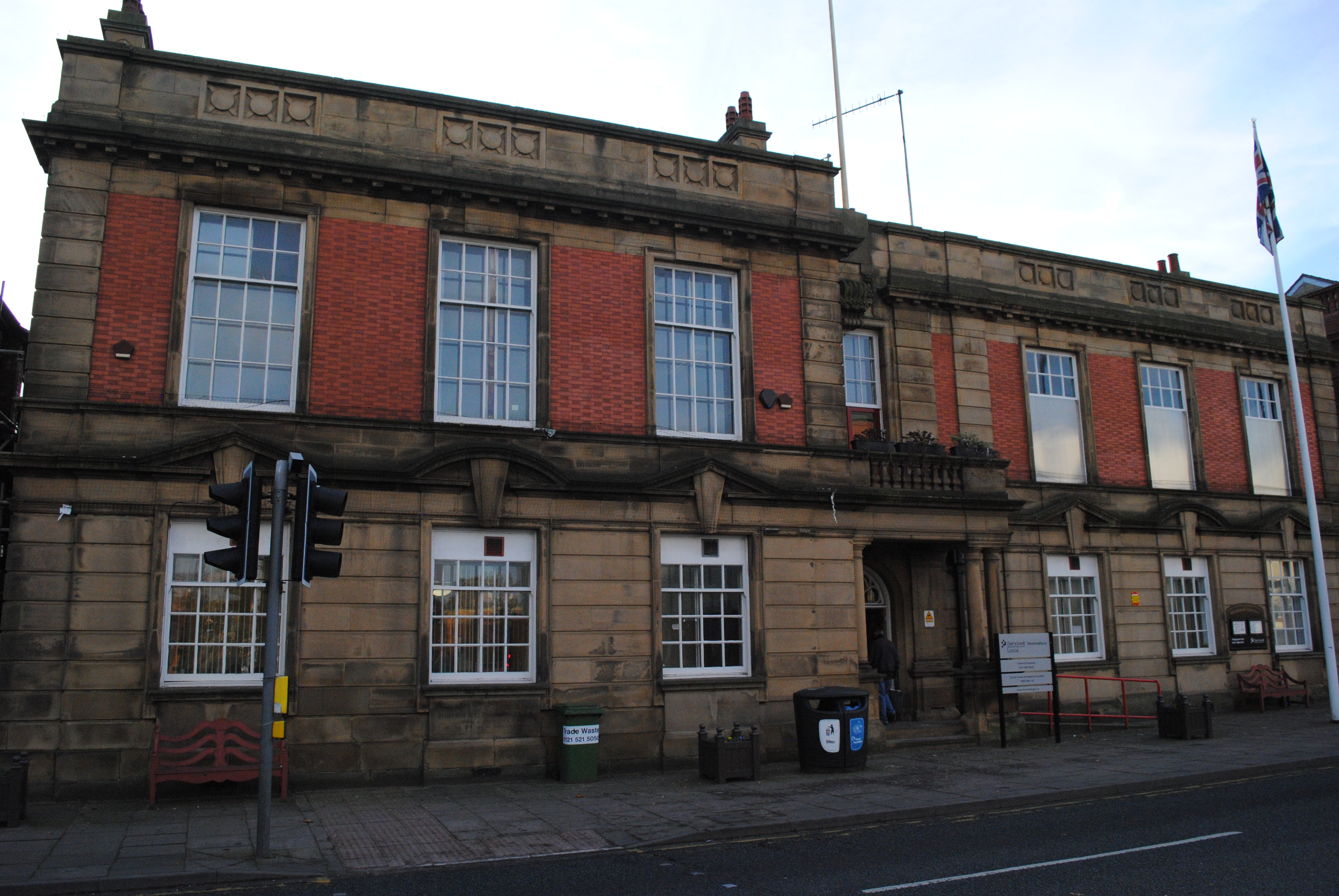
Wednesbury Town Hall

In the 17th century Wednesbury pottery – "Wedgbury ware" – was being sold as far away as Worcester, while white clay from Monway Field was used to make tobacco pipes.

By the 18th century the main occupations were coal mining and nail making. With the introduction of the first turnpike road in 1727 and the development of canals and later the railways came a big increase in population. In 1769 the first Birmingham Canal was cut to link Wednesbury's coalfields to the Birmingham industries. The canal banks were soon full of factories.

In 1743, the Wesleys and their new Methodist movement were severely tested. Early in the year, John and Charles Wesley preached in the open air on the Tump. They were warmly received and made welcome by the vicar. Soon afterwards another preacher came and was rude about the current state of the Anglican clergy. This angered the vicar, and the magistrates published a notice ordering that any further preachers were to be brought to them. When Wesley next came his supporters were still there but a crowd of others heckled him and threw stones. Later the crowd came to his lodgings and took him to the magistrates, but they declined to have anything to do with Wesley or the crowd. The crowd ill-treated Wesley and nearly killed him but he remained calm. Eventually they came to their senses and returned him to his hosts.

Soon afterward, the vicar asked his congregation to pledge not to associate with Methodists, and some who refused to pledge had their windows smashed. Others who hosted Methodist meetings had the contents of their houses destroyed. This terrible episode came to an end in December when the vicar died. After that mainstream Anglican and Methodist relations were generally cordial. Methodism grew strongly and Wesley visited often, almost until his death. Francis Asbury, Richard Whatcoat and the Earl of Dartmouth are among those who attended Methodist meetings, all to have a profound effect on the United States.

In 1887, Brunswick Park was opened to celebrate Queen Victoria's Golden Jubilee.

=== 20th and 21st centuries ===
==== First World War ====
On the evening of 31 January 1916, Wednesbury was hit by one of the first wave of German Zeppelins aimed at Britain during the First World War. Joseph Smith and his three children were killed in their house in the King Street area. His wife survived, having left the house to investigate the cause of a loud noise at a nearby factory, caused by the first bombs falling.

==== Council housing ====
The first council houses in Wednesbury were built in the early 1920s, but progress was slow compared to nearby towns including Tipton and West Bromwich. By 1930, a mere 206 families had been rehoused from slums. However, the building of council houses quickened at the start of the 1930s; the 1,000th council house was occupied before the end of 1931. By 1935, some 1,250 older houses had been demolished or earmarked for demolition. By 1944 there were more than 3,000 council properties; by 1959, more than 5,000. The largest development in Wednesbury was the Hateley Heath estate in the late 1940s and early 1950s, which straddled the border of Wednesbury and West Bromwich.

==== Cinema ====
In 1947, the Corporation granted a licence for the operation of a cinema, on the condition that no children under 15 were to be admitted on Sundays. The cinema operator challenged this decision in court, claiming that the imposition of the condition was outside the corporation's powers. The court used this case to establish a general test for overturning the decision of a public body in this type of case, which is now known as "Wednesbury unreasonableness".

==== Local government ====
Wednesbury was historically in Staffordshire, a part of the Hundred of Offlow.

Wednesbury was incorporated as a municipal borough, with its headquarters at Wednesbury Town Hall, in 1886, the district contained only the civil parish of Wednesbury, on 1 April 1966 the district was abolished and merged with the County Borough of West Bromwich and the County Borough of Walsall. The parish was also abolished on 1 April 1966 and merged with West Bromwich and Walsall. In 1961 the parish had a population of 34,511. The borough of Wednesbury ceased to exist in 1966. Much of its area was absorbed into West Bromwich and small parts went into the County Borough of Walsall. The Wednesbury section of Hateley Heath was absorbed into West Bromwich, and Wednesbury gained the Friar Park estate from West Bromwich. The Dangerfield Lane estate (developed during the interwar and early postwar years) was absorbed into Darlaston, which was now part of an expanded Walsall borough. In 1974 West Bromwich amalgamated with Warley (i.e. Oldbury, Rowley Regis and Smethwick) to form the present-day borough of Sandwell. Wednesbury has the postcode WS10, shared with Darlaston in the borough of Walsall.

King's Hill, to the north west of the town centre was a settlement and ward of the Borough of Wednesbury. St Andrew's Mission Church, a Chapel of Ease to Wednesbury parish church was consecrated in 1894. A recreation ground was opened in 1900. On 1 April 1966, under local government reorganisation, King's Hill was placed in the County Borough of Walsall.

==== Post-industrial ====
During the 1970s and 1980s, Wednesbury's traditional industry declined and unemployment rose. For well over 100 years, Wednesbury was dominated by the huge Patent Shaft steel works, which opened during the 19th century and closed in 1980. The factory was demolished in 1983, and within a decade had been developed for light industry and services. The iron gates of the factory still exist and are mounted on the traffic island at Holyhead Road and Dudley Street.

Since 1990 new developments such as a new light industrial estate, a retail park and the pedestrian-only Union Street have given a new look to the town. The traditional market is still a feature of the bustling centre, and the streets around Market Place are now a protected conservation area.

==== Retail park ====
In the late 1980s, land near junction 9 of the M6 motorway was designated as the location for a retail development. Swedish furniture retailer Ikea was the first to move in; its superstore opened in January 1991. In the 1990s the retail park grew to include several more large units, but most of these were empty by 2009 due to the recession. However, most of the units were occupied again by 2012 and the retail is home to numerous retailers. The retail park was expanded in 2017 with the construction of more retail units and 'eateries', and the car park was remodelled to create more parking spaces.

==== Tragedies ====
Wednesbury was the scene of two major tragedies during the second half of the 20th century. On 21 December 1977, four siblings aged between 4 and 12 years died in a house fire in School Road, Friar Park, at the height of the national firefighters strike. The house was demolished soon afterwards, leaving a gap in a terrace of council houses. On 24 September 1984, four pupils and a teacher from Stuart Bathurst RC High School were killed when their minibus was struck by a roll of steel which fell from the back of a lorry, on Wood Green Road close to the park keepers house.

=== Transport history ===
Wednesbury was first connected to the rail network in the mid-19th century, and has been served by heavy and light rail for all but six years since then.

The South Staffordshire Line between Walsall and Stourbridge served Wednesbury until 1993. Passenger services were withdrawn after Wednesbury railway station closed in 1964 under the Beeching Axe, but a steel terminal soon opened on the site and did not close until December 1992, with the railway closing on 19 March 1993 after serving the town for some 150 years.

Until 1972, the town was served by the former Great Western Railway line between Birmingham and Wolverhampton at Wednesbury Central station. Passenger trains were withdrawn at this time, with Wednesbury-Birmingham section of the line through West Bromwich closing. The Bilston-Wolverhampton section survived for another decade before closing over the winter of 1982/83. The final section between Wednesbury and Bilston, serving a scrapyard at Bilston, remained open until 30 August 1992, before the line was closed to allow for the creation of the Midland Metro, which opened in May 1999.

A steam tram service opened to Dudley, also serving Tipton, on 21 January 1884. The line was electrified in 1907 but discontinued in March 1930 on its replacement by Midland Red buses.

The town's current bus station was opened in the autumn of 2004 on the site of its predecessor.

== Oakeswell Hall ==
Second in importance to Wednesbury manor house was Oakeswell Hall, built c. 1421 by William Byng. The property descended to the family of Jennyns. By 1662 the house was known as Okeswell or Hopkins New Hall Place (it being adjacent to the Hopkins family's New Hall Fields). Richard Parkes, a Quaker ironmaster, bought it in 1707 and moved in the following year. During the late 18th and early 19th centuries it was a farmhouse. Between 1825 and 1962 it had several different owners, including Joseph Smith (the first town clerk) who greatly restored it. In 1962 it was demolished.

Dr Walter Chancellor Garman (1860–1923), a general practitioner, and his wife Margaret Frances Magill lived at Oakeswell Hall. Their children included the Garman sisters who were associated with the Bloomsbury group. There were nine children, seven sisters and two brothers: Mary (1898), Sylvia (1899), Kathleen (1901), Douglas (1903), Rosalind (1904), Helen (1906), Mavin (1907), Ruth (1909) and Lorna (1911).

== Demography ==
At the 2021 census, Wednesbury's built-up area population was recorded as having a population of 20,313. Of the findings, the ethnicity and religious composition of the wards separately were:

Wednesbury: Ethnicity (2021 Census)
Ethnic group	Population	%
White	15,594	76.7%
Asian or Asian British	3,109	15.3%
Black or Black British	713	3.5%
Mixed	591	2.9%
Other Ethnic Group	229	1.1%
Arab	82	0.3%
Total	20,313	100%

The religious composition of the built-up area at the 2021 Census was recorded as:

Wednesbury: Religion (2021 Census)
Religious	Population	%
Christian	9,657	50.1%
Irreligious	6,389	33.1%
Muslim	2,008	10.4%
Sikh	673	3.5%
Hindu	424	2.2%
Other religion	80	0.4%
Buddhist	52	0.3%
Jewish	1	0.1%
Total	20,313	100%

== Transport ==
=== Roads ===
Wednesbury is on Thomas Telford's London to Holyhead road, built in the early 19th century. The section between Wednesbury and Moxley was widened in 1997 to form a dual carriageway, completing the Black Country Spine Road that had been in development since 1995 when the route between Wednesbury and West Bromwich had opened, along with a one-mile (1.5-kilometre) route to the north of Moxley linking with the Black Country Route. The original plan was for a completely new route between Wednesbury and Moxley, but this was abandoned as part of cost-cutting measures, as were the planned grade-separated junctions, which were abandoned in favour of conventional roundabouts.

=== Buses ===
The bus station, rebuilt in 2004, is in the town centre near the swimming baths. It facilitates links to Wolverhampton, West Bromwich, Walsall and Dudley, where connections can be made to the Merry Hill Shopping Centre and Birmingham

=== Railways ===
Since 1999, Wednesbury has been served by the West Midlands Metro light rail tram system, with stops at Great Western Street and Wednesbury Parkway. It runs from Wolverhampton to Birmingham; the maintenance depot is also here.

Wednesbury's rail links are set to improve further with the completion of a new Metro tram line running to Brierley Hill, via Tipton and Dudley, making use of the disused South Staffordshire Line. Originally planned to open in 2023, the project was put back due to lack of funds and is now being built in two parts with part one (to Dudley) now expected to open in August 2026. The completion of the extension depends upon funds being available.

== Districts ==
- Church Hill: near the town centre, is notable for being the location of St Bartholomew's Church.
- Brunswick: to the immediate north of the town centre, was mostly built at the start of the 20th century around Brunswick Park.
- Friar Park: originally in West Bromwich, it was built in the late 1920s and early 1930s.
- Myvod Estate: approximatelyone mile (1.5 kilometres) to the north of the town centre towards the border with Walsall, was built in the 1920s as Wednesbury's first major council housing development.
- Wood Green: situated around the A461 road northwards in the direction of Walsall. Landmarks include Stuart Bathurst RC High School, and on the opposite site of the road is Wood Green Academy. The parish church is St Paul's. Since 1990, a large retail development has sprung upon around Wood Green, extending to the site of the former FH Lloyd steel plant in Park Lane.
- Golf Links: mostly built in the 1940s and 1950s with both private and council housing, in the south of the town.
- Woods Estate: to the north-east of the town centre, was built mostly as council housing between 1930 and 1962.

== Wards ==
- Wednesbury North : Wednesbury Central, Wood Green & Old Park
- Wednesbury South : Hill Top, Ocker Hill (part), Golf Links, Millfields, Harvills Hawthorn
- Friar Park : Woods & Mesty Croft, Friar Park

== Media ==
Local news and television programmes are provided by BBC West Midlands and ITV Central. Television signals are received from the Sutton Coldfield TV transmitter.

Local radio stations are BBC Radio WM, Heart West Midlands, Smooth West Midlands, Hits Radio Black Country & Shropshire, Greatest Hits Radio Birmingham & The West Midlands, Greatest Hits Radio Black Country & Shropshire and Black Country Radio, a community based station.

The town is served by the local newspapers, Wednesbury Herald and Express & Star.

== Public amenities ==
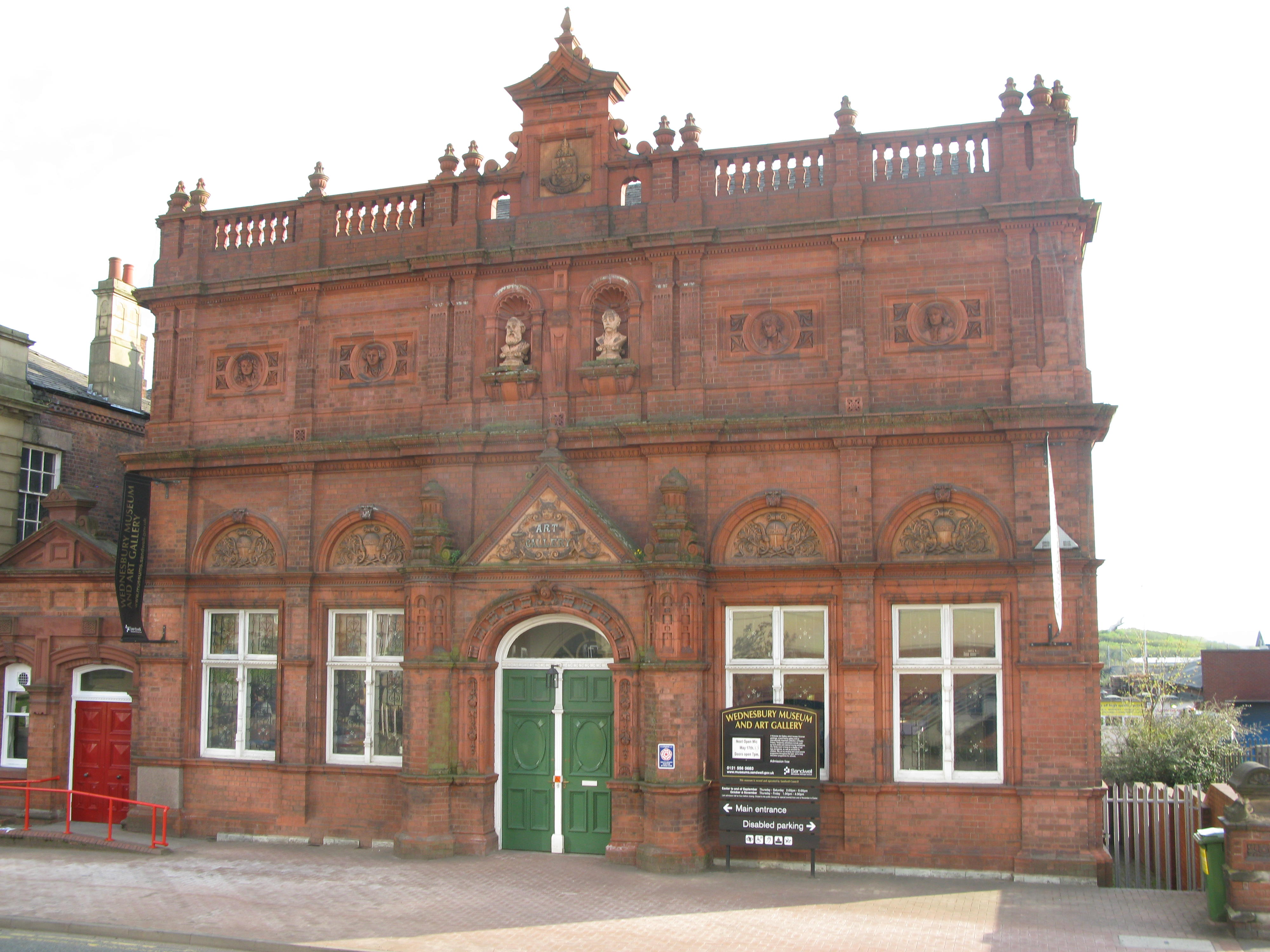
Wednesbury Museum and Art Gallery

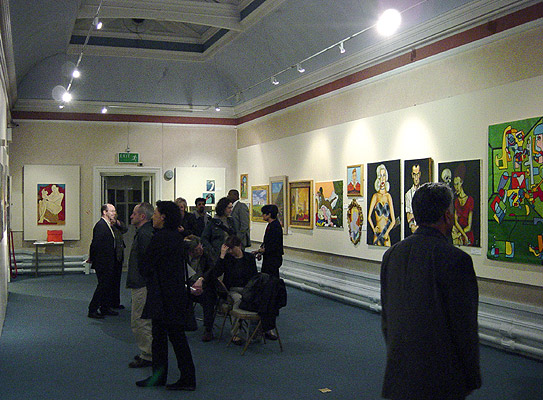
The Stuckist show at Wednesbury, 2003

In 2003, Wednesbury Museum and Art Gallery staged Stuck in Wednesbury, the first show in a public gallery of the Stuckism international art movement.

The archives for Wednesbury Borough are held at Sandwell Community History and Archives Service in Smethwick.

== Schools ==
- Tameside Primary Academy
- Park Hill Primary School
- St Mary’s Roman Catholic Primary School
- Old Park Primary School
- St John's Primary Academy
- Stuart Bathurst Catholic High School
- Wodensborough Ormiston Academy
- Wood Green Academy
- Mesty Croft Academy

== Notable people ==
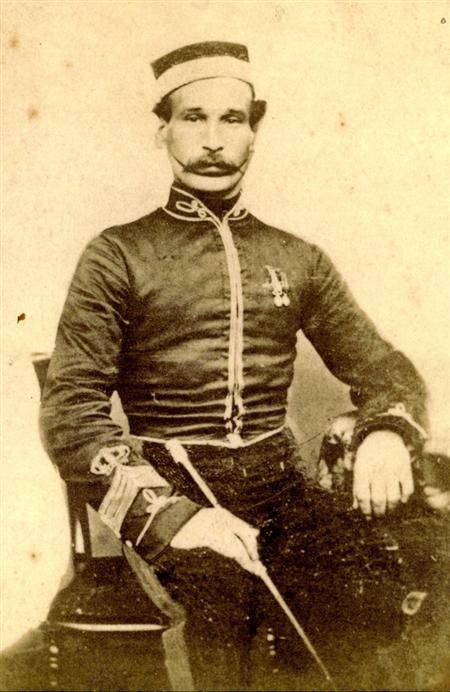
John Ashley Kilvert, 1856

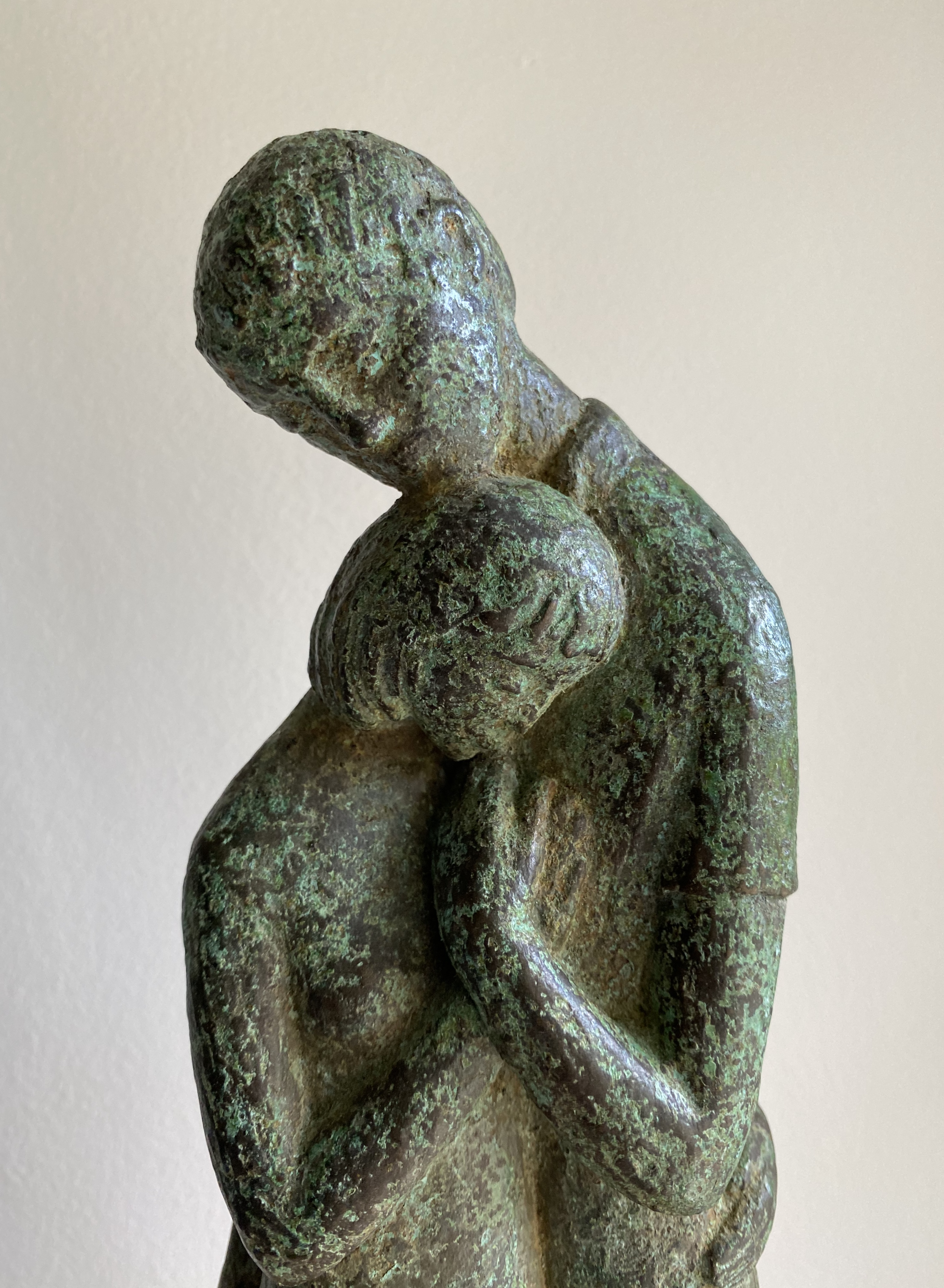
Bronze sculpture of The Farewell by Gwynneth Holt

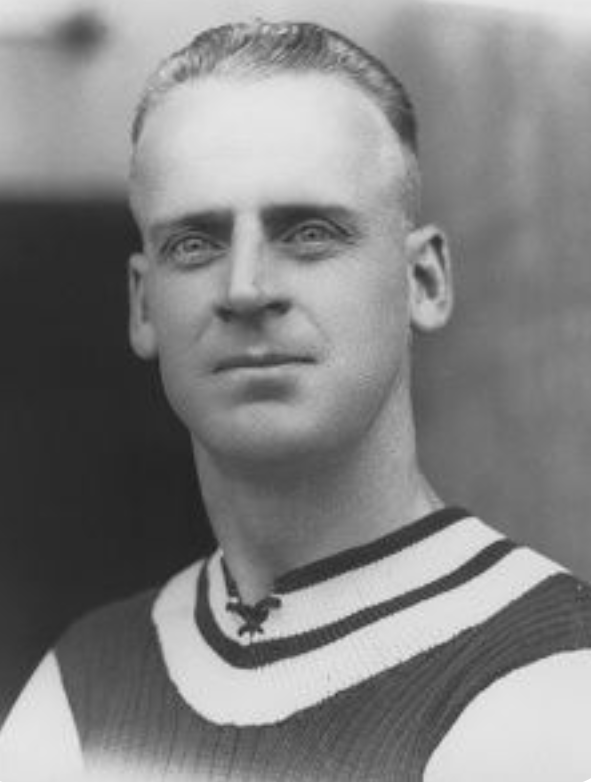
Billy Walker, 1925

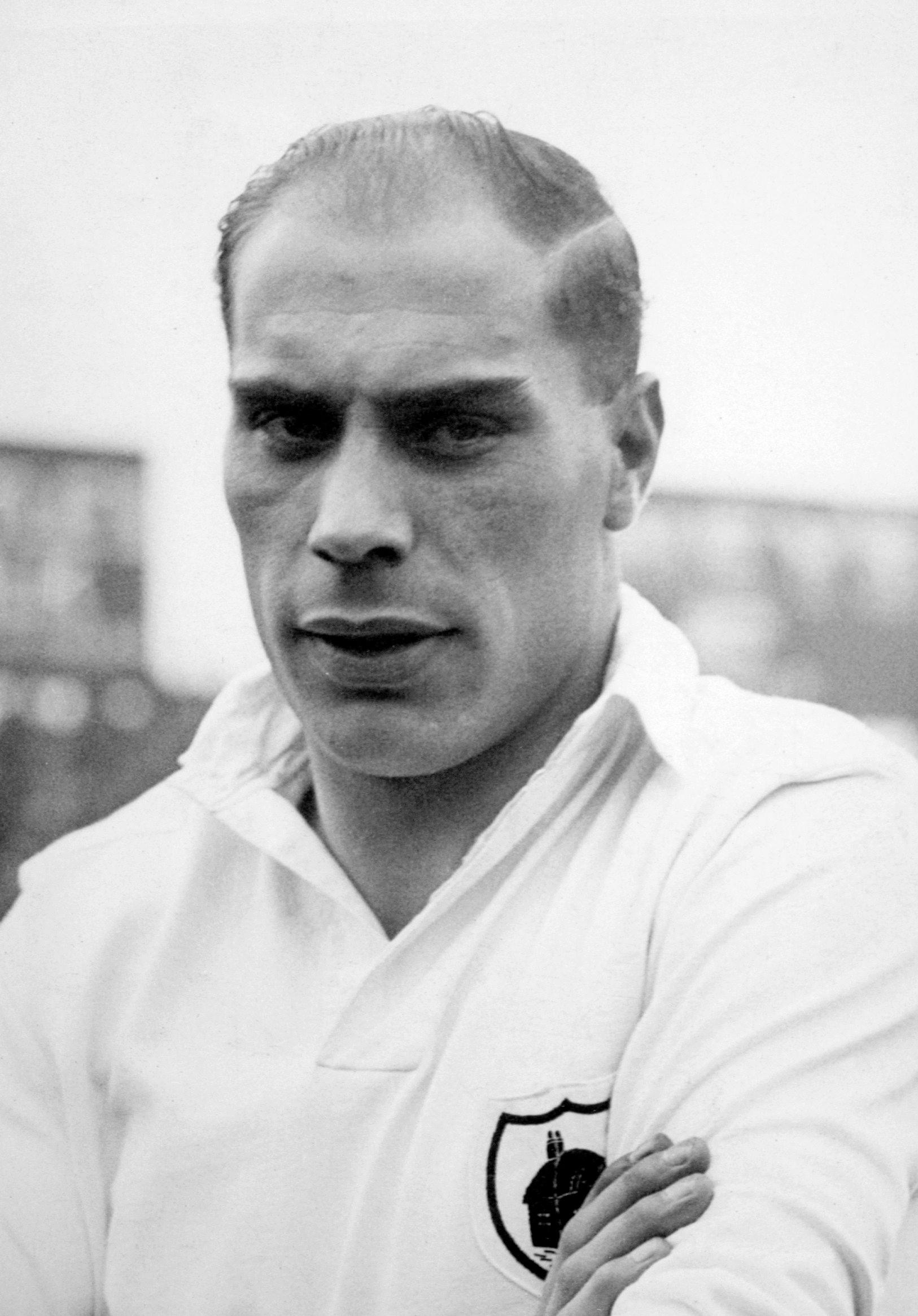
Syd Gibbons

- William Paget KG PC (1506–1563), statesman and accountant.
- Moses Haughton the elder (ca.1734 – 1804), engraver, designer and painter.
- Richard Whatcoat (1736–1806), the third bishop of the American Methodist Episcopal Church.
- Moses Haughton the younger (1773–1849), engraver and painter, often of miniatures.
- John Brotherton (1829–1917), tube manufacturer and Mayor of Wolverhampton 1883/84.
- John Ashley Kilvert (1833–1920), soldier in the Charge of the Light Brigade, later Mayor of Wednesbury
- Wilson Lloyd (1835–1908), iron founder and twice MP for Wednesbury
- The Garman Sisters (ca.1900-ca.1975), members of the Bloomsbury Group, lived at Oakeswell Hall
- Gwynneth Holt (1909–1995), artist known for her ivory sculptures on religious subjects.
- Kathleen Margaret Midwinter (1909–1995), the first female Clerk of the House of Commons.
- Henry Treece (1911–1966), poet and writer, mostly of children's historical novels.
- Richard Wattis (1912–1975), character actor
- Kevin Laffan (1922–2003), screenwriter, author and actor; created the soap opera now titled Emmerdale.
- Peter Archer, Baron Archer of Sandwell QC, PC (1926–2012), lawyer and MP for Rowley Regis and Tipton from 1966 until 1992
- Jon Brookes (ca.1945–2013), drummer for The Charlatans
- Alex Lester (born 11 May 1956), BBC Radio 2 overnight broadcaster
- David Howarth (born 1958), politician and MP for Cambridge, 2005 to 2010.
- Karl Shuker (born 1959), zoologist, cryptozoologist and author.
- Lee Payne (born 1960), the founding bassist and songwriter of heavy metal, power metal band Cloven Hoof.
- Baga Chipz (born 1989), drag queen and TV personality

=== Sport ===
- Billy Malpass (1867–1939), footballer who played 133 games for Wolves
- Marty Hogan (1869–1923), baseball player and manager.
- Fred Shinton (1883–1923), footballer played 163 games, most for The Albion and Leicester City
- Billy Walker (1897–1964), footballer who played for 478 games for Aston Villa and 18 for England and was later manager of Nottingham Forest's FA Cup winning side in 1959
- Syd Gibbons (1907–1953), footballer, played 299 games for Fulham
- Jack Burkitt (1926–2003), footballer who played 463 games for Nottingham Forest
- Roy Proverbs (1932–2017), footballer, played over 350 games, mainly for Gillingham
- Wilf Carter (1933–2013), footballer who played over 350 games, mainly for Plymouth Argyle
- Norman Deeley (1933–2007), footballer, played 279 games including 206 for Wolves
- Gordon Wills (1934–2018), footballer who played 300 games mainly for Notts County and Leicester City
- Johnny Gill (born 1941), footballer who played 343 games, mainly for Hartlepool United
- Alan Hinton (born 1942), footballer, played over 500 games, including 253 for Derby County
- Roy Cross (born 1947), footballer, played 298 games, including 136 for Port Vale
- Brian Caswell (born 1956), footballer who played 425 games including 400 for Walsall
- John Thomas (born 1958), footballer who played 365 games
- Aaron Williams (born 1993), footballer who played over 360 games

== Notable employers ==
=== Current ===
- Property developers J.J. Gallagher had purchased the bulk of the Lloyd site in 1988 and once mineshafts were filled in, decontamination was completed the land was suitable for mass retail development. IKEA purchased the former F.H. Lloyd steel plant from Triplex in 1988, and opened one of its first British stores on the site in January 1991, just 14 months after the development had been given the go-ahead.
- Morrisons opened a supermarket in the town centre on 4 November 2007, creating some 350 new jobs. A number of council bungalows and a section of the town centre shops had been demolished to make way for it.
- Quantum print and packaging Limited employs 30 people since relocating to Wednesbury in 2013 from their Willenhall base. The factory occupies a 30000 sq ft site in the town centre.
- In 2016, successful German supermarket chain Lidl opened a new distribution centre just off Wood Green Road, on land near Junction 9 Retail Park.
- MSC Industrial Supply a leading distributor of metalworking and maintenance, repair, and operations (MRO) products and services

=== Former ===
- Patent Shaft (part of the Cammel Laird group) steelworks was erected on land off Leabrook Road near the border with Tipton in 1840, serving the town for 140 years before its closure on 17 April 1980 – an early casualty of the recession. Demolition of the site took place in 1983.
- Metro Cammell (Metropolitan Company) set up business after acquiring all of the assets of the Patent Shaft in 1902, in 1919 Vickers ltd acquired the shares of The Metropolitan Company ltd, in 1929 Vickers ltd and Cammel laird and Co merged their interests to form The Metropolitan Cammel Carriage and Wagon works Co ltd, where it produced railway coach bodies, turntables, Bridges, railway wagons and pressings at the Old Park works. The plant remained opened until 1964. The work and its workers were transferred to the Washwood heath works Birmingham. The site was sold to The Rubery Owen group.
- F.H. Lloyd steelworks was formed at a site on Park Lane near the boundaries with Walsall and Darlaston during the 1880s, and provided employment for some 100 years. However, F.H. Lloyd was hit hard by the economic problems of the 1970s and early 1980s, and went out of business in 1982. Triplex Iron Foundry of Tipton then took the site over, but the new owners kept the factory open for just six years and it was then sold to Swedish home products company IKEA in 1988, being demolished almost immediately to make way for the superstore, which opened in January 1991.
- A Cargo Club supermarket-style retail warehouse, part of the Nurdin and Peacock group, opened in July 1994. It was one of three Cargo Club stores in Britain, and the venture was not a success: by the end of 1995 it had been shut down following heavy losses.

== Cock-fighting ballad ==
A ballad about cock-fighting in the town called "Wedgebury Cocking" or "Wednesbury Cocking" became well known in the 19th century. It begins:

At Wednesbury there was a cocking,

A match between Newton and Skrogging;

The colliers and nailers left work,

And all to Spittles' went jogging

To see this noble sport.

Many noted men there resorted,

And though they'd but little money,

Yet that they freely sported.
