= William Highfield Jones =

Alderman William Highfield Jones
- Born: William Highfield Jones; 7 January 1829; Wolverhampton, Staffordshire, England
- Died: 25 March 1903 (aged 74); Wolverhampton, Staffordshire, England
- Occupation: Industrialist
- Known for: Mayor of Wolverhampton, author, benefactor
- Relatives: John Jones (brother); Joseph Jones (brother)

William Highfield Jones JP (7 January 1829 – 25 March 1903) was a successful industrialist, local politician, author and benefactor who, with two of his brothers, built one of the largest businesses in Wolverhampton, Jones Brothers & Co. He became an alderman and the twenty-fifth mayor of Wolverhampton. The Jones brothers are the only family to have provided three mayors of Wolverhampton.

== Early years ==
Jones was born in Wolverhampton on 7 January 1829, one of nine children of Edward Jones and Rebecca. Jones' father was a foreman at the Old Hall japanning works, where three of his sons became apprenticed. William left and set up his own business in rented workshops nearby.

== Jones Bros. & Co. ==
In due course Jones was joined by his two brothers, Harry and Benjamin, and they bought an empty japanning works and set up the company of Jones Bros. & Co. in 1853. As the business grew they expanded into adjoining properties. Benjamin's son's joined the company and travelled extensively representing the company in South Africa, India and China. In 1886 Jones is named as a co-inventor of "a new method of ornamenting metal articles by electro deposit process on the articles and filling in the ornaments with japan, varnish, paint or enamel". Jones retired in 1896.

== Politics ==
Jones was elected to the town council in 1863 and was chairman of several influential committees, including both the Streets and Lighting Committees. He served as Mayor of Wolverhampton in 1873/74.

== Education in Wolverhampton ==
Elected as a member of the Wolverhampton School Board, Jones was a fervent advocate of education for all, a key objective of the Government's Education Act 1870. The William Highfield Jones Memorial Schools were a substantial legacy of his efforts. In his will dated 5 March 1901, Jones left £1,000 to the Tettenhall College investment trustees, and a similar sum to the Wolverhampton & Staffordshire Hospital.

== Congregational Church ==
Jones was a noted non-conformist, and amongst other books wrote a history of the Congregational churches in Wolverhampton.

== Awards and honours ==
Jones was given the Freedom of the Borough of Wolverhampton in July 1902, on the occasion of the visit by the Lord Mayor of London.

== Family ==
Jones' brothers John and Joseph were similarly successful. They started the Corrugated Iron Company in 1857 and both went on to become aldermen and Mayor of Wolverhampton.

== Bibliography ==
- History of the Congregational churches of Wolverhampton, from the year 1662 to 1894, William Highfield Jones, Alexander & Shepheard, 1894
- Story of the Japan: Tin-plate Working and Iron Braziers' Trades, Bicycle and Galvanising Trades, and Enamel Ware Manufacture in Wolverhampton and District, William Highfield Jones, Alexander & Shepheard, 1900
- Story of the Municipal Life of Wolverhampton, William Highfield Jones, Alexander & Shepheard, Wolverhampton, 1903

Political offices
Preceded by Isaac Jenks	Mayor of Wolverhampton; 1873–1874	Succeeded by William Edwards
