= Sandwell Community History and Archives Service =

Sandwell Archives Service
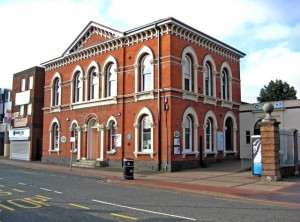
- Smethwick Library is also the home of Sandwell Community History and Archives Service
- 52.496457°N 1.972454°W
- Location: Smethwick Library, High Street, Smethwick, West Midlands, B66 1AA
- Type: Public Archive
- Established: 1992

Other information
- Website: www.sandwell.gov.uk/archives

Sandwell Community History and Archives Service (CHAS) is the archive service for the Metropolitan Borough of Sandwell in the West Midlands of England. The service is based within Smethwick Library. It collects and preserves original archives and published material relating to the history of Sandwell. It is a local authority archive service, run and funded by Sandwell Metropolitan Borough Council.

== History ==
Until the early 1990s each of the towns that make up Sandwell kept their own archive and local studies collections; the service was restructured to create community libraries (rather than branch libraries) in 1992.

== Collections ==
Sandwell Archives holds archive collections created by organisations, families and businesses based in Sandwell. The service is a Diocesan record office, holding Church of England parish records for the Deanery of Warley and All Saints' Church, West Bromwich, as well as numerous non-conformist churches within Sandwell.

As a Place of Deposit for Public Records Sandwell Archives also holds records of local courts, coroners and hospitals. The service also holds the historical records of the former boroughs of Oldbury, Rowley Regis, Smethwick, Tipton, Warley, Wednesbury and West Bromwich.

Significant business collections held by the service include; Chance Brothers, Accles & Pollock, Patent Shaft and T. W. Camm.
