= Frederic Edward Manby =

Frederic Edward Manby, FRCS LRA JP
- Born: Frederic Edward Manby; 19 January 1845; East Rudham, Norfolk, England
- Died: 1 July 1891 (aged 46); Wolverhampton, Staffordshire, England
- Occupation: Surgeon
- Known for: Mayor of Wolverhampton

General surgeon Frederic Edward Manby, FRCS LRA JP (19 January 1845 – 1 July 1891), served as Mayor of Wolverhampton, 1888/89.

== Medical ==
Manby studied at Guy's Hospital before moving to practise in Wolverhampton, where he entered a partnership at 10 King Street before opening his own surgery at 11 King Street. He was appointed Surgeon to the Wolverhampton and Staffordshire General Hospital.

== Borough council ==
He was elected to the town council and worked on schemes for helping the poor. These included improvements in sanitation, implementation of the Artisans' and Labourers' Dwellings Improvement Act 1875 and the building of the Borough Isolation Hospital in 1884. He served as Mayor of Wolverhampton in 1888/89.

== Other appointments ==
- Brigade Surgeon, Staffordshire Infantry Volunteer Brigade
- Surgeon Major, South Staffordshire Regiment and Army Medical Reserve
- Medical Officer of Health of the Cannock Rural District

== Family ==
Manby was born into a family of physicians in East Rudham, Norfolk c. 19 January 1845, where both his father, Frederic Manby, and his grandfather had practised. Along with two of his younger brothers, he attended Epsom College, founded in 1853 to provide a "liberal education" to 100 sons of "duly qualified medical men" for £25 each year. His younger brother, Alan Reeve Manby, was Surgeon-Apothecary in Ordinary to the Prince of Wales at Sandringham and later Physician Extraordinary. The youngest of the family, Edward Petronell Manby, rose to become a highly regarded Medical Officer at the Ministry of Health with an unparalleled knowledge of Poor Law medicine.

Frederick Manby died in Guernsey on 1 July 1891 while convalescing from influenza.

== Honours and awards ==
For his works with the St John Ambulance Association he was made Hon Associate of the Grand Priory.

Political offices
Preceded by Joseph Jones	Mayor of Wolverhampton; 1888–1889	Succeeded by John Marston
