= Isaac Jenks =

Mayor of Wolverhampton and ironmaster (1816–1888)

- Born: 17 March 1816; Sedgley, England
- Died: 29 January 1888 (aged 59); Rhyl, Wales
- Occupation: Ironmaster
- Known for: Mayor of Wolverhampton, benefactor

External image
- Isaac Jenks in his mayoral robes Wolverhampton History & Heritage website

Isaac Jenks (17 March 1816 – 29 January 1888) was an English industrialist and ironmaster, who served as Mayor of Wolverhampton in 1872–1873. he became a prominent Wesleyan Methodist benefactor.

== Iron and steel ==
Jenks started work at 12 years of age as an apprentice in a local ironworks founded four years earlier by the first Mayor of Wolverhampton, George Thorneycroft. After qualifying, he spent 20 years working in the local iron and steel industry and learned the value of a higher-end product. In 1857, he founded the Minerva Iron and Steel Works, followed closely by the Beaver Works.

Eventually, capacity grew. In some ten years the two sites were supplying some 80 per cent of US steel imports from the UK. They were well placed on the Birmingham Canal Navigations for access to world markets. Brands such as "Jenks" steel and "Beaver" iron appeared on advertising for wholesale iron and steel and finished products, with evidence of agents in London and New York.

Little is known of the firm after 1902. By 1908 the works had been demolished in favour of coal wharves.

== Personal life ==
Jenks was born in Sedgley, Staffordshire in 1816. He was a Wesleyan Methodist and a generous benefactor, who supported good causes and projects, particularly to do with his church and with technical education. He married Rebecca Jones from Dawley, Shropshire in 1839. As he grew more wealthy he moved his family to new homes, finally living at Morley House, Dunstall Hill, north of the town, now a housing estate. He served as Mayor of Wolverhampton in 1872–1873 and donated the gold chain and badge of office still in use today. He died in Rhyl, Flintshire, Wales on 29 January 1888.

Political offices
Preceded by Joseph Ford	Mayor of Wolverhampton; 1872–1873	Succeeded by William Highfield Jones
