= John Jones (ironmaster) =

English industrialist and politician (1835–1897)

- Born: 22 February 1835; Wolverhampton, Staffordshire, England
- Died: 18 July 1897 (aged 62); Wolverhampton, Staffordshire, England
- Occupation: Ironmaster
- Known for: Mayor of Wolverhampton, author
- Relatives: Joseph Jones (brother); William Highfield Jones (brother)

John Jones (22 February 1835 – 18 July 1897) and his brothers William Highfield Jones and Joseph Jones, were successful industrialists, benefactors and politicians. They all became aldermen and served as Mayor of Wolverhampton.

== Iron ==
Jones, and his brother Joseph, founded the Corrugated Iron Company in 1857, specialising in flat or corrugated sheeting.

== Borough council ==
Ironmaster Alderman John Jones served as Mayor of Wolverhampton, for three consecutive terms, 1878—79, 1879—80 and 1880—81, the second longest consecutive period to date.

A former Mayor of Wolverhampton, William Highfield Jones, wrote in his book Story of the Municipal Life of Wolverhampton of the collapse of the market in iron during the term of office of Alderman John Jones in the late 1870s:

While Mr. Jones was Mayor, a season of bad trade set in, which caused distress among the labouring classes. The depression was specially felt in the iron making industry of the district, and brought on a crisis. Firms hitherto of good repute failed to meet their engagements, among these the Chillington Iron Works, the Parkfield Colliery Company, and several others.

The largest and most important firm in the town was G. B. Thorneycroft & Company. The partners in this firm, finding they could not continue making iron except at a great loss, determined to close their works. This was a great blow to the iron workers. Besides this, many of the blast furnaces around were blown out, and the ironworks in the district were silent. Hundreds of decent men wandered about unable to find work.

In addition to these troubles, on January 12th a heavy fall of snow came down, followed by a severe frost, which continued until the end of March. The frost put an entire stop to building operations and all kinds of outdoor employment. The effect was soon felt, and in a short time thousands of families were on the point of starvation. Every day crowds of hungry labouring men could be seen blocking up the thoroughfares opposite the Town Hall, North Street, and the Union Workhouse on the Bilston Road, all clamouring for work or bread.

The Mayor showed great energy in dealing with the emergency. He opened a relief fund, and appealed to the public for subscriptions. His appeal was generously responded to, and he instantly organised centres for the distribution of bread, oatmeal, coals, etc. In addition soup kitchens were opened in different parts of the borough to help the women and children. The members of the town council organised themselves into ward committees and distributed tickets for relief in a systematic manner. The Guardians of the Poor did their utmost to mitigate the suffering.

The company referred to, G. B. Thorneycroft & Company, had been founded by the first Mayor of Wolverhampton, George Benjamin Thorneycroft, in 1824.

== Family ==
Jones was born in Wolverhampton 22 February 1835, the son of jappaner Edward Jones and his wife Rebecca, née Highfield. He married Elizabeth née Leigh and they had nine children. After his marriage he lived on Goldthorn Hill, Wolverhampton. His brother and his family lived close by. His wife died in 1874 and he remarried to Amelia née Sing. They had a further three children. Jones died 18 July 1897 in Wolverhampton.

== Bibliography ==
- John Jones, The Mayors of Wolverhampton, E.J. Rowland (& Whitehead), Wolverhampton, 1880
- John Jones, The Mayors of Wolverhampton, Volume 2, Whitehead Bros., Wolverhampton, 1893

Political offices
Preceded by David Kendrick	Mayor of Wolverhampton; 1878–1881	Succeeded by Herbert C Owen
