= Joseph Crowther Smith =

- Born: 26 September 1818; Rushall, Staffordshire, England
- Died: 26 December 1886 (aged 68); Wolverhampton, Staffordshire, England
- Occupation: Solicitor
- Known for: Mayor of Wolverhampton,

Solicitor Joseph Crowther Smith (26 September 1818 – 26 December 1886) served as Mayor of Wolverhampton 1865/66

== Early life ==
Joseph Crowther Smith was born on 26 September 1818 in Rushall, Staffordshire, the son of wealthy miller, Joseph Smith of Rushall Mills, and Ann née Crowther, of Mavesyn Ridware, Staffordshire.

== Legal career ==
Smith became an articled clerk and attorney-at-law to Walsall solicitor, Samuel Smith, on 24 March 1835. He qualified on 12 June 1840, and by 1841 he was a practising solicitor at 19 Cock Street, Wolverhampton, Staffordshire (now Victoria St).

== Politics ==
Smith became Mayor of Wolverhampton in 1865. His term was difficult due to an outbreak of cattle plague.

=== Cattle plague ===
An epizootic of cattle plague had affected large parts of the country from 1865 to 1866. Smith was responsible for ensuring that an effective borough plan to counter the spread of the disease was in place. This involved the closure of the municipal cattle market & abattoir, and private cattle markets, safe disposal of carcases, along with restrictions on the sale and movement of cattle. The measures resolved the situation and the disease finally disappeared in 1866.

=== Lifeboat 'Wolverhampton' ===
Smith was one of the dignitaries present at the launch of the first lifeboat named 'Wolverhampton' on 27 August 1866 at Showell Pool, Bushbury. The money to build the boat had been raised in the three years since the formation of the Wolverhampton branch of the Royal National Lifeboat Institution (RNLI). Smith's wife performed the naming ceremony. The lifeboat saw service in South Wales, stationed at The Mumbles, Swansea.

== Personal life ==
=== Manor of Goscote ===
In 1819 Joseph Smith of Rushall Mills bought the Goscote estate from a trustee for Dr Samuel Hughes. Smith left the estate in his will to his son, Joseph Crowther Smith, who in turn left it to trustees for his niece, Harriet Cooke.

=== Family ===
He married Matilda Bill Smith in 1855 in Wolverhampton, Staffordshire. Matilda was the daughter of William Smith and Harriet Bill of Brewood, Staffordshire. He died in 1886 at Newbridge House, Wolverhampton, Staffordshire. Both Smith and his wife are buried at Brewood.

Political offices
Preceded by John Ford	Mayor of Wolverhampton; 1865–1866	Succeeded by John Morris
