= Joseph Jones (ironmaster) =

Mayor of Wolverhampton (1837–1912)

Alderman Joseph Jones
- Born: Joseph Jones; 7 March 1837; Wolverhampton, Staffordshire, England
- Died: 12 September 1912 (aged 75); Wolverhampton, Staffordshire, England
- Occupation: Ironmaster
- Known for: Mayor of Wolverhampton
- Relatives: John Jones (brother); William Highfield Jones (brother)

Joseph Jones (7 Mar 1837 – 12 September 1912), and his brothers William Highfield Jones and John Jones, were successful industrialists, benefactors and politicians. All three became aldermen and served as Mayor of Wolverhampton.

== Iron ==
Jones, and his brother John, founded the Corrugated Iron Company in 1857, specialising in flat or corrugated sheeting.

== Borough council ==
Ironmaster Alderman Joseph Jones served as Mayor of Wolverhampton 1887/88.

== Family ==
Jones was born in Wolverhampton on 7 Mar 1837, the son of jappaner Edward Jones and his wife Rebecca, née Highfield. Jones married Elizabeth 'Betsey' Pinson on 15 July 1865, and they had five children. After his marriage he lived on Goldthorn Hill, Wolverhampton. His brother John and his family lived close by. Jones died 12 September 1912 in Wolverhampton.

Political offices
Preceded by Thomas Vincent Jackson	Mayor of Wolverhampton; 1887–1888	Succeeded by Frederic Edward Manby
