= James Shipton =

English timber merchant (1798–1865)

- Born: James Shipton; 19 August 1798; Birmingham, Warwickshire, England
- Died: 1 February 1865 (aged 66); Leamington Priors, Warwickshire, England
- Occupations: Timber merchant and licensed carrier
- Known for: Mayor of Wolverhampton

James Shipton (19 August 1798 – 1 February 1865) was a timber merchant and licensed carrier who served as mayor of Wolverhampton from 1854 to 1855.

== Shipton and Co. ==
Following established coal and flour milling operations alongside Brindley's newly constructed Birmingham Canal at Albion Wharf, Wolverhampton, James and Maurice Shipton opened a carrier service in 1821, followed by a timber wharf in 1827.

The Shipton family were established timber merchants with a yard in Birmingham started by Joseph Shipton. Shiptons developed a new Albion Wharf depot for the Swift Packet boat service between Birmingham and Wolverhampton to replace their earlier site. Maurice Shipton dissolved the partnership and James continued to trade on his own. The area continued to develop as a junction between canal and the railways. In 1833 Shipton & Co built a warehouse at Gloucester Docks. The list of daily destinations served by Shipton's fly boats gives an idea of the scale of the operation:

Liverpool, Manchester, Preston Brook, Chester, Wrexham, North Wales, Shardlow, Gainsborough, Derby, Hull, the Staffordshire iron works, Bilston, Dudley, Worcester, Gloucester, Bristol, Tewkesbury, London, Birmingham, Stourport, and Kidderminster.

Shipton's operation as a carrier of anything, but specialising in finished iron products, grew through several acquisitions until it was taken over by the North Staffordshire Railway in 1847. However the business suffered and was sold on to the Bridgewater Trustees in 1849. James Shipton was retained as their agent.

== Politics ==
James became Mayor of Wolverhampton in November 1854. His term was difficult due to a dispute concerning the Wolverhampton Waterworks Company. The council had come under criticism from many quarters for failing to agree purchase, with many meetings held with no progress. For this reason he declined to stand for another term. This dispute led to the tenure of the next mayor, Edward Perry, being extended to two terms to resolve the situation.

== Family ==
Shipton was born in Birmingham on 19 August 1798, the son of Joseph Shipton and Caroline. Shipton married Anne Adcock of Penkridge, Staffordshire on 27 July 1824 and the family lived at Dunstall Hill, Wolverhampton, north of the town.

When his term in office as Mayor was over in 1855, he went into semi-retirement. He finally retired in 1858 and left the town to settle in Leamington Priors, Warwickshire, now known as Leamington Spa. He died on 1 February 1865 in Leamington.

Political offices
Preceded by John Neve	Mayor of Wolverhampton; 1854–1855	Succeeded by Edward Perry
