= Edward Petronell Manby =

Edward Petronell Manby MRCS, MD, DPH Camb.
- Born: 19 August 1864; East Rudham, Norfolk
- Died: 20 September 1929 (aged 65)
- Resting place: Highgate Cemetery

Edward Petronell Manby (1864-1929) was highly regarded medical officer at the Ministry of Health with an unparalleled knowledge of Poor Law medicine.

== Early life ==
Edward Manby was born on 19 August 1864, the youngest son of Frederick Manby MD and his wife Catherine Reeve. Manby was born into a family of physicians in East Rudham, Norfolk, where both his father and his grandfather had practised. Along with two of his elder brothers, he attended Epsom College, founded in 1853 to provide a "liberal education" to 100 sons of "duly qualified medical men" for £25 each year. His elder brother, Alan Reeve Manby, was Surgeon-Apothecary In Ordinary to the Prince of Wales at Sandringham and later Physician Extraordinary. His eldest sibling, Frederic Edward Manby was appointed Surgeon to the Wolverhampton and Staffordshire General Hospital and served as Mayor of Wolverhampton, 1888/89.

== Career ==
After leaving Epsom College in 1881, he received his medical education at Christ's College, Cambridge and Guy's Hospital, achieving MRCS in 1886, MD in 1891 and a Department of Health & Primary Care (DPH) PhD from Cambridge in 1894. In the early 1890s he was working as a doctor in Liverpool, living at 1 Upper Parliament Street and by 1897 he was the Assistant Port Sanitary Medical Officer, the first of several local and central government advisory appointments. He returned to London at the turn of the century, and by 1901 was living at 121 Victoria Street. He was appointed as medical officer of the Fountain Fever Hospital in Tooting, of the Metropolitan Asylums Board, examiner in Public Health for London, Liverpool and Leeds Universities, and also enjoyed membership of the British Medical Association and the Honourable Society of the Middle Temple. His final appointment was as a medical officer at the Ministry of Health, where he became an expert in metropolitan hospitals catering for the poor. A colleague, Dr. F. N. Kay Menzies, gave this eulogy, "Manby knew more about Poor Law medical work than almost any other medical man in existence, and therefore the fact that he has been lost to the service is nothing less than a national misfortune, more especially in view of the coming into operation on April 1st next of the Local Government Act, 1929".

== Family life and death ==
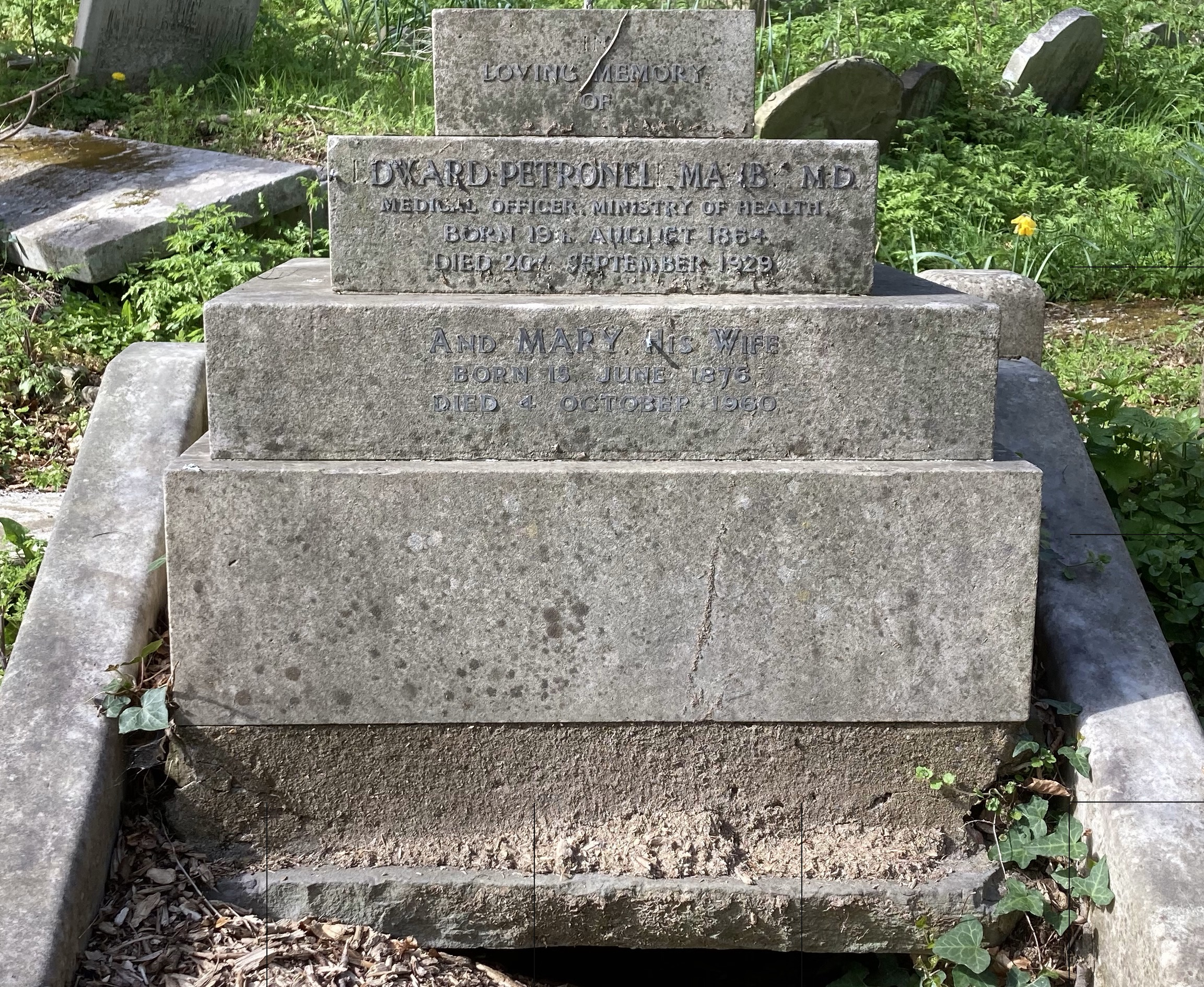
Grave of Edward Petronell Manby in Highgate Cemetery

Manby married when he was 47, in 1912, to Mary Bruce and they had one son, John Edward (Jack) (1914-1993).

Edward Petronell Manby died on 20 September 1929, and is buried with Mary, who died in 1960, on the west side of Highgate Cemetery.
