= John Brotherton (industrialist) =

British politician, Manufacturer (1819-1917)

- Born: 20 September 1829; Wednesbury, Staffordshire, England
- Died: 1917 (aged 88); Wolverhampton, Staffordshire, England
- Occupation: Industrialist
- Known for: Mayor of Wolverhampton

John Brotherton (20 September 1829 – 1917) was a tube manufacturer who served as Mayor of Wolverhampton 1883/84.

== Early years ==
Brotherton was born in 1829, a son of Richard Brotherton and Mary. He was raised in a large family by his widowed mother and was apprenticed to his uncle, Cornelius Whitehouse, an innovator in new ways of tube manufacture. He worked in Wednesbury and Monmore Green and acquired the knowledge to leave and set up his own business aged 32.

== Imperial Tube Works ==
John Brotherton Ltd. was founded in Wolverhampton in 1861. Advertising of the time shows that they produced a range of tubes and fittings for hot water, boilers, water or oil wells, railway signalling and points rods, refrigeration, ovens and valves. The company expanded rapidly acquiring additional premises along the canal and adjacent to the new railway. It grew to become one of the largest tube manufacturers in South Staffordship, with a worldwide reputation for high quality products.

== Politics ==
Brotherton was elected to Wolverhampton Borough Council in 1873. He represented St George's Ward and was a member of the Waterworks Committee, promoting improvements to the town supply. He served as Mayor of Wolverhampton from 1883/84.

Political offices
Preceded by Francis Davis Gibbons	Mayor of Wolverhampton; 1883–1884	Succeeded by John Annan
