= Bishan Dass =

British Labour Party politician

Councillor Bishan Dass Bains

Lord Mayor of Wolverhampton
- In office May 1986 – May 1987

Member of Wolverhampton City Council for Ettingshall Ward
- In office 1975–2016

Personal details
- Born: Shaffipur, Jalandhar, India
- Party: Labour (2010-present)
- Education: Panjab University

Bishan Dass is a British politician who became the first British Asian Lord Mayor of Wolverhampton in 1986. He was first elected as Councillor of Ettingshall Ward on 1 May 1975.

== Life ==
Bishan Dass was born in Ravidassia family of Village Shaffipur in the North Indian state of Punjab. In 1963, he came to the UK. He was elected for the first time to the Metropolitan Borough Council of Wolverhampton in 1979.

== Opposition to Racism and Caste Discrimination ==
He faced bitter experiences of casteism when Jat men of the left-wing Indian Workers Association (IWA), active in Britain since the 1950s, challenged his candidature in the local council elections in 1979.

== Publications ==
He published a book named Pride Vs Prejudice, in which he penned down his lifelong struggle against inequality, discrimination, and prejudice. There are a number of horrifying and distressing stories about caste-based untouchability still practising in India and racial prejudice in the UK.

== See also ==
- List of mayors of Wolverhampton
