= Wednesbury Town Hall =

Municipal building in Wednesbury, West Midlands, England

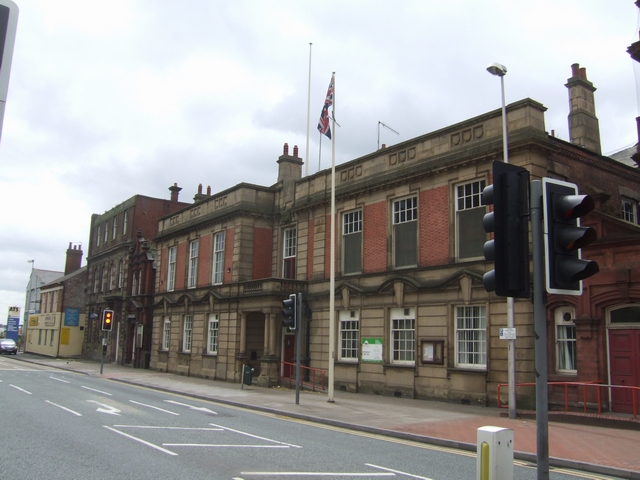
- Wednesbury Town Hall

- Shown in West Midlands
- 52.5503°N 2.0218°W
- Location: Holyhead Road, Wednesbury

History
- Built: 1874

Site notes
- Architect: Loxton Brothers
- Architectural style: Neoclassical style

Wednesbury Town Hall is a municipal building in Holyhead Road in Wednesbury, West Midlands, England. The structure, which was the meeting place of Wednesbury Borough Council, now operates as an events venue.

== History ==
The first municipal building in Wednesbury was a market cross which became the local town hall in 1742: this designation was later transferred to the assembly rooms in Russell Street. In the mid-19th century, the local board of health held their meetings in rented offices in Lower High Street and then in Little Russell Street; after finding this arrangement inadequate, the board decided to procure bespoke municipal offices: the site they selected was agricultural land on the southwest side of Holyhead Road. A design competition was held for which there were twenty five entries: the winning design was submitted by Loxton Brothers of Wednesbury.

The new building was designed in the Italianate style, built in red brick with stone dressings at a cost of £2,700 and was officially opened by the chairman of the board, Richard Williams, on 26 June 1874. The Lord Lieutenant of Staffordshire, Lord Wrottesley, and the Bishop of Lichfield, George Selwyn, were in attendance. The design involved a symmetrical main frontage with three bays facing onto Holyhead Road; the central bay, which slightly projected forward, featured a portico with two pairs of Doric order columns supporting an entablature inscribed with the words "Municipal Offices ". There were round headed sash windows on the first floor and an entablature, a modillioned cornice and a central pediment at roof level. Internally, the principal room was the main hall which was located behind the offices and contained an organ which was a gift from the local member of parliament, Alexander Brogden.

Following significant population growth, largely associated with the ironwork industries, the area became a municipal borough, with the municipal offices as its headquarters in 1886. In this context, civic leaders decided to expand the building: a foundation stone for the extension was laid by the mayor, Alderman Albert Edward Pritchard, on 3 February 1913. The works, which involved extending the building by four bays to the southeast as well as re-fronting the existing section, were designed by Scott & Clark and the works were carried out by the contractors, John Guest & Son. The design of the enlarged structure involved an asymmetrical main frontage with seven bays facing onto Holyhead Road; the central bay which, together with the right hand section, was stepped back again featured a portico with two pairs of Doric order columns supporting an entablature. There was a balcony with a French door on the first floor; the other bays featured sash windows and there was a balustrade at roof level. Internally, the main hall behind the offices was preserved.

Colonel T. E. Hickman M.P. attended the town hall on 22 August 1914 as part of his campaign to recruit potential troops for a new battalion for the South Staffordshire Regiment for service in the First World War: the next day the mayor personally escorted 200 recruits to Whittington Barracks. Queen Elizabeth II visited the town hall and waved to the crowd from the balcony during a visit to the West Midlands on 24 May 1962.

The municipal offices continued to serve as the headquarters of the borough for much of the 20th century but ceased to be local seat of government when the area was absorbed into West Bromwich County Borough in 1966. The building subsequently operated as an events venue for concerts and theatre productions and, from 1974, as the local housing office for Sandwell Metropolitan Borough Council. A major programme of restorations works costing £500,000, which involved new offices for the housing staff and a new box office for events, was completed in April 2014. Subsequent performers at events in the town hall have included the singer-songwriter, Gareth Gates, in June 2014.
