= George Lees Underhill =

- Born: 20 May 1813; Wolverhampton, Staffordshire, England
- Died: 24 January 1881 (aged 67); Wolverhampton, Staffordshire, England
- Occupation: Iron merchant
- Known for: Mayor of Wolverhampton, and Queen's Visit

George Lees Underhil (20 May 1813—24 January 1881) was a successful iron merchant who became thirteenth Mayor of Wolverhampton (1861/62).

== Early life ==
George Lees Underhill was born 20 May 1813 in Wolverhampton, the son of ironmonger Joseph Underhill and Sarah. George and his wife Caroline lived in Dudley Street and had three children, but only their son Joseph survived beyond infancy. Caroline was 29 when she died leaving Underhill a widower with one son, who became a barrister-at-law. Underhill did not remarry.

== Politics ==
Underhill was elected thirteenth Mayor of Wolverhampton from c. 27 November 1861 to 1862.

== Queen's Visit ==
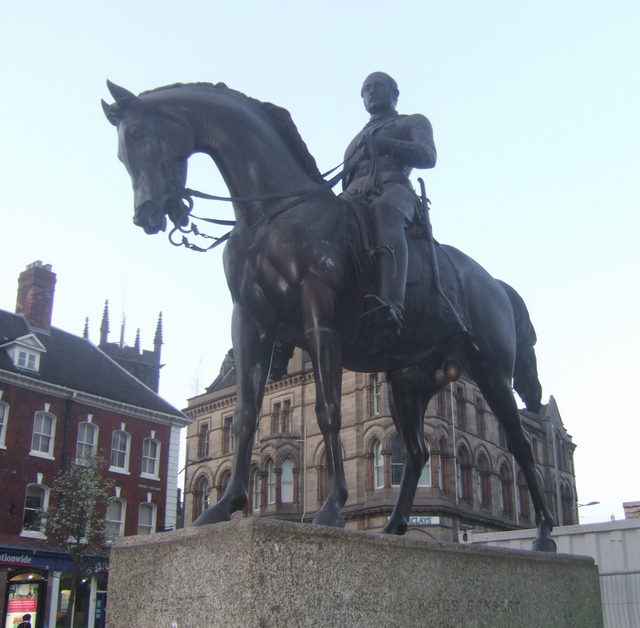
Prince Albert Statue – Queen Square

Following the death of Albert, Prince Consort in 1861, Underhill led a subscription to raise funds to erect a statue in Wolverhampton. The statue by sculptor, Thomas Thornycroft, was completed in 1866. Underhill, along with three other civic dignitaries, travelled to London to petition the Queen to unveil the statue. This was despite the Queen having turned down invitations to public appearances in Liverpool and Manchester. Surprisingly she agreed and visited Wolverhampton nine days later, on 30 November 1866. The Queen was impressed by her reception and borrowing a sword from the Lord Lieutenant, knighted the then Mayor, John Morris, on the spot.

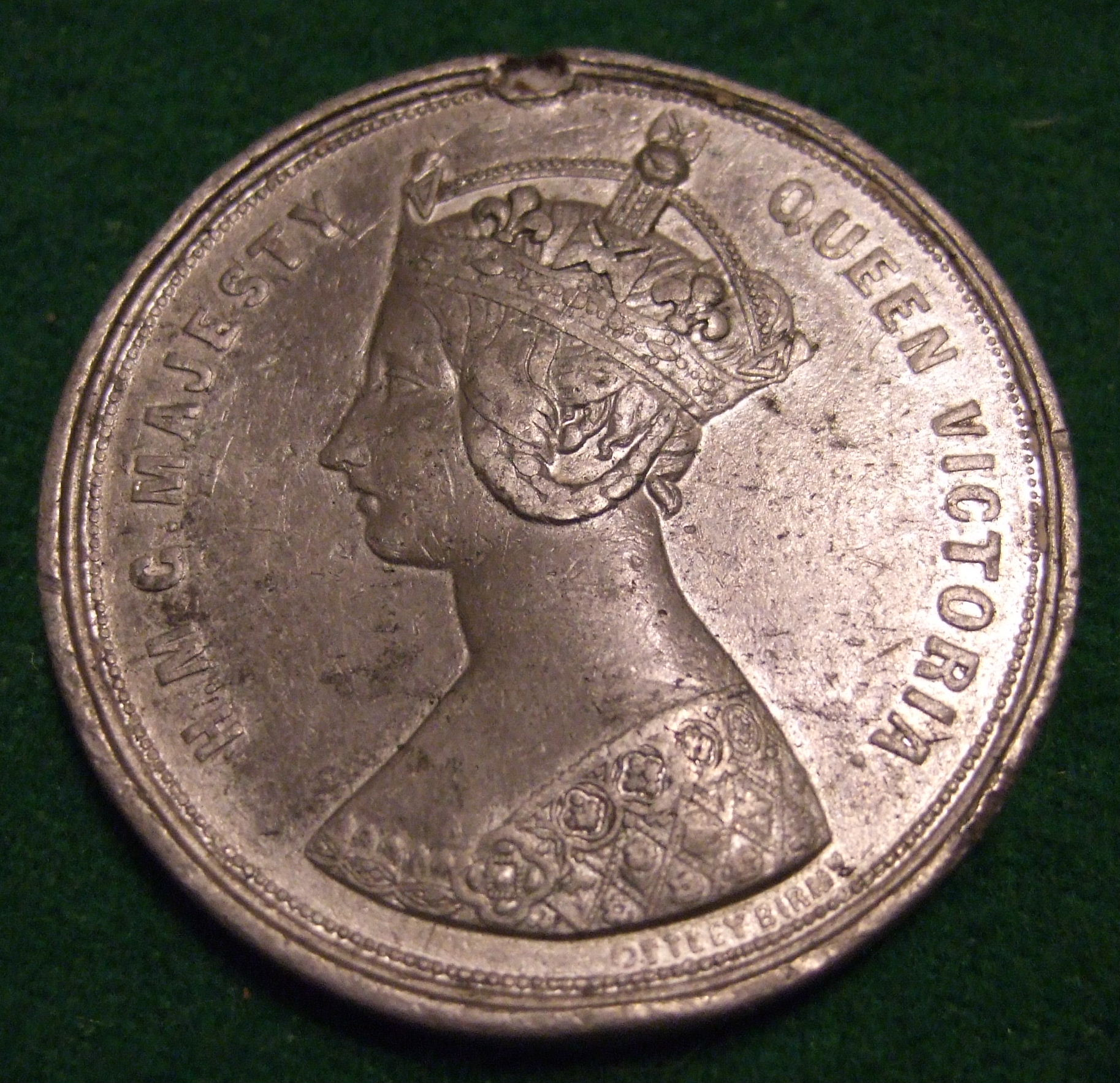
Obverse of 1866 medallion

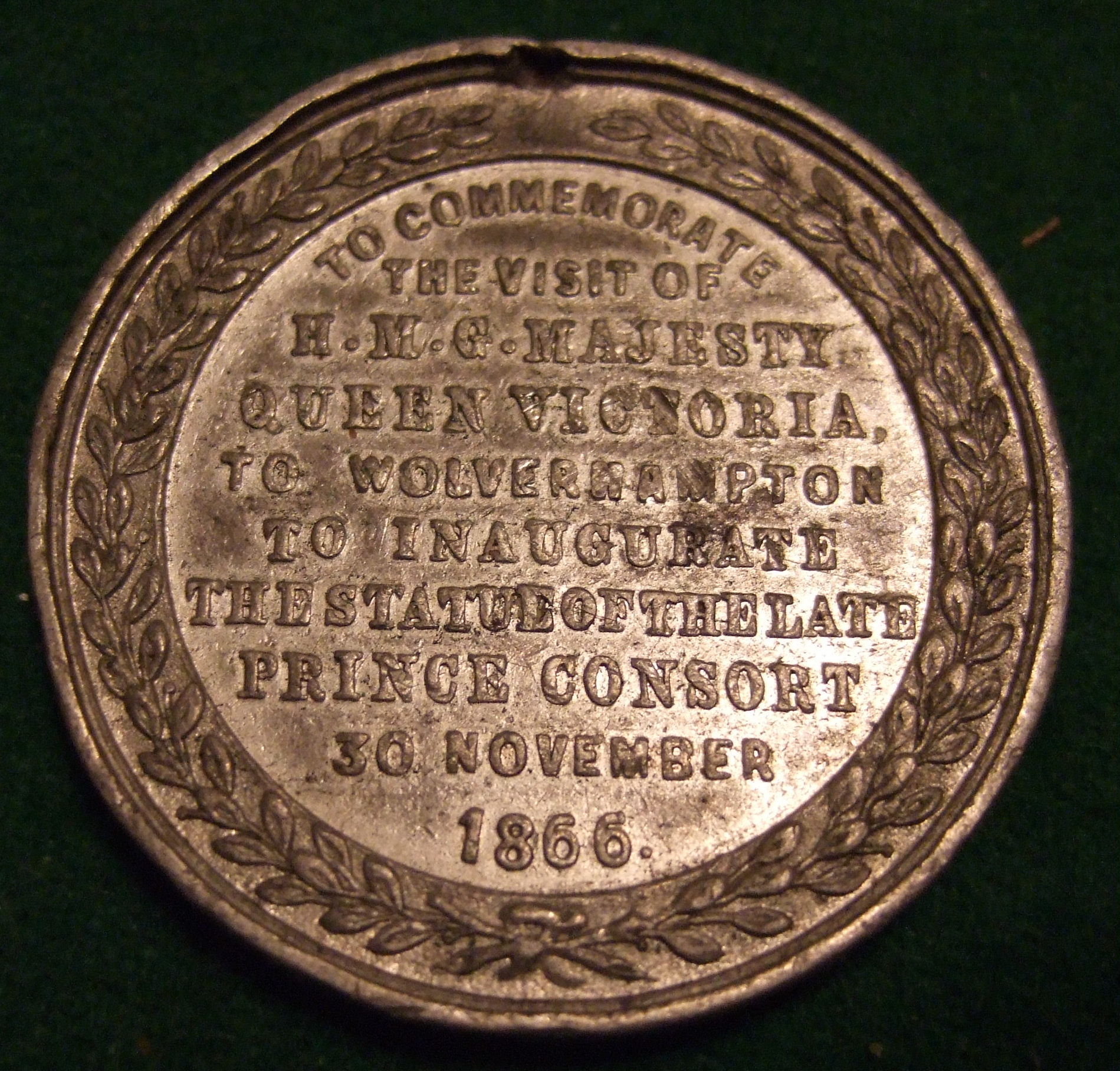
Reverse of 1866 medallion

== Personal life ==
Underhill died in Wolverhampton on 24 January 1881 and was buried on 2 February in Merridale Municipal Cemetery.

Political offices
Preceded by Charles Clarke	Mayor of Wolverhampton; 1861–1862	Succeeded by Henry Hartley Fowler
