= Patent Shaft =

Patent Shaft, formerly The Patent Shaft and Axletree Company, established in 1840, was a steel-making company that operated large steelworks situated in Wednesbury, then in Staffordshire (now West Midlands), England, in a region known as the Black Country due to its industrialisation. It was in operation for 140 years, and employed hundreds of local people.

== History ==
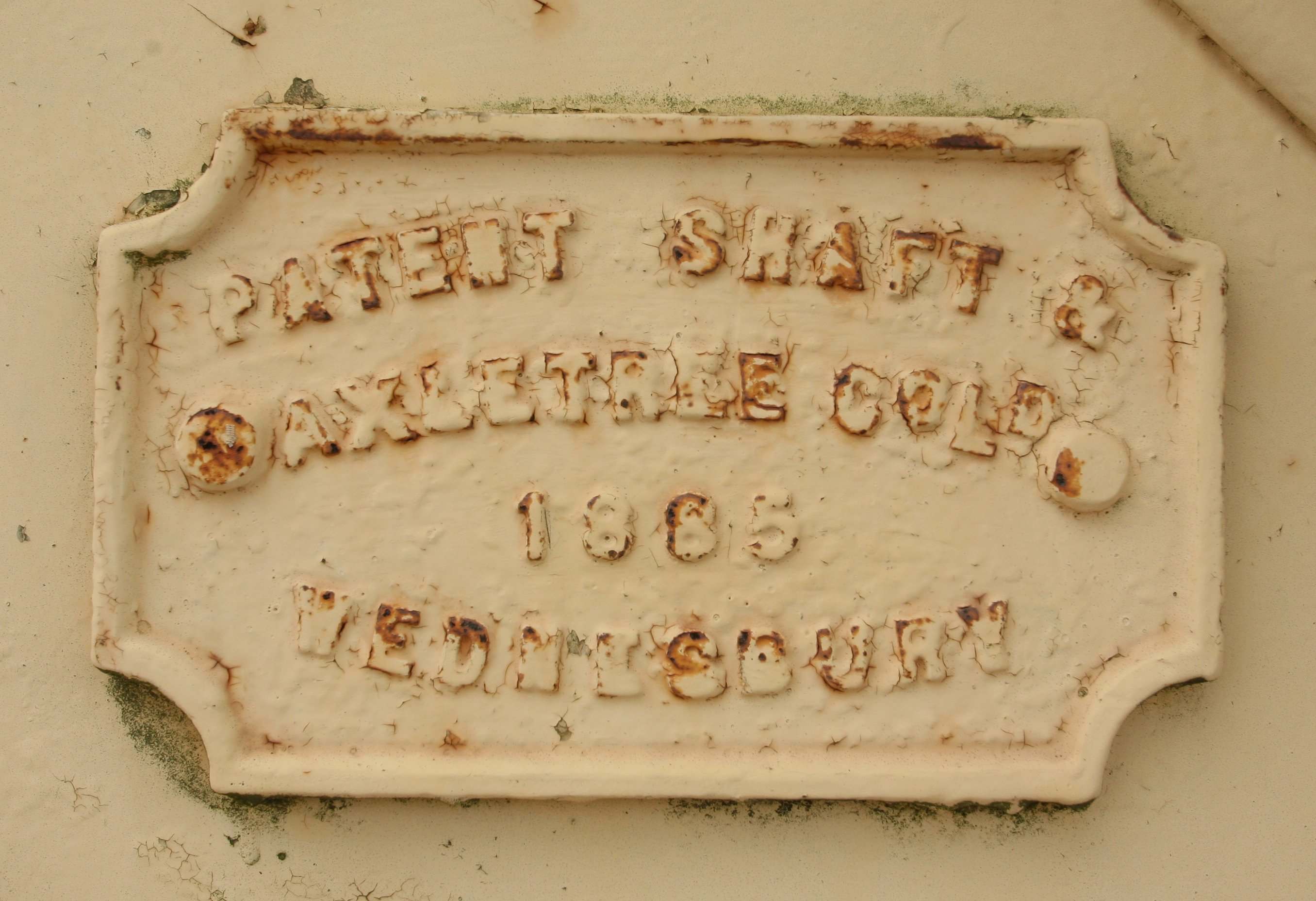
Patent Shaft & Axletree makers' plate, dated 1885, on the Ibigawa Bridge, Gifu prefecture, Japan

The metalwork for Blackfriars Bridge in London was built by The Patent Shaft, following their takeover of Lloyds, Foster and Company.

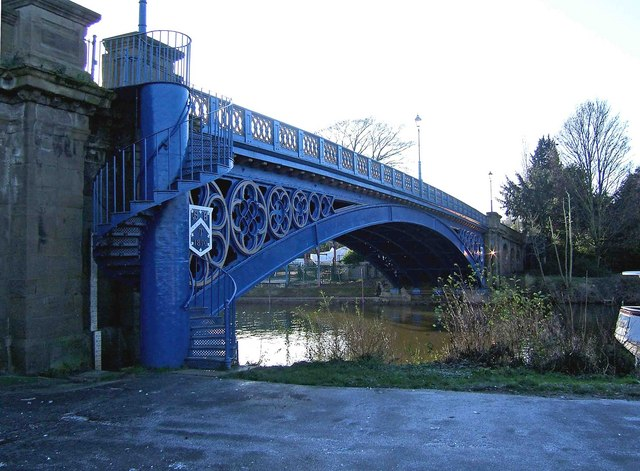
Stourport Bridge

They provided metalwork for the 1870 rebuild of the road bridge over the River Severn at Stourport.

They made the steel girders for the Ibigawa Bridge, Gifu prefecture, Japan; and for Malviya Bridge, then known as Dufferin Bridge, the first metal bridge over the Ganges, opened in 1887.

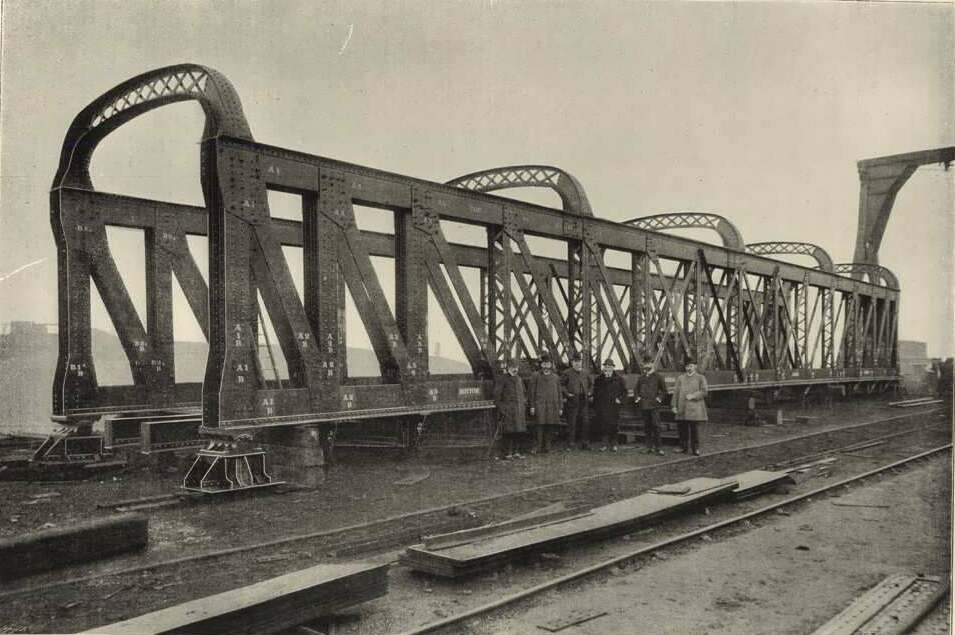
The first of the prefabricated Tugela River spans, seen at the Wednesbury works, from The Engineer, 19 January 1900

In 1900 they built prefabricated sections for two bridges, one of five spans and one of two, over the Tugela River in South Africa, at Colenso and Frere respectively. These replaced earlier bridges, of different design, which they had made in 1877 and which were destroyed by the Boers during the Second Boer War.

A decline in the manufacturing industry during the 1970s meant that even the largest factories were faced with threat of closure. Patent Shaft closed in 1980 after 140 years, resulting in hundreds of job losses. The factory buildings were demolished in 1983.

== Legacy ==
In the decade following its closure, the Patent Shaft site was substantially transformed. The construction of the Black Country Spine Road between Bilston and West Bromwich opened up several square miles of previously inaccessible land in 1995. The Spine Road actually passed through the Patent Shaft site, and an Automotive Component Park was opened on another part of the site on 2 March 1993. This development - exclusively occupied by car component manufacturers - was the first of its kind in Europe.

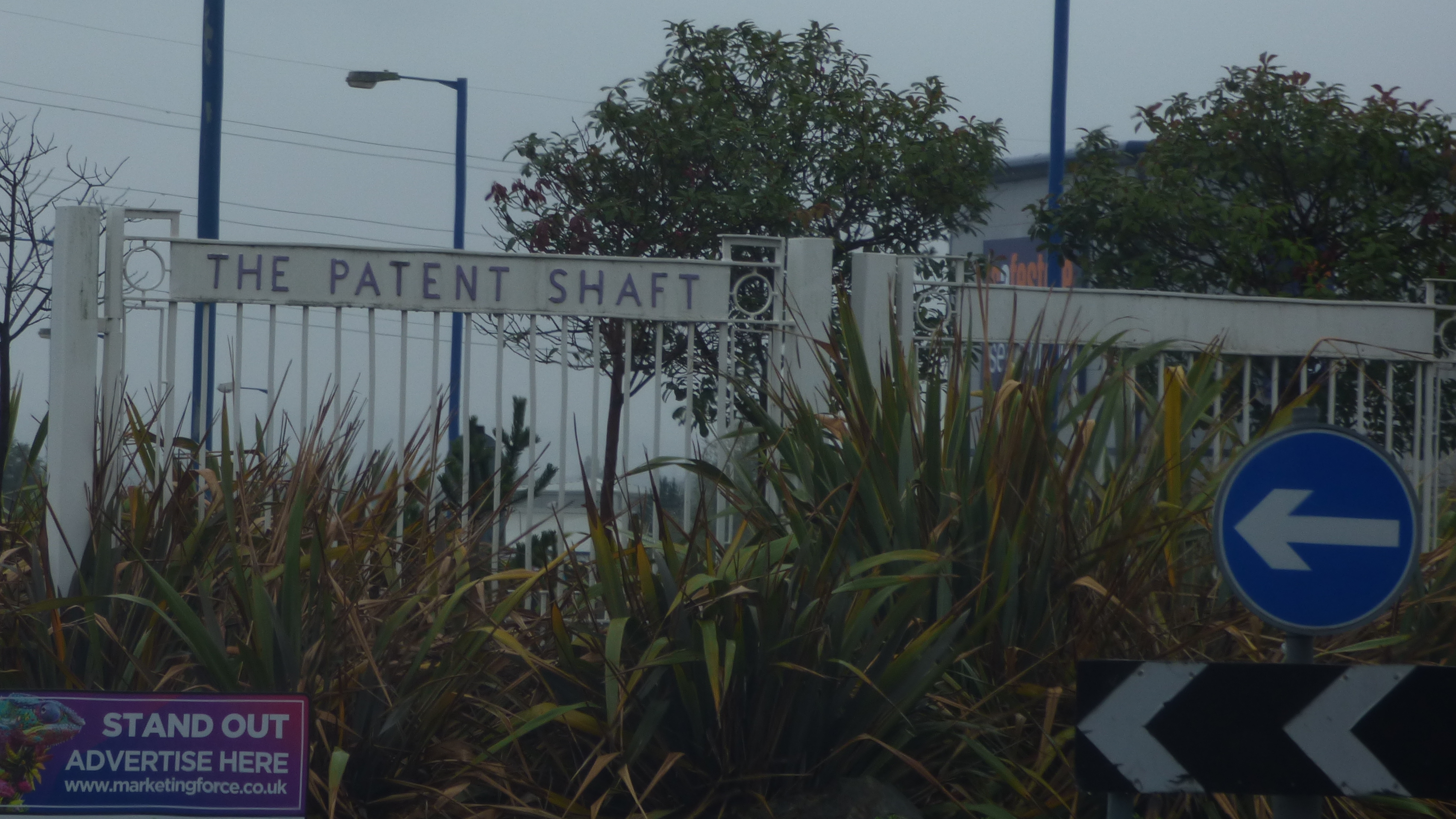
Factory gates, Dudley Street, Wednesbury, seen in 2018

The Patent Shaft factory gates still exist, situated on a traffic island in Wednesbury at the junction of Holyhead Road and Dudley Street, having been moved from their original location around 30 years after the factory’s closure. (Note: Factory gates coordinates: 52.5520788°N 2.0247664°W)

The archives of Patent Shaft are held at Sandwell Community History and Archives Service.
