= Edward Perry (industrialist) =

British politician, Industrialist (1800–1869)

Alderman Edward Perry
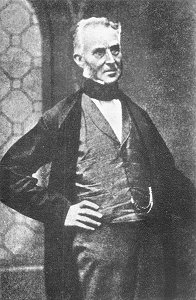
- Alderman Edward Perry
- Born: Edward Perry; 15 November 1800; Wolverhampton, Staffordshire, England
- Died: 2 March 1869 (aged 68); Wolverhampton, Staffordshire, England
- Occupation: Tinplate works master
- Known for: Twice Mayor of Wolverhampton, main founder of Wolverhampton Chamber of Commerce

Edward Perry (15 November 1800 – 2 March 1869), was an English tinplate works master and twice Mayor of Wolverhampton.

== Early life ==
Edward Perry was born on 15 November 1800 in Wolverhampton, to Richard Perry and Sarah. He attended Wolverhampton Grammar School.

== Tin plate ==
After leaving school he became a japanner, eventually leaving to set up his own company. The business quickly outgrew its site and moved to new premises. Perry built up a very successful tin plate works that grew faster and larger than the similar business, Richard Perry & Son, created by his father and brother. Following his death, his business was absorbed into the other family firm, eventually becoming part of John Marston's Sunbeam works.

== Politics ==
He was twice elected Mayor of Wolverhampton, 1855—1856 and 1856—1857, during a period of dispute between the council and the Wolverhampton Waterworks Company which had left the council with a considerable deficit. He organised a voluntary rate collection to resolve the situation.

He was mainly responsible for the creation of the Wolverhampton Chamber of Commerce.

== Later life ==
Perry lived with his wife Sophia at Stonley House, Wolverhampton, then Danes Court, Tettenhall, Staffordshire. He died on 2 March 1869.

Political offices
Preceded by James Shipton	Mayor of Wolverhampton; 1855–1857	Succeeded by Moses Ironmonger
