= Edward Perry (Scottish footballer) =

Scottish footballer (1934–2019)

Personal information
- Full name: Edward Andrew George Perry
- Date of birth: 30 April 1934
- Place of birth: Edinburgh, Scotland
- Date of death: 2019 (aged 85)
- Place of death: Edinburgh, Scotland
- Position: Outside forward

Senior career*
Years	Team	Apps	(Gls)
1957–1958	Queen's Park	11	(1)
1958	Falkirk	0	(0)
1958–1959	Raith Rovers	5	(0)

International career
1958	Scotland Amateurs	2	(0)
- * Club domestic league appearances and goals

Edward Andrew George Perry (30 April 1934 – 2019) was a Scottish football outside forward who played in the Scottish League for Queen's Park and Raith Rovers. He was capped by Scotland at amateur level. Perry died in Edinburgh in 2019, at the age of 85.
