= Moses Ironmonger =

English rope manufacturer (c.1809–1887)

- Born: Moses Ironmonger c. 1809; London, Middlesex, England
- Died: 25 November 1887 (aged 78); Wolverhampton, Staffordshire, England
- Occupation: Rope manufacturer
- Known for: Twice Mayor of Wolverhampton, provincial telephone pioneer

Moses Ironmonger (c. 1809 – 25 November 1887) was a successful rope manufacturer who, although an orphan from humble beginnings, twice became Mayor of Wolverhampton (1857–58 and 1868–69).

== Ironmonger & Co Ltd. ==
Ironmonger built up a very successful business manufacturing rope, first at Cock Street then a larger site at Gt Brickkiln Street, now the Baynell Building. Ironmonger & Co Ltd. carried on for two further generations until it finally went into liquidation in 1902.

=== Provincial telephone pioneer ===
He was a friend of the inventor of the telephone, Alexander Graham Bell, and in 1880 the first telephone line in Wolverhampton was laid between Ironmonger's factory and the company's offices, a mile away, barely four years after Bell's demonstration of clear speech on a telephone transmission.

== Politics ==
A Liberal supporter, Ironmonger was appointed Chief Magistrate in 1857, served as a governor for the Wolverhampton Grammar School and president of the Wolverhampton Chamber of Commerce. He twice served as Mayor of Wolverhampton, 1857–1858 and 1868–1869.

== Parish Church of St John the Evangelist ==
Ironmonger was a leading member of the Parish Church of St John the Evangelist. He presented a stained glass window by Ward and Hughes of London, in 1882. He also paid for the encaustic tiling around the font.

== Family ==
Ironmonger was born c. 1809 in London, England, and orphaned at 18 years of age, when his father, ropemaker Aaron Ironmonger, died in 1827. He married Mary Ann, née Perry, in 1832 in Wolverhampton, and they had two sons before she died in 1835. He married Elizabeth née Bosworth in 1841, also in Wolverhampton, and lived at the business in Cock Street, now Victoria Street. They had two daughters. He died in Graisley, Wolverhampton, in 1887, after a long illness.

Political offices
Preceded by Edward Perry	Mayor of Wolverhampton; 1857–1858	Succeeded by Edward Hartley
Preceded by James Langman	Mayor of Wolverhampton; 1868–1869	Succeeded by Thomas Bantock
