= Albert Baldwin Bantock =

Alderman Albert Baldwin Bantock
- Born: 6 April 1862; Wolverhampton, Staffordshire, England
- Died: 8 February 1938 (aged 75); Merridale House, Wolverhampton, Staffordshire, England
- Occupations: Coal and iron agent
- Known for: Mayor of Wolverhampton

Albert Baldwin Bantock (6 April 1862–8 February 1938), served as Mayor of Wolverhampton for three terms.

== Early life ==
Born in Wolverhampton on 6 April 1862, the second son of Thomas Bantock, also a mayor of Wolverhampton, and he was educated at Tettenhall College before joining the family firm of Thomas Bantock & Co., coal and iron agents. Bantock was brought up in the family home, Merridale House, now Bantock House, and lived there for the rest of his life, spending time and money improving it.

== Politics ==
External image
- Albert Baldwin Bantock, Wolverhampton City Council 2005

Bantock was a Liberal supporter and was elected to the town council in 1900. He was chairman of the finance committee and served as Mayor of Wolverhampton in 1905/06, 1906/07 and again in 1914/15. Bantock is credited with bringing several improvements to the town including the West Front gardens at St Peter's and changes to Queen Square.

Bantock was both a borough and a county magistrate, and in 1920 he was appointed High Sheriff of Staffordshire.

== Personal life ==
He was a member of the Congregational Church becoming Senior Deacon; served as a board member at several hospitals and was a generous benefactor. In 1926 he received the Freedom of the Borough.

He died in 1938. In his will he left the house and land to his wife on the understanding that on her death it would pass to the people of the town. The Corporation now run it as Bantock House Museum and Park.

Political offices
Preceded by Richard Evans Willoughby Berrington	Mayor of Wolverhampton; 1905–1907	Succeeded by Fred Evans
Preceded by Frederick Howard Skidmore	Mayor of Wolverhampton; 1914–1915	Succeeded by Arthur Charles Skidmore
