= St Bartholomew's Church, Wednesbury =

Church in West Midlands, England

Church of St Bartholomew
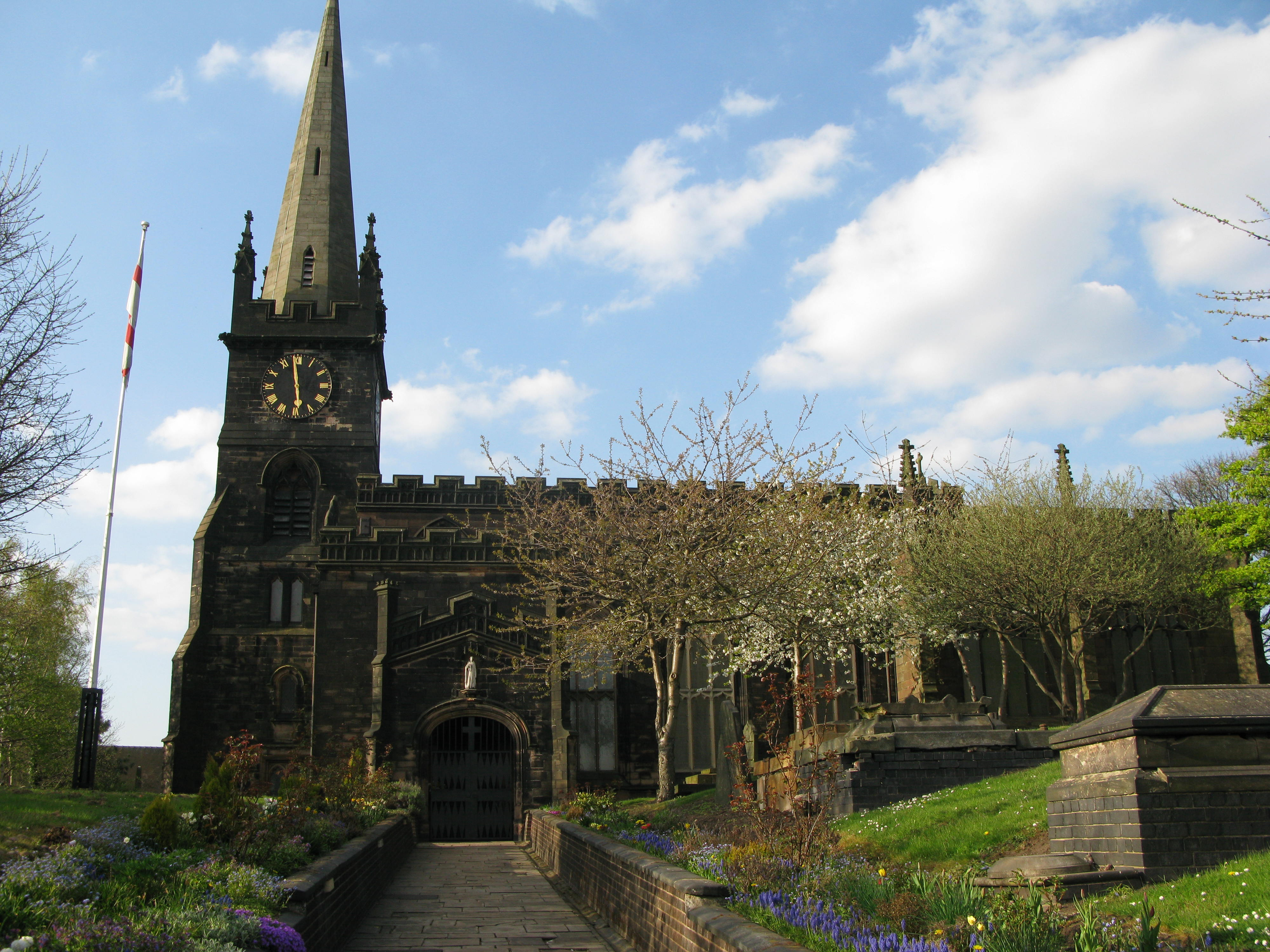
- Church of St Bartholomew
- 52°33′21″N 2°01′13″W
- OS grid reference: SO 98718 95344
- Location: Wednesbury, West Midlands
- Country: England
- Denomination: Church of England
- Website: www.stbartswednesbury.com

Architecture
- Heritage designation: Grade II
- Designated: 2 March 1950

Administration
- Diocese: Lichfield

St Bartholomew's Church is an Anglican church in Wednesbury in West Midlands, England. It is in the Diocese of Lichfield. The building, with medieval remains, was rebuilt and much modified in later centuries. It is Grade II listed.

== History and description ==
The church is built of sandstone ashlar. The nave has north and south aisles, and five-bay arcades, and there is a clerestory. The chancel, lower than the nave, has a three-sided apse. The west tower has an embattled parapet and an octagonal stone spire.

The earliest reference to a church in Wednesbury is in the plea rolls of 1210–1211; there is no evidence of an earlier church. It was rebuilt in the late 15th or early 16th century. Early features include the tower arch, thought to date from the 14th century; the pulpit bears the date 1611, and there is a 17th-century table tomb in the west end of the nave, on which are alabaster effigies of Richard Parkes (died 1618) and his wife Dorothy.

The church was partially restored in the mid-18th century: the top 16 feet of the tower was rebuilt, and the nave roof was repaired. In 1775 part of the south transept was enclosed to form a vestry. In 1827 the north transept was created and the nave was extended; a new font, presented by the Rev. Isaac Clarkson, was installed. The spire was raised by 12 feet in 1878.

The interior was restored in 1885 and the galleries were removed, and there was restoration of the north and south transepts in 1902–03. Sixteen windows have stained glass, of the late 19th and early 20th century, by Charles Eamer Kempe.
