= List of mayors of Wolverhampton =

This is a list of mayors of Wolverhampton in the West Midlands of England, historically part of Staffordshire. Wolverhampton has elected a town council, which in turn has elected a Mayor, since 1848.

== Mayors of Wolverhampton ==
=== 19th century ===
| No. | Image | Mayor | Tenure | Terms | Notes |
|---|---|---|---|---|---|
| 1 | | George Benjamin Thorneycroft | 1848/49 | 1 | Ironmaster. First Mayor of Wolverhampton. |
| 2 | | George Robinson | 1849/50 | 1 | Solicitor |
| 3 | | Joseph Walker | 1850/51 | 1 | Confectioner. St Mary's Ward. |
| 4 | | William Warner | 1851/52 | 1 | Draper, borough magistrate |
| 5 | | Jeremiah Wynn | 1852/53 | 1 | Factor, Earp & Wynn, St John's Square. Borough magistrate. |
| 6 | | John Neve | 1853/54 | 1 | Ironmonger and nail manufacturer, Magistrate |
| 7 | | James Shipton | 1854/55 | 1 | Timber merchant and licensed carrier |
| 8 | | Edward Perry | 1855/57 | 2 | Japanning and tinplate works owner. Tenure extended due dispute between the council and the Wolverhampton Waterworks Company. County and borough magistrate. St John's Ward. |
| 9 | | Moses Ironmonger | 1857/58 | 1 | Rope and twine factory owner, chief magistrate and president of the Wolverhampton Chamber of Commerce |
| 10 | | John Hartley | 1858/59 | 1 | Ironmaster and borough magistrate. |
| 11 | | Benjamin Hicklin | 1859/60 | 1 | Carrier, railway agent and farmer. Borough magistrate. |
| 12 | | Charles Clarke | 1860/61 | 1 | Grocer, merchant and general warehouseman. St George's Ward. |
| 13 | | George Lees Underhill | c. 27 November 1861—1862 | 1 | Iron merchant. Led the people of Wolverhampton in a subscription to raise funds to erect a statue in the memory of Prince Albert. Borough magistrate, JP. |
| 14 | | Henry Hartley Fowler | 1862/63 | 1 | Solicitor. Borough magistrate. Afterwards Viscount Wolverhampton |
| 15 | | John Hawksford | 1863/64 | 1 | Attorney & solicitor, First Catholic Mayor of Wolverhampton |
| 16 | | John Ford | 1864/65 | 1 | Hardware merchant |
| 17 | | Joseph Crowther Smith | 1865/66 | 1 | Solicitor |
| 18 | | Sir John Morris, | 1866/67 | 1 | Artificial manure manufacturer and farmer. St Paul's Ward. |
| 19 | | James Langman | 1867/68 | 1 | Master pawnbroker. St George's Ward. |
| 20 | | Moses Ironmonger | 1868/69 | 1 | Rope and twine factory owner. Chief magistrate. Second term as Mayor of Wolverhampton |
| 21 | | Thomas Bantock | 1869/70 | 1 | Ironmaster and industrialist |
| 22 | | James Walker | 1870/71 | 1 | Estate agent |
| 23 | | Joseph Ford | 1871/72 | 1 | Foreign merchant |
| 24 | | Isaac Jenks | 1872/73 | 1 | Ironmaster. Donated the gold chain and badge of office still in use today |
| 25 | | William Highfield Jones | 1873/74 | 1 | Built one of the largest japanning businesses in Wolverhampton. Borough magistrate. St John's Ward. |
| 26 | | William Edwards | 1874/75 | 1 | Edge tool manufacturer and JP. |
| 27 | | John Clarkson Major | 1875/76 | 1 | Yorkshire-born chemist, set up first tar distillery in Wolverhampton |
| 28 | | Samuel Dickinson | 1876/77 | 1 | Iron merchant & broker. Borough magistrate. |
| 29 | | David Kendrick | 1877/78 | 1 | Ironmaster |
| 30 | | John Jones | 1878/81 | 3 | Ironmaster. Opened West Park, the first of Wolverhampton's large parks. Second longest number of consecutive terms as Mayor (3) |
| 31 | | Herbert C Owen | 1881/82 | 1 | Solicitor |
| 32 | | Francis Davis Gibbons | 1882/83 | 1 | Agricultural artificial manure manufacturer. Borough magistrate. St James's Ward. |
| 33 | | John Brotherton | 1883/84 | 1 | Master Tube manufacturer. St George's Ward. |
| 34 | | John Annan | 1884/85 | 1 | Chief engineer and manager, Wolverhampton Gas Company. Dunstall Ward. Borough magistrate. |
| 35 | | Joseph G Wright | 1885/86 | 1 | Ironmaster |
| 36 | | Thomas Vincent Jackson | 1886/87 | 1 | Surgeon. First member of the medical profession to become Mayor. Borough magistrate. St Peter's Ward. |
| 37 | | Joseph Jones | 1887/88 | 1 | Ironmaster. Borough magistrate. St Matthew's Ward. |
| 38 | | Frederic Edward Manby | 1888/89 | 1 | Surgeon |
| 39 | | John Marston | 1889/91 | 2 | Motorcycle and car manufacturer (Sunbeam). Borough Magistrate. Merridale Ward. |
| 40 | | James Saunders | 1891/92 | 1 | Iron broker and agent |
| 41 | | Charles Tertius Mander | 1892/96 | 4 | Created baronet 1911. Longest number of consecutive terms as mayor (four). Park Ward. |
| 42 | | Stephen Craddock | 1896/97 | 1 | Owner with brother George of Craddock Bros, boot and shoe manufacturers of Wolverhampton. Born Northamptonshire 1853, died 1925. St George's Ward. Borough magistrate. |
| 43 | | Alexander McBean | 1897/98 | 1 | Iron merchant. Borough magistrate, JP. Blakenhall Ward. |
| 44 | | Price Lewis | 1898/99 | 2 | Master tailor. Borough magistrate. Graiseley Ward. |
| 45 | | Samuel Theodore Mander | 1899-September 1900 | 1 | Varnish manufacturer. Died in office, 14 September 1900. St Mark's Ward. |

=== 20th century ===
| No. | Image | Mayor | Tenure | Terms | Notes |
|---|---|---|---|---|---|
| 46 | | Price Lewis | 1900 (September–November) | 1 | Master Tailor. JP |
| 47 | | John Walton Hamp | 1900 (November)–1901 | 1 | Surgeon & Chief Magistrate. St John's Ward. |
| 48 | | Charles Paulton Plant | 1901/02 | 1 | Wine merchant & brewer. St Peter's Ward. Chairman Streets Committee. |
| 49 | | George Rennie Thorne | 1902/03 | 1 | Liberal. Solicitor & Lay preacher. St Matthew's Ward. |
| 50 | | Levi Johnson | 1903/04 | 1 | (29 May 1850 - 12 August 1937) Brewer & Wine merchant. First treasurer of Wolverhampton Wanderers. Elected to Town Council in 1881 St John's Ward. Borough Magistrate in 1899, in 1900, Honorary Freeman of the Borough in 1926. Daughter called Alice Wulfrun Bayley Johnson born during mayoralty. Pioneer of cycle trade and chairman of Star Motor Company. Chairman of Wolverhampton Freeholders Permanent Building Society. |
| 51 | | Richard Evans Willoughby Berrington | 1904/05 | 1 | Civil engineer |
| 52 | | Albert Baldwin Bantock | 1905–1907 | 2 | Coal & Iron agent, High Sheriff of Staffordshire |
| 53 | | Fred Evans | 1907/08 | 1 | |
| 54 | | Edward Lewis Cullwick | 1908–1909 (April) | 1 | Harness manufacturer. Died in Office, 1 April 1909 |
| 55 | | Fred Evans | 1909 (April–November) | 1 | |
| 56 | | John Grout | 1909 (November)–1910 | 1 | Physician And surgeon |
| 57 | | Charles Thomas Richards | 1910/11 | 1 | Pawnbroker And Jeweller |
| 58 | | Thomas William Dickinson | 1911–1913 | 2 | Fruit merchant & farmer |
| 59 | | Frederick Howard Skidmore | 1913/14 | 1 | Auctioneer & Valuer |
| 60 | | Albert Baldwin Bantock | 1914/15 | 1 | First Mayor to stand for a third term |
| 61 | | Arthur Charles Skidmore | 1915–1917 | 2 | (c. 1865–28 May 1940) Solicitor, Borough Coroner |
| 62 | | John Francis Myatt | 1917/18 | 1 | Brewer |
| 63 | | Alfred George Jeffs | 1918/19 | 1 | Wholesale grocer |
| 64 | | Thomas Austin Henn | 1919/20 | 1 | (c. 1871–6 May 1948), Jeweller. Freeman of Wolverhampton. |
| 65 | | James Thompson | 1920–1922 | 2 | (c. 1864, Bilston–1934), Chairman of John Thompson Ltd., manufacturers. High Sheriff of Staffordshire, he lived at Ludstone Hall, Claverley. He was injured in a fall from a horse in 1933 and died the following year |
| 66 | | Thomas Frost | 1922/23 | 1 | (c. 1864–22 May 1953) Founder of Thomas Frost Shopfitting |
| 67 | | Joseph Clark | 1923–1925 | 2 | |
| 68 | | Frederick Albert Willcock | 1925–1927 | 2 | Retired chemist |
| 69 | | Albert Edward Wood | 1927–1929 | 2 | |
| 70 | | Alan Davies | 1929/30 | 1 | (c. 1874–24 January 1954) |
| 71 | | Joseph Haddock | 1930/31 | 1 | (c. 1874–25 June 1957), later manager of the Star and Garter Hotel. |
| 72 | | John Lewis | 1931–1932 (February) | 1 | Died in Office, 25 February 1932 |
| 73 | | Joseph Haddock | 1932 (March–November) | 1 | Elected Mayor for remainder of Municipal year |
| 74 | | Sir Charles Arthur Mander (Baronet) | 1932 (November)–1933 | 1 | Alderman |
| 75 | | Bertram Kidson | 1933/34 | 1 | Chartered Accountant |
| 76 | | Morris Christopher | 1934/35 | 1 | |
| 77 | | James Whittaker | 1935/36 | 1 | (c. 1866–3 April 1940). Died following a motor car accident near Ascot. |
| 78 | | Sir Charles Arthur Mander (Baronet) | 1936/37 | 1 | |
| 79 | | Richard Ernest Probert | 1937/38 | 1 | |
| 80 | | George Edwin John Luce | 1938/39 | 1 | |
| 81 | | Harry Austin White | 1939/40 | 1 | (c. 1883–24 November 1947) |
| 82 | | Albert Abraham Beach | 1940/41 | 1 | |
| 83 | | George Bates | 1941/42 | 1 | |
| 84 | | Anacletus Byrne-Quinn | 1942/43 | 1 | Physician & Surgeon, MB BS MRCS Eng. LRCP Lond. The Poplars, Third Ave., Low Hill, Fallings Park. (13 July 1903—1987 W'ton) |
| 85 | | Frederick Stephen Thompson | 1943/44 | 1 | (c. 1871–27 March 1945) Boiler Works Manager |
| 86 | | Thomas William Phillipson | 1944/45 | 1 | Former Wolves footballer and prolific striker. |
| 87 | | William Lawley | 1945/46 | 1 | |
| 88 | | Cyril Bernard Vincent Taylor | 1946/47 | 1 | |
| 89 | | Herbert Edwin Lane | 10 November 1947–23 May 49 | 2 | |
| 90 | | Henry "Harry" Bowdler | 1949/50 | 1 | (c. 1889–1 April 1957) |
| 91 | | Louis Reginald Guy | 1950/51 | 1 | (1899 W'ton—1974 W'ton) |
| 92 | | James Beattie | 1951/52 | 1 | Joint Managing Director of James Beattie Ltd., grandson of the founder. (chairman and managing director in 1961) |
| 93 | | Harold Thomas Fullwood | 1952/53 | 1 | |
| 94 | | Alice Annie Braybrook | 18 May 1953–1954 | 1 | Wolverhampton's first woman Mayor. |
| 95 | | Leonard James Woolridge | 24 May 1954/55 | 1 | |
| 96 | | Frank Mansell | 23 May 1955/56 | 1 | |
| 97 | | George Rastall | 28 May 1956/57 | 1 | |
| 98 | | Ruby Florence Ilsley | 20 May 1957–1958 | 1 | |
| 99 | | John Clement Horner | 1958/59 | 1 | |
| 100 | | Norman Frank Bagley | 1959/60 | 1 | |
| 101 | | Harold Marsh | 1960/61 | 1 | |
| 102 | | Charles Herbert Davies | 1961/62 | 1 | |
| 103 | | Malcolm Pascal Birch | 1962/63 | 1 | |
| 104 | | Herbert Preece | 1963/64 | 1 | |
| 105 | | Harry Bagley | 1964/65 | 1 | |
| 106 | | Frank Clapham | 1965/66 | 1 | |
| 107 | | Frank Stanley Smith | 1966/67 | 1 | |
| 108 | | Edward (Ted) Yardley Fullwood | 1967/68 | 1 | |
| 109 | | Robert Campbell | 1968/69 | 1 | |
| 110 | | Stanley Steventon Tatem | 1969/70 | 1 | |
| 111 | | Gerald Anthony Guy | 1970/71 | 1 | |
| 112 | | Francis Victor Law | 1971/72 | 1 | |
| 113 | | Arthur Storer | 1972/73 | 1 | |
| 114 | | Dennis Arthur Birch | 1973/74 | 1 | |
| 115 | | Samuel Herbert Reynolds | 1974/75 | 1 | |
| 116 | | Edward Mitchell | 1975/76 | 1 | |
| 117 | | Arthur Ernest Steventon | 1976/77 | 1 | |
| 118 | | Jessie Emma Beddoes | 1977/78 | 1 | |
| 119 | | Violet Amy Fletcher | 1978/79 | 1 | |
| 120 | | Ian George Claymore | 1979/80 | 1 | |
| 121 | | Herbert Edwin Lane | 1980/81 | 1 | 2nd term as Mayor |
| 122 | | Ernest William Bold | 1981/82 | 1 | |
| 123 | | John Arthur Morey | 1982/83 | 1 | |
| 124 | | Alfred Christopher Laws | 1983/84 | 1 | |
| 125 | | Stanley Arthur Ledsam | 1984/85 | 1 | |
| 126 | | George Fredrick Howells | 1985/86 | 1 | |
| 127 | | Bishan Dass | 1986/87 | 1 | Labour, Ettingshall Ward, first elected 1 May 1975. |
| 128 | | Doreen Mildred Seiboth | 1987/88 | 1 | |
| 129 | | Philip Reginald Richards | 1988/89 | 1 | |
| 130 | | Richard Reynolds | 1989/90 | 1 | |
| 131 | | John Geraghty | 1990–1990 (October) | 1 | |
| 132 | | Richard Reynolds | 1990 (October)–1991 | 1 | 2nd term as Mayor |
| 133 | | Surjan Singh Duhra | 1991/92 | 1 | Labour, St Peter's Ward, election history from 4 May 1978 to 5 May 2011. |
| 134 | | Raymond Bert Swatman | 1992/93 | 1 | |
| 135 | | Richard Fredrick Whitehouse | 1993/94 | 1 | Liberal Independent, Spring Vale Ward, first elected 3 May 1984. |
| 136 | | Stanley Arthur Ledsam | 1994/95 | 1 | 2nd term as Mayor |
| 137 | | Margaret Mary Benton | 1995/96 | 1 | Labour, Bilston North Ward, election history from 2 May 1991 to 1 May 2003. |
| 138 | | George Fredrick Howells | 1996/97 | 1 | 2nd term as Mayor |
| 139 | | Francis Docherty | 1997/98 | 1 | Labour, East Park Ward, election history from 2 May 1991 to 5 May 2011. |
| 140 | | Gwendoline (Gwen) Mary Stafford Good | 1998/99 | 1 | |
| 141 | | Peter Alan Bilson | 1999/2000 | 1 | Labour, Bushbury South and Low Hill Ward, first elected 6 May 1982. |

=== 21st century ===
| No. | Image | Mayor | Tenure | Terms | Notes |
|---|---|---|---|---|---|
| 142 | | Tersaim Singh | 2000/01 | 1 | Labour, St Peter's Ward, first elected 3 May 1990. |
| 143 | | Joyce Hill | 2001/02 | 1 | Labour, Fallings Park Ward, election history from 8 May 1986 to 17 May 2006. |
| 144 | | Robert Hart | 2002/03 | 1 | Conservative (I & II) and Independent (III), Merry Hill Ward (I, II & III), election history from 3 May 1973 to 16 Jan 4 May 1995 (I), 25 Sep 1997 to 25 Jan 2007 (II) and from 25 Jan 2007 to 14 May 2008 (III). |
| 145 | | John Jeffery Rowley | 2003/04 | 1 | Labour, Blakenhall Ward, first elected 6 May 1982. |
| 146 | | Alan Hart | 2004/05 | 1 | Conservative (I) and Independent (II), Penn Ward (I & II), election history from 6 May 1976 to 16 Jan 2007 (I) and 17 Jan 2007 to 16 May 2007 (II). |
| 147 | | Phil Bateman | 2005/06 | 1 | Labour, Wednesfield North Ward, first elected 3 May 1984. |
| 148 | | John Davis | 2006/07 | 1 | Conservative, Tettenhall Regis Ward, election history from 4 May 1978 to 6 May 1982 and 5 May 1983 to 3 May 2012. |
| 149 | | Trudy Bowen | 2007/08 | 1 | Labour, Bilston North Ward, election history from 8 May 1986 to 14 May 2008. |
| 150 | | Christine Valerie Mills | 2008/09 | 1 | Conservative, Merry Hill Ward, first elected 7 May 1987. |
| 151 | | Surjan Singh Duhra | 2009/10 | 1 | Second term as Mayor |
| 152 | | Malcolm John Gwinnett | 2010/11 | 1 | Liberal Democrat, Spring Vale Ward, first elected 3 May 1990. |
| 153 | | Thomas "Bert" Turner | 2011/12 | 1 | Labour, Bilston East Ward, first elected 6 December 1990. |
| 154 | | Christine Valerie Mills | 16 May 2012/13 | 1 | Second term as Mayor. |
| 155 | | Milkinder Jaspal | 15 May 2013/14 | 1 | Labour, Heath Town Ward, election history from 2 May 1991 to 14 May 2008 and from 5 Feb 2009. |
| 156 | | Michael Heap | 2014/15 | 1 | Liberal Democrat, Spring Vale Ward. |
| 157 | | Ian Brookfield | 2015/16 | 1 | Labour, Fallings Park Ward |
| 158 | | Barry Findlay | 2016/17 | 1 | Conservative, Tettenhall Regis Ward |
| 159 | | Elias Mattu | 2017–February 2018 | 1 | Labour, Graiseley Ward Died in Office, 23 February 2018. Mayoral duties are being carried out by the Deputy Mayor, Phil Page until a new Mayor is elected at the Council meeting on 16 May 2018. |
| 160 | | Phil Page | 2018/19 | 1 | Labour, Bilston North Ward |
| 161 | | Claire Darke | 2019/21 | 2 | (Served 2 years due to COVID19 pandemic) Labour, Park Ward |
| 162 | | Greg Brackenridge | 2021/22 | 1 | Labour, Wednesfield South Ward |
| 163 | | Sandra Samuels | 2022/23 | 1 | Labour, Ettingshall Ward |
| 164 | | Michael Hardacre | 2023/24 | 1 | Labour, Park Ward |
| 165 | | Linda Leach | 2024/25 | 1 | Labour, Bilston North Ward |
| 166 | | Craig Collingswood | 2025/26 | 1 | Labour, Park Ward |
| 167 | | Paul Singh | 2026/27 | - | Labour, Penn Ward; Sprinter Matt Hudson-Smith also served in the role for one day in September 2026 |
