= John Hawksford =

English solicitor and politician (1806–1887)

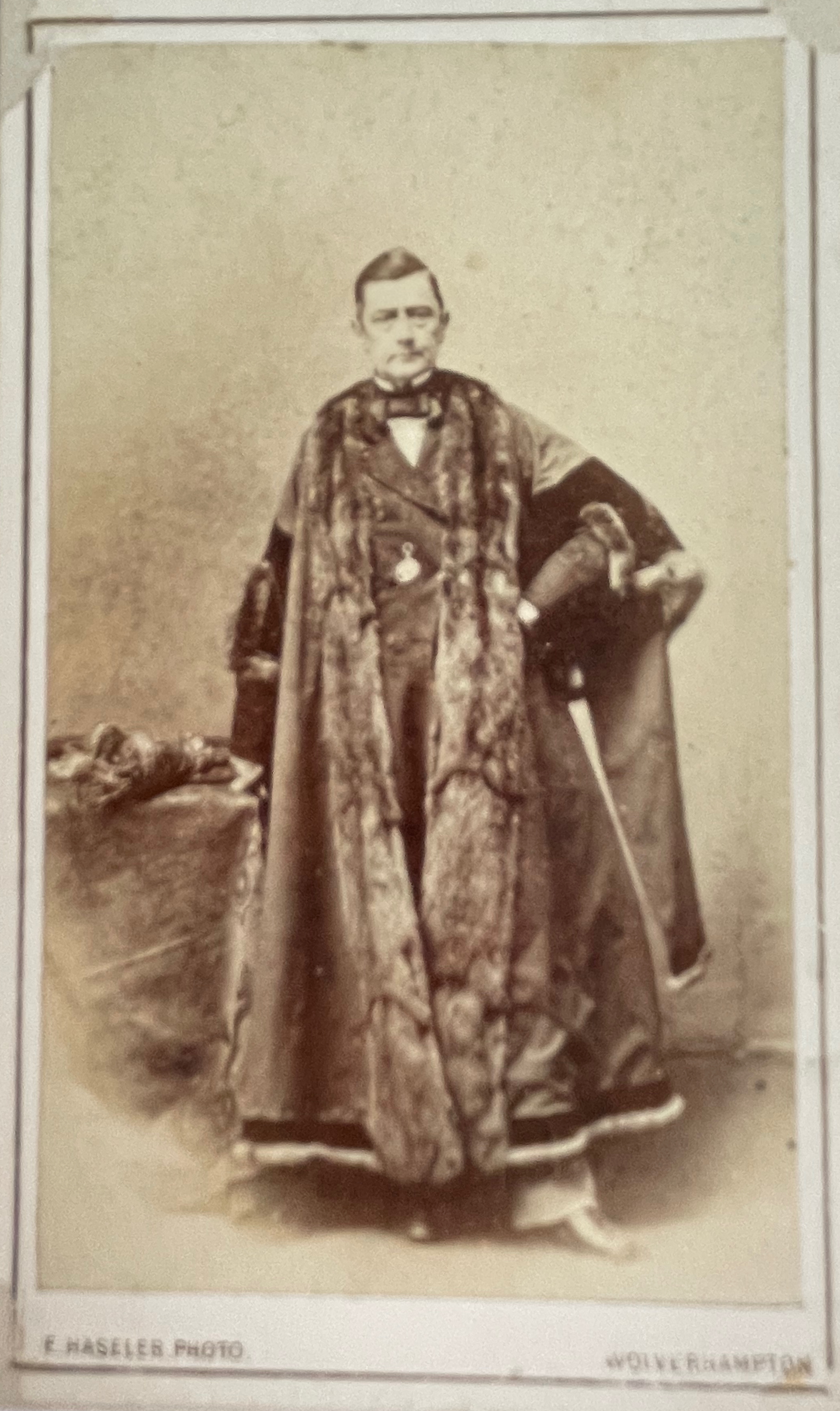
- John Hawksford
- Born: 5 October 1806; Aston, Warwickshire, England
- Died: 3 September 1887 (aged 80); Wolverhampton, Staffordshire, England
- Occupation(s): Solicitor and attorney
- Known for: Mayor of Wolverhampton; Catholic

John Hawksford (5 October 1806—3 September 1887) was a successful and wealthy solicitor and attorney, a prominent member of the Roman Catholic laity of Wolverhampton, who also served as mayor of Wolverhampton from 1863/64, becoming the first Roman Catholic to do so.

== Church ==
Hawksford had converted to Catholicism and by the late 1840s become a prominent member of the Roman Catholic lay community in Wolverhampton. At a cost of £2,000, he purchased land from the agent to the Duke of Cleveland for the construction of a new Roman Catholic church for the town. He battled with the Bishop of Birmingham, William Ullathorne over funds for the works, and letters show that this continued through to the laying of the foundation stone for what was to become the church of St Mary and St John.

== Politics ==
Hawksford served as mayor of Wolverhampton in 1863/64.

== Family ==
Hawksford was born on 5 October 1806 in Aston, Warwickshire, the son of Samuel Hawksford and Elizabeth née Cope. He arrived in Wolverhampton in 1821 and converted to Catholicism aged 26, probably at the time of his marriage. He had six children. His wife died in 1849, and Hawksford remarried in 1853. He had no further children and died on 3 September 1887.

Political offices
Preceded by Henry Hartley Fowler	Mayor of Wolverhampton; 1863–1864	Succeeded by John Ford
