= Thomas Bantock =

British businessman and politician

- Born: 2 October 1823; Golspie, Sutherland, Scotland
- Died: 20 July 1895, aged 71; Wolverhampton, Staffordshire, England
- Occupations: Ironmaster and Industrialist
- Known for: Mayor of Wolverhampton, benefactor

Thomas Bantock (2 October 1823 – 20 July 1895) was a Scottish-born businessman and politician who served as Mayor of Wolverhampton from 1869 to 1870.

== Early life ==
The son of Benjamin Bantock, a provision merchant and sometime gamekeeper to Elizabeth, Countess of Sutherland, and brother of George Granvllle Bantock, surgeon, who was father of the composer Granville Bantock. He excelled at school in Sutherland and was sent to Wolverhampton as an agent for the Trustees of the Duke of Bridgewater. By 1861 he was District Agent but also worked for the Great Western Railway.

== Thos. Bantock & Co. ==
He then set up his own business, Thos. Bantock & Co. which grew rapidly. By 1866 he was an ironmaster, mined coal and built boats and wagons.

== Politics ==
Bantock was a Liberal supporter and was elected to the town council in 1861. He was one of the escorts for Queen Victoria during her visit to Wolverhampton to unveil the statue of her late husband, Albert, Prince Consort.

== Personal life ==
He was a member of the Congregational Church. Along with fellow church members he set up Tettenhall College as a school for students from poor families. He was now in a position to move his family into a large mansion, Merridale House, now known as Bantock House. He continued to serve the town, and the church and was a generous benefactor. He died in 1895. In his will, he left the house and land to his son Albert Baldwin Bantock. He is still remembered for his small herd of highland cattle that he kept at Bantock Park, commemorated today in a bronze statue near the house.

Political offices
Preceded by Moses Ironmonger	Mayor of Wolverhampton; 1869–1870	Succeeded by James Walker
