= Villiers Engineering =

Historical motorcycle manufacturer

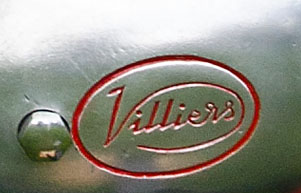
- Industry: Manufacturing
- Founder: 1898
- Defunct: 1966
- Headquarters: Wolverhampton, England
- Products: Motorcycles

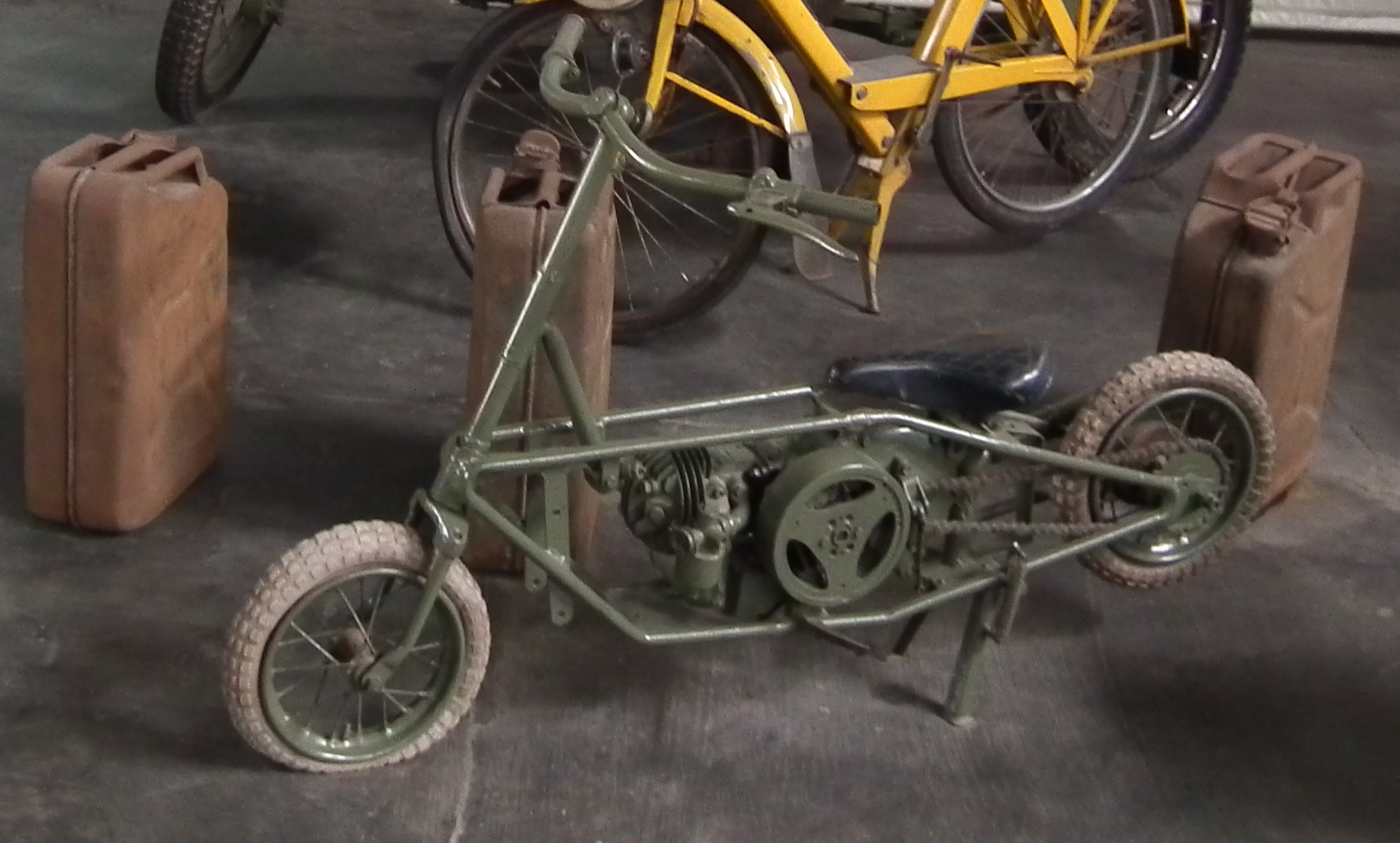
Villiers Junior, a folding military welbike motorbike of WW2 era

Villiers Engineering was a manufacturer of motorcycles and cycle parts, and an engineering company based in Villiers Street, Wolverhampton, England.

== Early history ==
In the 1890s John Marston's Sunbeam had become extremely successful by relying on high quality of production and finish. But Marston was dissatisfied with the pedals on his machines, which he bought in. In 1890 he dispatched his son Charles to the US on a selling trip, but included in his instructions that Charles must discuss pedal engineering with Pratt and Whitney in Hartford, Connecticut and come back with a high-class pedal and the machinery for making it. Charles said that the Villiers Engineering Co. was "the ultimate fruit" of his trip to the US, being impressed by the production system and the labour-saving devices. He pointed out that "it was not possible to develop these at Sunbeamland, which had long been working on another plan, but it was possible to start them in a new factory".

As a result of the tour, in 1898, John Marston bought a small Japanning works based in Villiers Street, Wolverhampton. Under the direction of Charles, the company made cycle parts for the Sunbeam company. As the factory was producing more parts than Sunbeam required, it sold components to other manufacturers.

1902 was a momentous year for Villiers. Firstly, John Marston sold the company to his son Charles for £6,000 on a loan against future profits. Secondly, it developed and patented the cycle free-wheel, which every cycle manufacturer required. The production of free wheels reached its peak just after the Second World War, as the company produced 80,000 per week or 4 million per year.

== Production pre–First World War ==
Apart from the production of freewheels outlined above, the company produced its first engine in early 1912, a 350 cc four-stroke complete with integral two-speed gearbox. Later that year it developed a 269 cc two-stroke (70mm bore and stroke) and the simplicity of this engine and attractive price made it a rapid success. During 1913 the Sun-Villers motorcycle was launched manufactured by the Sun Cycle & Fittings Co.

By 1914 the Villiers 269 cc 2-stroke engine had been adopted by a large number of motorcycle manufacturers, such as the Allday (Alldays & Onions), The Royal Ruby, The New Ryder, the Bown-Villiers, the Coventry-Eagle, the Gerrard, Sparkbrook, the Invicta (A. Barnett & Co), the Ixion, the Juno, and the Roulette.

In spite of the huge success of the 269 cc two-stroke, the four-stroke engine had not completely been shelved, as in October 1914, J.H Motors of Oldham announced two motorcycles, the No.1 fitted with a 2.75 hp Villiers four-stroke engine of 349 cc (74.5 x 80 mm bore and stroke), and a 2.5 hp two-stroke model using the Villiers 269 cc engine. Whether many of either model were made before war orders halted production in 1915 is unclear.

Other manufacturers known to use Villiers engines up to 1915 include the Campion, The Hobart, the Chater-Lea, the Diamond, and the Excelsior.

== Production during World War One ==
During World War One, in common with many firms not directly involved in making military transport, the Villiers factory changed to production of munitions, in particular fuses for 75mm shells. Companies engaged in war work still worked on new models anticipating the end of the war, with Villiers applying for 16 engine-related patents during the war. One particular issue was a generic problem – the fact that before the war most engines relied on German-made magnetos for ignition, which caused a major issue during the war. In January 1917 Villiers patented their solution to this problem – the flywheel-magneto, which became a standard feature of their engines.

== Production in the inter-war years ==
Immediately after the war Villiers picked up where they had left off, with supply of the 269 cc engine, now as the Mark II engine with different method of attaching the exhaust. By 1919 the bikes that used the Villiers engines included the Excelsior lightweight, the Diamond (D.F.& M. Engineering Co), the Royal Ruby, the Wolf Lightweight (Wulfruna Engineering), the Carfield, the Ruffells, the P.V. (Elliston & Fell), the Sparkbrook, the Yvel, the P&S lightweight (Pearson and Sopwith), the Chater-Lea, the Campion, the Victoria (of Glasgow), the Hobart, the Olympic, the Ixion, the Bown-Villiers, the Wilkin, and the Saltley. The engine remained much the same, and continued to use a separate magneto, though it did have an oil pump to provide crankcase and piston lubrication via a hollow crankcase bolt – a design that Villiers had patented during 1914/1915.

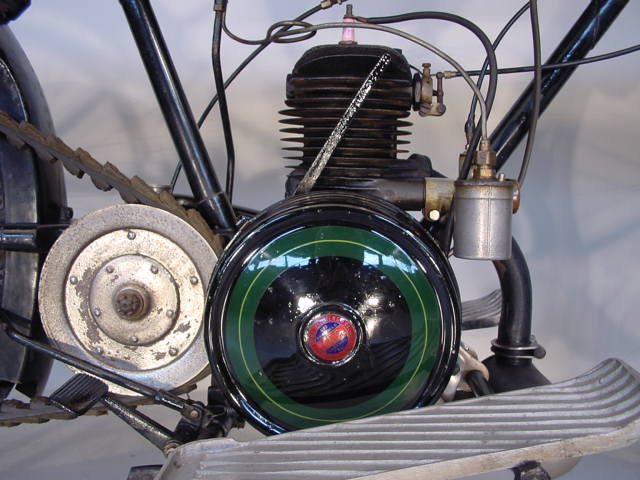
1926 Villiers 300 cc engine

The Mark III engine embodied some changes to crankcase and brushes in 1919/1920, and in March 1920 the new Villiers Mark IV engine complete with flywheel magneto was revealed. In May 1920 a new British Excelsior lightweight model was announced, this being the first motorcycle to show the new Villiers engine using the flywheel-magneto instead of a separate magneto.

In September 1922 Villiers announced the details of their new 1923 engine range, which included 147 cc, 250 cc and 343 cc engines. These engines featured a radial-finned cylinder head, with both the inlet and exhaust port being at the front of the engine, and they all had the Villiers flywheel-magneto. While the 147 cc relied on petrol-oil mixture for crankshaft lubrication, the two larger engines used a separate oil-feed system. The new 250 cc engine produced 25 per cent more power than the older 269 cc engine.

In 1926 Villiers introduced an even smaller engine, the 125 cc with twin exhaust ports and side-mounted carburettor, and in 1927 they introduced the 344 cc twin 2-stroke. Villiers were to go on to produce a wide range of single and twin cylinder 2-strokes primarily for motorcycle use. At the end of the 1920s they also started producing engines for stationary use, with the first model being the water-cooled WX11 and in 1933 the air-cooled Mar-vil. Villiers engines were also used in lawn mowers, for example the 147 cc engine was used in the Atco mowers of the 1920s and in 1931 it was joined by a 98 cc Villiers engine, known as the Midget.

The Villiers company also had links to the British Seagull outboard marine engines, both companies owing their existence to John Marston. The Seagull engines initially used the Villiers flywheel magneto, and a 'Seagull-Villiers' carburettor.

In 1936, L. E. Baynes and Sir John Carden, trading as Carden-Baynes Aircraft of Heston Aerodrome, launched the Carden-Baynes Auxiliary, a light aircraft which was essentially a motorized Abbott-Baynes Scud 3 glider. This carried a retractable 249 cc Villiers engine driving a push-propeller and producing 9 bhp, and the fuel tank held enough to run the engine for thirty minutes. The 249 cc Carden-Baynes Auxiliary is believed to be the lowest-powered aircraft in the history of powered flight.

== Production during the Second World War ==
During the war part of Villiers production was again turned to fuses for shells, with over 10 million produced, although they continued to make engines and cycleparts. Their engines were also used in small motorcycles designed for air drop with paratroopers – the Excelsior Welbike and the James ML paratrooper's machine known as the Clockwork Mouse.

== Post-war production ==
In 1956, Villiers produced its two millionth engine and presented it to the Science Museum in London.

In 1957 Villiers absorbed JA Prestwich Industries, makers of the J.A.P. engines. In 1962 the company were claiming that:

"jointly the two companies produce a vast range of two-stroke and four-stroke petrol engines and four-stroke diesel engines from 1/3 to 16 b.h.p. These are the engines which power many of Britain's two-stroke motor cycles, scooters and three wheelers, and the great majority of the motor mowers, cultivators, concrete mixers, generating sets, elevators, pumping sets. etc."

Villiers manufactured a range of single and twin two-stroke engines (from 98 cc to 325 cc) for light motorcycle and vehicle manufacturers until the 1960s.

In the early 1960s, the company was taken over by Manganese Bronze Holdings, and in 1966 together with AMC became Norton-Villiers, and in 1973 merged with the BSA group to become Norton Villiers Triumph, which eventually went into liquidation in 1976.

== Overseas manufacture ==
=== Australia ===
Australia was an important market for Villiers engines. In 1951 the Australian Government introduced import restrictions on engines. Following negotiations with the Australian Government, Villiers chairman Frank Farrer set up Villiers Australia Pty. Ltd. to manufacture Villiers engines in Australia. A 20 acres (8.1 ha) site was selected at Ballarat, Victoria and construction of a new factory started in 1953. Production of engines started in 1954 when the first of the factory buildings were completed. The third phase of construction was completed in 1957 and the factory officially opened by the Premier of Victoria, Henry Bolte.

The manufacturing rights of Wisconsin engines was purchased from the Merbank Corporation in 1971. Included in the deal was the Ronaldson & Tippett Foundry, which was renamed the Norvil Foundry.

Following the demise of parent company Norton Villiers Triumph, Villiers Australia Pty. Ltd. Was sold to Australian shareholders in 1978. Manufacture of engines continued until 1979 when the company became the sole Australian distributors of Mitsubishi stationary engines.

=== Spain ===
Autocesorios Harry Walker S.A. had been Villiers representatives in Spain and several Spanish manufacturers were using Villiers. Spain began introducing import restrictions and by 1951 licences to import motorcycle engines were difficult to obtain. The Spanish manufacturers and Autocesorios Harry Walker S.A. looked in to manufacturing Villiers engine under licence in Spain. With the approval of the Spanish Government, Hispano Villiers was set up in August 1951 and a contract signed with Villiers in September.

A 10 ha (25 acres) site was selected in the Sant Andreu district of Barcelona and plans for a new factory drawn up. Construction of the factory started in February 1952, and in March 1953 the factory was completed. Machinery was installed and training given by Villiers, the first engine, a 125 cc single coming off the production line in September. In 1954 a 197 cc engine was introduced and the following year the factory extended to increase production to 10,000 units per year. 250 and 325 cc twin-cylinder engines were added to the range in 1958.

Production of Villiers engines stopped in 1960. The company name was changed to Hispanomotor S.A. and production switched to Lombardini engines.

== Wolverhampton Industrial Engines ==
Former managing director of Villiers, David Sankey, and financial specialist Mark Scutt brought the Villiers engine concern from the receiver with help from the Department of Industry in 1976. The deal included half of the Wolverhampton factory and the machine tools to produce the engines. As the former Villiers marketing company, Villiers Engines Ltd, was still in existence, the new company was named Wolverhampton Industrial Engines. The company name was subsequently changed to Villiers Ltd in March 1980.
