= Tole =

Tole may refer to:

== People ==
- Afrim Tole (born 1970), Albanian football player
- Joseph Tole (1846–1920), New Zealand politician
- Shubha Tole (born 1967), Indian neuroscientist
- Tolé Madna (1898–1992), Indonesian soldier
- Tole Karadzic (born 1939), Montenegrin businessman
- Vasil Tole (born 1963), Albanian ethnomusicologist

== Places ==
- Tolé, Panama
- Tole (woreda), Ethiopia

== Other ==
- Tole painting
- Toleware
