= John Marston (businessman) =

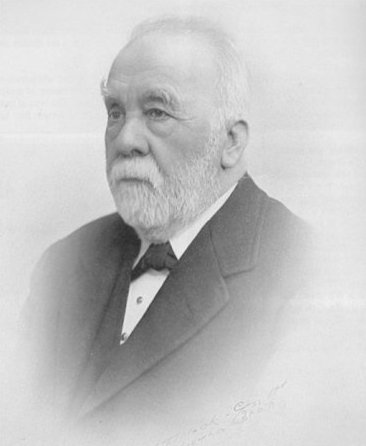
- Born: 6 May 1836; Ludlow, Shropshire, UK
- Died: 1918 (aged 81–82)
- Occupations: Motorcycle and car manufacturer
- Spouse: Ellen Marston

John Marston (1836–1918) was a successful Victorian bicycle, motorcycle and car manufacturer and founder of the Sunbeam company of Wolverhampton. His company was also one of the country's largest manufacturers of japanware and he was responsible for building 'Seagull' outboard engines for marine use and also for starting the Villiers engineering company. He was Mayor of Wolverhampton for two consecutive years and died in 1918 aged 82.

== Early life ==
Marston was born in Ludlow on 6 May 1836, in a landowning family. His father Richard Marston had been a Justice of the Peace and Mayor of Ludlow. John was educated at Ludlow Grammar School, and afterwards at Christ's Hospital, London. In 1851 at age 15, however, John was sent to Wolverhampton to be apprenticed to Richard Perry, Son & Co., tinsmiths and japanners, at the Jeddo Works of Wolverhampton as a japanner (metal lacquerer). Jeddo is an old name for Tokyo.

== Business ==
In 1859, at the age of 23, John Marston's apprenticeship was completed and he bought Daniel Smith Lester's japanning business at Bilston which had amalgamated with Fred Walton & Company and Thurston and Company and established his own business John Marston Limited, producing japanned tin goods. He did so well that when Perry died in 1871 Marston took over the business and merged it with his own.

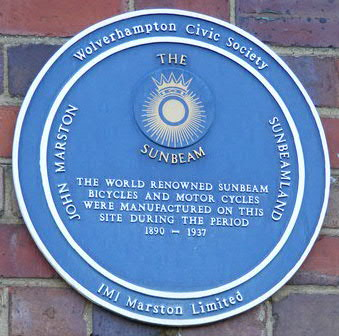
Blue Plaque awarded by Wolverhampton Civic Society attached to the Sunbeamland works

John Marston began making bicycles in 1877 with the trademark Sunbeam suggested by his wife. The factory was renamed Sunbeamland and Marston based his production on high build quality, with enclosure lubricated chains, which until 1936, became the best cycles on the market. The top model was the 'Golden' with alloy wheel-rims, epicyclic two- and three-speed gears and real gold-leaf pin-striping. The 'Royal' was of the same quality but had red lining and simpler equipment. These and other models were made at 'Sunbeamland', Pool Street, Wolverhampton until 1937 and subsequently, to the same designs, by AMC and BSA until 1957.

Between 1899 and 1901 they also experimented with prototype cars, but none were sold. Marston disliked motorcycles, as he saw them as dangerous and never rode one or drove a Sunbeam Motor Car Company car, but remained a keen cyclist, most often using a tricycle.

The first production car named Sunbeam was introduced in 1901, after a partnership with Maxwell Maberly-Smith. The design was unusual with seats on either side of a belt-drive powered by a single-cylinder 3 hp engine. The design was a limited success, with 420 sold at £130 when production ended in 1904. At that point the company started production of a Thomas Pullinger–designed car based on the Berliet mechanicals. They introduced a new model, based on a Peugeot motor they bought for study, in 1906, and sold about ten a week. In 1905, the Sunbeam Motor Car Company Limited was formed separate from the rest of the John Marston business which retained the Sunbeam motorcycles and bicycles.

Many John Marston Sunbeam motorcycle models were produced and the first was a 350 cc in 1912 followed by a range of 500 cc singles and some v-twins. In 1924 a new model numbering system was introduced; Sunbeam Models 1 through 11. Other higher numbered models were produced in later years. The majority had single-cylinder engines developing relatively low power, though winning the TT races often, the last time was the 1929 TT. A hallmark of all Marston Sunbeams was the superb quality and finish in black with gold-leaf pinstriping.

== Later life ==
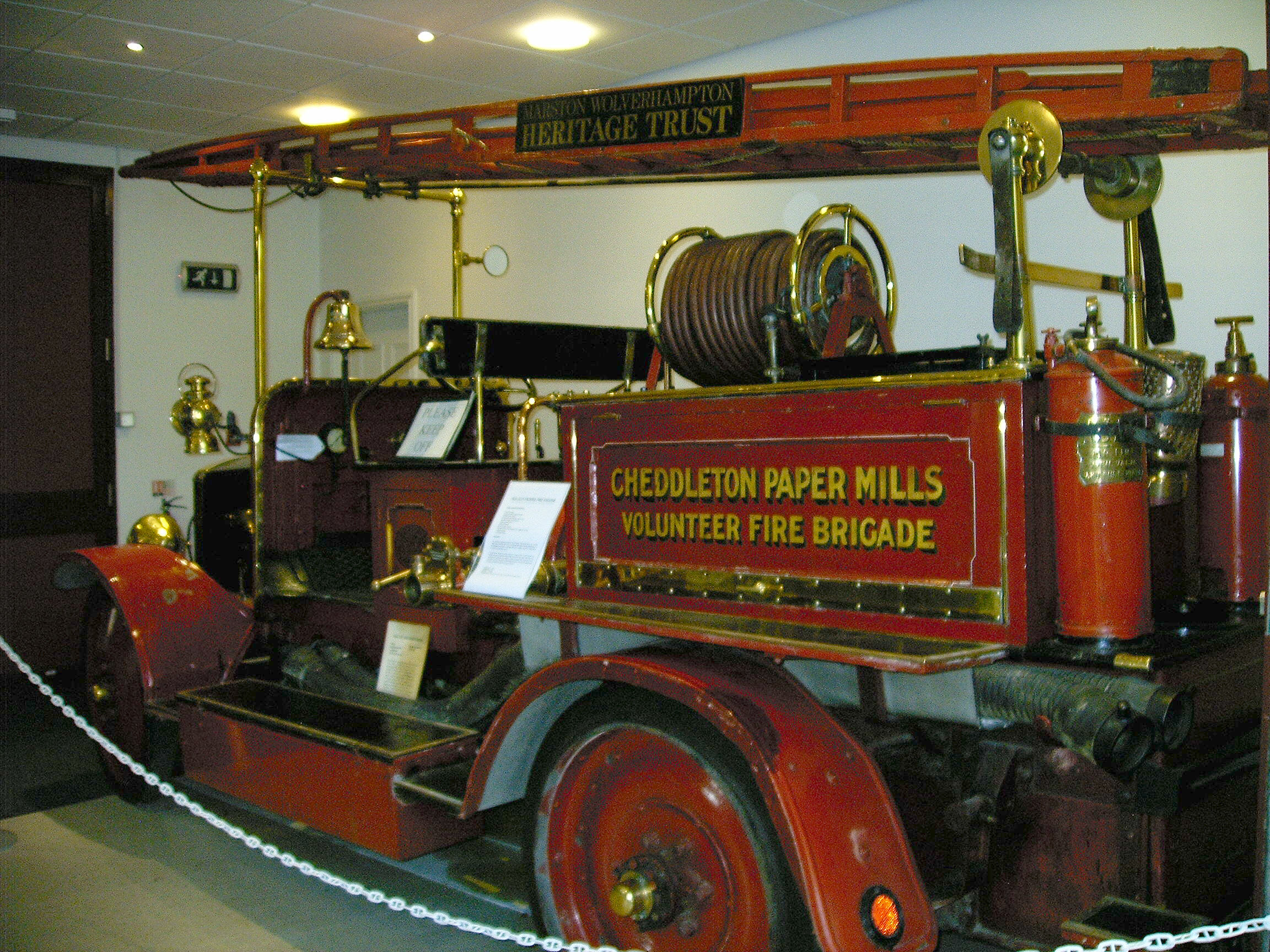
preserved by the Marston Wolverhampton Heritage Trust Fire engine on a Guy Motors chassis Black Country Living Museum

In 1865, Marston married Ellen Edge. She was seven years younger than him and they had ten children, two of whom died young and John and Ellen outlived several of the others. They lived most of their lives at The Oaks, Merridale Road, Wolverhampton. A prominent figure in the local community, John supported education and joined the school board in 1882, becoming chairman from 1886 to 1888. He was also interested in local politics and was elected as a local councillor for St. Paul's ward, in 1885.

In 1889 Alderman Marston became Mayor of Wolverhampton and was re-elected in 1890. In these two years he arranged for sanitation to be improved and instigated water and sewerage works that are in use to this day. He also oversaw the building of a new power station to supply electricity for electric lighting and the approval of the Local Government Act 1888 that made Wolverhampton a county borough.

Marston retired from business on 6 May 1916 and died in 1918 aged 82.

== See also ==
- John Marston Ltd
- Sunbeam Cycles
- Sunbeam Motor Car Company

Political offices
Preceded by Frederic Edward Manby	Mayor of Wolverhampton; 1889–1891	Succeeded by James Saunders
