= Society of Decorative Painters =

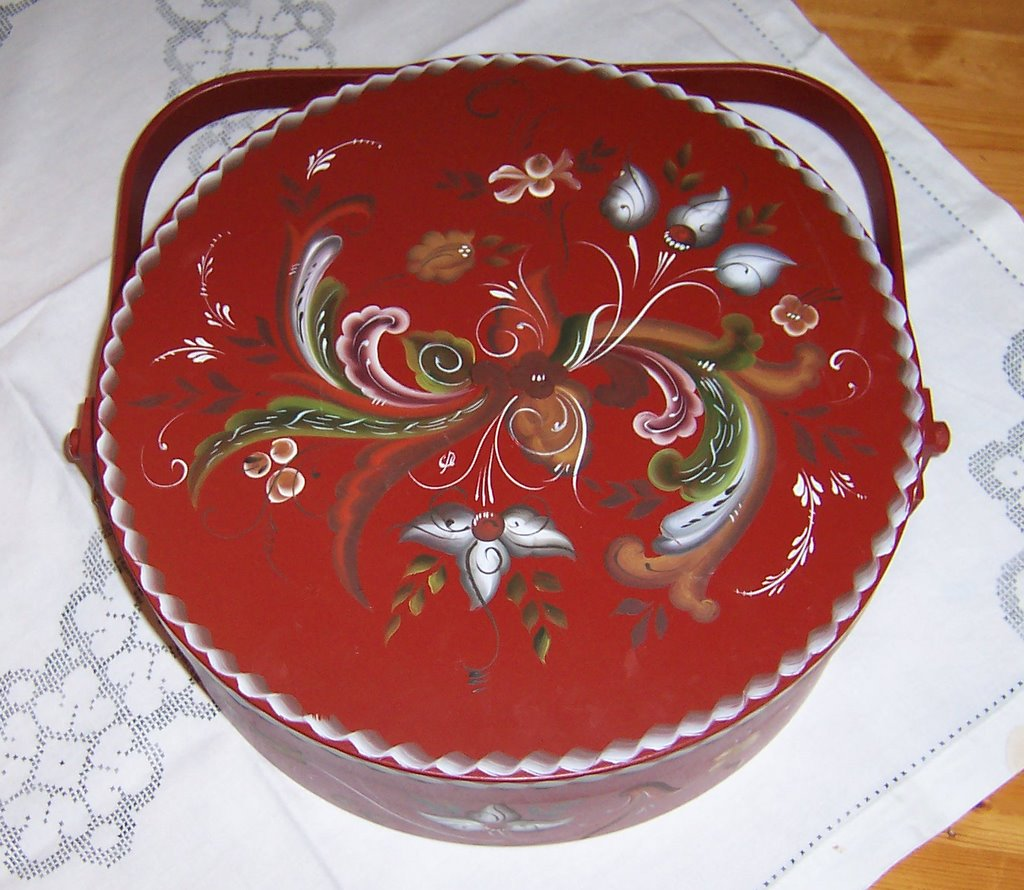
Rosemaling a Norwegian form of decorative arts or tole painting

The Society of Decorative Painters (SDP) was formed in 1972 to promote interest in decorative painting. Decorative painting includes all styles of painting including Tole painting or Rosemaling. The organization is a "not-for-profit" organization but it does not have tax exempt status.

In 2008, the Society was responsible for finding an artist to paint Christmas ornaments for use in the White House. In 2009, SDP members helped produce holiday decorations for use in the Renwick Gallery at the Smithsonian American Art Museum. After 50 years, the Society disbanded in December 2022.

== Artist certification ==
The Society of Decorative Painters offers a certification program for either Certified Decorative Artists (CDA) or Master Decorative Artists (MDA). Artists can be certified in still life, floral or stroke categories. Once a year Master Decorative Artists review anonymous portfolios before selecting an artist for either CDA or MDA certification. The process requires an application, entry fee, and one project submitted for the portfolio.

== Code of ethics ==
The society has a code of ethics members agree to follow. The ethics include following copyright laws, creating a friendly atmosphere, cooperation between individuals, groups and the like; honesty, fairness and adhering to the organization's code of ethics.

== SDP Chapters (regional/local affiliates) ==
SDP Chapters promote creativity at the local level by organizing classes, seminars, 'paint-ins', and community service activities.
