= Ruby Cycle Co Ltd =

British motorcycle manufacturer

- Company type: Private
- Industry: Motorcycle
- Founded: 1909
- Defunct: 1932
- Headquarters: Manchester, United Kingdom
- Products: Motorcycles

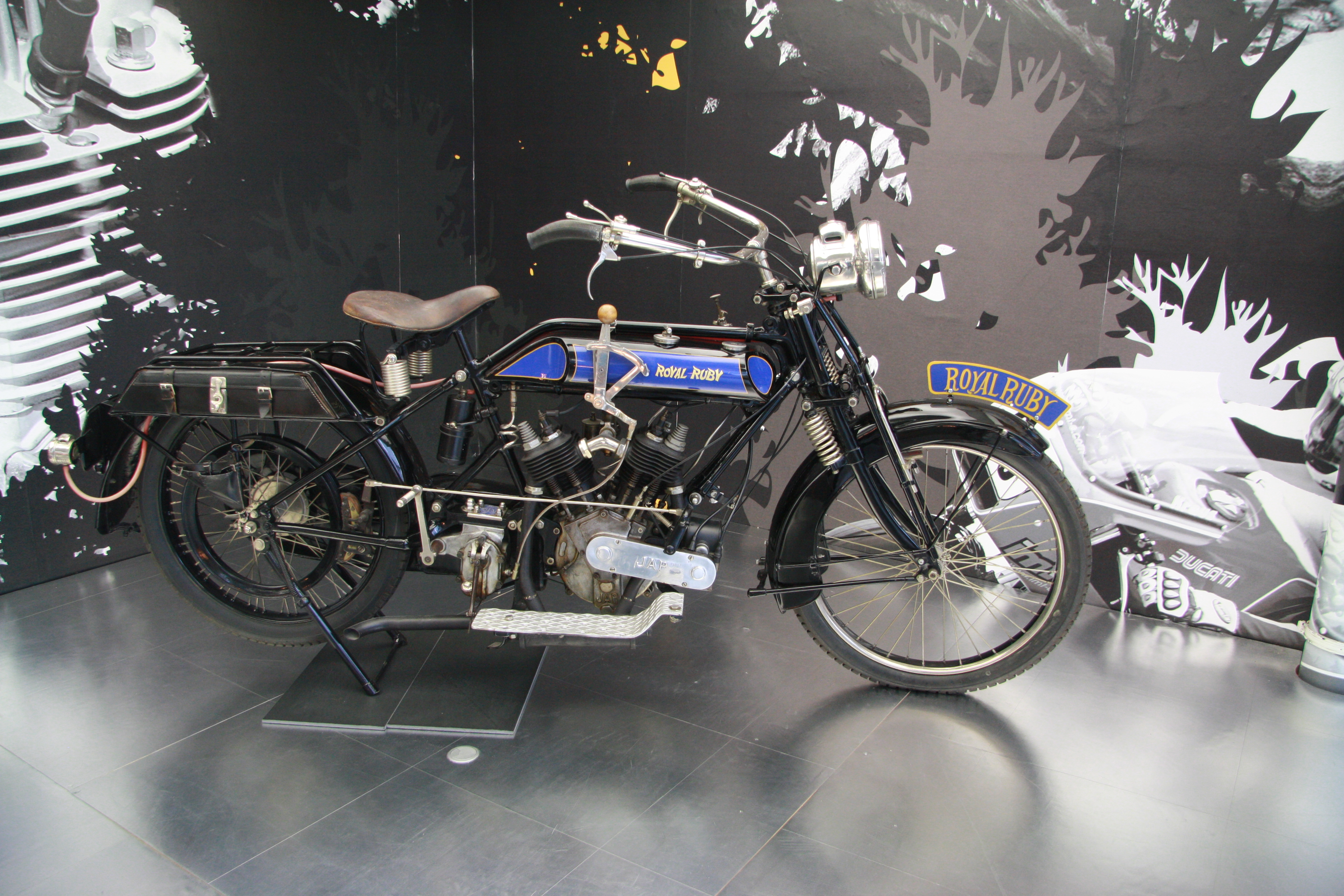
Royal Ruby 8 Twin at exhibition in Kaiser-Franz-Josefs-Höhe.

The Ruby Cycle Co Ltd. was a British motorcycle manufacturer based in Ancoats Manchester. Founded in 1909 the factory produced a range of motorcycles under the Royal Ruby brand until 1932.

== History ==
The Ruby Cycle Co. were originally bicycle makers based in Cannel Street, Ancoats surrounded by the Manchester cotton mills and like many bicycle makers of the time turned to producing by motorcycles from 1909. The Royal Ruby motorcycles were expensive as all the cycle parts were manufactured by the company in Manchester, but engines were brought in from JAP and Villiers.

The range included 250cc 2 strokes and 4 strokes as well an unusual 'Ladies Model' with a specially lowered frame. Top of the range was a 976cc side valve V-twin. During the first world war production at the factory turned to munitions and components to support the war effort, but in 1916 a large export order for the V-twin was commissioned by the Imperial Russian Army. The motorcycles were produced but delivery of the order was disrupted by the outbreak of the Russian Revolution in 1919. Although a few motorcycles were delivered to Russia, it is not clear whether all payments were forthcoming. After the war ended the British motorcycle market was saturated with ex military machines, but munitions work had supported the company and, with a re-arranged board, a new factory was built on Moss Lane, Altrincham where production of motorcycles restarted in 1921, together with their own Ruby leaf sprung forks and rear suspension using the same method, but the results were very expensive, sales were extremely slow and the company went bust completely in 1922. The name was sold to Albert Horrocks of Bolton in 1927. Horrocks developed a new saddle-tank motorcycle in 1928 with Villiers and JAP engines and Albion and Sturmey-Archer gearboxes. Royal Ruby motorcycle production ended around 1931 but one-off motorcycles may have been assembled from spare parts up to 1933.

=== Cyclecars ===
As well as motor cycles the company also made cyclecars at two separate times. There was a major boom in cyclecar production before World War I and between 1913 and 1914 one was made under the Royal Ruby name with 10hp V twin JAP engine, two speed gearbox and either shaft or belt drive to the rear wheels. Only a few are thought to have been made.

Another Royal Ruby car, this time a three wheeler was announced in 1927 with single cylinder JAP engine but only a prototype was apparently made designed by Maurice Edwards. A modified version appeared in 1928 called the MEB (Maurice Edwards Bolton) made by commercial vehicle bodybuilders Bromilow and Edwards in Bolton. A tuned version had some success at Brooklands and Montlhery driven by Gwenda Stewart and Douglas Hawkes between 1930 and 1932.

== See also ==
- List of car manufacturers of the United Kingdom
