= Japanning =

Type of European lacquerwork imitating Japanese urushi

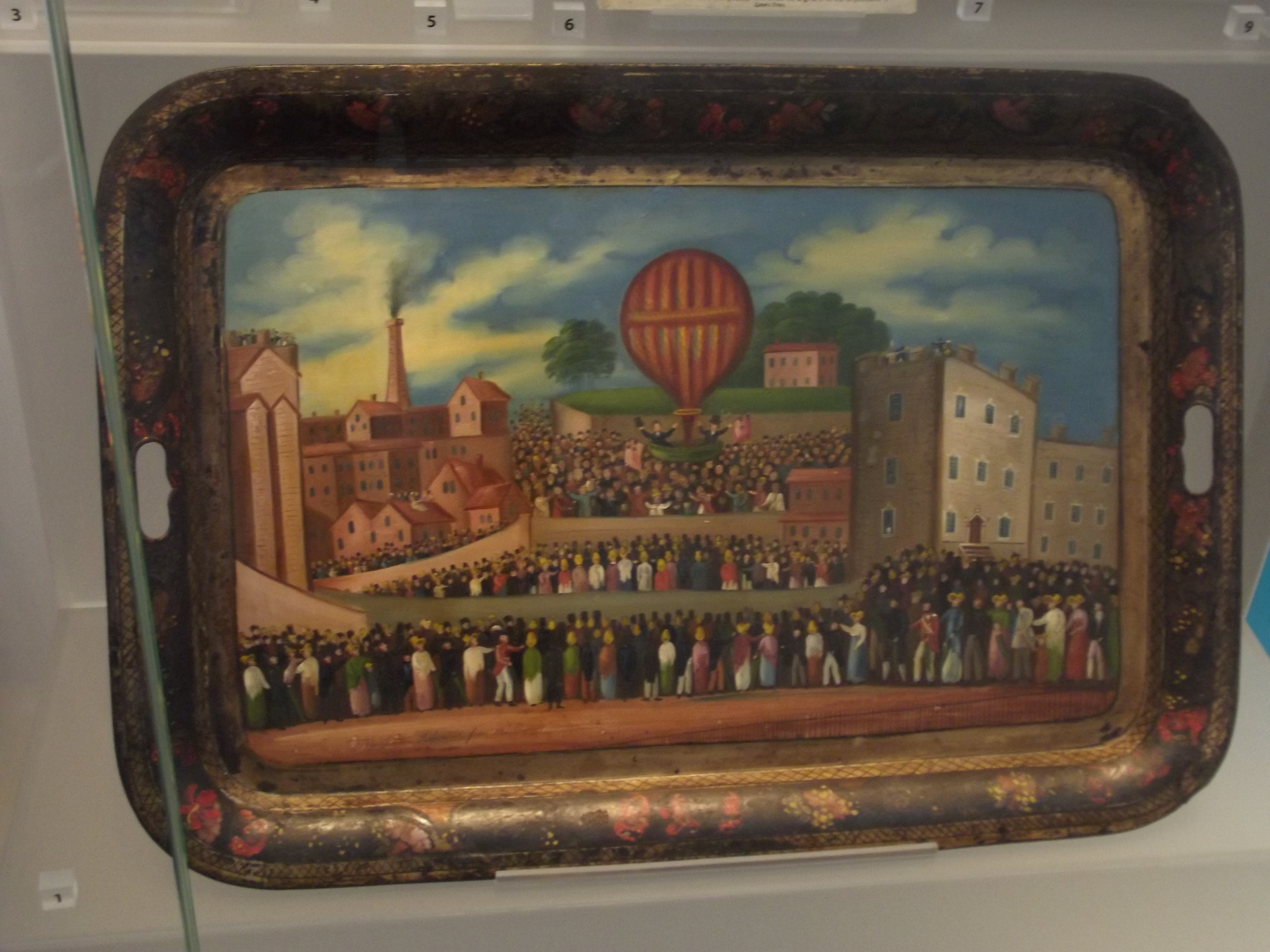
A Georgian japanned tin tea tray—severely worn—black lacquer and gilt made in Birmingham, UK

Japanning is a type of finish that originated as a European imitation of East Asian lacquerwork. It was first used on furniture, but was later much used on small items in metal. The word originated in the 17th century. American work, except in the carriage and early automobile industries, is more often called toleware.

It is distinct from true East Asian lacquer, which is made by coating objects with a preparation based on the dried sap of the Toxicodendron vernicifluum tree, which was not available in Europe.

Japanning is most often a heavy black lacquer, almost like enamel paint. Black is common, and japanning is often synonymous with black japanning. The European technique uses varnishes that have a resin base, similar to shellac, applied in heat-dried layers which are then polished, to give a smooth glossy finish. It can also come in reds, greens and blues.

Originating in India, China and Japan as a decorative coating for pottery, authentic East Asian lacquered ware made its way into Europe by the 17th century. In the late 17th century, high European demand (along with rumors that East Asian manufacturers reserved their higher-quality work for their domestic markets) led to the production of imitation pieces starting in Italy. Its traditional form used gold designs and pictorials to contrast with the black base colour.

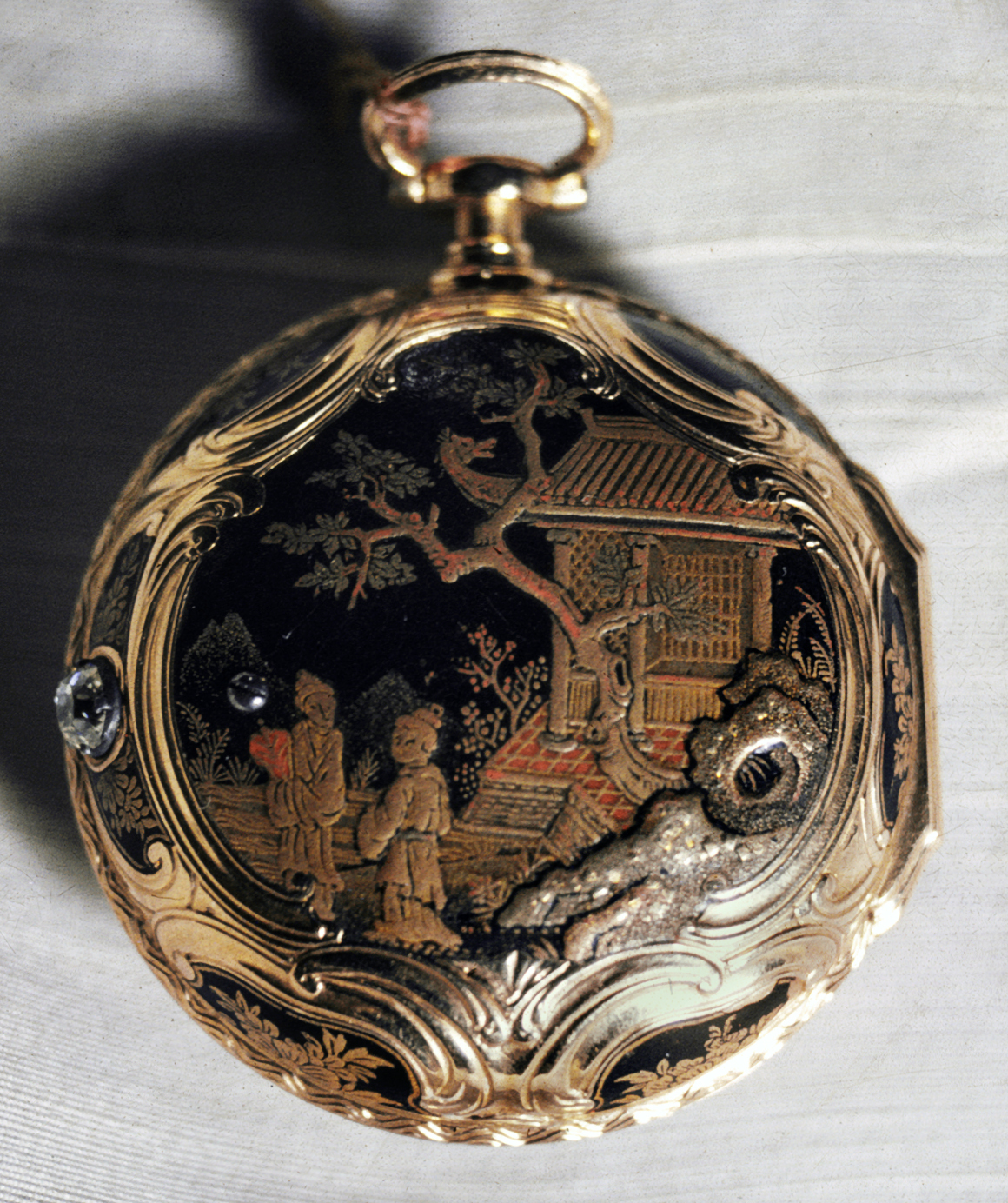
A japanned pocket watch from the 18th century

== Development in Europe ==
As the demand for japanned goods grew, the Italian technique for imitating Asian lacquerwork also spread. The art of japanning developed in seventeenth-century Britain, France, Italy, and the Low Countries. The technique was described in design and pattern manuals such as Stalker and Parker's Treatise of Japanning and Varnishing, published in Oxford in 1688. Colonial Boston was a major center of the japanning trade in America, where at least a dozen cabinetmakers included it among their specialties. In England, decoupage, the art of applying paper cutouts to other items, became very popular, especially the botanical-inspired works of Mary Delany.

A large amount of early amateur japanning can be attributed to the rise of the artform as a suitable pastime for young ladies between the late 17th and 18th century. Molly Verney is noted as one of these early adopters of the craft which was subsequently taught in London, but a number of pattern books such as Art's Master-piece. OR, A Companion for the Ingenious of either Sex (1697), The Art of Japanning: Varnishing, Pollishing, and Gilding ... Published at the Request of Several Ladies of Distinction by Mrs. Artlove (1730), The Lady's Delight, or Accomplished Female Instructor (1741), Study and Practise the Noble and Commendable Art of Drawing, Colouring and Japanning ... with Plain and Easy Rules for the Ladies Japanning (1751), The Ladies Amusement or, Whole Art of Japanning Made Easy (1758, 1762 and 1771), and The Young Ladies School of Arts by Hannah Robertson (1766) were all aimed at a female audience, and some of which were also written by female authors.

Certainly by 1710, "japanning" was regarded by many including Alexander Pope as a feminine pastime. These mock lacquerware techniques were often suggested to be applied to textiles, and by the 18th century are found on cabinets, tea-trays, powderboxes, drawers, and large flat English household furniture in the manors and houses of the landed gentry.

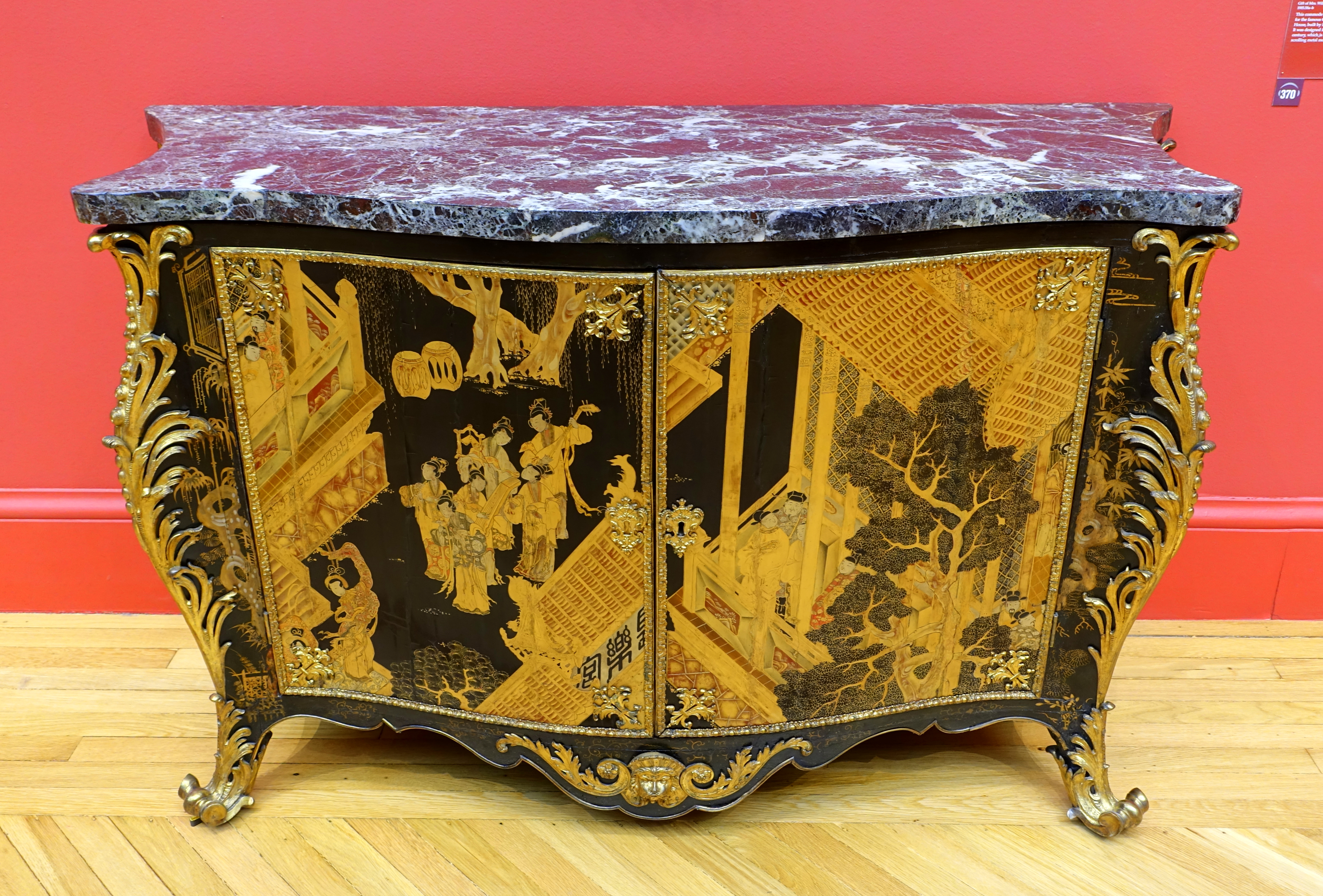
A Walpole commode from Strawberry Hill House

Drawing on the grotesque forms derived from travellers accounts and artwork from the Indies these conflated forms went so far from the source material, they can said to be an early form of Japonaiserie in the UK. Popular motifs included landscapes containing "woods, cottages, rivers, trees, hills, sun, moon [&] stars". Other popular adopters included the wife of Robert Walpole, Lady Catherine Walpole in 1732. One of her 'japanned cabinets' was bought and displayed in the Blue bedroom by Horace Walpole in his Strawberry Hill House.

The popularity of japanning continued to be seen as a womanly pursuit until 1760, by which point it began to become a commercial trade in the UK. Today, japanning exists primarily as a conservation craft – it is extremely rare to make it for new items so it is taught from a conservation/restoration approach for example as part of the City & Guilds three-year Conservation course and Painter Stainers Decorative Surface Fellowship.

=== Wolverhampton and Bilston ===
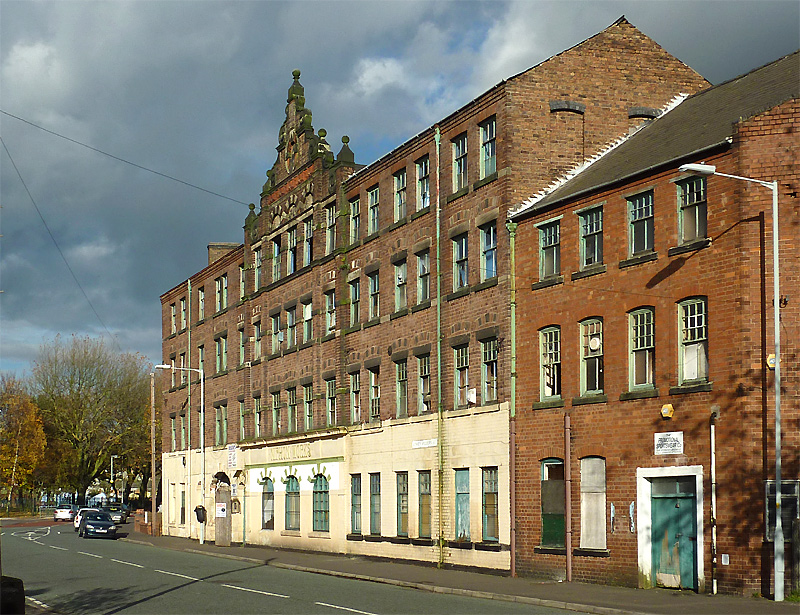
Robert Stroud & Co's Niphon (Japan) Works, c. 1865. Lower Villiers Street, Blakenhall Wolverhampton

Wolverhampton and Bilston were important centres for the manufacture of japanned ware. Trade directories for 1818 list 20 firms of japanners in Wolverhampton and 15 in Bilston. According to Samuel Timmins' book Birmingham and the Midland Hardware District, published in 1866, there were 2,000 people employed in the japanning and tin-plate industries in Wolverhampton and Bilston at the time.

Japanning firms ranged in size from small family workshops, which often adjoined the proprietor's home, to a few large factories employing over 250 people. In the larger workshops, the production of tin plate and papier-mâché articles and the japanning process all took place under one roof, while small workshops tended to carry out only one or two of the trades, usually tin-plate working and japanning.

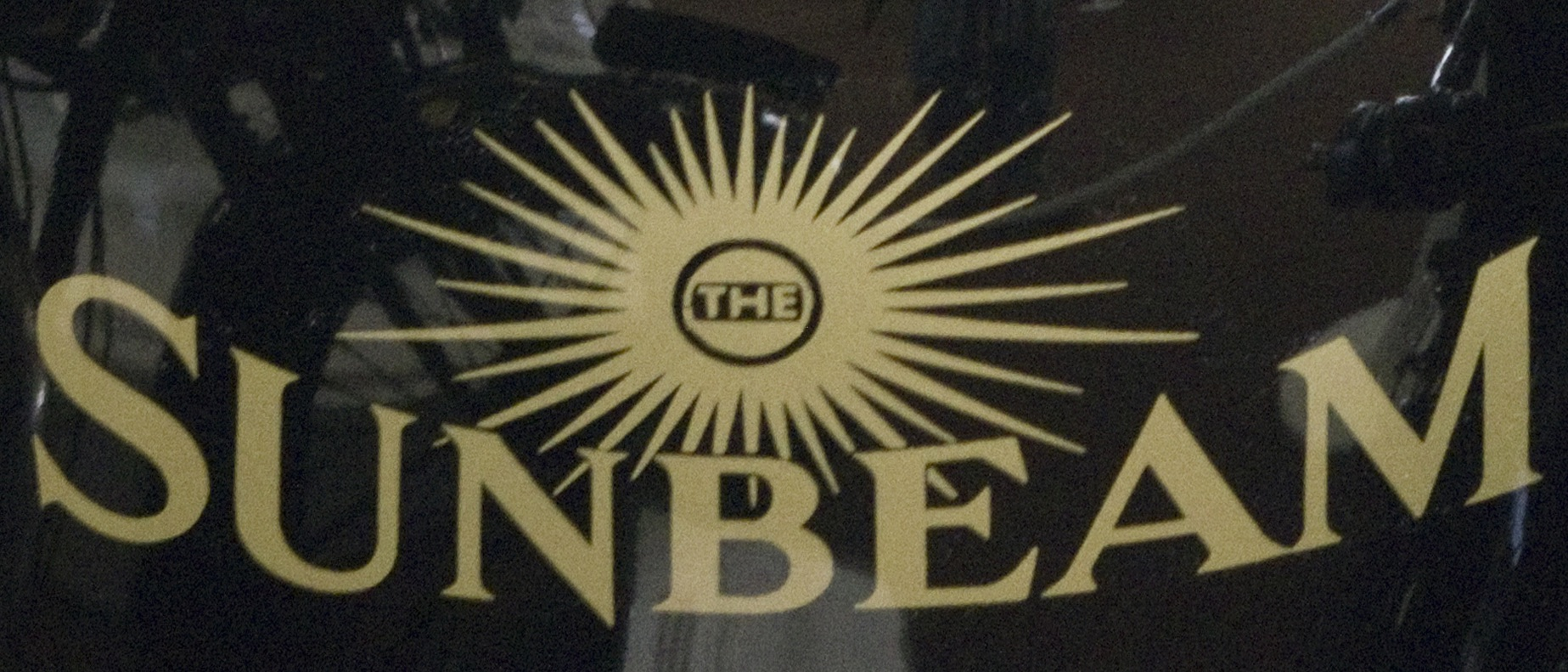

At the height of its popularity, richly decorated japanned ware was to be seen in every middle-class home, but from the mid-19th century, this began to change. By the 1880s, the japanning and tin-plate industries were in decline. This was due partly to changes in fashion and taste and partly due to the development of electroplating. In response, makers of japanned ware began to focus on more utilitarian items, including japanned cash boxes.

Many turned to other trades, including enamelling, electroplating and the manufacture of copper and brass coal scuttles, fire screens and kettles. By the 1920s, the West Midlands' decorative japanned ware industry had largely died out. Many firms began to supply japanned metal to the newly established bicycle and motor vehicle industries, and some even made their own bicycles.

The most successful of these was John Marston, whose japanning factory began making bicycles in 1887. The bicycle manufacturing part of the business quickly became more successful than the production of decorative japanned ware. Marston's wife thought the gilt on the black japanned bicycles looked like sunbeams and the bicycles were branded Sunbeam and their factory was named Sunbeamland.

== Japanned metal ==
Ironware was japanned black for decorative reasons. It was also used to render it rustproof, suitable for carrying water. A significant industry developed at Pontypool and Usk in South Wales, shortly before tinplate began to be made in the area. Japanned ware was made at Bilston, England, by 1719 and later elsewhere in the area.

== Applications ==
The technique was also developed to protect metal objects such as sewing machines, hand planes, builders' hardware, and in North America, electricity meters made before the mid-1930s. Later, it was used as an insulating film on transformer laminations.

Japanned sheets were also used as the dark substrate for the tintype photographic process.

== See also ==
- Japan black
- Vernis Martin
- Raden
- Decoupage
