= British Seagull =

British manufacturer

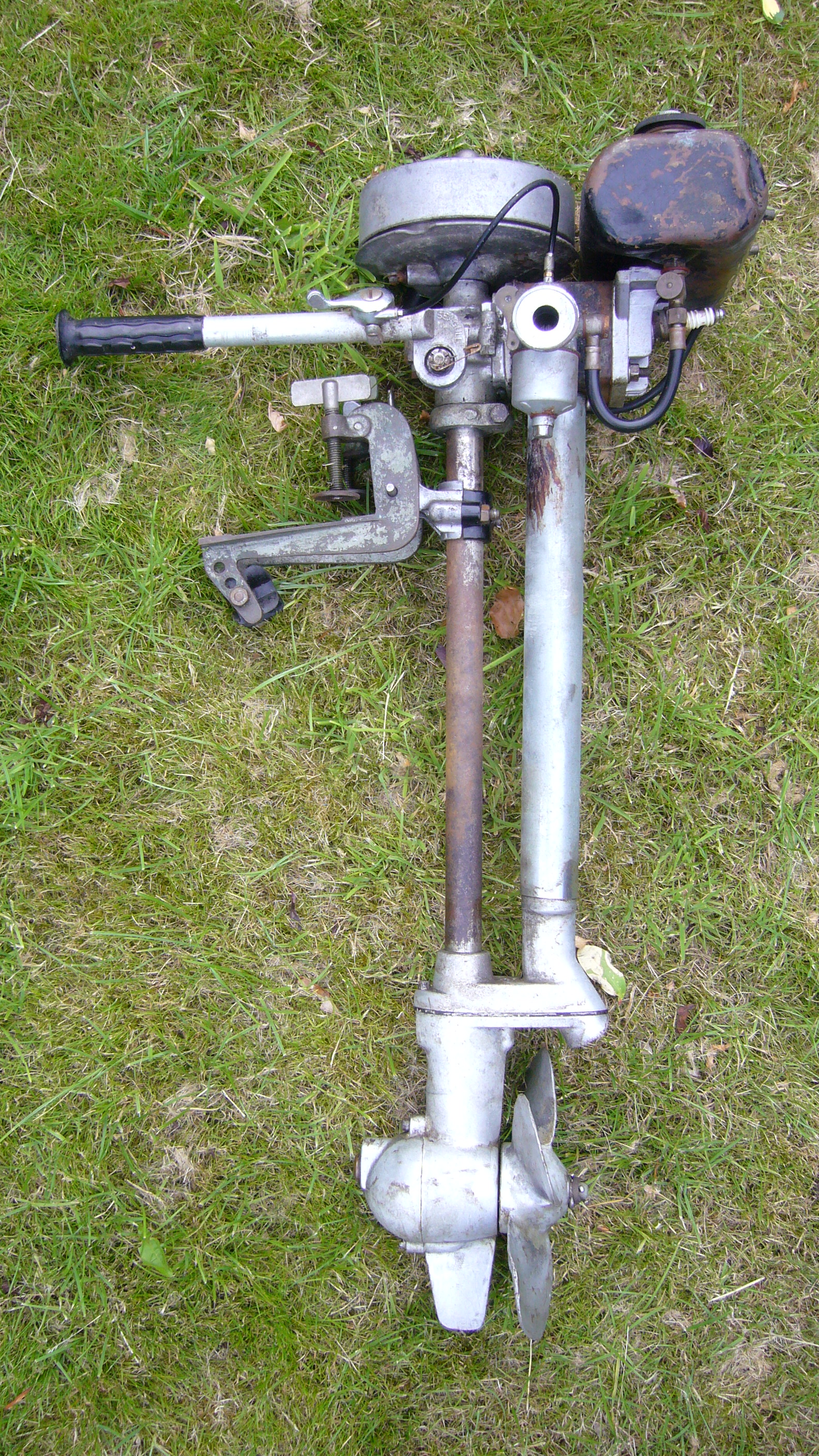
Lateral view of a Forty series British Seagull. The serial number dates it to 1954/1955

British Seagull is a British manufacturer of simple and rugged two-stroke marine outboard motors, produced from the late 1930s until the mid-1990s. Originally based in Wolverhampton, the company moved to Poole, Dorset, a centre for boating and yachting. Seagull engines are utilitarian outboards with a relatively slow-turning prop. They are ideal for use in dinghies, tenders and small yachts, but are not well suited for high-speed craft.

British Seagull's "Classic" range of engines became renowned for their reliability and near-indestructability. Production continued unchanged for many decades with barely any revisions or updates. Such was the quality of the metals used, that many are still operational many decades later. Ultimately, the Seagull product could not match more modern outboards such as Yamaha, Evinrude and Tohatsu, which were more efficient (with fewer emissions) and more user-friendly. British Seagull ceased production of complete engines in 1996 but still produces spare parts for existing engines.

== History ==
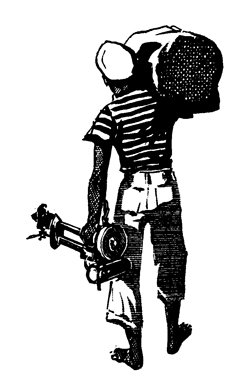
Vintage image used by British Seagull

British Seagull outboards were first sold under the name Marston Seagull. They were developed at John Marston Ltd's "Sunbeamland" factory in Wolverhampton by development engineers John Way-Hope and Bill Pinninger. This pair later bought the manufacturing rights in 1937 and marketed outboards as Bristol Seagull, later moving to Poole and settling for the name British Seagull.

At first, the company's main competitor was the British Anzani. During WWII both British Seagull and British Anzani outboards were used by the Royal Engineers and Royal Navy to propel folding boats and inflatables.

Originally marketed as "The Best Outboard in the World", the slogan later became more modest as "The Best Outboard Motor for the World".

== The Classic British Seagull design ==
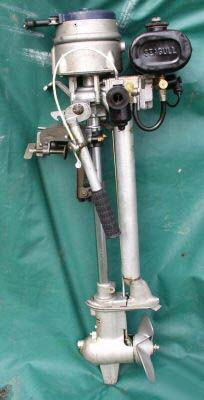
Forty Plus model British Seagull with recoil starter

There are several different British Seagull outboard motor models, most with a single cylinder water-cooled two-stroke engine. Atop the unshrouded engine there is a magneto, and on its port side a simple carburetter with no air filter. (Even a rudimentary rubber "storm cowl" was an optional extra, and induction noise when running was pronounced). Classic Seagulls have a small brass fuel tank bolted to the cylinder head which gravity-feeds fuel to the carburetter via a clear plastic tube that served to capture dirt particles in the U-bend. A simple plastic filter on the banjo union to the carb gave secondary filtering, but it was still not unusual for the carb jets to become blocked. Starting was effected with a hand-wound pull-rope, although recoil starting became an option in due course. Connecting the motor to the gearbox and propeller were two downtubes, the forward one containing the drive shaft, and the aft tube serving as the exhaust-cum-silencer (which vented underwater). This arrangement meant that the engine could not be rotated 360 degrees to give reverse thrust, as can more modern small outboards. The engines are very rugged, if somewhat utilitarian. They used very high quality materials, and could last for years even in harsh marine environments.

== Fuel/oil mix ==
Originally using a very oil-rich mixture of 8:1, from 1942 models specified a 10:1 mix which remained until 1979, when a 25:1 mix was ordained. Thereafter, a 50:1 mix was tried for the introduction of the models 125 and 170, but these engines with such a lean mix proved unreliable, and British Seagull returned to the 25:1 ratio. This unusually high percentage of oil was necessary due to the way the crankshaft bushings worked. Early engines used short bushings, and later ones used longer bushings, hence the changes in oil requirement. The longer bushings were, in fact, used from 1967 onwards, and the engines from 1967 to 1979 can be used on the 25:1 mix by making carburettor adjustments.

== Models ==
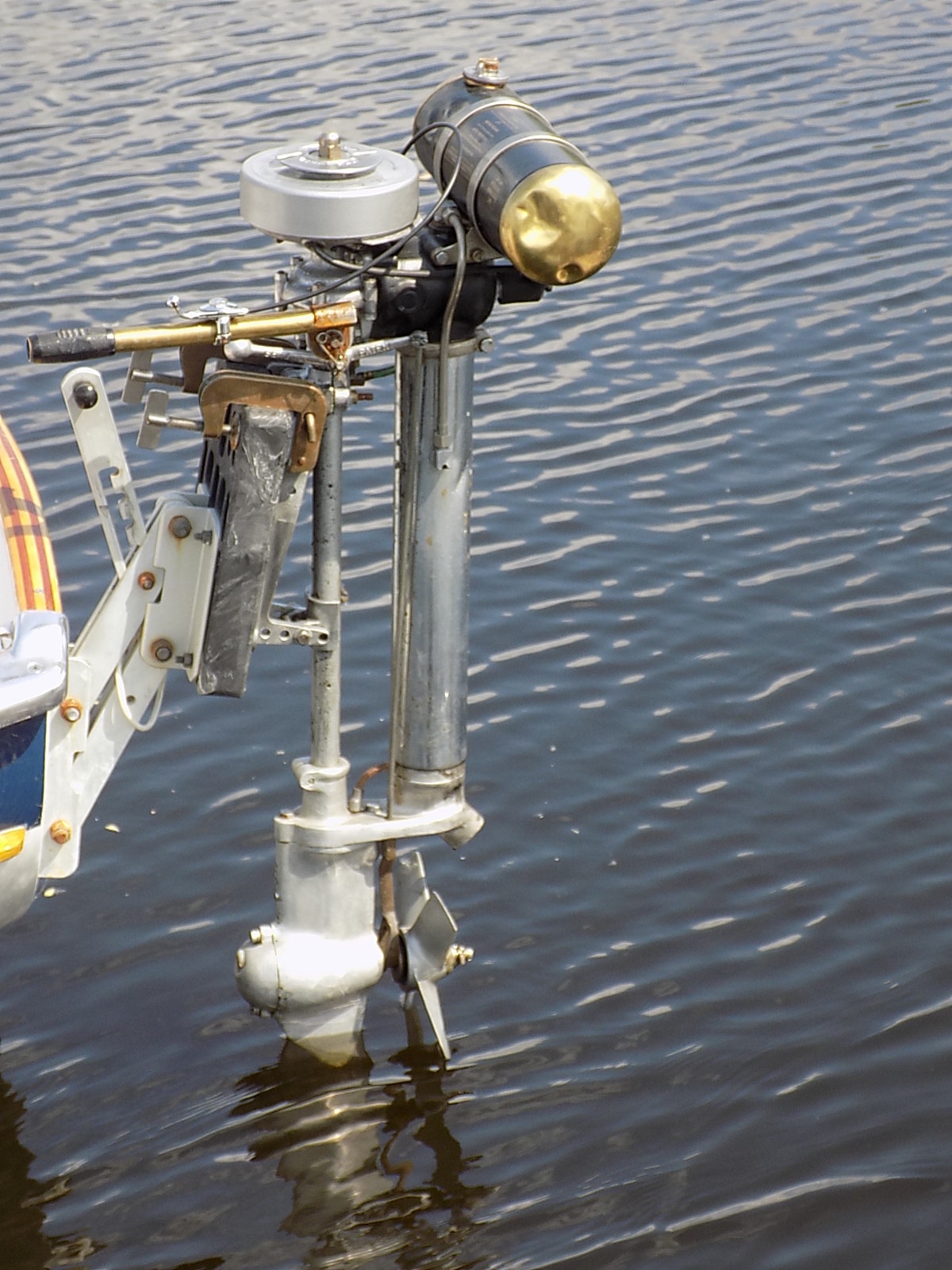
British Seagull "Century" outboard motor

The model range for which Seagull is most famous is the "Classic" range. These "square block models" comprised the 64 cc Featherweight (aka Forty Minus) and Forty Plus, and the 102 cc Century and Century Plus. The Forty Minus and Plus used identical power units, but the Plus had a larger gearbox and propeller. The Century and Century Plus used even larger gearboxes and propellers. The Century models were available either as short-shaft or long shaft. The Silver Century Plus model could propel a displacement hull of up to 26 feet in length.

Classic model engines were produced from the late 1950s until the mid-1990s, and many examples are still in everyday use. Production of complete engines stopped in 1996, where John Freeman (Sales) Ltd, trading as Sheridan Marine, bought the company and rights to the brand in 1999, and they continue to manufacture and supply spare parts. An early engine of the company was the Model 102, developed from the Marston models of the 1930s. The Model 102 engines are fairly large and featured an integral engine cylinder block and head, with a water-injected exhaust. Some Model 102 outboards had a 13-inch-diameter (330 mm) propeller, gaining the moniker of "The Barge Pusher".

In the early 1980s the factory produced a new series of British Seagull outboards, the QB series. The power units were developed by Queen's University, Belfast (hence QB) whose Mechanical Engineering Department specialised in modernising two-stroke design. Painted black and sometimes known as the Irish Seagull, they featured quieter, more efficient engines, with a water-cooled exhaust and modified cylinder porting.

In the late 1980s British Seagull introduced two further models to their range, the Model 170 and the Model 125. Fitted with a cowling to enclose the engine, they featured upgraded carburettors and cylinder blocks. Both new models suffered from poorly designed crankshaft bushings, resulting in warranty claims against the company. Until that time the "Best Outboard Motor for the World" (as the marketing slogan ran) had an envious reputation for reliability, but these new models were never popular and they dented the company's image.

Towards the end of production a new model called the "5R" was introduced. The design of this engine was quite different from earlier models, using a conventional gearbox from a Yamaha 4HP outboard attached via an adaptor plate to a QB engine. These models were painted blue, the very last examples (known as "gold tops") having propellers and recoil starters that were gold-painted.
