= Sunbeam Cycles =

British bicycle and motorcycle manufacturer

John Marston Limited
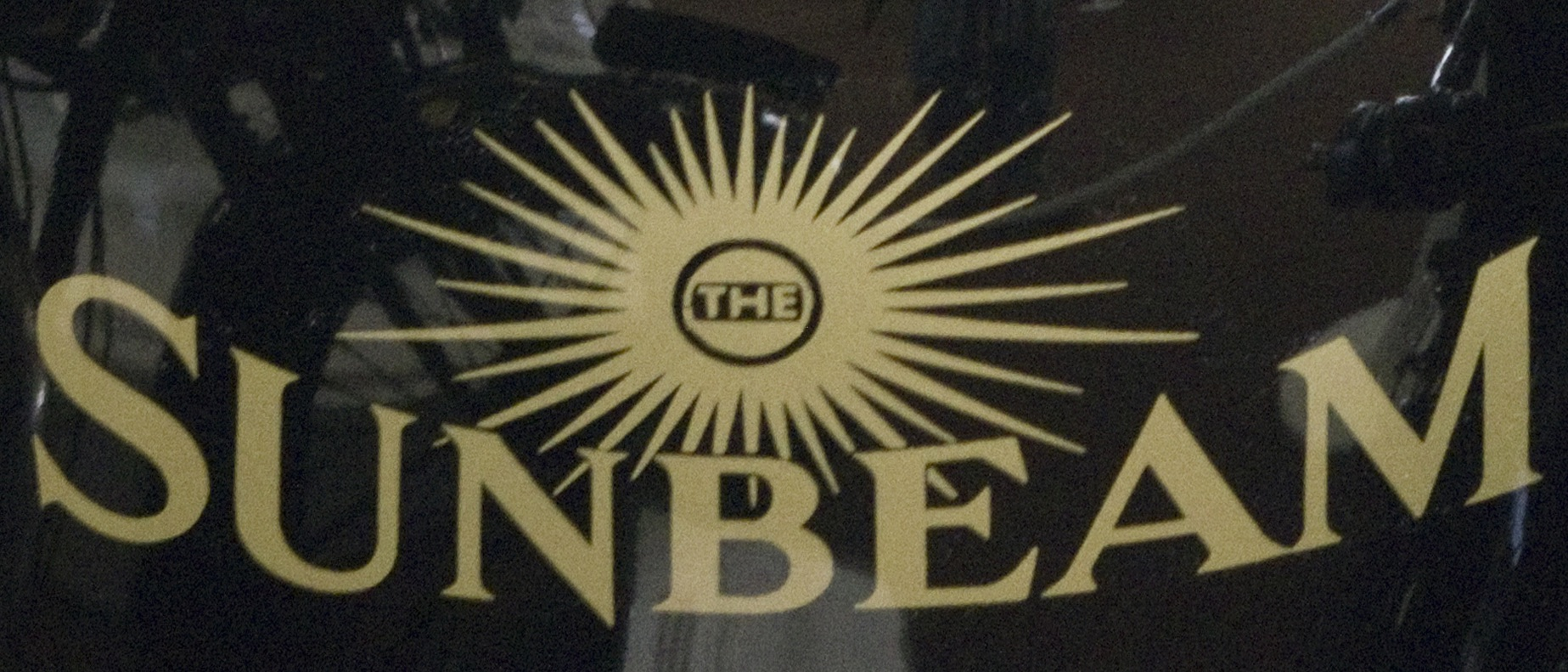
- Trade name: Sunbeam
- Company type: Private company
- Industry: Bicycle and motorcycle
- Founded: 1887; 139 years ago in Wolverhampton, Staffordshire, England
- Founder: John Marston
- Fate: defunct
- Headquarters: Wolverhampton, England
- Products: Bicycles and motorcycles
- Owner: John Marston

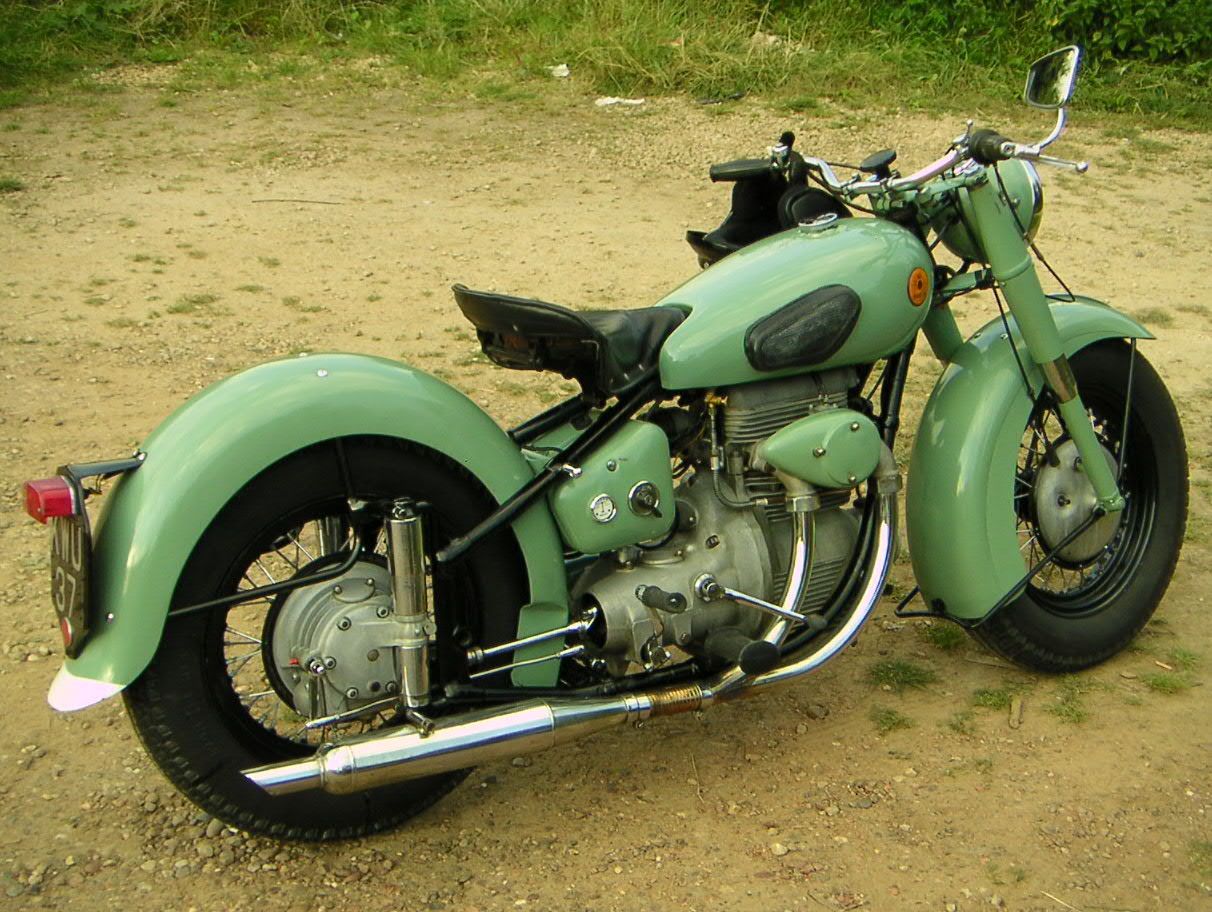
Mist Green S7 showing shaft-driven rear wheel and balloon tyres captured on highway, central England in 2007

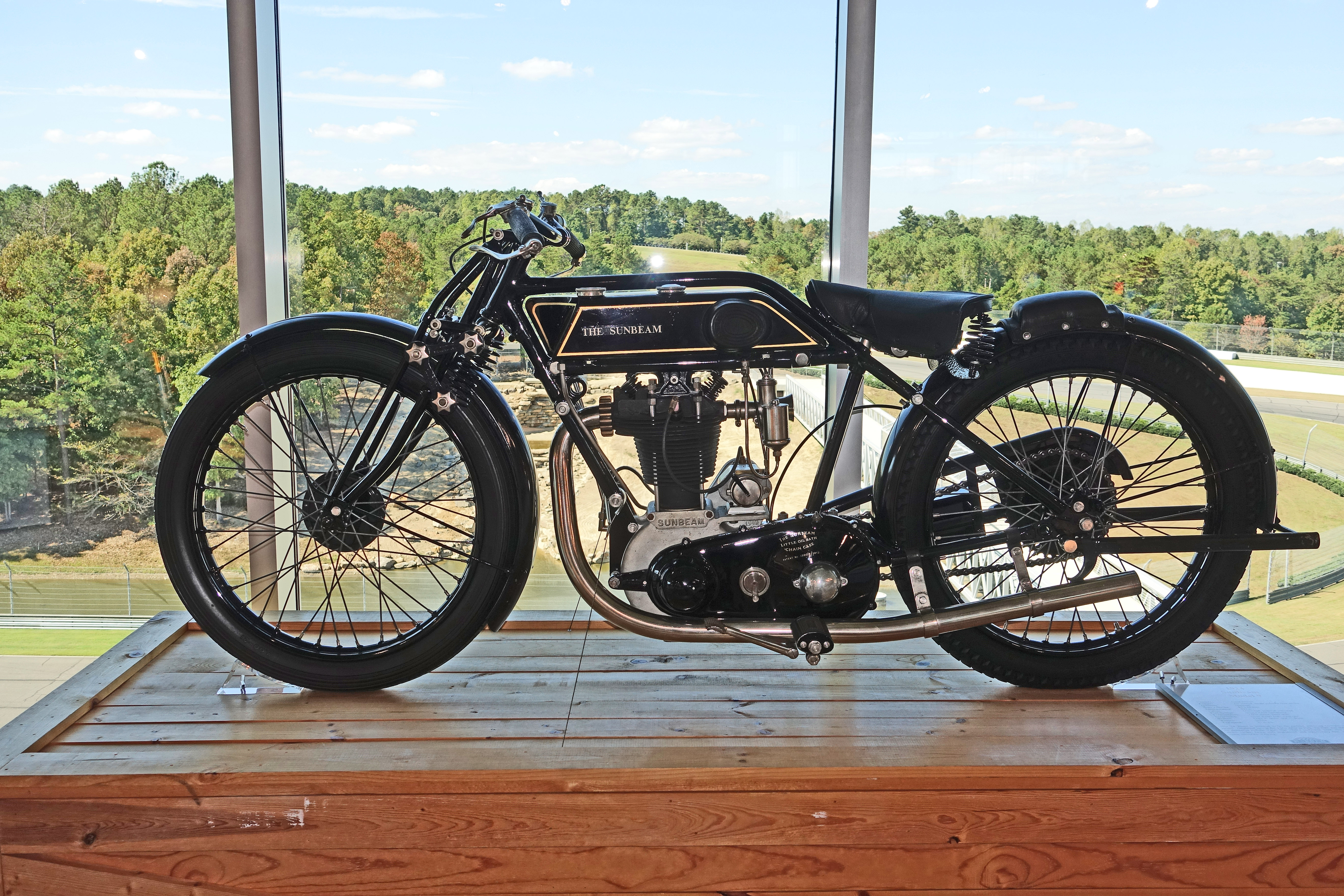
1924 Sunbeam Model 9 on display at the Barber Vintage Motorsports Museum, Birmingham, Alabama. The single-cylinder motorcycle had a displacement of 499cc, weighed 345 pounds, and had a top speed of 75 mph.

Sunbeam Cycles made by John Marston Limited of Wolverhampton was a British brand of bicycles and, from 1912 to 1956, motorcycles.

On John Marston's death after the First World War it was bought by Nobel Industries, Nobel became ICI. Associated Motor Cycles bought it in 1937; then, BSA bought Sunbeam in 1943. Sunbeam Cycles is most famous for its S7 balloon-tyred shaft-drive motorcycle with an overhead valve in-line twin engine.

== History ==
Sunbeam Cycles was founded by John Marston, who was born in Ludlow, Shropshire, UK in 1836 of a minor landowning family. In 1851, aged 15, he was sent to Wolverhampton to be apprenticed to Edward Perry as a japanware manufacturer. At the age of 23 he left and set up his own japanning business making any and every sort of domestic article. He did so well that when Perry died in 1871 Marston bought Perry's business and amalgamated it with his own.

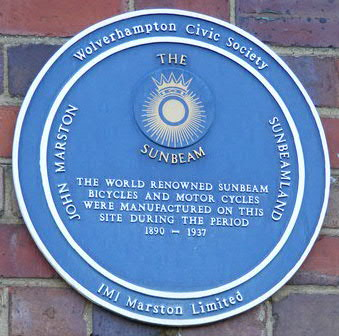
Blue Plaque awarded by Wolverhampton Civic Society attached to the Sunbeamland works

In 1887 Marston began making bicycles and, on the suggestion of his wife Ellen, he adopted the trademark brand Sunbeam; their Paul Street works were named Sunbeamland. John Marston was a perfectionist, and this was reflected in the high build-quality of the Sunbeam bicycle, which had an enclosure around the drive chain in which an oil bath kept the chain lubricated and clean. Sunbeam bicycles were made until 1936.

=== Engines ===
From 1903 John Marston Limited had made some early experiments in adding engines to bicycles but they were unsuccessful; a man was killed. John Marston's aversion to motorcycles did not encourage further development. Following experimental products made in the late 1890s, cars were built from 1902. A quite separate organisation located a mile away in Blakenhall, named Sunbeam Motor Car Company Limited, was founded in 1905.

However, suffering from a slump which hit car making, Marston was pushed into making motorcycles from 1912 onwards (at the age of 76), for which there was a large and increasing market. Following in the tradition of their bicycles, the motorcycles were of high-quality, usually with a single cylinder, and known as the Gentleman's Machine. Sunbeam motorcycles performed well in the early days of the famous TT (Tourist Trophy) races in the Isle of Man.

Another Marston company product line started in 1931, with marine outboard engines first marketed as Marston Seagull, later known as British Seagull.

=== Ownership ===
After the First World War John Marston Limited was sold to a consortium. In 1919, the consortium became part of Nobel Industries Limited. In 1927 Nobel Industries amalgamated with Brunner Mond Ltd. to form Imperial Chemical Industries (ICI). In this huge organization motorcycles were a small part.

The BSA Sunbeam badge

In 1937 the Sunbeam motorcycle trademark was sold to Associated Motor Cycles Ltd (AMC) which continued to make Sunbeam bicycles and motorcycles until 1939. AMC's core business was the manufacture of Matchless and AJS motorcycles. Some years after it sold Sunbeam, AMC went on to own Norton, James and Francis-Barnett. In 1943 AMC sold the Sunbeam name to BSA and Sunbeam Cycles Limited was incorporated. Sunbeams were built not at BSA's main factory at Small Heath, Birmingham, but at another BSA factory in Redditch, Worcestershire. Three Sunbeam motorcycle models were produced from 1946 to 1956, inspired by BMW motorcycles supplied to the Wehrmacht during the Second World War. They were followed by two scooter models from 1959 to 1964.

== Models ==
=== Sunbeam bicycles ===
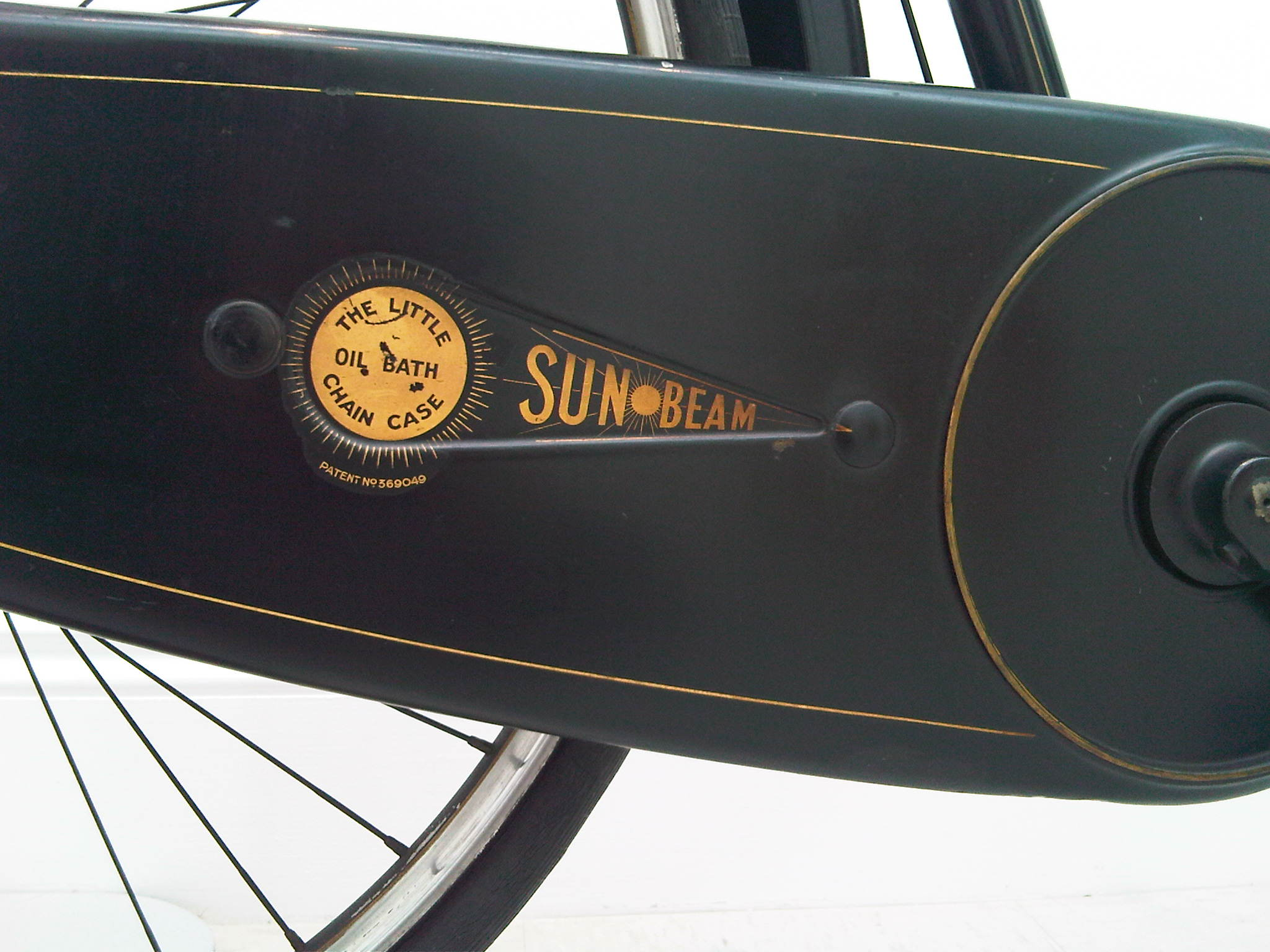
Oil-bath chaincase

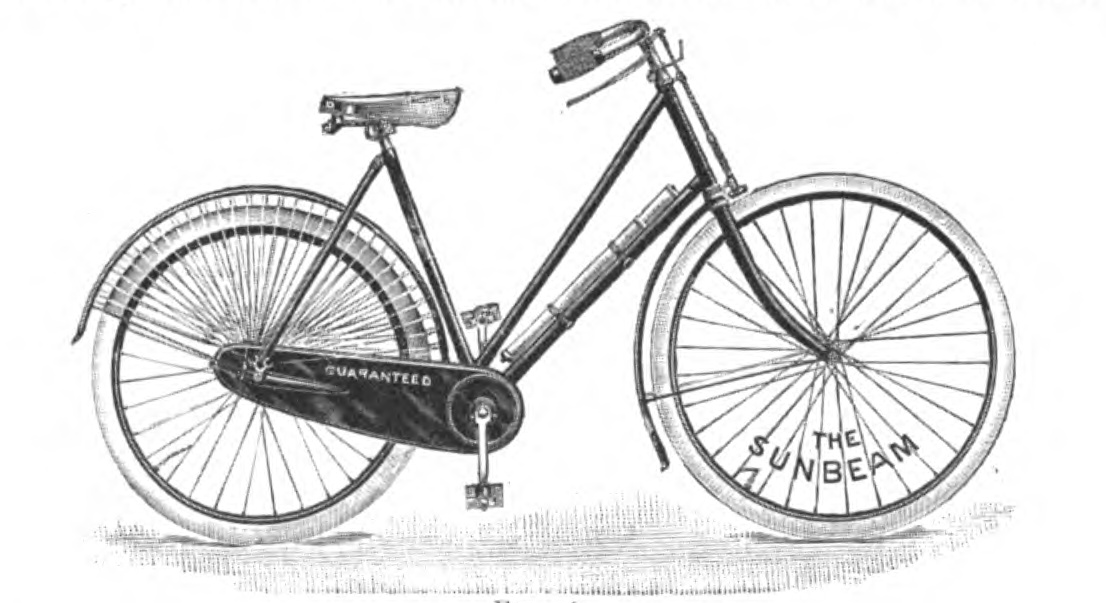
1896 Ladies' safety bicycle

Sunbeam bicycles (always "The Sunbeam") were made in Wolverhampton from 1887 to 1937. As the factory was used to sheet-metal working and japanning (the Victorian equivalent of today's oven-baked enamel or 'powder coating') the construction of cycles presented few problems. At first of similar design to other makers' machines, the company adopted a version of Harrison Carter's Little oil-bath chain case in the mid-1890s. The cycle was re-designed so that the oil contained in the oil bath lubricated the bottom bracket, chain and rear hub, the only cycle so designed to date.

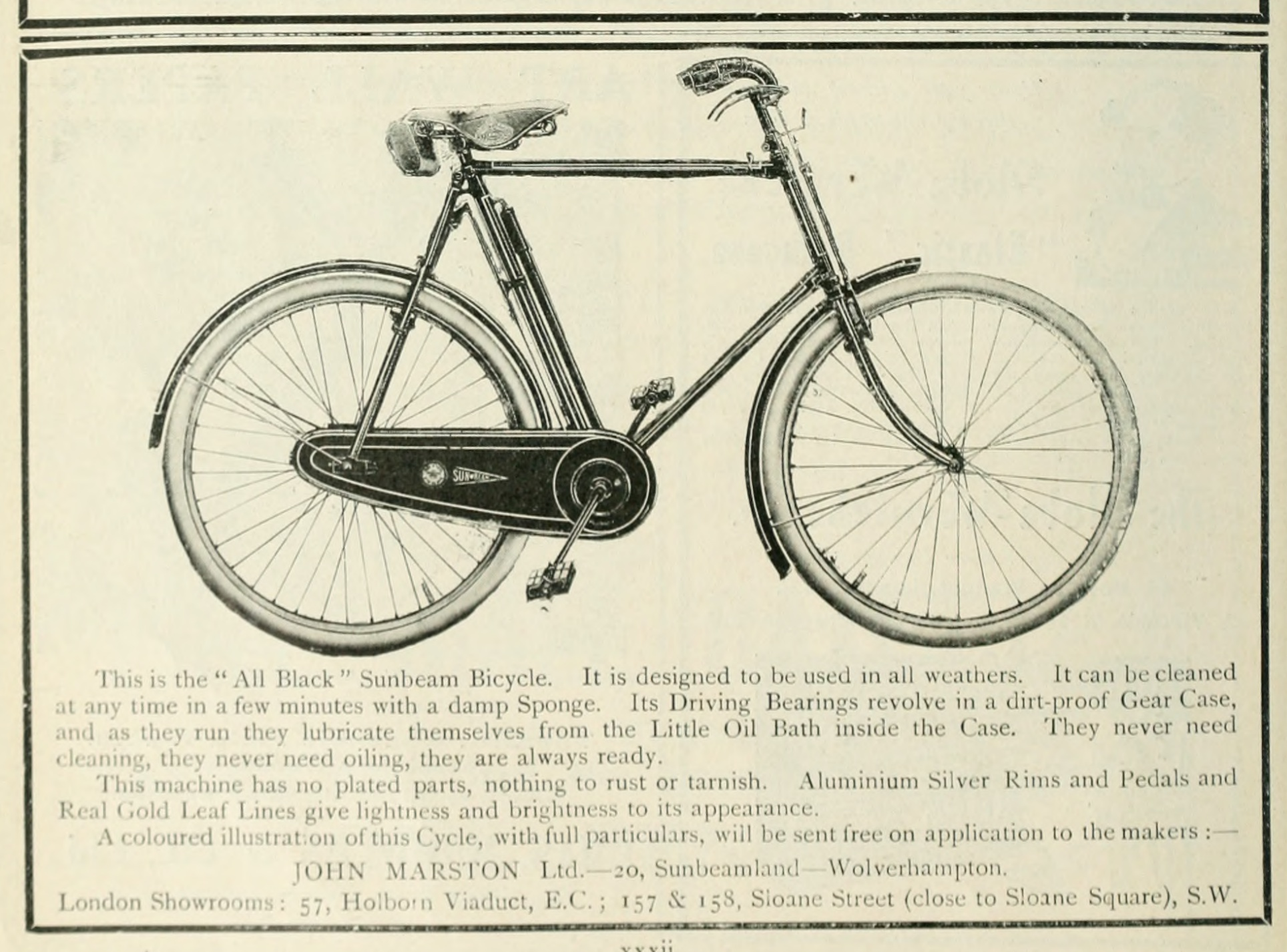
1912 Men's safety bicycle

The Sunbeam was designed to last a gentleman a lifetime and such is their longevity that models a century-old still have their original finish, chain and transmission. The top model was the "Golden", with alloy wheel-rims, epicyclic two- and three-speed gears and real gold-leaf pin-striping. The "Royal" was of the same quality but had red lining and simpler equipment. The 'RR' model was used at the Olympics in 1929 and the later 'Golden Light Roadster' was made from the latest 'Cromoly' tubing. These and other models were made alongside the motor cycles at "Sunbeamland", Pool Street, Wolverhampton until 1937 and subsequently, to the same designs, by AMC until 1943 and BSA until 1957.

=== Sunbeam motorcycles ===
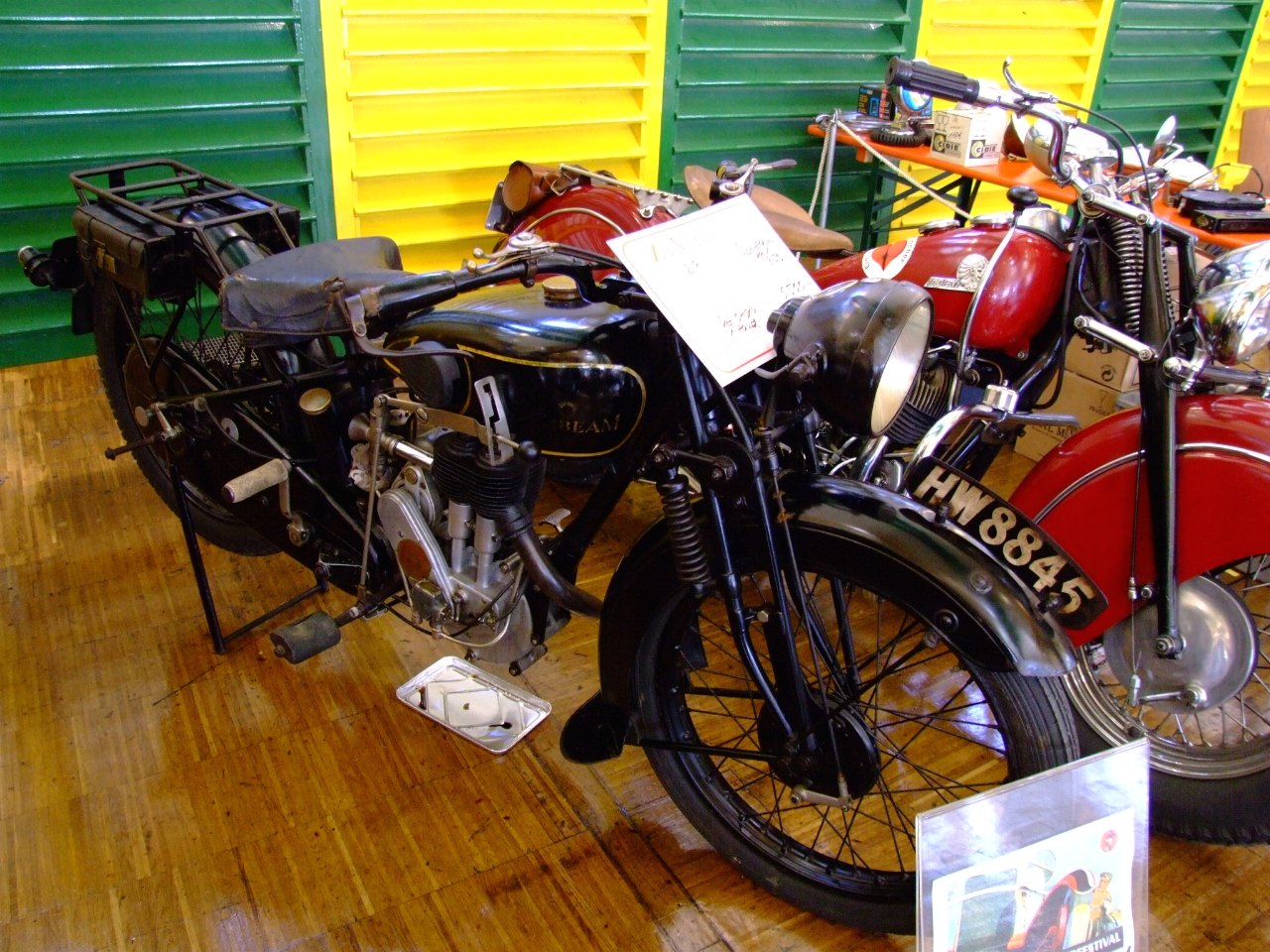
1929 Sunbeam

Many John Marston Sunbeam motorcycle models were produced. The first was a 350 cc in 1912 followed by a range of 500 cc singles and some v-twins. In 1924, a new model numbering system was introduced; Sunbeam Models 1 to 11. Other, higher-numbered models were produced in later years. The majority had single-cylinder engines, winning the TT races often, the last time in 1929. A hallmark of all Marston Sunbeams was the superb quality and finish in black with gold-leaf coach-lining.

=== S model motorcycles ===
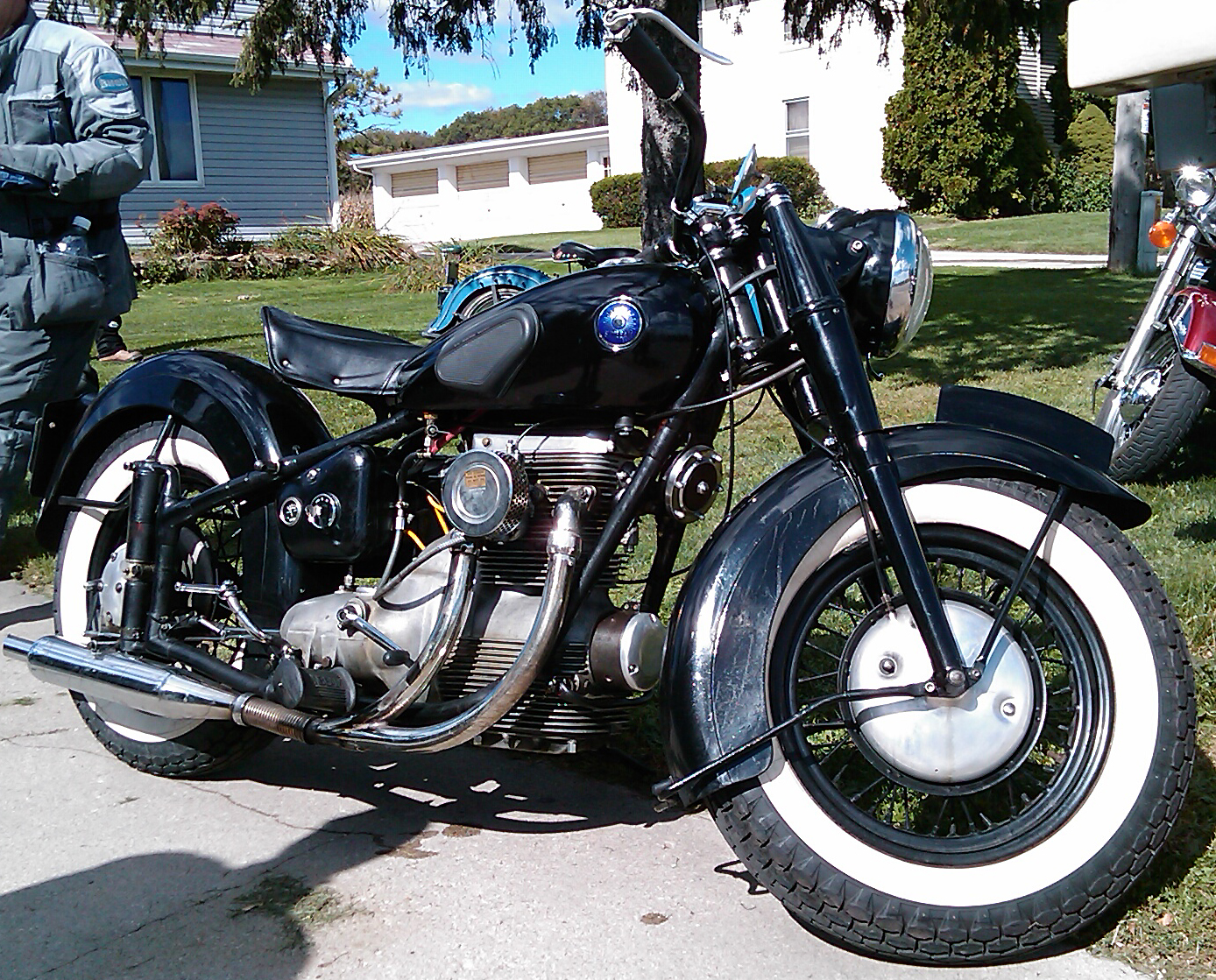
A mildly customised Sunbeam S7 motorcycle

The S models were designed for BSA by Erling Poppe and manufactured from 1946 to 1956. There were three: the S7, S8 and S7 Deluxe. All three were very expensive but with only modest performance which resulted in low sales.

The unusual engine layout was the S7's notable feature with an engine and drive similar to that of a car. The engine was a longitudinally mounted inline vertical OHC 500 cc twin with coil ignition and wet sump lubrication which, through a dry clutch, drove a shaft drive to the rear wheel. The inline engine made this technologically feasible (flat-twin "boxer" engines on BMW motorcycles had already used shaft drives). Unlike BMW, who sensibly used a bevel gear crown-&-pinion drive to the rear wheel, Sunbeam used worm gearing with a bronze spiral gear. The soft bronze was reputed to give rapid wear of drive components.

The S7 was made from 1946 to 1948. In 1949, the sportier S8, with standard wheel rims instead of the fat tyres of the S7, and BSA type front fork, was produced. The S7 design was improved, and then sold as the S7 Deluxe. The original S7 was available only in black, whereas the standard colours for the S8 were "Polychromatic Grey" or black. The S7 Deluxe came in either "Mist Green" or black. If sold abroad then BSA would supply the Sunbeam in almost any colour that BSA used. Although the early S7 was not a good seller or mechanically very sound, it is the most sought after and commands a premium over the S7 Deluxe and the S8.

When Sunbeam production came to an end, BSA sold the remaining stock of parts to Stewart Engineering, and this company is now the sole supplier of spares for post-war Sunbeam motorcycles.

=== B model scooters ===
1959 to 1964

B1, B2 Scooters (see BSA Sunbeam).
