= Tole painting =

Style of painting

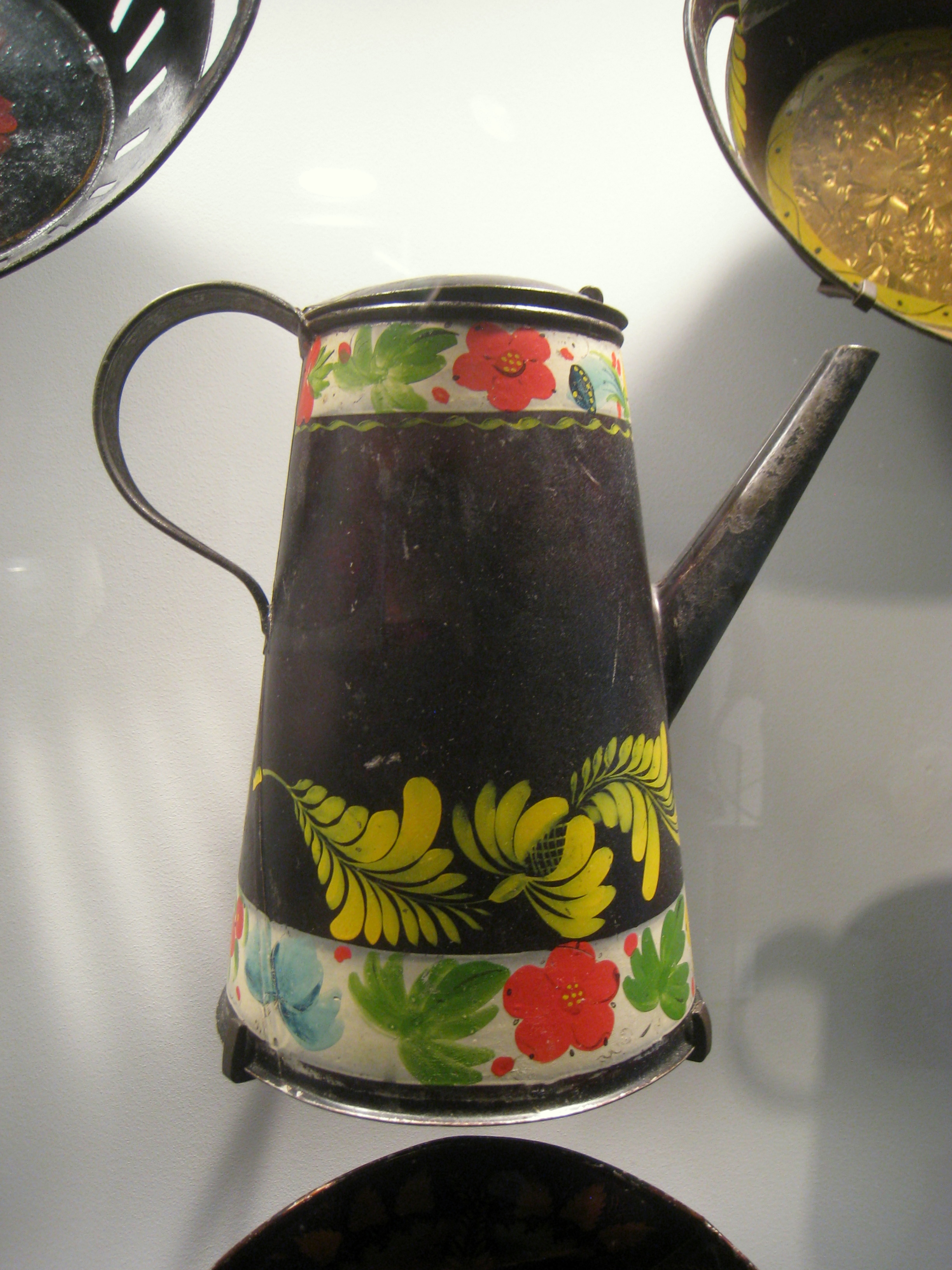

Tole painting is the folk art of decorative painting on tin and wooden utensils, objects and furniture. Typical metal objects include utensils, coffee pots, and similar household items. Wooden objects include tables, chairs, and chests, including hope chests, toyboxes and jewelry boxes.

With a longer history in Europe (see toleware), in America the practice began in 18th century New England, and was also extensively carried on among German immigrants in Pennsylvania. A separate, related tradition occurs in the Netherlands and among Scandinavian countries and immigrants, including Norwegians, Danes and Swedes. German tole painting may concentrate more on metal and tin objects, while Scandinavians and Netherlanders may concentrate more on wooden objects and furniture. Patterns in the two traditions vary slightly as well.

Modern tole painting typically uses inexpensive, long-lasting and sturdy acrylic paints. Good quality wooden work is sealed, primed and sanded before the decorative paint is applied.

The most beloved family objects tend to be high quality utensils or furniture, painted freehand with favorite patterns, colors or flowers, humorous themes, family in-jokes, or illustrations of favorite or family stories. The perceived value of a tole utensil increases with its quality as a utensil, the quality of the art, and the personalization, the story, of the work.

An advantage of tole painting as a craft is that a bad painting can be sanded off and repainted. One of the signs of such repaintings is a black-backgrounded tole-painted object. Very often such objects are repainted, especially if the furniture or utensil is valuable and the painter is inexperienced.

== Modern history ==
Tole painting experienced a resurgence in the 1960s when teachers began opening studios in cities around the United States. One notable teacher is Priscilla Hauser of Tulsa, Oklahoma. After opening Priscilla's Little Red Tole House in 1968, she began to organize teachers and studios around the midwest, trained students to become teachers, and in 1972 began the National Society of Tole and Decorative Painters, which would eventually become the Society of Decorative Painters. Tole painting is now a worldwide phenomenon, largely due to the international expansion of the now 50-year-old Society of Decorative Painters.

== See also ==
- Folk art
- Rosemaling, Norwegian, literally "rose painting"
- Kurbits, Swedish folk art
- Toleware Tôle Peinte, French, literally "painting on sheet metal"
- Bauernmalerei, German, literally "farmers painting"
- Hindeloopen
- English canal Narrowboat roses and castles painting
- Romani caravan painting
