= Toleware =

Japanned metalware

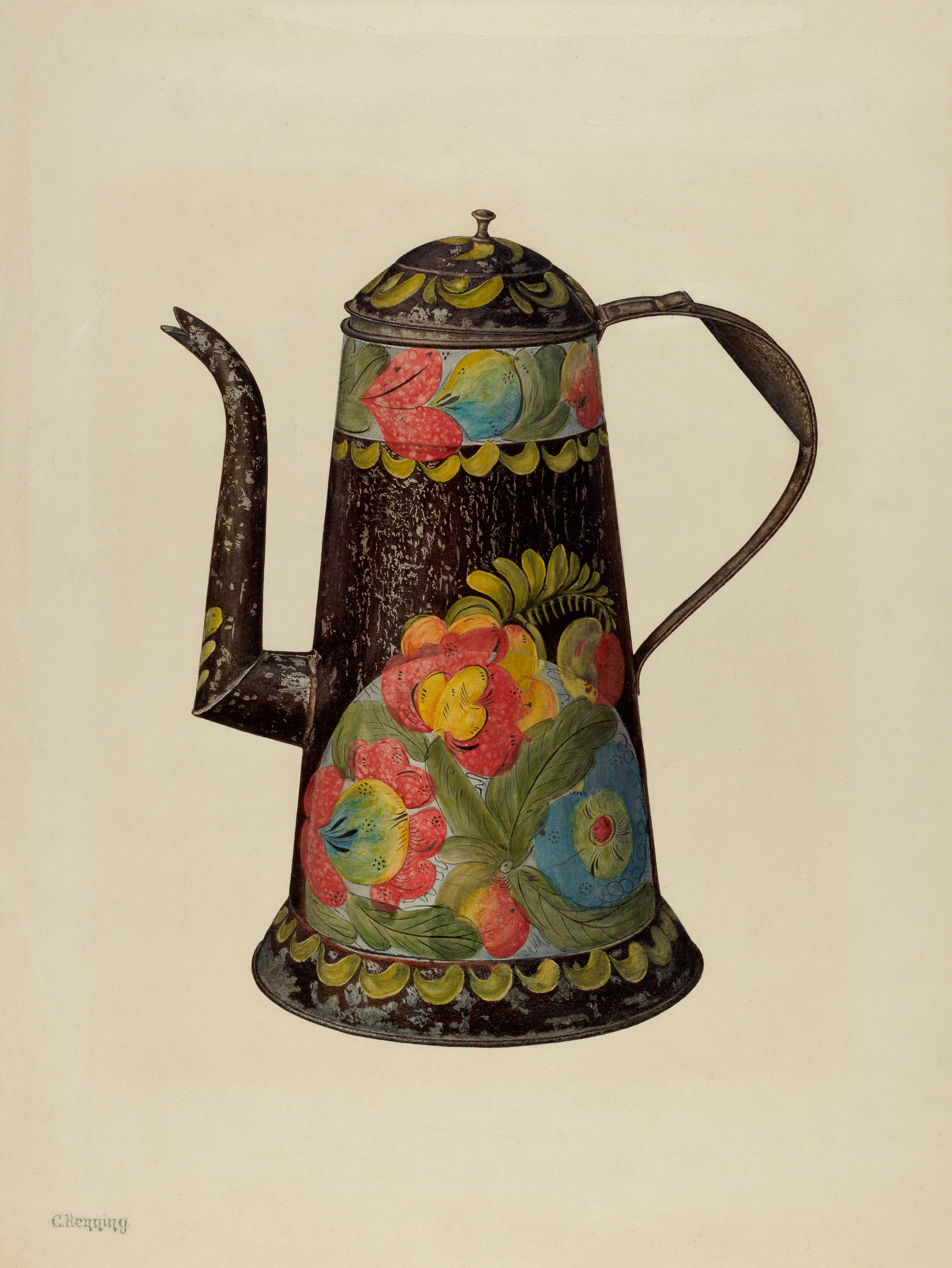
Toleware coffee pot, circa 1940

The term tôle, derived from the French tôle peinte, "painted sheet metal", is synonymous in English usage with japanning on tin, such as the tôle shades for bouillotte lamps and other candle shades, and trays and lidded canisters, in which stenciling and gilding often features, almost always on a black ground. Pontypool and Usk in South Wales made a reputation for tôle imitating Japanese lacquer starting in the early 19th century.

In American collectibles and antiques, toleware refers to kitchen-related objects created from metal, typically tin or thin steel, and are often in decorative styles such as Arts and Crafts and Pennsylvania Dutch. Decorative painting on these items is common but not necessary. This style of decorative art spread from Europe to the United States in the 18th century, and was popular in US kitchens in the 18th and 19th centuries.

In the field of handicrafts, tole painting on metal objects is a popular amateur pastime.

Toleware was featured on a United States Postal Service 1979 15-cent stamp, and in 2002 as part of the American Design Make-up stamp series with a value of 5 cents.
