= Sunbeamland =

Manufacturing complex in Wolverhampton, England

Coordinates: 52.5795°N 2.1322°W

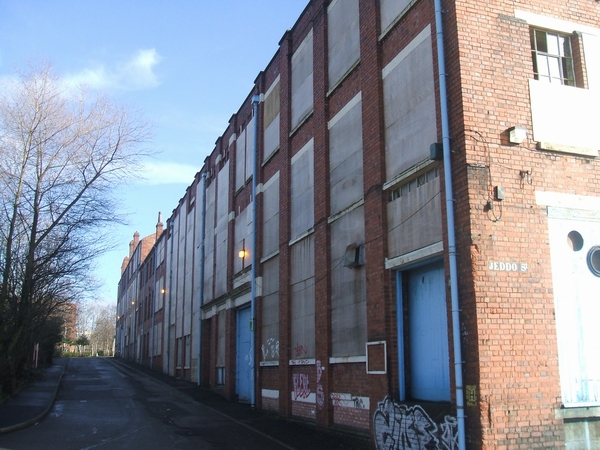
Paul Street in 2009

Sunbeamland is the name for a manufacturing complex close to the centre of Wolverhampton, near England's "Black Country". Sunbeamland is where John Marston, a design engineer and entrepreneur, developed several large clusters of factory buildings. The name "Sunbeamland" is derived from the Sunbeam range of motorcycles. A mile south of Sunbeamland, in Blakenhall, lies the Sunbeam Motor Car Company and Villiers Engineering, which became two of Wolverhampton's most important industries.

== Sunbeamland - Sunbeam Cycle Works ==
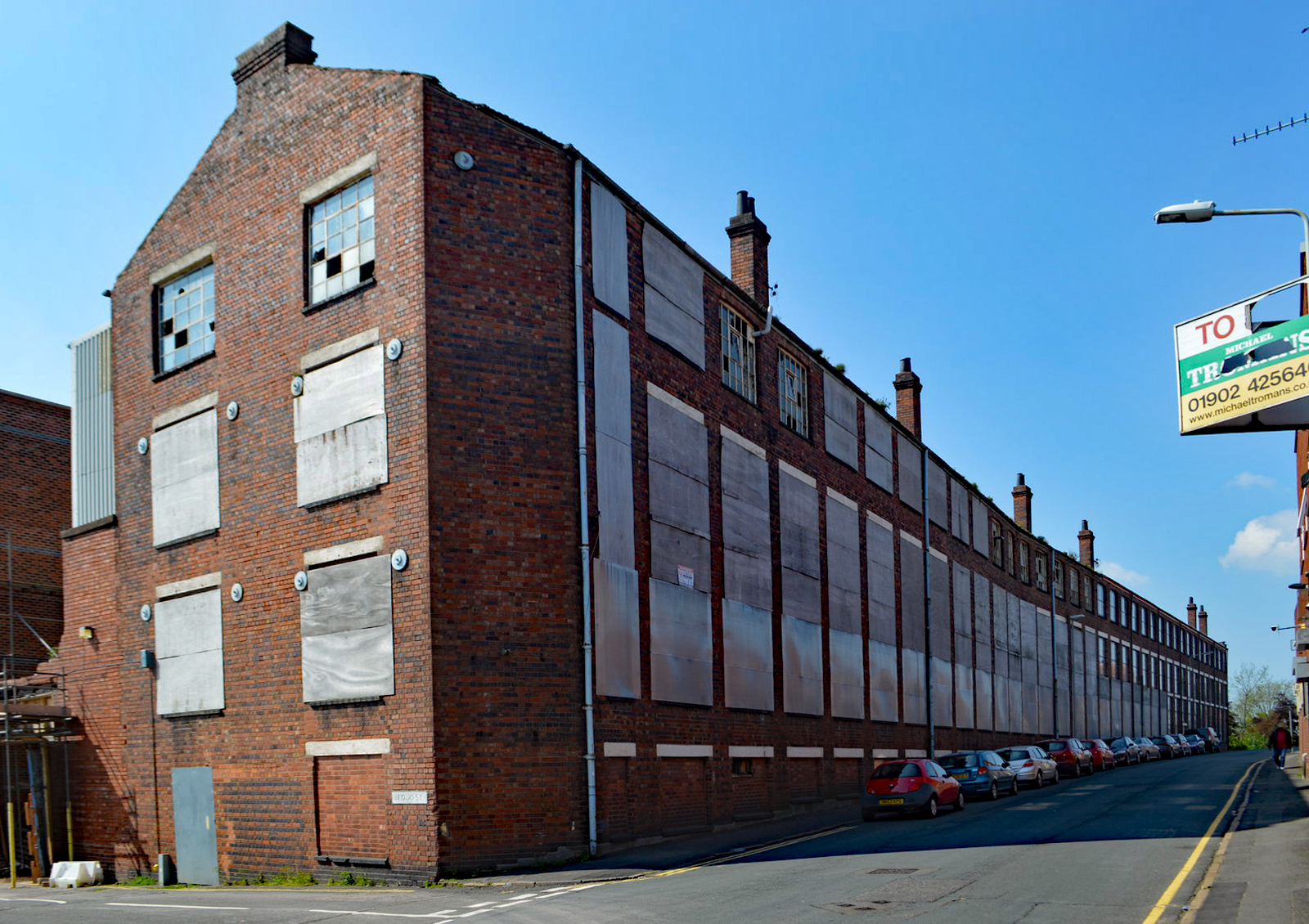
Pool Street 2009

Sunbeamland was John Marston Limited's bicycle and motorcycle factory on Wolverhampton's Paul Street fronting onto the Penn Road island now that the other side of the street has been cleared. They were built on the site of Edward Perry's Jeddo Works, which Marston had bought from Perry's estate in 1871.

The building, disused since the late 1990s, was declined Listed Building status by English Heritage but Wolverhampton City Council provided their own local 'listed' status. Work has since begun to convert the building into apartments.

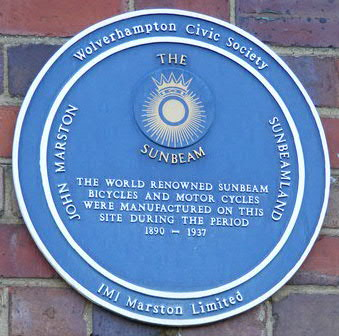
Blue Plaque awarded by Wolverhampton Civic Society attached to the Sunbeamland works

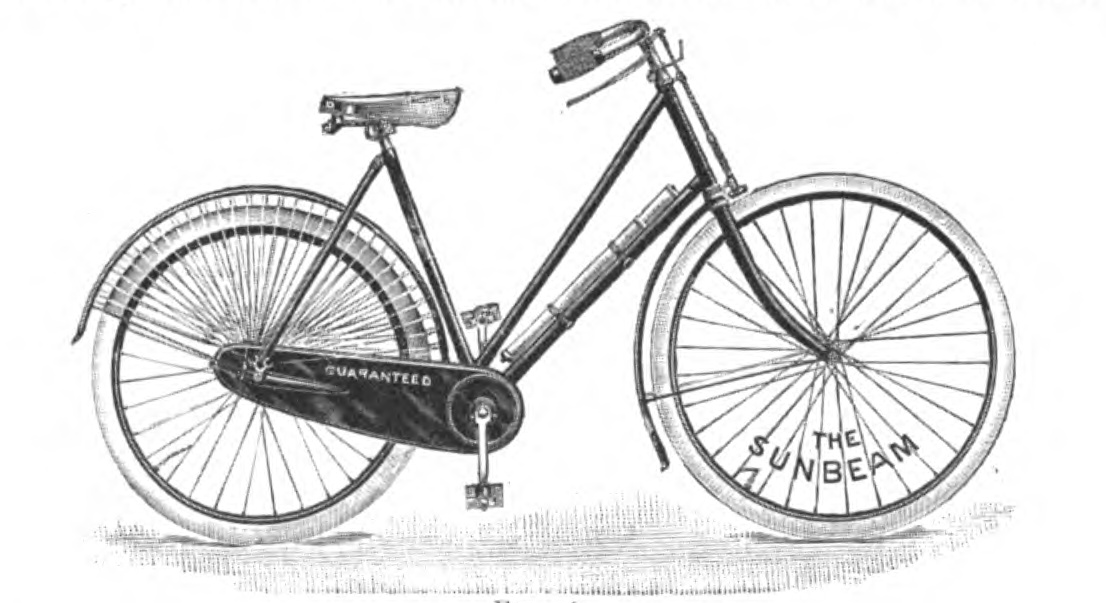

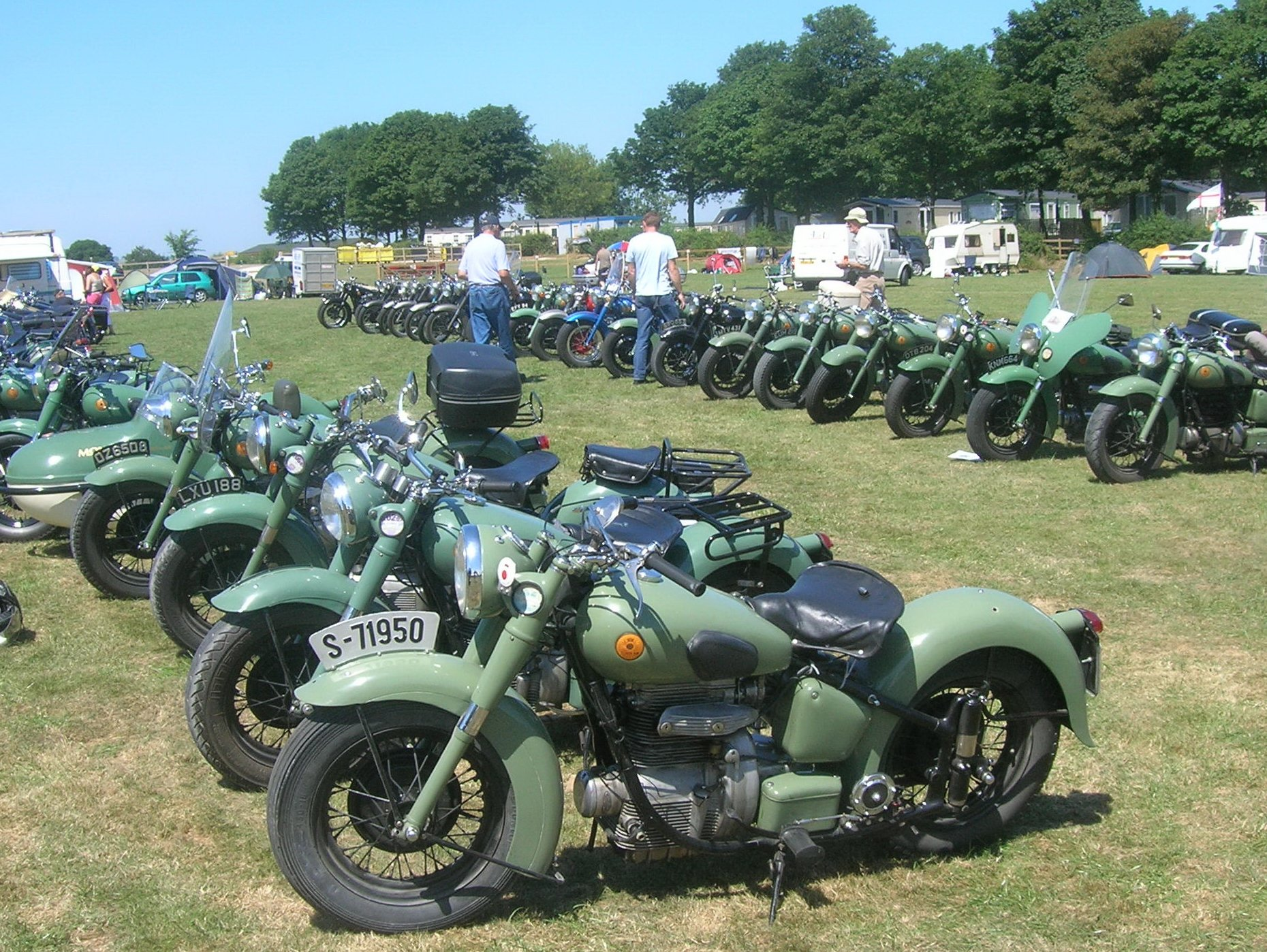

== Villiers Engineering Works - Blakenhall ==
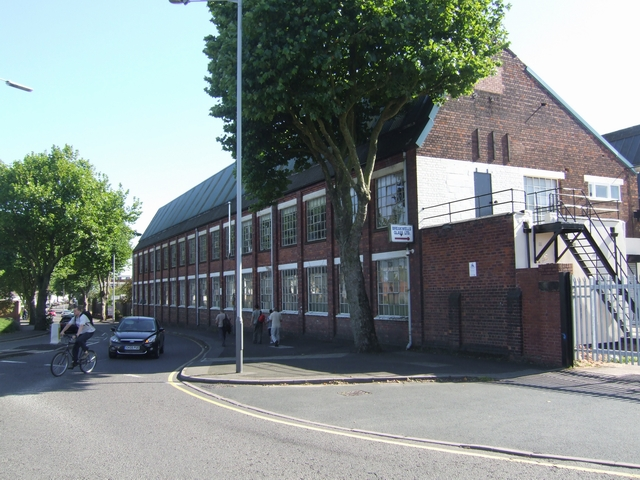
Marston Road 2009

Villiers Engineering's first premises were a mile south of Sunbeamland in Blakenhall. They had been Edward Bullifant's Blakenhall Tin and Japan works premises on the east side of Upper Villiers Street close to St Luke's church. They were bought by John Marston in 1898 to house a new business to be run by Marston's son to make components for Sunbeam cycles. The son bought the business from his father in 1902. Just before the First World War they began to make small two-stroke petrol engines.

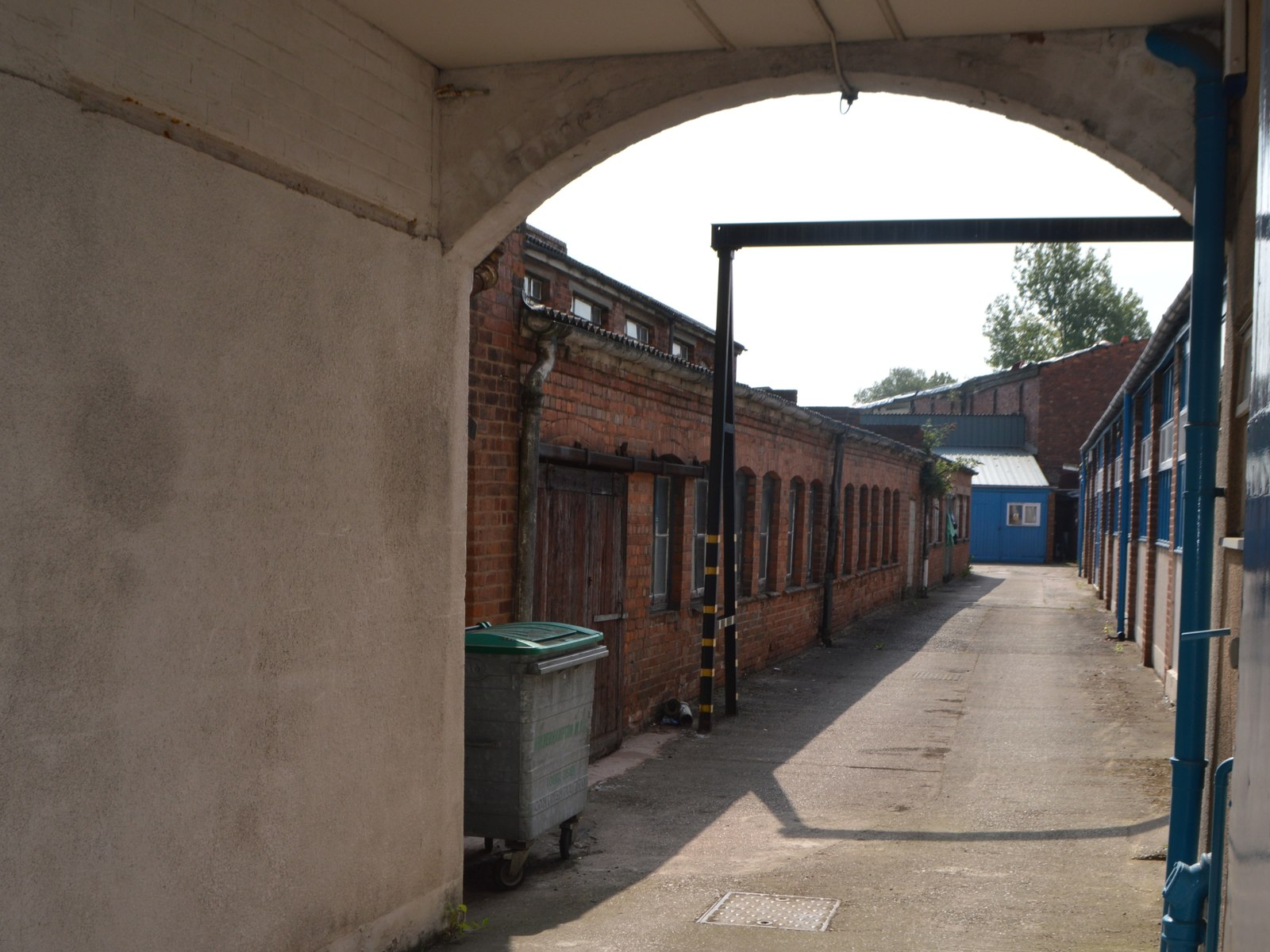
Yard behind Upper Villiers Street premises

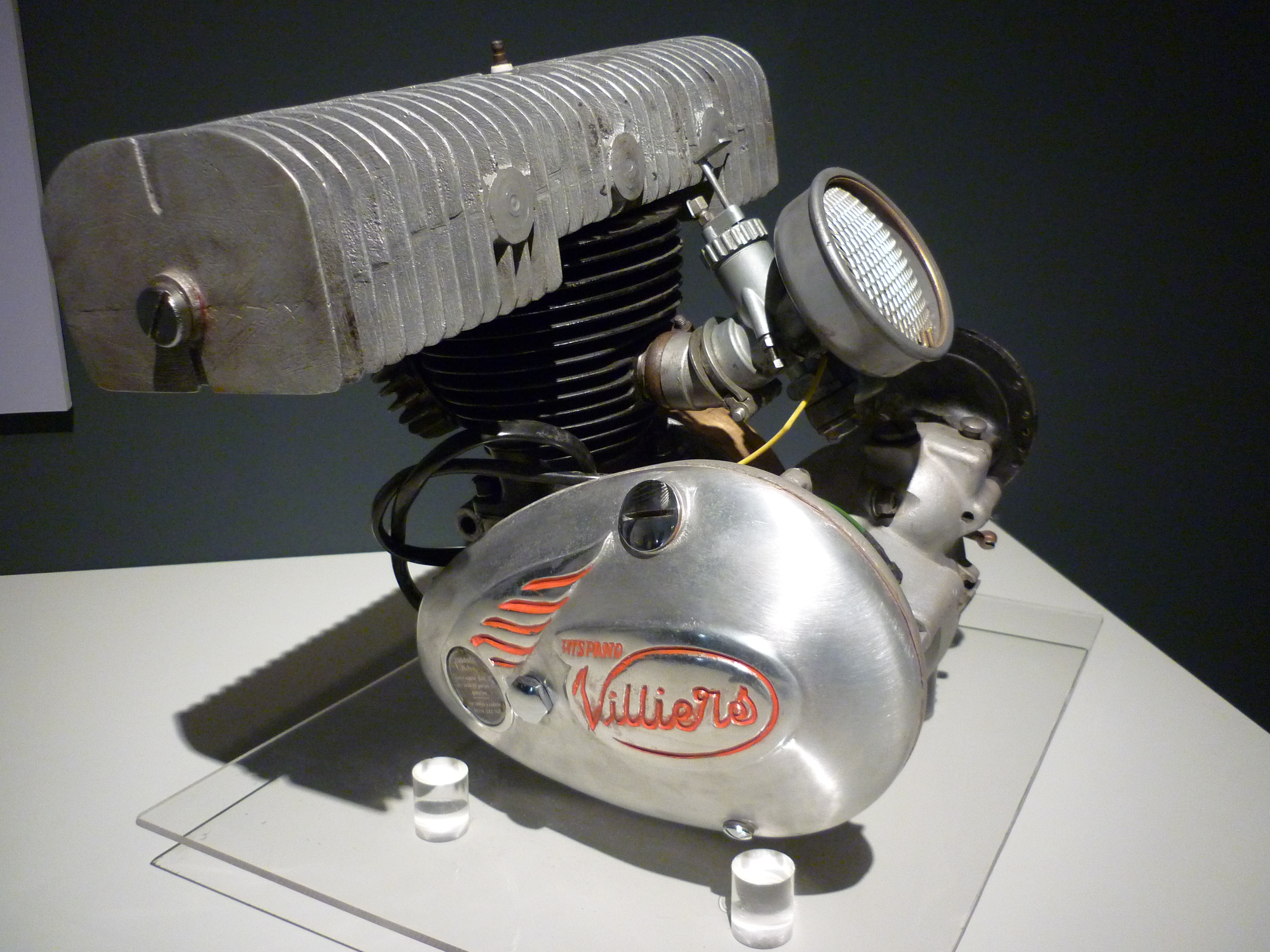
A Villiers engine with a non-standard cylinder head

== Sunbeam Motor Car Company - Moorfield Works Blakenhall ==
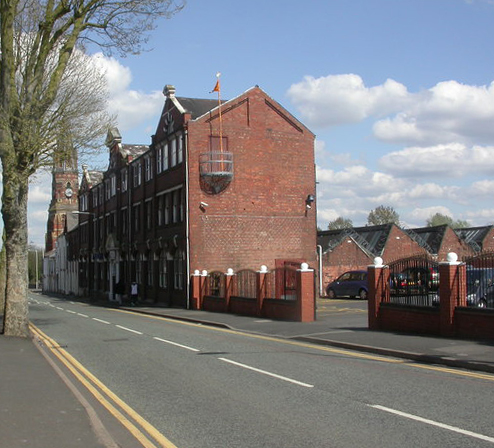
Portion of Moorfields Works 2009 Offices, showroom and workshops for Sunbeam Motor Car Company Upper Villiers St, Wolverhampton Automotive House, 1905–1906, Grade II, on the site of Moorfield House. Moorfield House's former stable was the workshop in which a Sunbeam motor car was first produced Joseph Lavender, F.R.I.B.A., St Luke's Church, Blakenhall is in the left background

Moorfield Works, the new buildings built in 1905 on the site of Moorfield House for the new Sunbeam Motor Car Company. The house and its grounds bought by Marston in 1898 were on the southern boundary of the first Villiers Engineering premises. The first Sunbeam car was built in the house's old stables. The works are on the opposite side of Upper Villiers Street.

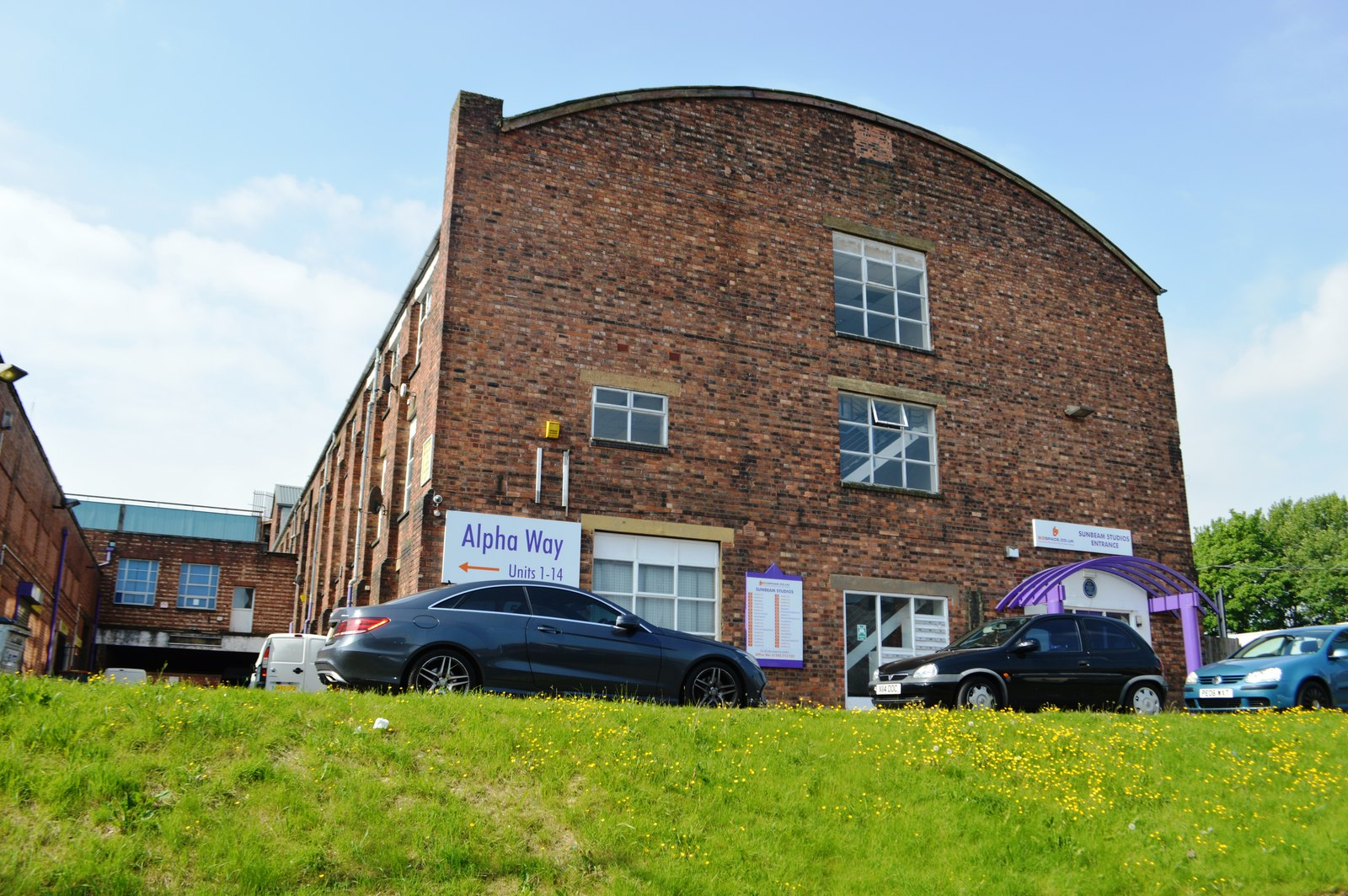
The experimental workshops where special cars and engines were built

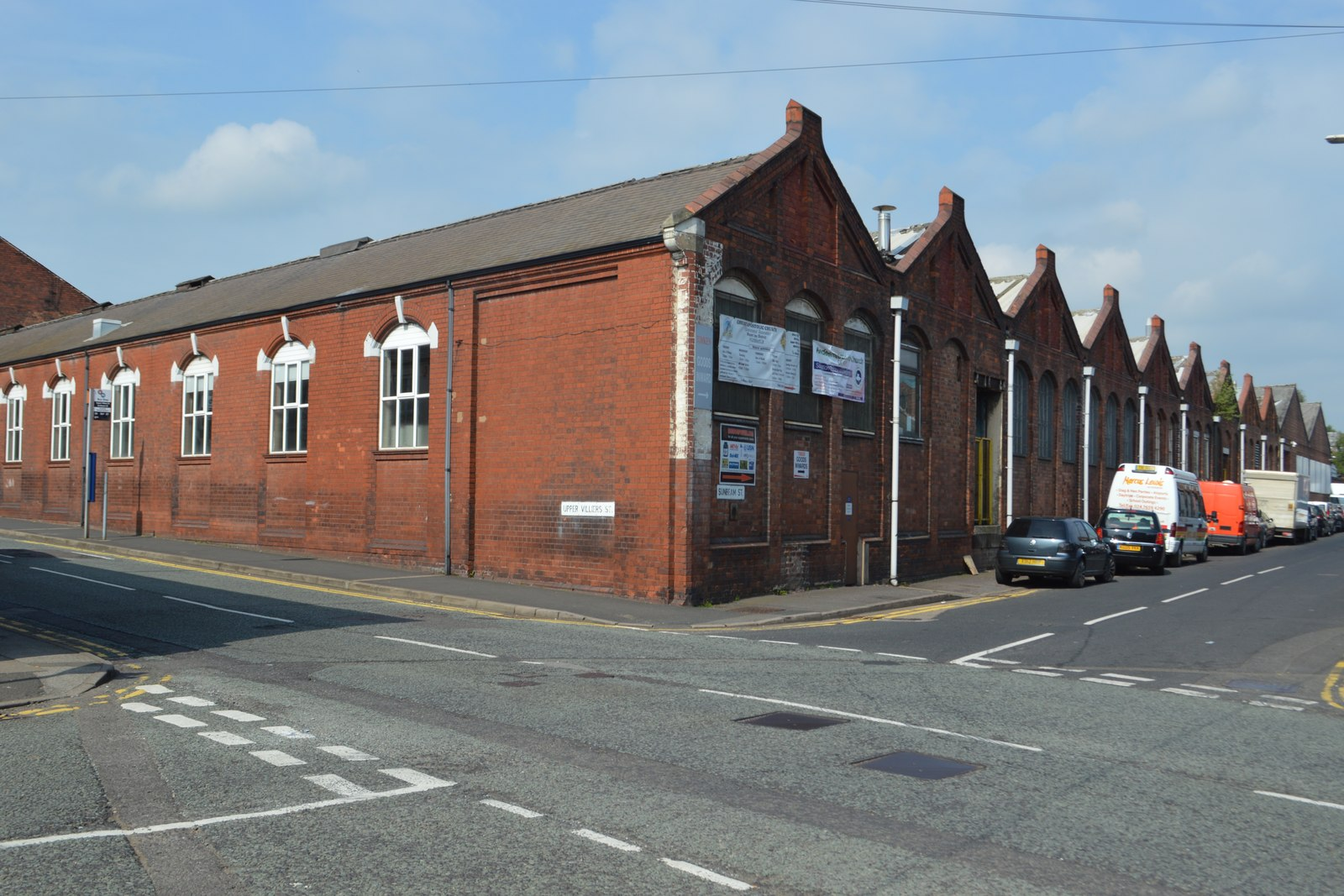
Paint shop 2009

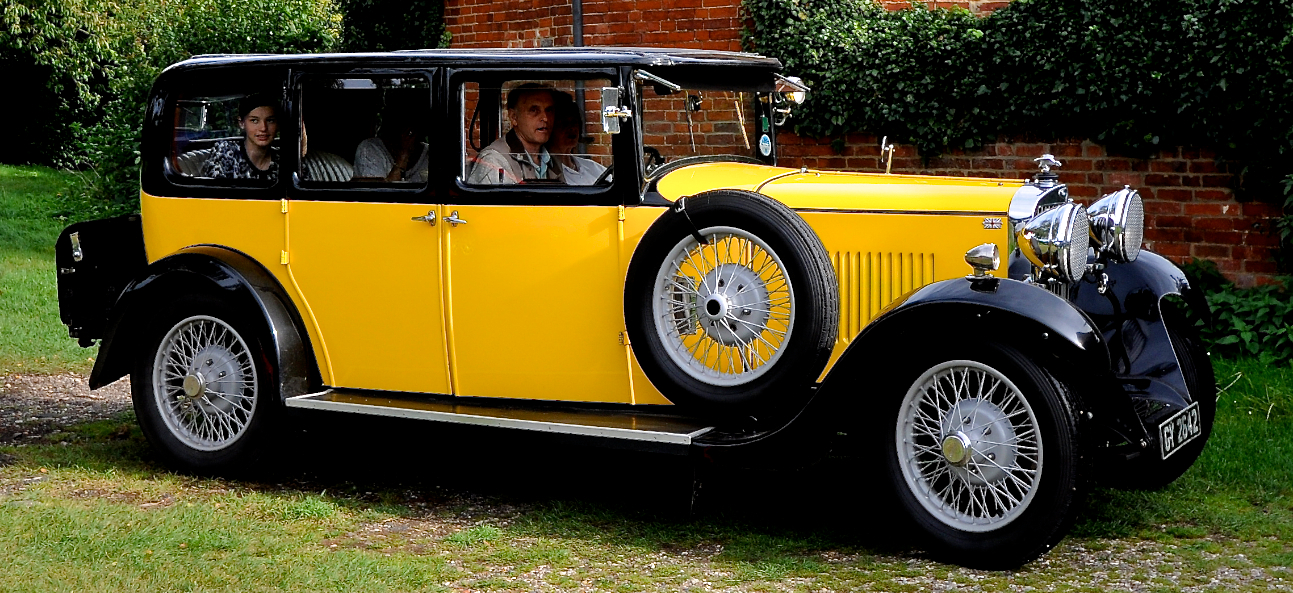
