= Sir Robert Bird, 2nd Baronet =

British politician (1876–1960)

Sir Robert Bland Bird, 2nd Baronet
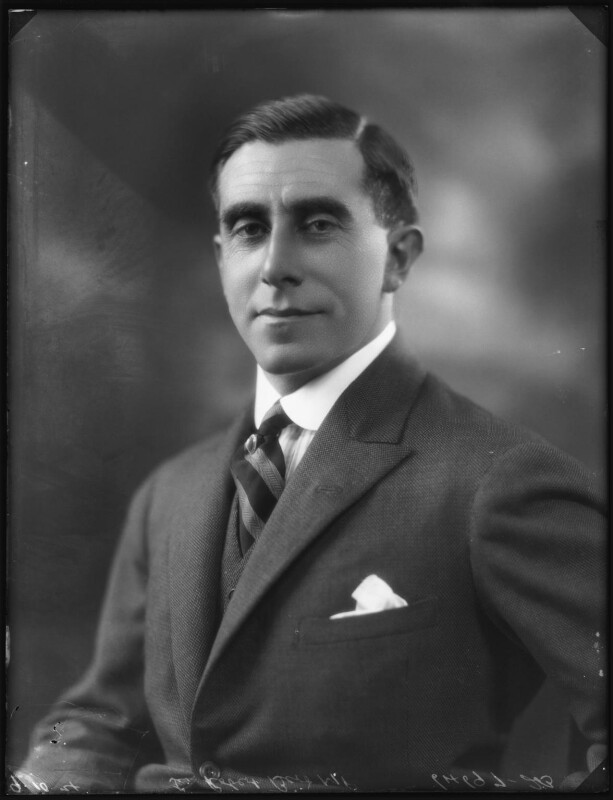
- Bird in 1924
- Born: September 20, 1876
- Died: November 20, 1960 (aged 84)
- Occupation: Conservative Party politician

Sir Robert Bland Bird, 2nd Baronet KBE (20 September 1876 – 20 November 1960) was a Conservative Party politician in the United Kingdom.

== Biography ==
He was elected as Member of Parliament (MP) for Wolverhampton West at a by-election in March 1922 following the death of his father Sir Alfred, who had been the constituency's MP since January 1910.

Robert Bird was re-elected at the next three general elections, but was defeated at the 1929 general election by the Labour Party candidate William Brown. Bird regained the seat in 1931, and held it until he stood down at the 1945 general election.

Bird had succeeded to his father's baronetcy, and also succeeded him as chairman of the family's business Alfred Bird and Sons, manufacturing chemists. The company had been established by his grandfather Alfred Bird, who invented both baking powder and custard powder.

He was invested as a Chevalier in the French Légion d'honneur in 1947 and as an Officer of the Order of Leopold (Belgium) (in recognition of services rendered to Belgian interests during World War II) in 1951. In the New Year Honours in 1954, he was made a Knight Commander of the Order of the British Empire (KBE), "for political and public services". Away from politics he was a photographer and a member of the Royal Photographic Society from 1915 until 1960. Between c. 1915 and 1920 he produced a body of early colour photography using the autochrome process, some of which was exhibited in the RPS's annual exhibition.

== Notes ==
Parliament of the United Kingdom
Preceded by Alfred Bird	Member of Parliament for Wolverhampton West; 1922–1929	Succeeded by William Brown
Preceded by William Brown	Member of Parliament for Wolverhampton West; 1931–1945	Succeeded by Billy Hughes
Baronetage of the United Kingdom
Preceded by Alfred Bird	Baronet (of Edgbaston); 1933–1960	Succeeded by Donald Bird
