= Bird baronets =

Baronetcy in the Baronetage of the United Kingdom

Bird Baronetcy
- Escutcheon of Bird baronets
- Created by: George V
- Peerage: Baronetage of the United Kingdom
- First holder: Alfred Frederick Bird
- Present holder: Sir John Andrew Bird, 5th Baronet
- Heir apparent: Henry John Bird

The Bird Baronetcy, of Solihull in the County of Warwick, is a title in the Baronetage of the United Kingdom.

It was created on 27 January 1922 for the chemist and food manufacturer Sir Alfred Frederick Bird, the son of Alfred Bird, the inventor of Bird's Custard. Bird was succeeded by his eldest son, the second Baronet, who was the chairman of the family firm of Alfred Bird & Sons Ltd and also represented Wolverhampton West in Parliament.

When Sir Robert died without male issue, he was succeeded by his nephew, Sir Donald Geoffrey. He was the son of Geoffrey Bird, second son of the first Baronet. Sir Richard Geoffrey Chapman Bird was the fourth Baronet, who succeeded in 1963 and died on 16 June 2021. He was succeeded in 2021 by his son, the fifth baronet, Sir John Andrew Bird

== Bird baronets, of Solihull (1922) ==
- Sir Alfred Frederick Bird, 1st Baronet (1849–1922)
- Sir Robert Bland Bird, 2nd Baronet (1876–1960)
- Sir Donald Geoffrey Bird, 3rd Baronet (1906–1963)
- Sir Richard Geoffrey Chapman Bird, 4th Baronet (1935–2021)
- Sir John Andrew Bird, 5th Baronet (born 1964)

The heir apparent is the present holder's son Henry John Bird.
