= Custard Factory =

Arts and media production centre in Birmingham, England

Coordinates: 52.4752°N 1.8842°W

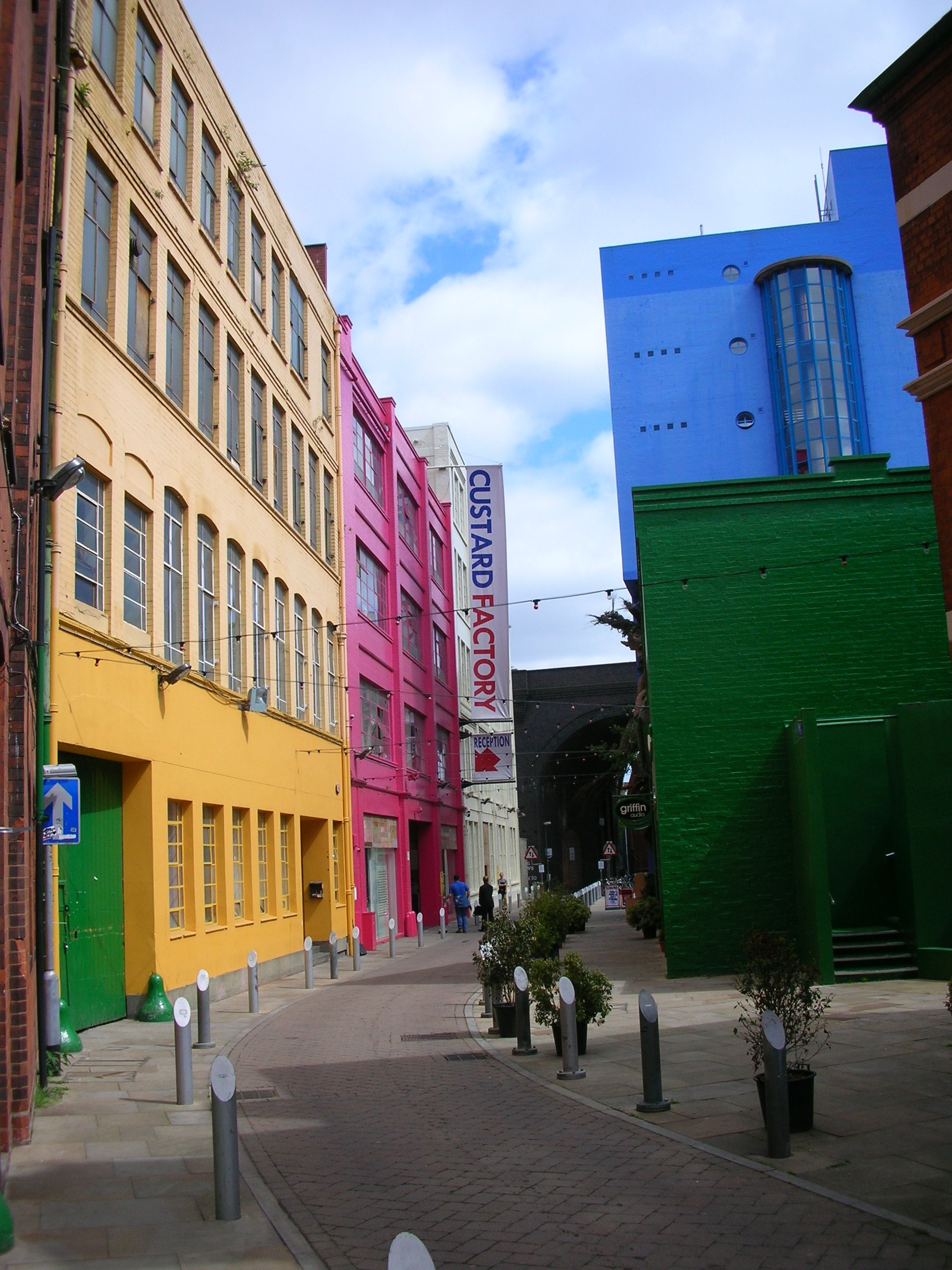
The Custard Factory in Gibb Street

The Custard Factory is a creative and digital business workspace complex, including independent shops, cafes and bars, on the site of what was the Bird's Custard factory off High Street, Deritend, in the Digbeth area of central Birmingham, England.

== Development ==
The Custard Factory complex is set in fifteen acres (60,000m^{2}) of factory buildings, originally constructed for Sir Alfred Frederick Bird (1849–1922), the son of Alfred Bird (1811–1878), the inventor of egg-free custard. The architectural firm commissioned to design the building was Hamblins. At one time, a thousand people worked at the factory. The Bird company moved to Banbury in 1964.

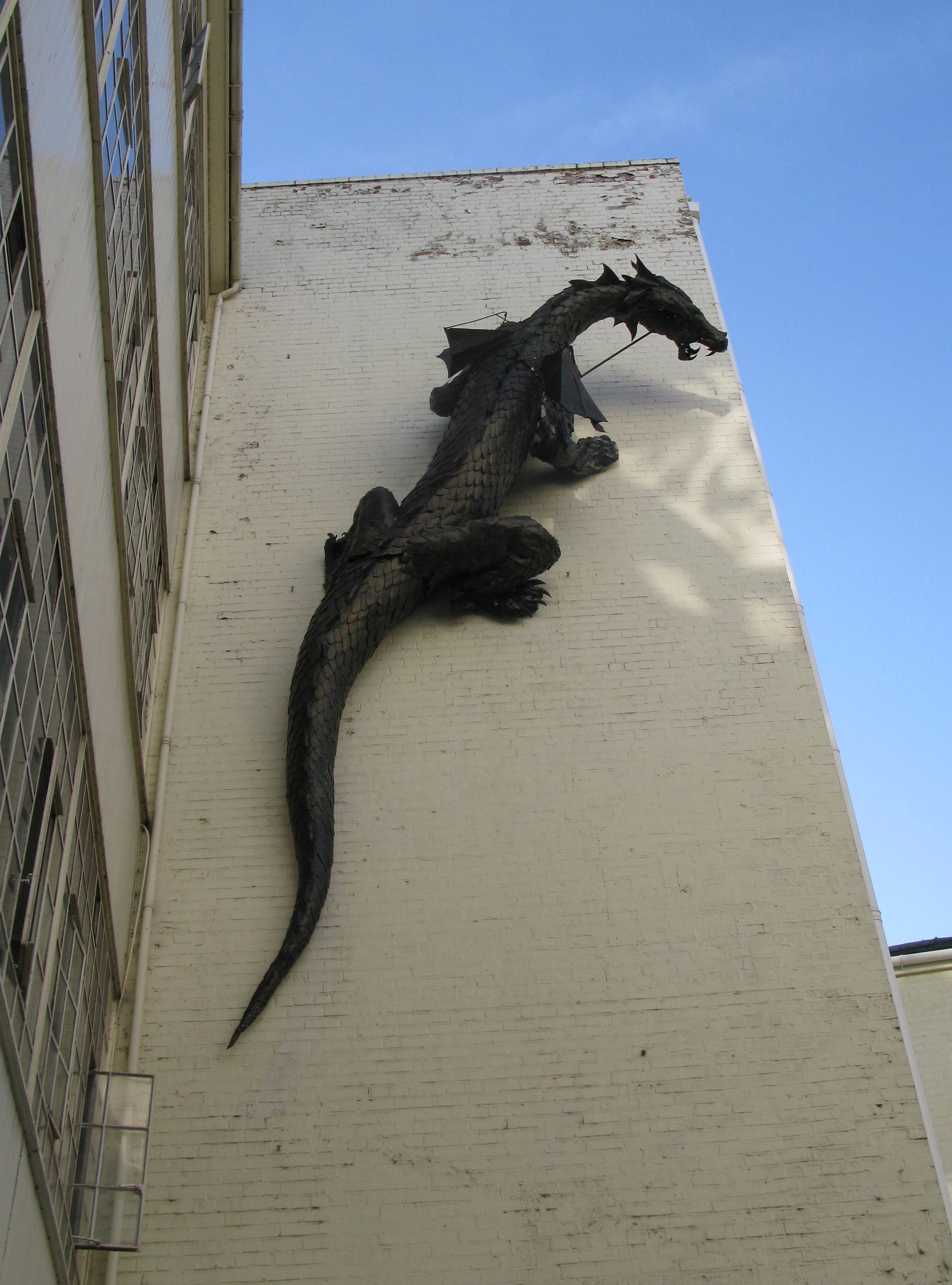
The Custard Factory Dragon sculpture

The Custard Factory project was started by Bennie Gray and substantially expanded by his son Lucan Gray, who owned and ran the project until June 2017. A City Grant Award of £800,000 was used to start the redevelopment in January 1992. This public sector funding levered in £1.6 million of private sector investment for the refurbishment of 100,000 sq ft (9,300 m^{2}) of redundant buildings, providing 145 units for use by artists, designers and communicators. The architect was the Birmingham-based firm, Glenn Howells Architects. The first phase created around 300 jobs. On the completion of the Custard Factory project, an anticipated 1,000 jobs will have been created.

Phase one consisted of the refurbishment of Scott House which is now home to a community of media companies, artists and small creative enterprises. The loading bay was turned into a lake around which are set 200 studio workshops above ground floor level. On the ground floor itself are meeting rooms, dance studios, holistic therapy rooms, a café and a record and clothes shop. In the foyer are art display cases with a larger gallery space at the rear. A huge iron dragon sculpture crawls up the exterior rear elevation. There are stages for musicians, DJs and rappers and a 220-seat theatre.

Phase two - originally named 'The Greenhouse', but now 'Gibb Square' after the Gibb Street location - was completed in 2002. It focuses on new media and media businesses and includes a hundred studio/offices plus galleries, restaurants and shops set around a central pool with fountains. The pool is sometimes emptied to allow for dance music events. The Green Man, a 40 ft (12 m) high sculpture by Tawny Gray made from vegetation and stone, overlooks Gibb Street.

=== Zellig ===
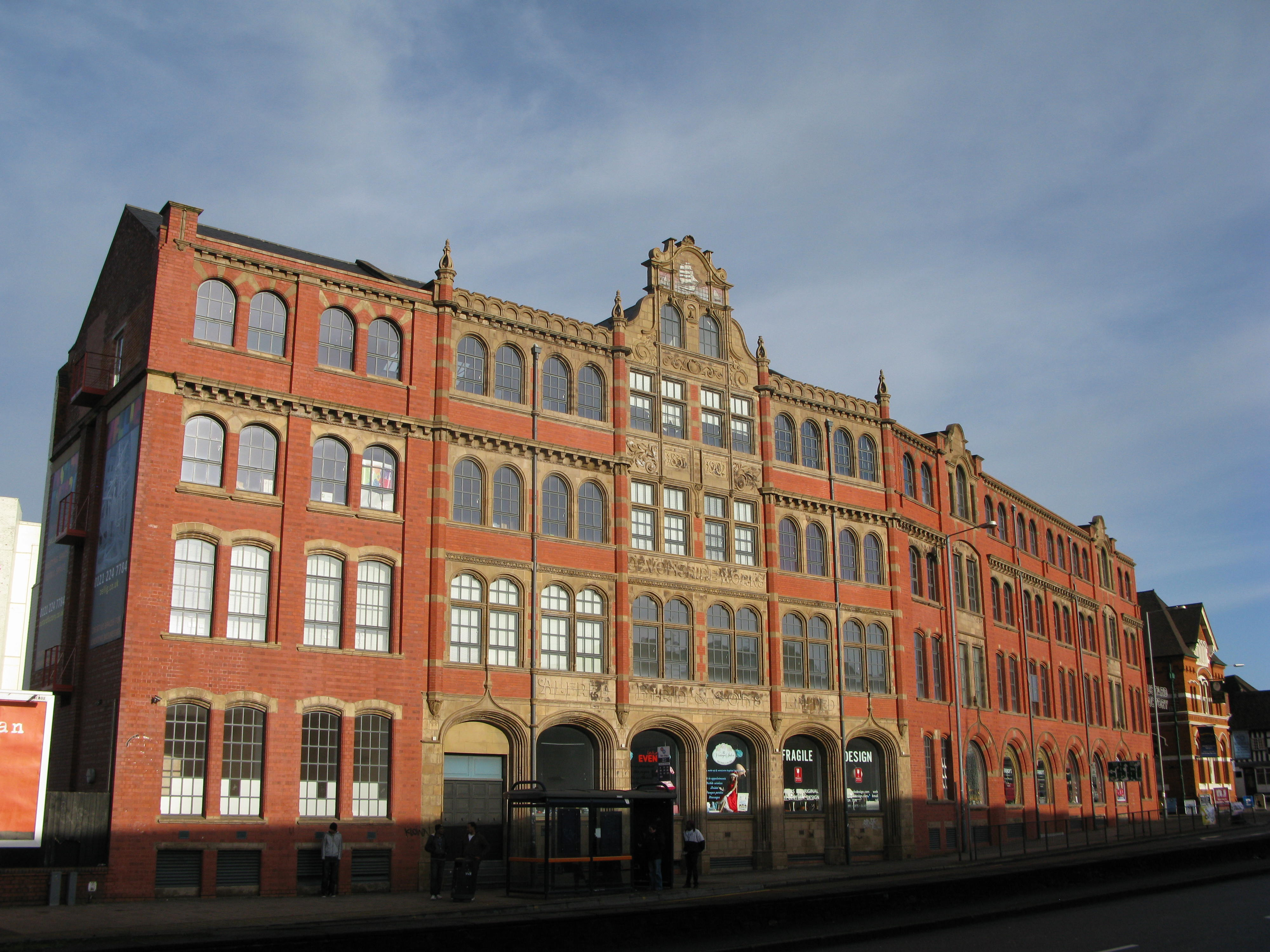
Devonshire House

In March 2007, the regional development agency, Advantage West Midlands, announced new funding of £9.6m for 100 new office and workspace units. The result was Zellig (former Devonshire House), a restored grade II listed building, which opened in May 2010 and features a new sculpture, the Deluge, by Toin Adams.

== Co-located media training ==
The presence of the Custard Factory has drawn two media training agencies to locate nearby. The old Trades Union Studies Centre is now a media and arts annexe of South Birmingham College and in 2005, the VIVID media centre moved from the Jewellery Quarter. Also nearby is Access Creative College in Birmingham, a specialist 16-19 education provider in creative vocational qualifications.

About 800 yards (730 m) away is the new "Progress Works" complex, opened in 2005 as part of the Custard Factory quarter, on Heath Mill Lane. "The Bond" complex is also a short walk away.

Three-quarters of a mile north is BIAD, the largest British university art & design teaching and research centre outside London.

=== Nearby entertainment and shopping locations ===
Nearby are two music venues, The Institute (formerly The Sanctuary) and AIR, home to and owned by Godskitchen the trance superclub. The Custard Factory is close to the Old Crown pub, a half-timbered building dating from the 14th century, Birmingham Coach Station, and the Bull Ring which is Birmingham's main shopping centre, with its landmark Selfridges building.

== Occupants ==
Notable past and current occupants include:

- Huel
- Fused Magazine
- Cartoonist Alex Hughes
- Maverick Television
- North One Television
- Punch Records
- Rhubarb Radio
- The Gadget Show
- Ocean Colour Scene
- ASOS.com
- Rare
- Codemasters
- Gensler
