= Wolverhampton West =

Wolverhampton West may refer to:

- the western area of the city of Wolverhampton in the West Midlands of England
- Wolverhampton West (UK Parliament constituency) (1885–1950, 2024–)
