= Jacobs Douwe Egberts factory =

Factory in England

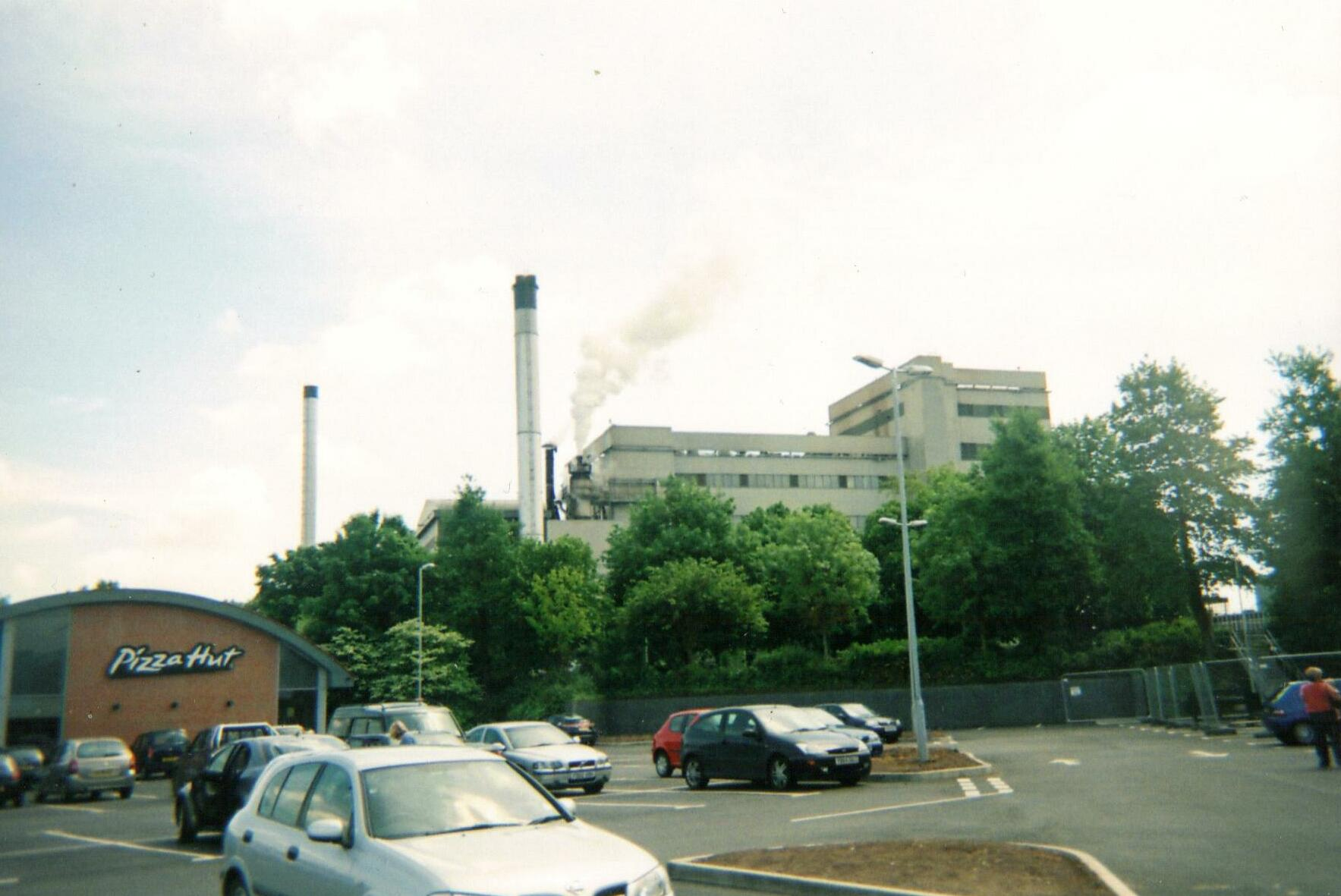
The Kraft Foods factory in Banbury has been a major employer in the town since the mid-1960s

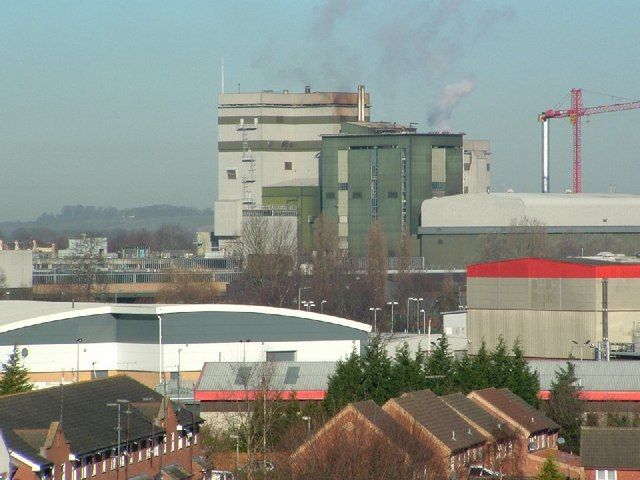
The Kraft Factory

The Jacobs Douwe Egberts factory (JDE factory) is a factory in the Ruscote ward of Banbury, Oxfordshire, England. Built in the 1960s as a General Foods factory (GF factory) producing convenience food and drink including Bird's Custard, it subsequently changed ownership to Kraft Foods and Mondelez.

== History ==
The factory was built by General Foods (GF) in 1964–66 across 42 acres at a cost of £6 million, and employed 1,300 people. It was partly due to the London overspill. In 1966, GF moved production of Bird's Custard from the former Alfred Bird & Sons factory site in Gibb Street, Birmingham (now the Custard Factory) to the new factory. 72% of the male employees at the Birmingham site relocated with the factory move.

On 18 November 1981, nine people were injured and there was structural damage after a corn starch dust explosion occurred, ignited by electrical equipment during the making of custard powder.

Kraft Foods Banbury was the Kraft Foods centre of manufacturing with the Kraft UK headquarters located at Uxbridge.

During October 2006, a block of Kraft Foods that was being prepared for demolition caught on fire and remained on fire for most of the day.

There was a non-lethal fire of coffee residues at the coffee plant on Tuesday 7 December 2010.

In Spring 2010, a truckload of Kenco Coffee was stolen by a driver who conned his way into the plant.

With the split of Kraft General Foods into Mondelez International and Kraft Foods in October 2012, this factory site became part of new company Mondelez International.

Since 2015, the factory was run by Jacobs Douwe Egberts (JDE), after they purchased the coffee side of Mondelez.

In 2023, Jacobs Douwe Egberts announced closure of processing at the factory, to make it into a packaging facility.

== See also ==
- History of Banbury
- Nestlé Tutbury, in Derbyshire, since 2014 has made Nescafé for the UK and Ireland
