= 2004 Wolverhampton City Council election =

2004 UK local government election

Map of the results of the 2004 Wolverhampton council election. Labour in red, Conservatives in blue and Liberal Democrats in yellow.

The 2004 elections held for Wolverhampton City Council on 10 June 2004 were "all out", meaning all 60 seats (3 seats in each of the 20 wards) were up for election.

The composition of the council following the election was:

- Labour 41
- Conservative 16
- Liberal Democrat 3

In each ward, 3 Councillors were elected. The candidate with the most votes was elected to serve a 4-year term, the candidate with the second highest number of votes was elected to serve a 3-year term and the candidate who finished third was elected to serve 2 years as a Councillor.

As there were no elections with a tied number of votes, all of the results from 10 June 2004 have followed, or will follow, the rule stated above.

== Election results ==
The candidate with the most votes polled who finished (1st) was elected for a term of 4 years.

The candidate who finished (2nd) was elected for a term of 3 years.

The candidate who finished (3rd) was elected for a term of 2 years.

As all 20 wards in Wolverhampton had to elect 3 councillors, this rule applied to all wards without exception.

It was the first election stood within by Warinder Juss, who finished 6th place in Penn ward with 1,135 votes. He was later elected Member of Parliament for the Wolverhampton West constituency at the 2024 general election.

== Ward results ==
Bilston East
Party	Candidate	Votes	%	±%
Labour	Thomas Turner (1st)	1321		
Labour	Louise Miles (2nd)	1291		
Labour	Stephen Simkins (3rd)	1255		
Conservative	Philip Lewis	675		
Conservative	Paul Myers	634		
Conservative	Robert Thomas	602		
Liberal Democrats	Michael Birch	445		
Turnout			26.38	

Bilston North
Party	Candidate	Votes	%	±%
Labour	Trudy Bowen (1st)	1375		
Labour	Susan Constable (2nd)	1206		
Labour	Philip Page (3rd)	1147		
Conservative	Gillian Fellows	1104		
Conservative	Marlene Berry	983		
Conservative	Christopher Haynes	887		
Green	Edward Clarke	505		
Liberal Democrats	Frances Heap	419		
Turnout			30.60	

Blakenhall
Party	Candidate	Votes	%	±%
Labour	John Rowley (1st)	2047		
Labour	Robert Jones (2nd)	1959		
Labour	Judith Rowley (3rd)	1877		
Conservative	Christopher Berry	581		
Conservative	Roberta Bradley	568		
Conservative	John Corns	482		
Liberal Democrats	Susan Butler	392		
Turnout			38.36	

Bushbury North
Party	Candidate	Votes	%	±%
Labour	Paula Brookfield (1st)	1331		
Conservative	Sheila Patten (2nd)	1293		
Labour	Paul Allen (3rd)	1279		
Conservative	Ian Lucas	1228		
Labour	Steven Edwards	1144		
Conservative	Martyn Griffiths	1079		
Liberal Democrats	Susan Bem	740		
Liberal Democrats	Ian Jenkins	591		
Liberal Democrats	Michael Ewing	528		
Turnout			35.39	

Bushbury South & Low Hill
Party	Candidate	Votes	%	±%
Labour	Peter Bilson (1st)	1088		
Labour	Peter O'Neill (2nd)	1084		
Labour	Paul Sweet (3rd)	1056		
Conservative	Margaret Findlay	539		
Conservative	James Wilson	519		
Conservative	Christine Lucas	513		
Liberal Democrats	Lionel Smith	292		
Liberal Democrats	Melonie Bryatt	270		
Liberal Democrats	Linda Gwinnett	266		
Turnout			21.80	

East Park
Party	Candidate	Votes	%	±%
Labour	Patricia Byrne (1st)	1253		
Labour	Francis Docherty (2nd)	1149		
Labour	Keith Inston (3rd)	1087		
UKIP	Anthony Foulkes	558		
Conservative	Peter Dobb	551		
Conservative	Jean Corns	522		
Conservative	Lee Patten	492		
Liberal Democrats	Ann Whitehouse	377		
Turnout			26.46	

Ettingshall
Party	Candidate	Votes	%	±%
Labour	Bishan Dass (1st)	1735		
Labour	Alan Smith (2nd)	1681		
Labour	Andrew Johnson (3rd)	1673		
Conservative	Robert Green	557		
Conservative	Arthur Mills	520		
Conservative	Lionel Berry	507		
Liberal Democrats	Eileen Birch	501		
Turnout			29.46	

Fallings Park
Party	Candidate	Votes	%	±%
Labour	Geoffrey Foster (1st)	1302		
Labour	Irene Griffiths (2nd)	1170		
Labour	Maureen Warren (3rd)	1078		
Conservative	Matthew Holdcroft	999		
Conservative	Alwyne Murray	942		
Conservative	Jonathan Evans	939		
Liberal Democrats	Joyce Hill	769		
Liberal Democrats	Sylvia Clark	684		
Liberal Democrats	Sandra Terry	603		
Turnout			33.53	

Graiseley
Party	Candidate	Votes	%	±%
Labour	John Reynolds (1st)	2078		
Labour	Elias Mattu (2nd)	1973		
Labour	Man Mohan Passi (3rd)	1886		
Conservative	John Mellor	1554		
Conservative	Barry Cole	1212		
Conservative	Jean Lenoir	1194		
Green	David Seagar	402		
Liberal Democrats	Mary Millar	383		
Liberal Democrats	David Harding	341		
Liberal Democrats	Sarah Vorley	319		
Turnout			45.75	

Heath Town
Party	Candidate	Votes	%	±%
Labour	Milkinderpal Jaspal (1st)	951		
Labour	Leslie Turner (2nd)	841		
Labour	Caroline Siarkiewicz (3rd)	776		
Liberal	Colin Hallmark	707		
Liberal	David Hallmark	597		
Liberal	Mark Smith	541		
Conservative	Pauline Griffiths	510		
Conservative	Gayna Gittos	443		
Conservative	Piers Thompson	427		
Turnout			26.71	

Merry Hill
Party	Candidate	Votes	%	±%
Conservative	Robert Hart (1st)	2128		
Conservative	David Nicholls (2nd)	2001		
Conservative	Christine Mills (3rd)	1933		
Labour	Clare Brittain	1021		
Labour	Howard Berry	988		
Labour	Ricky Chima	891		
Liberal Democrats	Jessica Pringle	520		
Liberal Democrats	Michael Rowan	519		
Liberal Democrats	Edward Pringle	516		
Turnout			39.34	

Oxley
Party	Candidate	Votes	%	±%
Labour	Christine Irvine (1st)	1302		
Labour	Ian Brookfield (2nd)	1257		
Labour	George Lockett (3rd)	1218		
Conservative	Leslie Pugh	871		
Conservative	Annette Pugh	866		
Conservative	Merisha Stevenson	750		
UKIP	Steven Wellings	490		
Liberal Democrats	Carole Jenkins	424		
Liberal Democrats	Robert Jukes	304		
Liberal Democrats	Tracey Jukes	289		
Turnout			28.88	

Park
Party	Candidate	Votes	%	±%
Labour	Jennifer Cromie (1st)	1493		
Labour	Sandra Samuels (2nd)	1433		
Labour	Manohar Minhas (3rd)	1423		
Conservative	Neville Patten	1176		
Conservative	Martin Berrington	1174		
Conservative	Lucinda Turner	1163		
Liberal Democrats	Robert Caddick	763		
Liberal Democrats	Bryan Lewis	725		
Liberal Democrats	John Steatham	725		
Turnout			40.67	

Penn
Party	Candidate	Votes	%	±%
Conservative	Patricia Bradley (1st)	2556		
Conservative	Alan Hart (2nd)	2457		
Conservative	Patricia Patten (3rd)	2300		
Labour	Ian Angus	1259		
Labour	Christine Hampton	1202		
Labour	Warinder Juss	1135		
Liberal Democrats	June Hemsley	633		
Liberal Democrats	Nichola Jack	511		
Liberal Democrats	Sameen Farouk	452		
Turnout			44.73	

Spring Vale
Party	Candidate	Votes	%	±%
Liberal Democrats	Richard Whitehouse (1st)	1879		
Liberal Democrats	Michael Heap (2nd)	1785		
Liberal Democrats	Malcolm Gwinnett (3rd)	1757		
Labour	Graham Childs	881		
Labour	John Thomas	853		
Labour	William Langford	801		
UKIP	John Burke	547		
Conservative	Amanda Proverbs	356		
Conservative	Brian Fellows	282		
Conservative	Sylvia Green	260		
Independent	Robert Whitehouse	246		
Turnout			38.24	

St Peters
Party	Candidate	Votes	%	±%
Labour	Roger Lawrence (1st)	1222		
Labour	Surjan Duhra (2nd)	1174		
Labour	Tersaim Singh (3rd)	1155		
Liberal Democrats	Alexandra Lawrence	655		
Liberal Democrats	David Jack	614		
Liberal Democrats	Robin Lawrence	574		
Conservative	Leslie Bouts	318		
Conservative	Sandra Newman	299		
Conservative	Garry Graham	281		
Green	Paul Armstrong	246		
Turnout			37.47	

Tettenhall Regis
Party	Candidate	Votes	%	±%
Conservative	John Davis (1st)	2247		
Conservative	Jonathan Yardley (2nd)	2175		
Conservative	Barry Findlay (3rd)	1992		
Labour	Elizabeth Edmundson	649		
UKIP	Gordon Smith	638		
Liberal Democrats	Roger Gray	571		
Labour	David Hartley	565		
Labour	Jane Whalen	531		
Liberal Democrats	Michael Harper-Dolejsek	492		
Liberal Democrats	Darcel Stewart	402		
Turnout			42.49	

Tettenhall Wightwick
Party	Candidate	Votes	%	±%
Conservative	Joan Stevenson (1st)	3055		
Conservative	Wendy Thompson (2nd)	3022		
Conservative	Andrew Wynne (3rd)	2972		
Labour	Graham Dodd	758		
Labour	Roger Edwards	753		
Labour	Malcolm Freeman	733		
Liberal Democrats	Philip Bennett	630		
Turnout			46.44	

Wednesfield North
Party	Candidate	Votes	%	±%
Labour	Philip Bateman (1st)	1732		
Labour	David Jones (2nd)	1521		
Conservative	Arthur Newman (3rd)	1400		
Labour	Gwendoline Stafford Good	1399		
Conservative	Carol Bourne	1345		
Conservative	David Bourne	1333		
Liberal Democrats	Stephen Birch	545		
Turnout			37.69	

Wednesfield South
Party	Candidate	Votes	%	±%
Conservative	Simon Jevon (1st)	1590		
Labour	Helen King (2nd)	1417		
Conservative	Fiona Latter (3rd)	1390		
Labour	Paul Kalinauckas	1373		
Conservative	Simon Tong	1338		
Labour	Michael Stafford Good	1245		
Liberal Democrats	Malcolm Jones	475		
Turnout			37.47	
