= Hatton, Derbyshire =

Village in Derbyshire, England

Coordinates: 52.867°N 1.680°W

Hatton
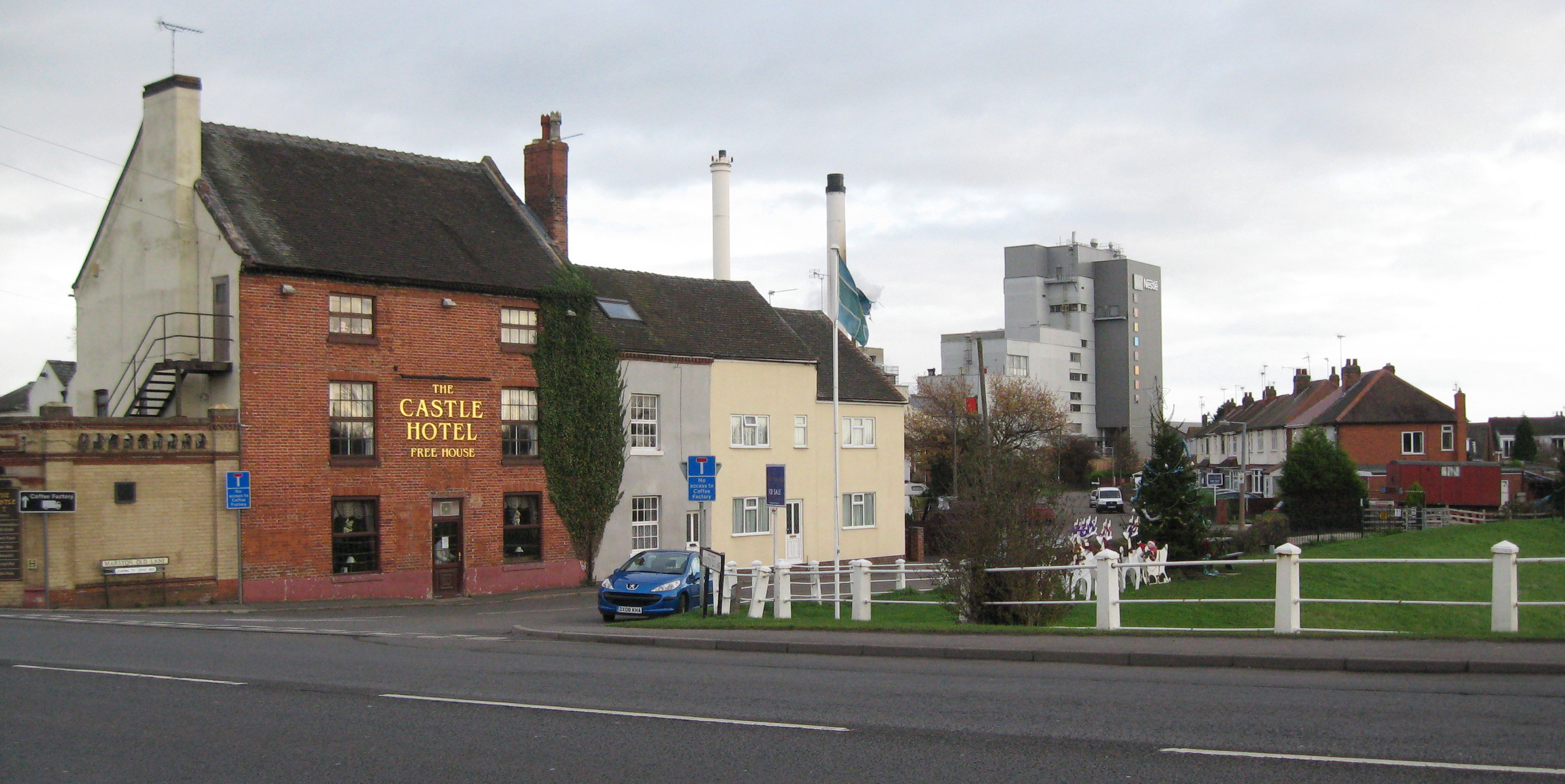
- Hatton and the Coffee Factory.

- Location within Derbyshire
- Population: 2,785 (2011)
- OS grid reference: SK215300
- District: South Derbyshire
- Shire county: Derbyshire
- Region: East Midlands
- Country: England
- Sovereign state: United Kingdom
- Post town: DERBY
- Postcode district: DE65
- Dialling code: 01283
- Police: Derbyshire
- Fire: Derbyshire
- Ambulance: East Midlands
- UK Parliament: Derbyshire Dales

Hatton is a village and civil parish in South Derbyshire, England. It is 5 miles (8.0 km) north of Burton upon Trent, 10 miles (16 km) south-west of Derby and 24 miles (39 km) south-east of Stoke-on-Trent. The population of the civil parish as of the 2011 census was 2,785. It adjoins Tutbury to the south.

== Geography ==
Hatton is about half a mile north of Tutbury, Staffordshire, with the River Dove running between the two villages and creating the county boundary; the river is crossed by a listed bridge. It has a population of 2,690 and is mainly residential.

The village is close to the A50 road which links the M1 and M6. The A50 used to pass across the northern edge of the village, but was bypassed in May 1995 by the 6-mile £19million Hatton, Hilton and Foston Bypass. The former route is now the A511, which passes through the village from Tutbury. Tutbury & Hatton railway station is on the Nottingham to Crewe line. Services are provided by East Midlands Railway. The station was originally closed in the Beeching cuts in the 1960s, but was re-opened in the 1980s (like other previously closed rural stations) because of public demand. Local bus services are provided by Diamond East Midlands who link Hatton with the market towns of Burton-upon-Trent and Uttoxeter, and Trentbarton who link with Derby and Burton-upon-Trent.

The village is within the district of South Derbyshire District Council and county of Derbyshire County Council. The local MP is Labour politician John Whitby, who was elected in 2024.

== Environment ==
Thistley Meadow community nature reserve is beside the River Dove. From this southern part of the village there are views across the river to Tutbury Castle. Towards the northern part of the village there is a good network of footpaths and bridleways that can be used to navigate round the village or as a link to the neighbouring villages of Hilton and Marston-on-Dove, or further into the less populated villages of South Derbyshire that link Hatton with the open farmland that reaches up towards Ashbourne and the Peak District National Park. Heathland and pasture are the dominant environmental features, contrasting with the residential and commercial aspects of the village.

== Economy ==
Local employers include Nestlé Tutbury who have a historical presence in the village because of the surrounding farmland, which supported a strong dairy farming industry, and proximity to rail transport. Nestlé's factory is labelled by the company as their Tutbury factory. Until the late 1970s the factory had its own private siding giving access to milk trains. The factory has since developed into a major coffee producer, the sole United Kingdom facility producing the Dolce Gusto range, and also Nescafé. During 2012 the company started to expand production and has made a multimillion-pound investment over the last few years to establish the site further.

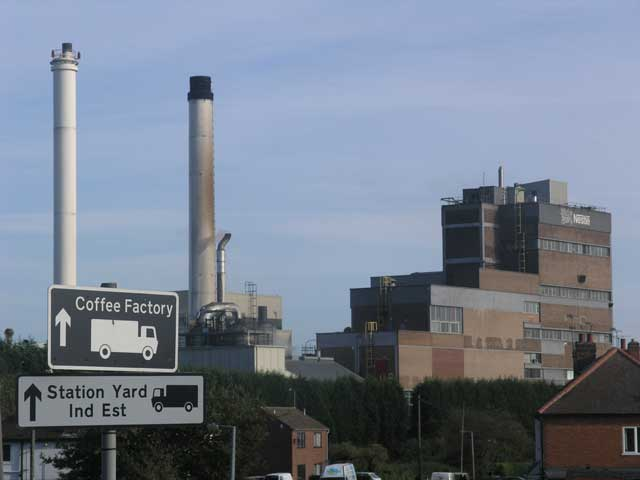
The Coffee Factory

There is a Co-op supermarket in the village, next to the railway station, as well as a post office, two newsagents and several other village shops and food outlets.

== History ==
Hatton was mentioned in the Domesday Book as belonging to Henry de Ferrers and being worth twenty shillings. The parish church is dedicated to All Saints.

It is estimated that in 1880 the village had around 500 residents. The population has since quintupled.

== Notable historical residents ==
- John Berry (1920–2010), designer of the Esso tiger in the 1950s, and many children's reference books for Ladybird Books.
- Roger Davies (born 1950), ex-Derby County footballer.
- Jody Bunting (born 1978), TV fitness expert from Channel 4's former morning show The Big Breakfast.

== See also ==
- Listed buildings in Hatton, Derbyshire
