= Alex Hughes (cartoonist) =

English cartoonist

- Born: 22 April 1971 (age 54); Solihull, West Midlands, England
- Known for: Cartooning
- Patrons: Tribune
- Website: www.alexhughescartoons.co.uk

Alex Hughes (born Solihull, 22 April 1971) is an English freelance cartoonist, caricaturist and illustrator, whose work is published in Tribune and has been used in PC Pro, Red Pepper and by the BBC's The Midlands at Westminster and Five's Live With Christian O'Connell. He lives in Smethwick, West Midlands, England.

Hughes has an MA in Visual Communications (cartooning) from UCE Birmingham and was Treasurer of the Professional Cartoonists' Organisation. He works from home, having formerly had a studio in Birmingham's Custard Factory.

== Publications ==
- Learn to Draw Caricatures HarperCollins, 1999, ISBN 0-00-413328-5
  - Le dessin de caricatures, 2007, ISBN 2-212-12129-6
- Drawing Cartoons John Byrne, Alex Hughes & Janet Nunn, Collins ISBN 0-00-714217-X

=== Contributions ===
- Drawing Cartoons That Sell, John Byrne, ISBN 0-00-710538-X
