= Sir Alfred Bird, 1st Baronet =

English chemist, food manufacturer and Conservative politician (1849 - 1922)

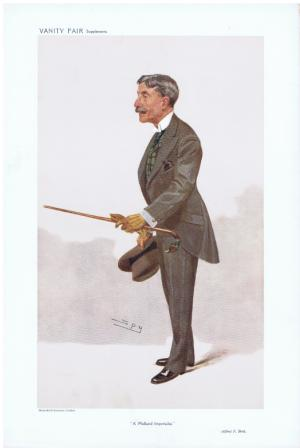
Caricature of Alfred Bird by "Spy" in Vanity Fair, 1908

Sir Alfred Frederick Bird, 1st Baronet (27 July 1849 – 7 February 1922) was an English chemist, food manufacturer and Conservative Party politician. He is best remembered as the proprietor of Alfred Bird & Sons, a company founded by his father Alfred Bird, the inventor of baking powder and the powdered custard that bears his name.

== Early life and career ==
Bird was born in Birmingham and educated at King Edward's School, Birmingham. In 1867 he joined his father's company. In 1878 he took full control of the company following the death of his father, and began an ambitious programme of modernisation and expansion. Bird also continued to innovate with new products such as a powdered egg substitute, jelly crystals and tablet jellies. In 1900 Alfred Bird & Sons Ltd became a public limited company.

Bird retired as chairman and managing director of the company in 1905. He stood unsuccessfully as the Unionist candidate on Wednesbury at the 1906 general election, and at the January 1910 general election he was elected as the Member of Parliament (MP) for Wolverhampton West, a seat which he held until his death. He was knighted in the 1920 New Year Honours for his services to the reorganisation of Overseas Officers' Clubs and to discharged servicemen and old age pensioners and created a baronet, of Solihull in the County of Warwick, in the 1922 New Year Honours for his patronage of art and for donating paintings to the Houses of Parliament. However, he died a few days after the Letters Patent were issued for his baronetcy.

== Death ==
Alfred Frederick Bird died on 7 February 1922, aged 72, shortly after being run over by a motorist in Piccadilly, London. He was succeeded in the baronetcy by his eldest son Robert, who also won the March 1922 by-election to succeed him as MP for Wolverhampton West.

== Acquisition ==
The company continued as a family-run business until 1947, when the American company General Foods Corporation acquired control of the company. Birds remains to this day a major food brand, although its products are no longer made in Birmingham. Premier Foods assumed ownership of the brand in the mid-2000s.

== Burial ==
Alfred Frederick Bird is interred in a large family vault within the grounds of Robin Hood Cemetery, Streetsbrook Road, Shirley, Solihull.

== Notes ==
Parliament of the United Kingdom
Preceded by Thomas Frederick Richards	Member of Parliament for Wolverhampton West; Jan. 1910–1922	Succeeded by Sir Robert Bird
Baronetage of the United Kingdom
New creation	Baronet (of Solihull); 1922	Succeeded by Robert Bird
