= Billy Hughes (educationist) =

British politician (1914–1995)

Herbert Delauney Hughes (7 September 1914 – 15 November 1995), known as Billy Hughes, was a British adult educationist and Labour Party politician. He was a member of parliament (MP) from 1945 to 1950 and principal of Ruskin College from 1950 to 1979.

== Career ==
His father Arthur was a secondary school teacher, and mother Maggie was a former elementary school headteacher who educated him at home until age eleven. Hughes had been born in Swindon, but moved with his parents to Bakewell, Derbyshire when he was six, where he attended Bakewell grammar school before becoming a boarder at Manchester Warehousemen's and Clerks' Orphans School at Cheadle Hulme, Cheshire. He won a scholarship to Balliol College, Oxford, where he graduated in 1935 with a degree in modern history, having been chair of the Oxford University Labour Club.

He started training as a schoolteacher at Manchester University, but left to work in London for the New Fabian Research Bureau (NFRB), which merged in 1938 with the Fabian Society, of which he became secretary. He was elected as a councillor on Lambeth borough council, and in 1937 he married (Winifred) Beryl Parker (died 1995), sister of Romford MP John Parker; they had no children.

During World War II he served with the Royal Artillery, and at the 1945 general election he was as Member of Parliament for Wolverhampton West, holding the seat until the constituency was abolished in 1950. At the 1950 general election, he stood in the new Wolverhampton South West constituency, but was defeated by the Conservative Party candidate Enoch Powell.

In the House of Commons, he spoke in 1945 about his fears of a nuclear arms race. He was parliamentary private secretary (PPS) to the Secretary of State for Education, Ellen Wilkinson, whose secretary from 1937 to 1941 had been his wife Beryl. After Wilkinson's death in 1947, he continued for a year as PPS to her successor George Tomlinson, before becoming PPS to War Office minister Michael Stewart.

== Ruskin College ==
Later that year, he was appointed as principal of Ruskin College, Oxford, an independent institution founded in 1899 to provide university standard education for working class adults with few or no qualifications so that they could act more effectively on behalf of working class communities and organisations, such as trade unions, political parties, co-operative societies and working men's institutes. As principal of Ruskin until his retirement in 1979, he presided over an expansion of the college's facilities and student numbers, and securing increased funding and eventually persuading the government to make it mandatory (rather than discretionary) for Local Education Authorities to provide grants to the college's students. It was while laying the foundation stone of the college's Steve Biko building in October 1976 that the prime minister, James Callaghan, launched what became known as a "great debate" on educational standards. Callaghan questioned "the new informal methods of teaching which seem to produce excellent results when they are in well-qualified hands but are much more dubious when they are not".

Hughes involvement in adult education extended beyond Ruskin and continued into his retirement. He was president of the Workers' Educational Association, served on the Russell committee on adult education (1969–73), chaired the Adult Literacy Resource Agency, and also served on the advisory council for adult and continuing education, the National Institute of Adult and Continuing Education, and the Civil Service Arbitration Tribunal.

He survived his wife by four months, and died at his home in Merton, Bicester, on 15 November 1995 aged 81.

== Publications ==
- Hughes, Herbert Delauney; Miller, G. D. (1947). Advance in Education. Labour Discussion Series. no. 15. London.
- Hughes, Herbert Delauney (1955). A Socialist Education Policy. Fabian Research Series, No. 173. London: Fabian Society.
- Hughes, Herbert Delauney (1947). Towards a Classless Society. Discussion Series. no. 3. London: Fabian Publications and Victor Gollancz.

== Notes ==
Parliament of the United Kingdom
Preceded by Sir Robert Bird, Bt.	Member of Parliament for Wolverhampton West; 1945–1950	Constituency abolished
Party political offices
Preceded by Eirene White	Chair of the Fabian Society; 1959 – 1960	Succeeded by Baron Faringdon
Preceded by John Parker	President of the Fabian Society; 1988 – 1993	Succeeded by Peter Archer
Academic offices
Preceded by Ellen McCullough	President of the Workers' Educational Association; 1971–1981	Succeeded by Bernard Jennings
