= 1922 Wolverhampton West by-election =

By-election to the British House of Commons

The 1922 Wolverhampton West by-election was a by-election held for the British House of Commons constituency of Wolverhampton West in Wolverhampton on 7 March 1922. It was won by the Coalition Conservative candidate Sir Robert Bird.

== Vacancy ==
The seat had become vacant on when the sitting Conservative Member of Parliament (MP), Sir Alfred Bird had died at the age of 72 on 7 February 1922. He had held the seat since the January 1910 general election.

== Candidates ==
The Conservative candidate was 45-year-old Sir Robert Bird, son of Sir Alfred. The Labour Party candidate was 49-year-old Alexander Walkden, who had contested the seat in 1918.

The Liberal Party, did not field a candidate at the last general election and decided not to do so again for the by-election. George Thorne, the Liberal MP for Wolverhampton East supported the Labour Party candidate.

== Result ==
On an increased turnout, the result was a victory for the Coalition Conservative candidate, Sir Robert Bird, although his majority was somewhat reduced from that won by his father in 1918. He held the seat until 1929, regained it in 1931, and stepped down at the 1945 general election.

Walkden stood again (unsuccessfully) at the November 1922 general election, and after contesting Heywood and Radcliffe in 1924, was elected as MP for Bristol South in 1929.

Wolverhampton West by-election, 1922
Party		Candidate	Votes	%	±%
C	Unionist	Robert Bird	16,790	54.9	−1.9
	Labour	Alexander Walkden	13,799	45.1	+1.9
Majority			2,991	9.8	−3.8
Turnout			30,589	80.0	+16.7
	Unionist hold		Swing	−1.9	
C indicates candidate endorsed by the coalition government.

== Previous result ==
General election 1918: Wolverhampton West
Party		Candidate	Votes	%	±%
C	Unionist	Alfred Bird	13,329	58.8	
	Labour	Alexander Walkden	10,158	42.2	
Majority			3,171	13.6	
Turnout			23,487	63.3	
	Unionist hold		Swing		
C indicates candidate endorsed by the coalition government.

== See also ==
- Wolverhampton West (UK Parliament constituency)
- Wolverhampton
- Lists of United Kingdom by-elections

== Sources ==
- Craig, F. W. S. (1983) [1969]. British parliamentary election results 1918-1949 (3rd ed.). Chichester: Parliamentary Research Services. ISBN 0-900178-06-X.
- Historical list of MPs: W
