= Listed buildings in Hatton, Derbyshire =

Hatton is a civil parish in the South Derbyshire district of Derbyshire, England. The parish contains four listed buildings that are recorded in the National Heritage List for England. All the listed buildings are designated at Grade II, the lowest of the three grades, which is applied to "buildings of national importance and special interest". The parish contains the village of Hatton and the surrounding area. The listed buildings consist of a timber framed cottage, a cottage with an attached barn, a bridge, and a railway signal box.

== Buildings ==
Name and location	Photograph	Date	Notes
39 Uttoxeter Road; 52.87505°N 1.69012°W	—	Mid 17th century	A pair of cottages, later combined, they are timber framed with rendered brick infill and a tile roof. The south and west walls have been rebuilt in brick. There are two storeys and three irregular bays. On the front is a porch and a lean-to, there is a small-pane window, and the other windows are casements.
Rose Cottage and barn 52.87892°N 1.68615°W	—	Early 18th century	The cottage and barn are in red brick on a chamfered plinth, with stone dressings, and a tile roof with coped gables and plain kneelers. The cottage has a floor band, a dentilled eaves cornice, two storeys and two bays. In the centre is a blocked doorway with a keystone, and to its left is a later doorway. The windows are casements, in the ground floor they have gauged brick heads and keystones, and in the upper floor they have flat heads. The barn is attached on the left, and inside the cottage is an inglenook fireplace.
Tutbury Bridge; 52.86286°N 1.68283°W		1815–17	The bridge carries Bridge Street (A511 road) over the River Dove. It is in rusticated sandstone, and consists of five depressed segmental arches. The piers have round-arched niches and short curved cutwaters, and above is a string course and a coped parapet. The walls curve outwards at each end.
Tutbury Crossing Signal Box; 52.86418°N 1.68207°W		1872	The signal box was built by the North Staffordshire Railway. It is in red brick with weatherboarding around the windows in the upper floor, and has a hipped slate roof. In the ground floor are windows with segmental brick arches, and the upper floor is accessed by external steel steps. Inside is a signal frame that was installed in 1897.
