= William Chichele Plowden =

Member of Legislative Council of India

Sir William Chichele Plowden
- Born: 1832
- Died: 4 September 1915 (aged 82–83)
- Occupations: Civil Servant and Member of the Legislative Council in India

Sir William Chichele Plowden KCSI (1832 – 4 September 1915) was a Civil Servant and Member of the Legislative Council in India, and subsequently a Liberal politician who sat in the House of Commons from 1886 to 1892.

== Early life and education ==
William Chichele Plowden was born in 1832, to William Plowden FRS MP of Ewhurst Park and his wife Jane Annette Campbell, daughter of Edward Campbell. He was educated at Harrow School and Haileybury College.

== Career ==
Plowden arrived in India in 1852. He was in the Bengal Civil Service as Census Commissioner for India and Secretary of the Board of Revenue of the North West Provinces. He was also a member of the Legislative Council in Calcutta.

== Later life ==
Plowden retired in 1885.

In 1886, he was knighted as KCSI.

In the 1886 general election, Plowden was elected Member of Parliament (MP) for Wolverhampton West and held the seat until 1892.

== Family ==
Plowden married Emily Frances Ann Bass (1841–1915), the eldest daughter of Michael Thomas Bass Jr., MP for Derby and his wife, Eliza Jane Arden. Emily was the sister of Lord Burton and Hamar Alfred Bass. The Plowdens lived at Aston Rowant House, Oxfordshire, and at 5 Park Crescent, Portland Place. They had a daughter, Margaret who married Hubert Mostyn, 7th Lord Vaux.

== Publications ==
- "Report on the census of British India, taken on the 17th February 1881". www.librarysearch.manchester.ac.uk. Eyre and Spottiswoode. 1883.

Parliament of the United Kingdom
Preceded by Alfred Hickman	Member of Parliament for Wolverhampton West; 1886–1892	Succeeded by Sir Alfred Hickman
