= Punch Records =

- Industry: Music
- Founded: 1997
- Founder: Ammo Talwar
- Headquarters: Birmingham, United Kingdom

Punch Records is a Birmingham-based music and arts agency which offers tours, festivals, international projects and educational and outreach programs for young people.

== History ==
Punch Records was founded in the Perry Barr area of Birmingham in 1997 by Ammo Talwar. The organization began as an urban music record store, as well as a place where underground DJs from the West Midlands could demonstrate and grow their mixing and rapping abilities.

Punch Records began to host development events for young people to develop Punch Records' famed outreach programme, used by local schools. From this, Birmingham City Council became involved and now regularly programmes events through Punch Records which have included a roadshow in Centenary Square during Birmingham's European Capital of Culture 2008 bid.

In 2002, the success of the record shop led Ammo to relocate to Birmingham's Creative Quarter, the Custard Factory complex in Digbeth where the company now runs rhythm, song writing, music production, poetry, lyrics, dance, street art, photography and percussion lessons for the local community, schools and youth centers.

In 2003, Punch Records produced a film called Preskool, an "insightful short documentary that gives viewers an insight into Birmingham's local legends of Hip-Hop & Reggae music through the 70's and 80's."

Punch Records now collaborates with companies such as Artfest, the BBC, BMG, OOM Gallery, Sony, Urban Music Seminar and Warners.

Ammo Talwar was appointed a Member of the Order of the British Empire (MBE) in the 2008 New Year Honours for his contribution to music and young people in the West Midlands.
