= Gold Blend couple =

British television advertising campaign

The Gold Blend couple was a British television advertising campaign for Nescafé Gold Blend instant coffee, developed by McCann Erickson which ran from 1987 to 1993.

== Background ==
The original campaign ran for twelve 45-second instalments between 1987 and 1993. It starred Anthony Head and Sharon Maughan as Tony and Sharon, a couple who begin a slow-burning romance over a cup of the advertised coffee. The ads were in a serial format, with each ending with a cliffhanger. The commercials were popular, and as time went on, the appearance of a new installment gained considerable media attention. They are one of the most famous examples of serialised advertising.

Beginning in 1990, new versions of the ads were produced for the American market, where Gold Blend was called Taster's Choice, and the ads were referred to as the Taster's Choice saga. Head and Maughan reprised their roles (Tony being renamed Michael), but used American accents in the re-shot ads. After the first two nearly identical ads, the American ads diverged into their own storyline.

The campaign was a success, producing various tie-in products, including a novelisation entitled Love Over Gold by Susan Moody, a video compilation of the ads, and two music CDs. The ads had a notable effect on sales, increasing them by over 50% in the UK alone. They have been heralded as a premier example of positioning, creating an atmosphere of sophistication, while remaining relatable. They were frequently compared to a soap opera, even sometimes favourably compared to their contemporaries, such as Dynasty, Moonlighting, or Thirtysomething. Famously, Head and Maughan appeared on the cover of The Sun newspaper after their campaign concluded and the two characters confessed their love for each other.

In 1993 the commercials were spoofed in a two-part episode of the ABC sitcom Coach. In it, the coffee brand was "Drewers", and the commercials used the tagline "Say yes to Drewers, and see what happens next".

In later years, there were two additional series of ads starring new couples. The second series starred Louise Hunt and Mark Aiken and focused on a younger, more career-oriented woman, running for six instalments until 1997. In 1998 a new version, with Simone Bendix and Neil Roberts, began but the campaign was discontinued after only one ad.

In 2005 the campaign ranked at number 20 on ITV's Best Ever Ads. It had ranked at number 31 in a similar list compiled in 2000 aired on Channel 4.

== See also ==
- Bisto – television advertising for Bisto
- Oxo – television advertising for Oxo
- Nestlé Tutbury

== Other sources ==
- Vera, Betsy (2001-04-01). "Gold Blend/Taster's Choice". Archived from the original on 2008-06-18.
- Cashmore, Ernest (1994). And There Was Television. Taylor & Francis. pp. 75–76. ISBN 9780415091305.
- Werder, Olaf (2007). "Brewing Romance: The Romantic Fantasy Theme of the Taster's Choice "Couple" Advertising Campaign". In Galician, Mary-Lou; Merskin, Debra L. (eds.). Critical Thinking About Sex, Love, and Romance in the Mass Media: Media Literacy Applications. Psychology Press. pp. 35–37. ISBN 9780805856156.
- Bentley, Stephanie (1998). "Nestle scraps Gold Blend couple ads". Marketing Week.
- Kramer, Bernice (1991). "Tune In Tomorrow". New York. 24 (42). New York Media, LLC: 14–19.
- "The power of love: A Nestlé case study". The Times 100.
- Christian, Klaus Fog; Budtz, Phillip Munch (2010). Storytelling: Branding In Practice. Springer. pp. 165–166. ISBN 9783540883494.
- O'Shaughnessy, Nicholas J.; O'Shaughnessy, John (2004). Persuasion in Advertising. Psychology Press. pp. 160–161. ISBN 9780415322249.
- Elliot, Richard H.; Percy, Larry (2007). Strategic Brand Management. Oxford University Press. pp. 55–57. ISBN 9780199260003.
