= Nestlé Tutbury =

Coffee factory in derbyshire

- Tutbury Factory
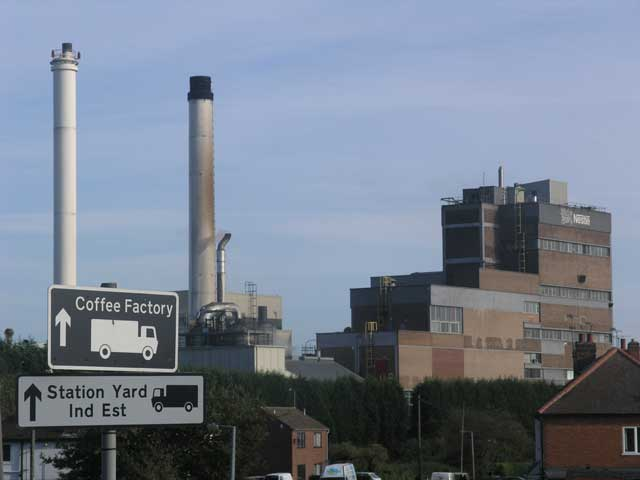
- Factory in April 2008

- Location within Derbyshire

General information
- Type: Coffee factory
- Location: Derbyshire
- Coordinates: 52.865°N 1.68°W
- Elevation: 55 m (180 ft)
- Completed: 1959
- Inaugurated: 9 June 1959
- Renovated: 2016
- Client: Nestlé
- Owner: Nestlé

Nestlé Tutbury is a large coffee factory in Derbyshire. It is the longest running Nestlé factory in the world, outside of Switzerland.

Nestlé is the world's largest food and drink company. The site is not actually in Tutbury, which is Staffordshire, but Hatton, Derbyshire just across the railway line that separates the two counties.

== History ==
Under a former company, the first Nestlé factory in the UK opened on New Road in Aylesbury in September 1870, which made condensed milk; With another at Middlewich in Cheshire in 1873. The company also had two sites in Switzerland, and another at Lindau in Bavaria in Germany. The Aylesbury Vale was a known dairy region. In Wiltshire, Nestlé opened another creamery in Chippenham in 1877, and Staverton Mill in 1897. All of these creameries were built directly next to railway lines. The Aylesbury site closed around 2002, largely making packet soups under the Maggi name.

Tutbury was built in 1901 after the site in Staverton. It took the Nestlé name in 1905. It was built in Repton Rural District. It was the fourth Nestlé factory in the UK. Edouard Dommen, a Swiss mechanical engineer, founded the site. He retired in 1936 and returned to Switzerland.

It made powdered milk during World War II.

=== New buildings ===
The new buildings opened on 9 June 1959. Ovens were made by Probat in Emmerich am Rhein, on the Dutch border, on the western edge of Germany.

In 1965 residents sent a petition to Repton Rural District Council, complaining about the aroma of roasting coffee.

In 1980 due to a slump in summer sales, workers were put on a three day week.

In the early 1980s, the residents of Hatton were displeased at the noise from the factory. Steam expulsions happened every 20 minutes, throughout the night.

Nestle updated the factory in 1990, with a £5.5m investment, replacing the outdated machinery, to open in 1991. The £7m new roaster plant opened in early 1993, with a £7m extractor plant being built.

=== New units ===
John Sisk and Sons, with contractor O’Brien Contractors built a £360 million plant over 61 weeks to make a 30-acre site. The new Gusto plant would open in late 2014, cost and £110m. The architect was Darnton EGS, the structural engineer was WSP. It was designed in Navisworks and Autodesk Revit, with 4Projects project planning software. DB3 was an architect. PCS were the structural engineers, and PCS of Derbyshire installed 325 WiFi nodes. StudioDH was another architect.

In 2015 a new biomass energy centre opened.

=== Employees ===
Nestlé moved its regional office staff from West Bridgford to the Tutbury factory in October 1976.

On Friday 12 September 1980 at 4.25pm, 30 year old worker Noel Dolan, of Bournville, fell 30ft to his death, when demolishing a boiler.

The local Tutbury fire station, of Staffordshire Fire and Rescue Service, has staff from the factory.

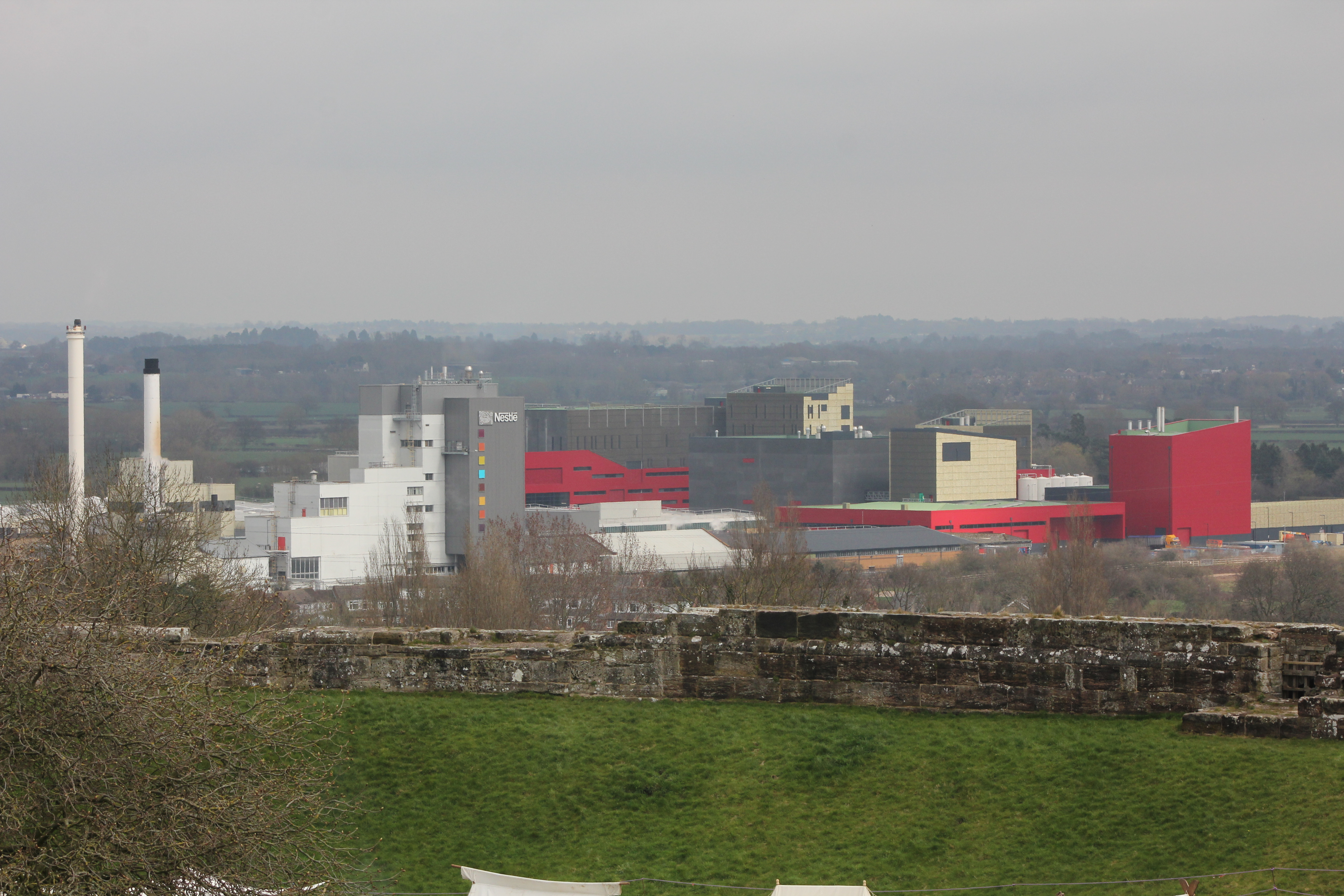
Seen in April 2015

=== Coffee production ===
In the 1970s Nestlé had around 50% of the UK coffee production. Nestlé introduced instant coffee to the UK in 1939. Until the late 1980s, most instant coffee in the UK was made with Robusta coffee, and the spray drying process.

In 1984 it was making 44% of the coffee drunk in the UK, and made Nesquik. In 1994 it produced enough for around 45 billion cups of coffee. In 2000, Nestlé had a 56% share of the UK's £650m coffee production.

Nestlé España have Nestlé's largest European coffee factory in Girona (Gerona) in the east of Spain, near the French border.

All of Nestlé's UK and Ireland coffee production was moved to the site in 2014, increasing 400 jobs.

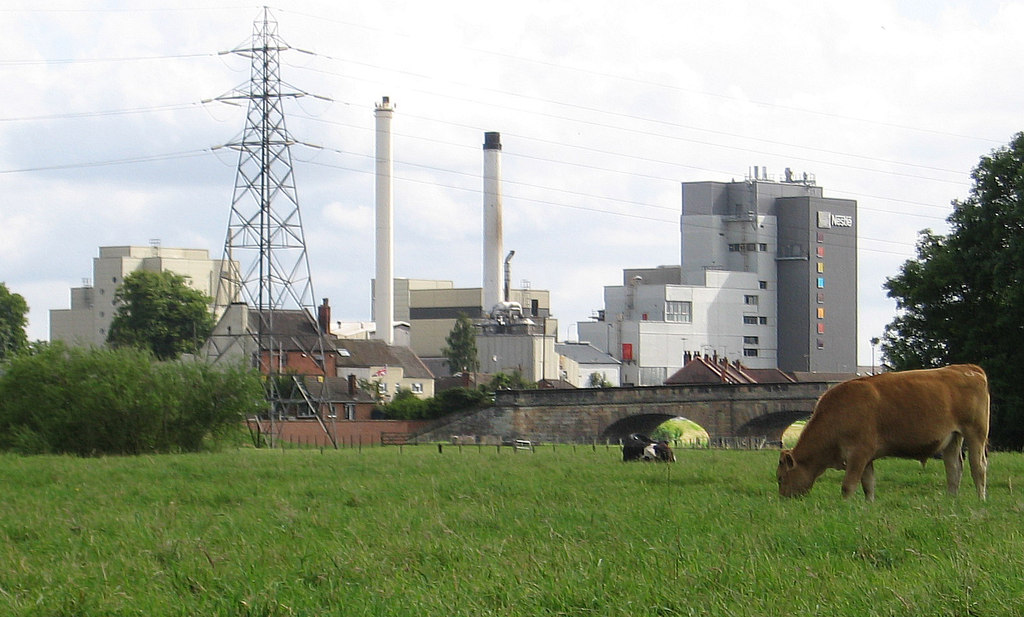
Seen in August 2012

=== Visits ===
- Prime Minister David Cameron visited the factory on Thursday 24 November 2011, when the site was given £110m of investment.
- The site was featured on an hour-long BBC Two documentary about coffee production on Tuesday 17 July 2018.

== Structure ==
The site has around 1000 employees.

=== Site production ===
It makes around 175,000 jars of coffee a day. It makes around 35,000 tonnes of coffee a year for the UK and Ireland.

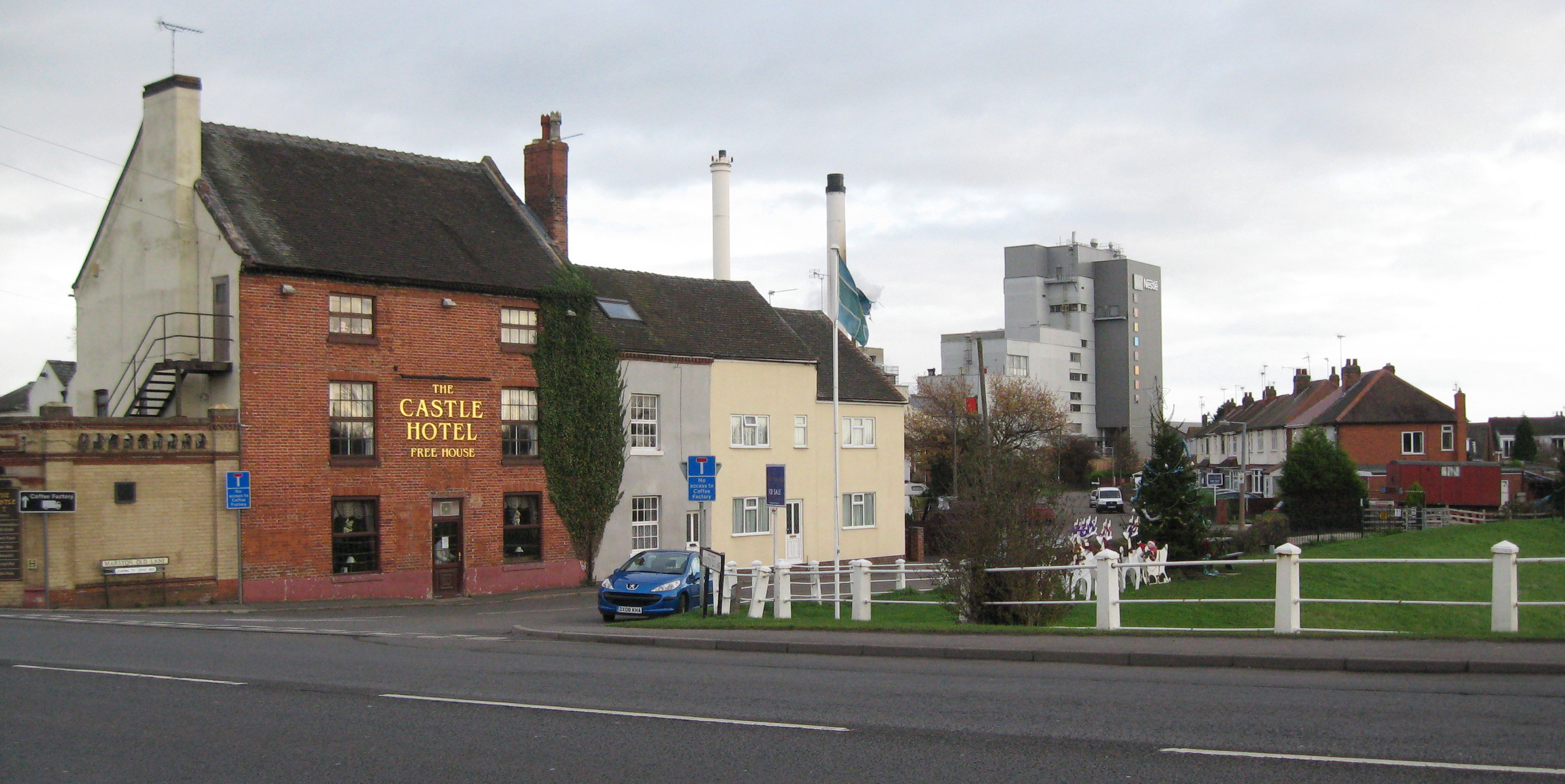
Seen in December 2011

== See also ==
- Gold Blend couple
- List of countries by coffee production
- Nestlé Dalton, since 1992 has made packets of coffee mixes, and Coffee Mate, on the B5299 south of Carlisle; the factory opened in 1962
- Jacobs Douwe Egberts factory in Banbury, since 2015 owned by JDE Peet's, made Kenco until around 2023
- Chirk Factory in Chirk in north Wales, opened in 1969 by Cadbury-Schweppes, which first made Cadbury drinking chocolate, and does today, and Knighton Factory in Knighton, Stafford, west Staffordshire, another former Cadbury factory, which made Bournvita
