= Custard powder =

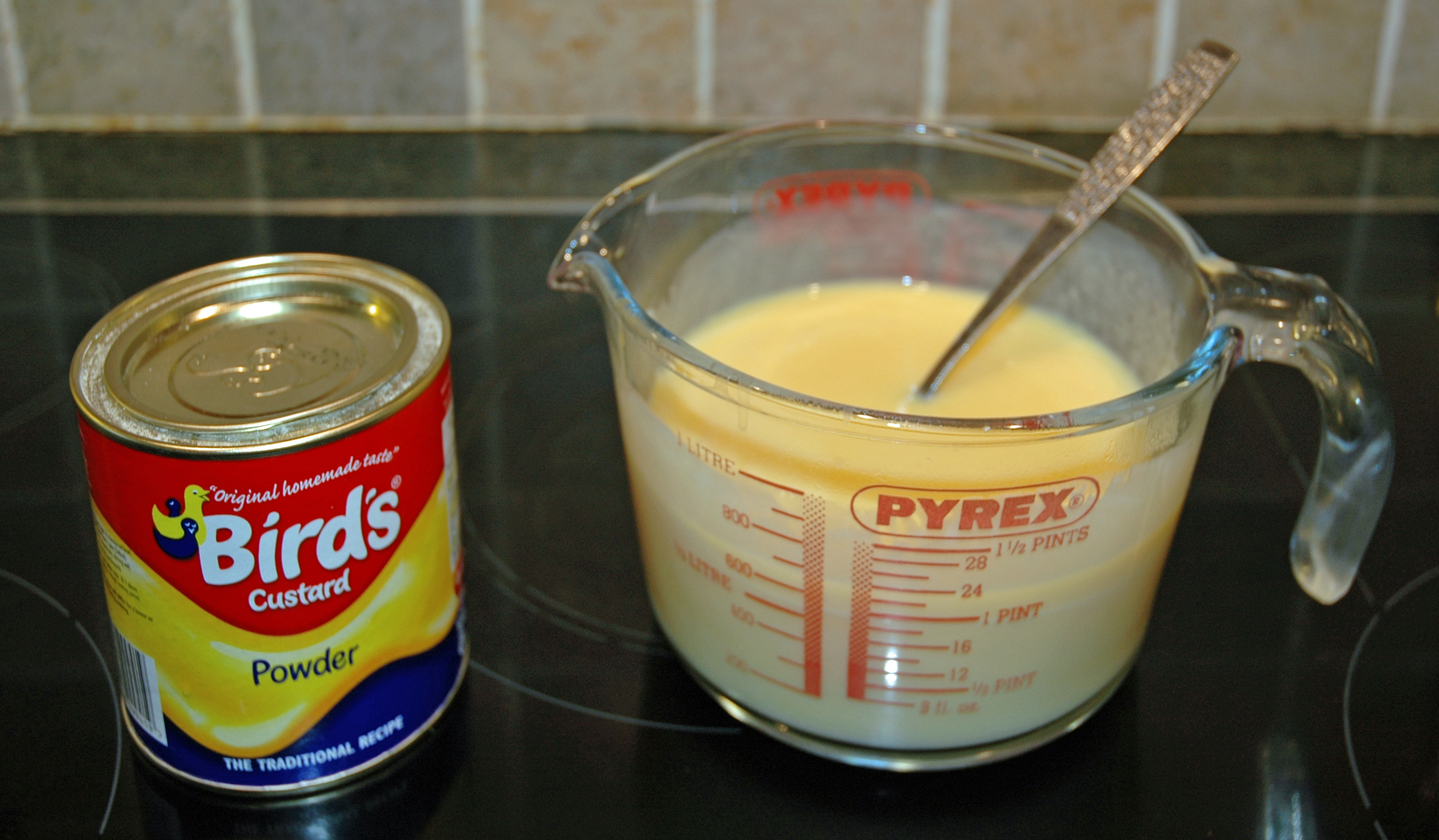
A tin of Bird's Custard powder and prepared custard in a measuring jug

Custard powder is a product that is converted to custard with the addition of water, milk and heat.

== History ==
Custard powder was invented in 1837 by Alfred Bird for his wife, who enjoyed consuming custard but was allergic to eggs. His product became known as Bird's Custard.

== Usage ==
When water, milk and heat is added to custard powder, it becomes custard. Some custard powders require the addition of sugar. Custard powder is made from cornflour, salt, flavouring and colouring. Some custard powders include egg, minerals and vitamins, while others do not. The cornflour acts as a thickening agent.

According to BBC News, custard powder is a common kitchen staple.

Custard powder is sometimes used as flavouring without being converted to custard, such as in some recipes for nanaimo bars.

== Reception ==
Writing for Stuff, Ewan Sargent has said that "There is no point making custard with custard powder when custard from a carton or bottle at the supermarket tastes so right."

Custard powder is similar to instant pudding.

== See also ==
- Powdered eggs
- Powdered milk
