= Warinder Juss =

British politician

Warinder Juss MP
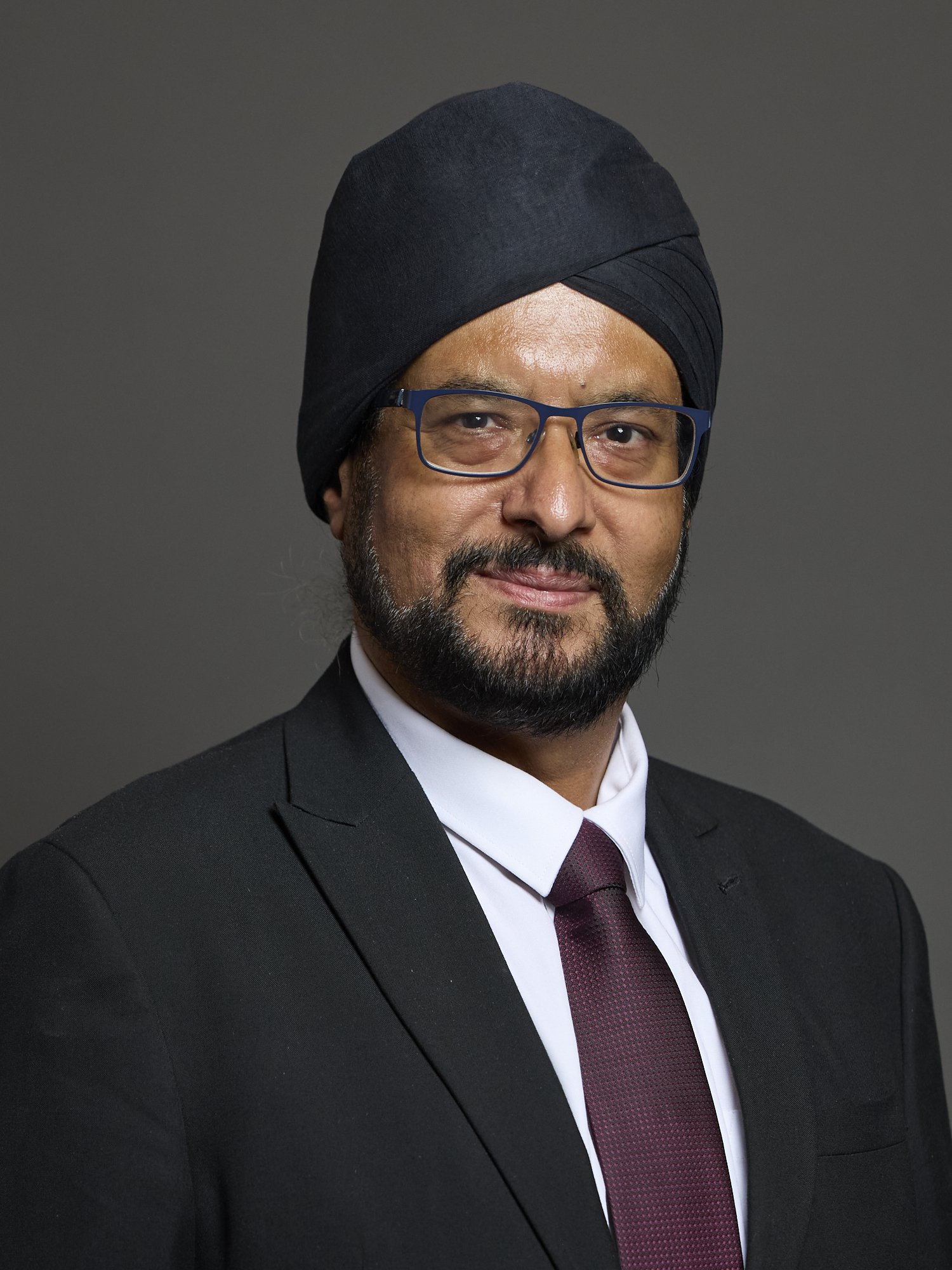
- Official portrait, 2024

Member of Parliament for Wolverhampton West
- Incumbent
- Assumed office 4 July 2024
- Preceded by: Seat re-established
- Majority: 7,868 (18%)

Personal details
- Born: East Africa
- Party: Labour
- Children: 2
- Occupation: Politician; landlord; solicitor

Warinder Singh Juss is a British politician and solicitor who has served as the Member of Parliament (MP) for Wolverhampton West since July 2024. A member of the Labour Party, he gained the seat in the newly re-established constituency.

== Early life ==
Juss was born in East Africa and moved to Wolverhampton in 1968. He attended local state schools and earned a law degree from the University of Wolverhampton.

== Career ==
Prior to entering politics, Juss worked as a solicitor at Thompsons Solicitors, where former Wolverhampton South West MP Rob Marris also worked. He also taught law at a further education college in Wolverhampton.

Juss has been active in the Labour Party for over 25 years, participating in every local and national election since 1997. He sits on the Central Executive Council of the GMB trade union, representing the Birmingham & West Midlands region in the National Race Reserved Seat.

Juss is a landlord.

Juss first stood for election for Labour in the 2004 Wolverhampton City Council election, in his home ward of Penn. He finished in 6th place with 1,135 votes, with all 3 seats up for election as a result of boundary changes.

Juss was selected as the Labour candidate for Wolverhampton West during the 2024 general election. The selection process was controversial, with Claire Darke MBE, a Wolverhampton Councillor, being excluded from the longlist. National Executive Committee member Mish Rahman, who is also a member of Momentum's National Co-ordinating Group, was also blocked from the longlist, leading to criticisms of the selection process.

Juss campaigned on a platform focusing on community issues, social justice, and supporting local services.

Juss won the Wolverhampton West seat with 19,331 votes (44.3% vote share), returning a majority of 7,868 votes. compared to a notional 2019 result of 23,542 votes (46.1% vote share), which would have resulted in a Conservative majority of 45.

In his maiden speech, Juss emphasised his commitment to preserving local landmarks, such as Banks's Brewery, and addressing community concerns.

== Political positions ==
Juss is a strong supporter of the NHS, social justice, and community welfare. He notably broke ranks with Labour leadership during his candidacy to call for an immediate ceasefire in the Gaza conflict.

Juss is a Labour MP, and on the vast majority of issues follows instructions from his party and votes the same way as other Labour MPs. He has never rebelled against his party during his time in the House of Commons.

Juss voted for the Terminally Ill Adults (End of Life) Bill.

== Personal life ==
Juss has two adult children. He is a Sikh, and actively participates in community and cultural activities, including playing the tabla at local events. He is also a supporter of his hometown football team Wolverhampton Wanderers FC.
