= Jody Bunting =

Fitness Presenter

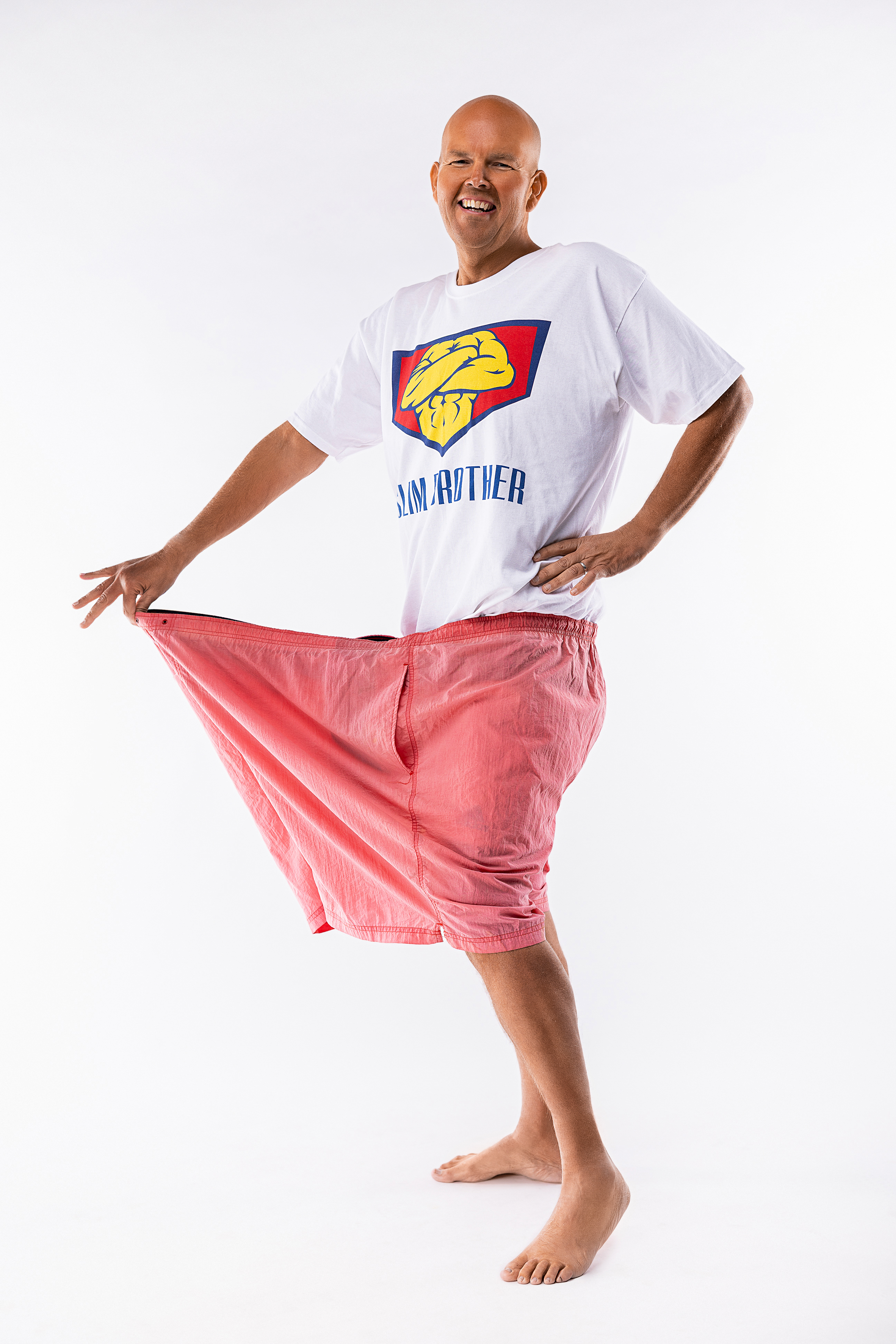
- Bunting in 2025 in his 2001 size 7XL swimming shorts
- Born: Jody Bunting; 27 January 1978 (age 48); Burton-on-Trent, Staffordshire, England
- Education: High Peak College, Buxton - University of Derby
- Occupations: Weight Loss Expert; Fitness Instructor; Holistic Lifestyle Coach
- Years active: 2000–present
- Organisation: Slim Brother
- Height: 6 ft 0.5 in (184 cm)
- Children: 1
- Awards: IFS Group Exercise Manager of the Year 2005
- Website: jodybunting.com

Jody Bunting (born 27 January 1978), is a fitness presenter who was the 31-stone (200kg) TV host of Lose it with Jody on Channel 4 television's former UK TV show The Big Breakfast between 2001 and 2002.

== Early life ==
Bunting was born on 27 January 1978 in Burton-on-Trent, Staffordshire, England. In 2000, he became father of a girl. One year later, he separated from the mother of his child.

== Career ==
In 2001, Bunting left his job at a call centre to pursue a full-time career in fitness instruction. That year, he featured on Channel 4's The Big Breakfast as the weekly guest fitness presenter which made him a public figure in the UK. Locally he continued to teach fitness classes and appeared in the line-up responsible for switching on the Burton-upon-Trent Christmas lights.

Between 2001 and 2004, Bunting lost approximately 19-stone, (275 pounds, 125 kg), and in 2004 underwent surgery to remove excess skin resulting from the weight loss. In 2005, he received the Group Exercise Manager of the Year award.

Bunting spend several years in Egypt from 2006 teaching fitness classes in 5 star holiday resorts abroad. His company, The Fat Factor, was featured on BBC’s The One Show in 2008. In 2009, he promoted the role of stress reduction in weight loss and launched relaxation classes in collaboration with Historian Lesley Smith. That same year, he participated in fundraising activities, including cycling in pink to support a breast cancer charity and abseiling down Derby Cathedral to raise money for the Derby Mountain Rescue Team.

In 2010, Bunting offered free community weight-loss courses in Derby, with several of his clients featured in local newspapers for their weight-loss achievements. In 2016, he launched free online weight-loss courses under the name Slim Brother, alongside in-person classes in Derby and Burton-upon-Trent. At that time, he stated that during his 15-year career in the fitness industry he had helped more than 5,000 people lose weight and had taught over 78,000 hours of fitness classes.

Bunting presented the talent show Sharm’s Got Talent in Sharm el-Sheikh, Egypt, in 2017. In a 2018 YouTube video, he spoke publicly for the first time about being homosexual and became a supporter of Derbyshire LGBTQ+ Pride, stating that he had known he was gay since the age of 13. After working for the Weight Watchers slimming groups for a year, he parted company with them, relaunched his Slim Brother weight loss programme in 2019. In 2021, Aldi UK hired Bunting to taste-test its Easter chocolate egg range and featured in several adverts.

In 2024, Bunting made headlines globally due to a highly unusual legal investigation involving a chocolate bar at a gym where he worked at. The high-profile case concluded in April 2025, when Derbyshire Police officially dropped all charges and closed the investigation.

== Filmography ==
| Year | Title | Role | Notes |
|---|---|---|---|
| 2000 | ITV's The Trisha Goddard Show | Guest | "Is fat sexy" Episode |
| 2001-2002 | Channel 4's The Big Breakfast | Diet & Fitness Expert | 40 Episodes |
| 2001-2003 | Ram FM | Outside Broadcaster | 500+ Shows |
| 2002 | Sky's Lorraine | Weight Loss Expert | Guest Expert |
| 2003 | BBC's SAS: Are You Tough Enough | Weight Loss Expert | Celebrity Contestant |
| 2003 | Channel 4's The Fit Farm | Diet & Fitness Expert | Teaching the guests how to pole dance |
| 2003 | Channel 4's The Salon | Fitness Instructor | Colonic Irrigation Patient |
| 2003 | ITV's The Jeremy Kyle Show | Weight Loss Expert | "Lose weight or die" Episode |
| 2008 | BBC's The One Show | Weight Loss Expert | The Fat Factor auditions |
| 2017 | ITV's This Morning | Fitness Instructor | Holidays in Sharm el-Sheikh, Egypt |
| 2021 | Aldi UK Social Media | Taste Tester | New Easter Chocolate Egg Range |
| 2023 | GB News Channel | Obesity Expert | Should Obesity Be Normalised? |
