= Fused Magazine =

- Editors: Kerry O'Coy, David O'Coy
- Categories: Travel, Art, Design, Culture
- Frequency: Bi-annual
- Circulation: 20,000
- Publisher: Fused Media Partnership
- First issue: 2000
- Company: Fused Media
- Country: United Kingdom
- Language: English
- Website: www.fusedmagazine.com

Fused Magazine is a travel, culture and design magazine based in the West Midlands, England and distributed throughout the world.

The magazine was founded by editors David and Kerry O'Coy in 2000. It is published twice a year and distributed via Boutique Mags. The magazine is distributed internationally and sold in shops, independent stores and galleries around the UK, Europe, North America, Asia and Australia.

Although based in the Midlands, its editorial coverage is national and international.

In 2009 Fused launched Area Culture Guide, a monthly pocket-sized cultural events guide covering the West Midlands. In 2010 Fused co-produced a magazine on behalf of Arts & Business for The Art of Ideas 2010.

Fused also curated the visual pop-culture event ‘EYE CANDY‘, selecting exhibitors, speakers and designers to showcase illustration, art and design through a programme of events, exhibitions, meet-ups, a talks program and creative workshops.
