= Alfred Bird =

English food manufacturer and chemist

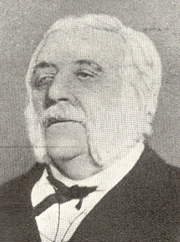
- Born: 1811; Nympsfield, Gloucestershire, England
- Died: 15 December 1878; Kings Norton, Birmingham, England
- Resting place: Key Hill Cemetery, Birmingham, England
- Known for: Inventing egg-free custard and baking powder
- Children: Son: Alfred Frederick Bird

Alfred Bird (1811 – 15 December 1878) was an English food manufacturer and chemist. He was born in Nympsfield, Gloucestershire, England in 1811 and was later a pupil at King Edward's School, Birmingham. He was the inventor of a series of food products, most notably egg-free custard and baking powder. His father was a lecturer in astronomy at Eton College. His son Alfred Frederick Bird continued to develop the business after his father's death.

== Career ==
Alfred Bird served a pharmacist apprenticeship to Philip Harris Ltd. in Birmingham. Bird became a qualified chemist and druggist.

In 1837, Bird opened a shop in Bull Street, Birmingham, Alfred Bird, experimental chemist.

In 1837, Bird's first major invention was egg-free custard. Alfred Bird used cornflour instead of egg to create an imitation of egg custard. It was originally intended only for his wife Elizabeth who had both egg and yeast allergies. The Birds used genuine custard when entertaining guests, but on one occasion the egg-free custard was (either by accident or design) fed to dinner guests. It was well received, and Alfred Bird realised that his invention had a wider use. Soon afterwards Alfred Bird founded 'Alfred Bird and Sons Ltd', which would go on to become the famous Bird's Custard company and brand.

In 1842, Bird registered as a pharmacist in Birmingham.

In 1843, Bird invented Bird's Fermenting Powder, a baking powder, to make yeast-free bread for his wife. This formula for baking powder is similar to modern baking powders.

== Death ==
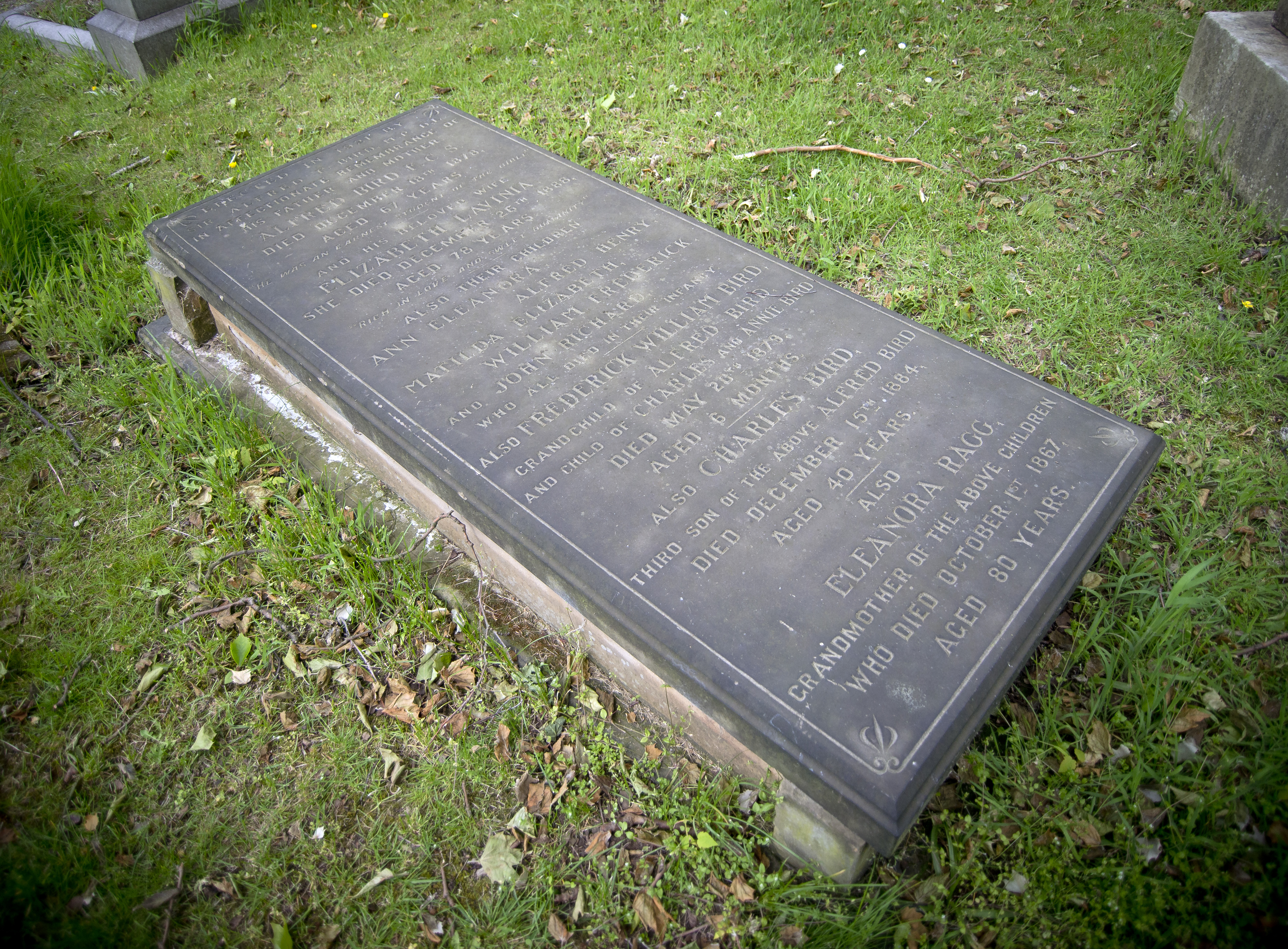
Alfred Bird's gravestone at Key Hill Cemetery, Birmingham

Alfred Bird died on 15 December 1878 in Kings Norton, Birmingham and is buried at Key Hill Cemetery in Birmingham. Famously his obituary in the journal of the Chemical Society (of which he was a fellow) discussed at length his skills and research but did not mention his other activity – the by then famous Bird's Custard and Bird's Jelly. It read:

Mr. ALFRED BIRD was born in 1811, his father, Mr. John Bird, being lecturer on astronomy at Eton College. In addition to practising as an analytical and consulting chemist at Birmingham, he devoted considerable attention to physics and meteorology. In the course of his investigations into the laws of sound, he constructed a beautiful set of harmonized glass bowls, extending over five octaves, which he used to play with much skill. In meteorology he devised a plan of demonstrating experimentally that the wind blows in circles. He also, in 1859, constructed a water barometer, a description of which is published in the Phil. Mag. for 1865, and which is still in perfect working order. With this he was fond of observing and showing to others the minute oscillations of the atmospheric pressure. He was well known for his originality and as the inventor of several useful appliances.

== Personal life ==
His son, Alfred Frederick Bird, continued the work of his father. Bird junior went on to invent egg substitute powder in 1890, blancmange powder and jelly powder.

The Custard Factory in Digbeth, Birmingham, is now a centre providing space to artists.

== See also ==
- Henry Jones, a Bristol baker who patented self-raising flour in 1845, as a means of providing fresh bread on ships.
- Eben Norton Horsford, the Rumford Professor at Harvard, who received an American patent in 1856, for monocalcium phosphate, for baking powder
- August Oetker, German populariser of baking powder in 1891
