= Wolverhampton West (constituency) =

UK Parliament constituency (1885–1950, 2024 onwards)

- Borough constituency for the House of Commons
- Boundary of Wolverhampton West in West Midlands region
- County: West Midlands county

Current constituency
- Created: 2024
- Member of Parliament: Warinder Juss (Labour)
- Seats: one
- Created from: Wolverhampton South West

1885–1950
- Created from: Wolverhampton
- Replaced by: Wolverhampton North East and Wolverhampton South West

Wolverhampton West is a borough constituency in the city of Wolverhampton in the West Midlands of England which was re-established for the 2024 general election following the 2023 Periodic Review of Westminster constituencies and which is formed largely from the former Wolverhampton South West constituency. It has been represented in the House of Commons since 2024 by Warinder Juss.

== Boundaries ==
=== 1885–1918 ===
The original boundaries of the constituency were set in the sixth schedule of the Redistribution of Seats Act 1885. The seat comprised five wards of the municipal borough of Wolverhampton (St. Mark's, St. Paul's, St. John's, St. George's and St. Matthew's) and the neighbouring Ettingshall area which lay outside the borough boundaries.

=== 1918–1950 ===
Constituencies throughout Great Britain and Ireland were redrawn by the Representation of the People Act 1918. Wolverhampton's municipal boundaries had been enlarged and it had become a county borough in the period since 1885. The Wolverhampton West seat was redefined to reflect this, and was described as comprising nine wards of the county borough: Blakenhall, Dunstall, Graiseley, Merridale, Park, St. George's, St. John's, St. Mark's and St. Matthew's.

=== 2024–present ===
Further to the 2023 periodic review of Westminster constituencies, which was based on the ward structure in place on 1 December 2020, and taking into account the local government boundary review in the City of Wolverhampton which came into effect in May 2023, the re-established constituency comprises the following from the 2024 general election:

- The City of Wolverhampton wards of: Blakenhall; Graiseley; Merry Hill; Oxley (most); Park; Penn; St Peter's (most); Tettenhall Regis; Tettenhall Wightwick; and a small part of Bushbury North ward.

The seat comprises the whole of the current Wolverhampton South West constituency, with the addition of the Blakenhall ward from Wolverhampton South East and the Oxley ward from Wolverhampton North East (as they existed in 2020).

== History ==
The constituency was created by the Redistribution of Seats Act 1885 for the 1885 general election, when the former two-seat Wolverhampton constituency was divided into three single-member constituencies.

It was abolished for the 1950 general election, when it was largely replaced by the new Wolverhampton South West constituency.

== Members of Parliament ==
=== MPs 1885–1950 ===
Election	Member	Party
1885	Alfred Hickman	Conservative
1886	Sir William Chichele Plowden	Liberal
1892	Sir Alfred Hickman	Conservative
1906	Thomas Frederick Richards	Labour
1910	Sir Alfred Bird	Conservative
1922 by-election	Sir Robert Bird, Bt.	Conservative
1929	William Brown ^{1}	Labour
1929	William Brown ^{1}	Independent Labour
1931	Sir Robert Bird, Bt.	Conservative
1945	Billy Hughes	Labour
1950	constituency abolished: see Wolverhampton South West	

^{1} Brown was elected in 1929, as a Labour Party candidate, but later sat as an "Independent Labour" MP. He sought re-election in 1931 and 1935 as an independent Labour candidate, opposed in 1935 by an official Labour Party candidate, but lost on both occasions

=== MPs 2024– ===
Election	Member	Party
2024	Warinder Juss	Labour

== Election results ==
=== Elections in the 1880s ===
General election 1885: Wolverhampton West
Party	Candidate	Votes	%	±%
Conservative	Alfred Hickman	3,722	51.0	
Liberal	William Chichele Plowden	3,569	49.0	
Majority		153	2.0	
Turnout		7,291	86.9	
Registered electors		8,391		
Conservative win (new seat)				

General election 1886: Wolverhampton West
Party	Candidate	Votes	%	±%
Liberal	William Chichele Plowden	3,706	50.8	+1.8
Conservative	Alfred Hickman	3,583	49.2	−1.8
Majority		123	1.6	N/A
Turnout		7,289	86.9	0.0
Registered electors		8,391		
Liberal gain from Conservative		Swing	+1.8	

=== Elections in the 1890s ===
General election 1892: Wolverhampton West
Party	Candidate	Votes	%	±%
Conservative	Alfred Hickman	4,772	56.6	+7.4
Liberal	William Chichele Plowden	3,656	43.4	−7.4
Majority		1,116	13.2	N/A
Turnout		8,428	89.4	+2.5
Registered electors		9,424		
Conservative gain from Liberal		Swing	+7.4	

General election 1895: Wolverhampton West
Party	Candidate	Votes	%	±%
Conservative	Alfred Hickman	4,770	54.7	−1.9
Liberal	George Rennie Thorne	3,947	45.3	+1.9
Majority		823	9.4	−3.8
Turnout		8,717	86.6	−2.8
Registered electors		10,070		
Conservative hold		Swing	−1.9	

=== Elections in the 1900s ===
General election 1900: Wolverhampton West
Party	Candidate	Votes	%	±%
Conservative	Alfred Hickman	Unopposed		
Conservative hold				

General election 1906: Wolverhampton West
Party	Candidate	Votes	%	±%
Labour Repr. Cmte.	Thomas Frederick Richards	5,756	50.8	New
Conservative	Alfred Hickman	5,585	49.2	N/A
Majority		171	1.6	N/A
Turnout		11,341	89.3	N/A
Registered electors		12,707		
Labour Repr. Cmte. gain from Conservative		Swing	N/A	

=== Elections in the 1910s ===
General election January 1910: Wolverhampton West
Party	Candidate	Votes	%	±%
Conservative	Alfred Bird	6,382	52.4	+3.2
Labour	Thomas Frederick Richards	5,790	47.6	−3.2
Majority		592	4.8	N/A
Turnout		12,172	92.4	+3.1
Registered electors		13,170		
Conservative gain from Labour		Swing	+3.2	

General election December 1910: Wolverhampton West
Party	Candidate	Votes	%	±%
Conservative	Alfred Bird	5,925	51.3	−1.1
Liberal	P. Lewis	5,631	48.7	+1.1
Majority		294	2.6	−2.2
Turnout		11,556	87.7	−4.7
Registered electors		13,170		
Conservative hold		Swing	−1.1	

General election 1918: Wolverhampton West
Party		Candidate	Votes	%	±%
C	Unionist	Alfred Bird	13,329	56.8	+5.5
	Labour	Alexander Walkden	10,158	43.2	N/A
Majority			3,171	13.6	+11.0
Turnout			23,487	63.3	−24.4
	Unionist hold		Swing		
C indicates candidate endorsed by the coalition government.

=== Elections in the 1920s ===
By-election, March 1922: Wolverhampton West
Party		Candidate	Votes	%	±%
C	Unionist	Robert Bird	16,790	54.9	−1.9
	Labour	Alexander Walkden	13,799	45.1	+1.9
Majority			2,991	9.8	−3.8
Turnout			30,589	80.0	+16.7
	Unionist hold		Swing	−1.9	
C indicates candidate endorsed by the coalition government.

General election, November 1922: Wolverhampton West
Party	Candidate	Votes	%	±%
Unionist	Robert Bird	17,738	53.9	−2.9
Labour	Alexander Walkden	15,190	46.1	+2.9
Majority		2,548	7.8	−5.8
Turnout		32,928	83.5	+17.2
Unionist hold		Swing	−1.0	

General election, 1923: Wolverhampton West
Party	Candidate	Votes	%	±%
Unionist	Robert Bird	15,990	50.4	−3.5
Labour	William Brown	15,749	49.6	+3.5
Majority		241	0.8	−7.0
Turnout		31,739	79.5	−4.0
Unionist hold		Swing	−3.5	

General election, 1924: Wolverhampton West
Party	Candidate	Votes	%	±%
Unionist	Robert Bird	17,886	51.2	+0.8
Labour	William Brown	17,046	48.8	−0.8
Majority		840	2.4	+1.6
Turnout		34,932	85.9	+6.4
Unionist hold		Swing	+0.8	

General election, 1929: Wolverhampton West
Party	Candidate	Votes	%	±%
Labour	William Brown	21,103	49.1	+0.3
Unionist	Robert Bird	17,237	40.2	−11.0
Liberal	George H Roberts	4,580	10.7	N/A
Majority		3,866	8.9	N/A
Turnout		42,920	84.1	−1.8
Labour gain from Unionist		Swing	+6.8	

=== Elections in the 1930s ===
General election, 1931: Wolverhampton West Electorate: 51,355
Party	Candidate	Votes	%	±%
Conservative	Robert Bird	26,181	60.5	+20.3
Independent Labour	William Brown	17,090	39.5	−9.6
Majority		9,091	21.0	N/A
Turnout		43,271	84.3	+0.2
Conservative gain from Labour		Swing	+15.0	

General election, 1935: Wolverhampton West Electorate 49,537
Party	Candidate	Votes	%	±%
Conservative	Robert Bird	19,697	54.9	−5.6
Independent Labour	William Brown	14,867	41.4	+0.9
Labour	R. Lee	1,325	3.7	N/A
Majority		4,830	13.5	−7.5
Turnout		35,889	72.4	−11.9
Conservative hold		Swing	+3.3	

=== Elections in the 1940s ===
General election, 1945: Wolverhampton West
Party	Candidate	Votes	%	±%
Labour	Billy Hughes	21,186	59.9	+56.2
Conservative	James Beattie	14,176	40.1	−14.8
Majority		7,010	19.8	N/A
Turnout		35,362	74.8	+2.4
Labour gain from Conservative		Swing	+7.4	

=== Elections in the 2020s ===
General election 2024: Wolverhampton West
Party	Candidate	Votes	%	±%
Labour	Warinder Juss	19,331	44.3	▼1.3
Conservative	Mike Newton	11,463	26.3	▼21.1
Reform	Donald Brookes	6,078	13.9	▲11.4
Green	Andrea Cantrill	2,550	5.8	▲5.6
Ind. Network	Celia Hibbert	1,395	3.2	new
Liberal Democrats	Phillip Howells	1,376	3.2	▼1.2
Independent	Zahid Shah	888	2.0	new
Workers Party	Vikas Choprar	576	1.3	new
Majority		7,868	18.0	
Turnout		43,657	56.1	
Labour gain from Conservative		Swing	▲9.9	

Previous results are notional.

== See also ==
- List of Members of Parliament for Wolverhampton
- List of parliamentary constituencies in Wolverhampton
