= Bird's Custard =

Brand of imitation custard powder

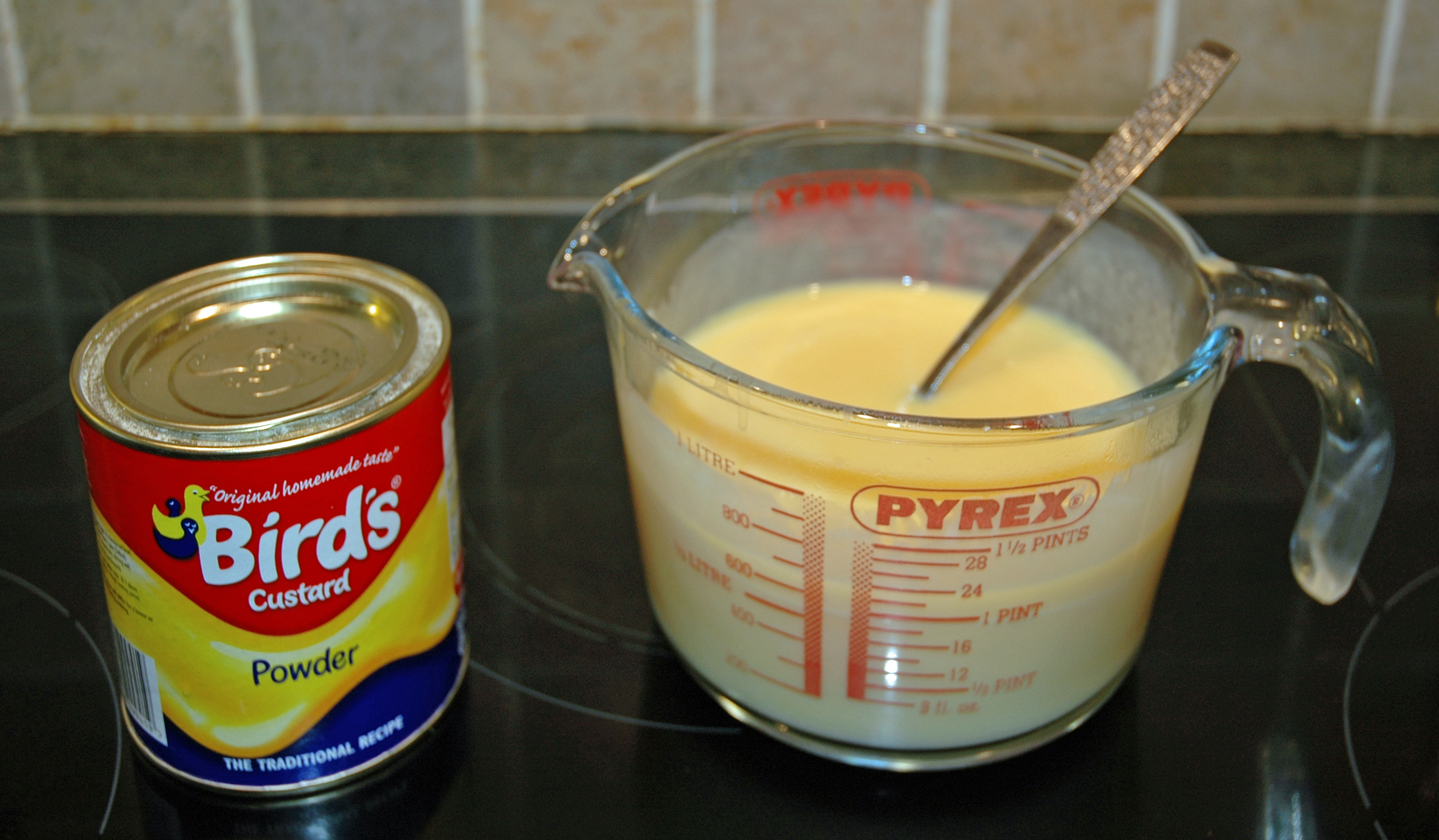
- A tin of Bird's Custard powder and prepared custard in a measuring jug
- Type: Custard
- Place of origin: United Kingdom
- Region or state: Birmingham
- Created by: Alfred Bird
- Main ingredients: Cornflour, salt, colouring, flavouring

Bird's Custard is the brand name for the original powdered, egg-free imitation custard powder, now owned by Premier Foods. Custard powder and instant custard powder are the generic product names for similar and competing products. The product is a powder, based on cornflour, which thickens to form a custard-like sauce when mixed with milk and heated.

== History ==
Bird's Custard was first formulated and cooked by Alfred Bird in 1837 at his chemist shop in Birmingham. He developed the recipe because his wife was allergic to eggs, the key ingredient used to thicken traditional custard. The Birds continued to serve egg-based custard to dinner guests, until one evening when the egg-free custard was served instead, either by accident or design. The dessert was so well received by the other diners that Alfred Bird put the recipe into wider production.

John Monkhouse (1862–1938) was a prosperous Methodist businessman who co-founded Monk and Glass, which made custard powder and jelly. Glass represented his business partner Frederick Thomas Glasscock. Monk and Glass custard was made in Clerkenwell and sold in the home market, and exported to the Empire and to America. Glasscock retired when the business was acquired by its rival Bird's Custard in the early 20th century.

== Usage ==
"Instant" versions (containing powdered milk and sugar and requiring only hot water) and ready-made custard in tins, plastic pots and cartons are also in production.

== Alfred Bird and Sons Ltd. ==
After he discovered his custard was popular, Bird formed Alfred Bird and Sons Ltd. in Birmingham. By 1843, the company was also making the newly invented baking powder and, by 1844, was promoting custard powder nationally. By 1895, the company was producing blancmange powder, jelly powder and egg substitute. In World War I, Bird's Custard was supplied to the British armed forces.

The company was one of the early users of promotional items and colourful advertising campaigns. The 'three bird' logo was introduced in 1929.

World War II saw rationing and serious production limits. Shortly after the war, Bird's was purchased by the General Foods Corporation, which was itself taken over by Philip Morris in the 1980s and merged into Kraft Foods. The Bird's Custard product remains as a brand. In late 2004, Kraft sold Bird's Custard and some other Kraft brands to Premier Foods, the owners as of 2026. However, they retained Bird’s custard in North America, and after the 2012 split of Kraft and 2015 Merger with Heinz, Bird’s custard in North America is currently owned by Kraft Heinz

In 1958, the company acquired Monk and Glass, a rival custard powder manufacturer based in London.

The original custard factory has long ceased to exist, but the larger factory Bird's opened in Gibb Street remains (production was relocated to Banbury in 1964, along with the factory gates, featuring the company logo), and has been adapted as the Custard Factory arts centre.

In 1981 an explosion at the Bird's Custard factory in Oxfordshire injured nine people.

== Ingredients ==
Until 2009, many Bird's products, including the instant custard powder, contained partially hydrogenated vegetable oil, a product now banned in some countries due to health concerns relating to heart disease. Since then, all Bird's custards have moved to unhydrogenated vegetable oil.

== Physical properties ==
Cooked custard is a weak gel, viscous and thixotropic. A suspension of uncooked custard powder (starch) in water, with the proper proportions, has the opposite rheological property: it is negative thixotropic, or dilatant, which is to say that it becomes more viscous when under pressure. This suspension is sometimes termed oobleck and often used in science demonstrations of non-Newtonian fluids. The popular-science programme Brainiac: Science Abuse demonstrated dilatancy dramatically by filling a swimming pool with this mixture and having presenter Jon Tickle walk across it.

== See also ==
- Instant pudding
