= List of MPs for Wolverhampton =

The following list is of members of Parliament who have represented constituencies covering the modern-day city of Wolverhampton (in the West Midlands of England) in the Parliament of the United Kingdom since the Reform Act 1832.

== 1832–1885 ==
=== Wolverhampton ===
From 1832 until 1885, Wolverhampton was represented by a single constituency, but which returned two members of Parliament.

- William Wolryche-Whitmore (1832–1835).
- Richard Fryer (1832–1835).
- Sir Charles Pelham Villiers (1835–1885), a noted free trader and the longest ever serving member of Parliament.
- Thomas Thornely (1835–1859).
- Sir Richard Bethell (1859–1861), who served as Attorney General and later as Lord High Chancellor of Great Britain.
- Thomas Matthias Weguelin (1861–1880).
- Henry Fowler (1880–1885), the first Methodist in the Cabinet.

== 1885–1950 ==
In 1885, Wolverhampton was divided into three new constituencies: Wolverhampton East, Wolverhampton South and Wolverhampton West. In 1918, Wolverhampton South was renamed as Bilston.

=== Wolverhampton East ===
- Henry Hartley Fowler (1885–1908); see above.
- George Rennie Thorne (1908–1929).
- Sir Geoffrey Mander (1929–1945), of the Mander family who owned a paint factory in Wolverhampton and Wightwick Manor. Mander was a famous Liberal opponent of the appeasement of Hitler and a supporter of the League of Nations.
- John Baird (1945–1950), known as the first Trotskyist MP for his involvement with the Revolutionary Socialist League.

=== Wolverhampton South/Bilston ===
- Sir Charles Pelham Villiers (1885–1898); see above.
- John Lloyd Gibbons (1898–1900).
- Sir Henry Norman (1900–1910).
- T. E. Hickman (Wolverhampton South 1910–1918, Bilston 1918–1922).
- Charles Howard-Bury (1922–1924).
- John Baker (1924–1931).
- Geoffrey Peto (1931–1935).
- Ian Hannah (1935–1944).
- William Gibbons (1944–1945).
- Will Nally (1945–1950).

=== Wolverhampton West ===
- Sir Alfred Hickman (1885–1886 and 1892–1906), the founder of Tarmac.
- Sir William Chichele Plowden (1886–1892).
- Thomas Frederick Richards (1906–1910).
- Sir Alfred Bird (1910–1922), a member of the Bird's Custard family.
- Sir Robert Bird (1922–1929 and 1931–1945), son of Sir Alfred Bird.
- William Brown (1929–1931).
- Billy Hughes (1945–1950), later Principal of Ruskin College.

== 1950–present ==
In 1950, the East and West constituencies were replaced by new Wolverhampton North East and Wolverhampton South West constituencies. The Bilston constituency was retained until 1974, when it was replaced by the new Wolverhampton South East constituency.

=== Bilston/Wolverhampton South East ===
- Will Nally (1950–1955).
- Robert Edwards (1955–1987), leader of the ILP Contingent in the Spanish Civil War.
- Dennis Turner (1987–2005).
- Pat McFadden (2005–present), a former government special adviser.

=== Wolverhampton North East ===
- John Baird, Labour (1950–1964); see above.
- Renee Short, Labour (1964–1987).
- Maureen Hicks, Conservative(1987–1992).
- Ken Purchase, Labour (1992–2010).
- Emma Reynolds, Labour (2010–2019), former Shadow Communities and Local Government Secretary
- Jane Stevenson, Conservative (2019-2024)
- Sureena Brackenridge, Labour (incumbent)

=== Wolverhampton South West/Wolverhampton West ===
- Enoch Powell (1950–1974), a Conservative shadow cabinet member and maverick, who made the Rivers of Blood speech in 1968.
- Nick Budgen (1974–1997), a Conservative eurosceptic and one of the Maastricht rebels in the early 1990s.
- Jenny Jones (1997–2001), a so-called "Blair Babe".
- Rob Marris (2001–2010).
- Paul Uppal (2010–2015).
- Rob Marris (2015–2017).
- Eleanor Smith (2017–2019).
- Stuart Anderson (2019–2024).
- Warrinder Juss (incumbent)

== See also ==
- List of parliamentary constituencies in Wolverhampton
