= 1908 Wolverhampton East by-election =

UK parliamentary by-election

| ← 1906 | 5 May 1908 | Jan. 1910 → |

| Candidate | Thorne | Amery |
| Party | Liberal | Liberal Unionist |
| Popular vote | 4,514 | 4,506 |
| Percentage | 50.0% | 50.0% |
MP before election
Henry Fowler
Liberal
Subsequent MP
George Rennie Thorne
Liberal

The 1908 Wolverhampton East by-election was held on 5 May 1908. The by-election was held due to the elevation to the peerage of the incumbent Liberal MP, Henry Fowler, who became Viscount Wolverhampton. It was won by the Liberal candidate George Rennie Thorne.

== Background ==
Thorne, who had stood unsuccessfully for election twice in the South and West divisions of Wolverhampton, seemed in nearly every way the stereotypical Liberal of his day; a pronounced nonconformist, a Baptist, in a constituency where there were many nonconformist voters. In his election meetings and literature he declared himself a supporter of free trade, the proposed Bill on Old Age Pensions, restricting to eight the hours that miners could be made to work daily, women’s suffrage, Irish Home Rule and any necessary reform of the House of Lords. He was also strongly in favour of temperance and a supporter of the disestablishment of the Church of England. Fowler had been unopposed in two of the previous four elections, and had won the last, in 1906, with more than two thirds of the votes cast, a majority of 2,865.

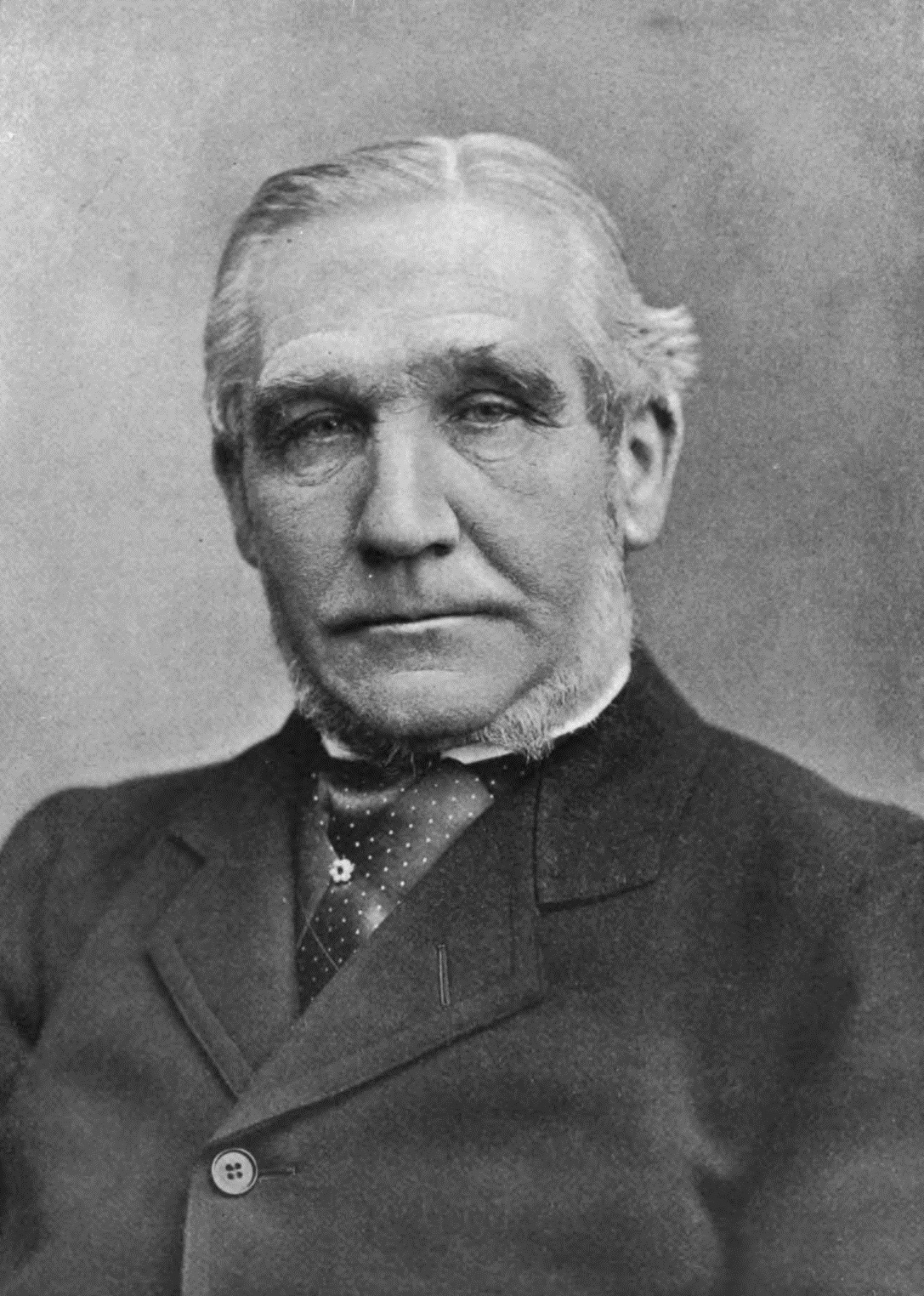
Fowler

General election 1906: Wolverhampton East
| Party | Candidate | Votes | % | ±% |
|---|---|---|---|---|
| Liberal | Henry Fowler | 5,610 | 67.1 | N/A |
| Liberal Unionist | Leo Amery | 2,745 | 32.9 | New |
| Majority | | 2,865 | 34.2 | N/A |
| Turnout | | 8,355 | 85.6 | N/A |
| Liberal hold | | Swing | N/A | |

== Result ==
Thorne won the by-election by a majority of just eight votes from the Unionist candidate Leo Amery, who had lost to Fowler in 1906.

Thorne

Wolverhampton East by-election, 1908
| Party | Candidate | Votes | % | ±% |
|---|---|---|---|---|
| Liberal | George Rennie Thorne | 4,514 | 50.0 | −17.1 |
| Liberal Unionist | Leo Amery | 4,506 | 50.0 | +17.1 |
| Majority | | 8 | 0.0 | −34.2 |
| Turnout | | 9,020 | 89.7 | +4.1 |
| Liberal hold | | Swing | -17.1 | |

One of reasons it was such a narrow margin was the policy of the Suffragists at this time to oppose the candidates of the Liberal government because they would not bring in a Bill to provide votes for women. This was despite the individual views of the candidates, many of whom, like Thorne, were pro-women’s suffrage. A Mrs Lois Dawson, who had incorrectly been placed on the electoral register as Louis Dawson, was allowed to vote by a surprised polling station presiding officer, as she was clearly on the electoral roll. Her vote was allowed to stand, although had there been a court scrutiny of the election result it would almost certainly have been rejected.

== Aftermath ==
General election January 1910: Wolverhampton East
| Party | Candidate | Votes | % | ±% |
|---|---|---|---|---|
| Liberal | George Rennie Thorne | 5,276 | 54.2 | +4.2 |
| Liberal Unionist | Leo Amery | 4,462 | 45.8 | −4.2 |
| Majority | | 814 | 8.4 | +8.4 |
| Turnout | | 9,738 | 95.1 | +5.4 |
| Registered electors | | 10,238 | | |
| Liberal hold | | Swing | +4.2 | |
