= Henry Fowler, 2nd Viscount Wolverhampton =

British peer

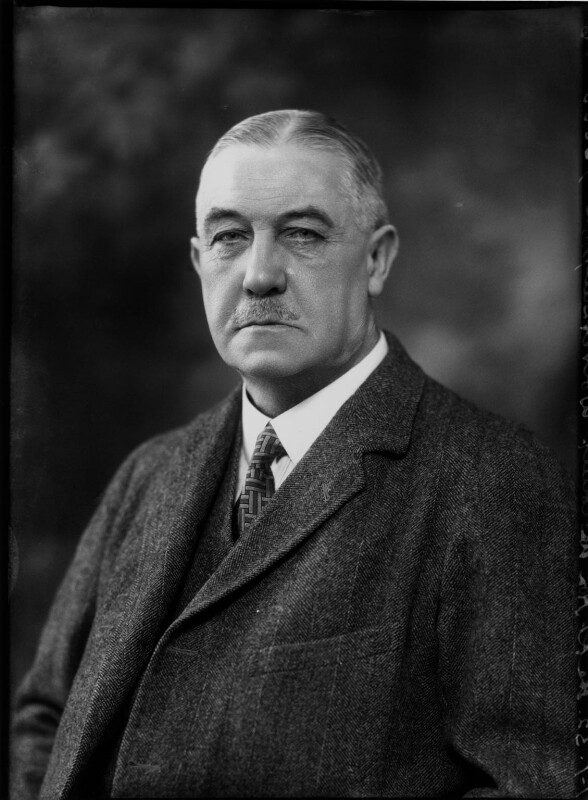
Fowler in 1932

Henry Ernest Fowler, 2nd Viscount Wolverhampton (4 April 1870 – 9 March 1943) was a British peer and composer.

Fowler was born at Tettenhall, Wolverhampton, into a Wesleyan Methodist family, the only son and heir of solicitor and politician Henry Hartley Fowler, 1st Viscount Wolverhampton and Ellen Thorneycroft CI, daughter of George Benjamin Thorneycroft. His sisters were the writers Ellen Thorneycroft Fowler and Edith Henrietta Fowler. He was educated at Charterhouse and Christ Church, Oxford.

On 8 June 1910, Fowler married Hon. Evelyn Henrietta Wrottesley (1866–1947), daughter of Arthur Wrottesley, 3rd Baron Wrottesley. They had no children.

In 1908, his father was created Viscount Wolverhampton, the first Methodist raised to the peerage. Henry Ernest succeeded to the title on the death of his father on 25 February 1911. The title became extinct on his death in 1943 at Carswood House, Overstrand, Norfolk.

== Arms ==
Coat of arms of Henry Fowler, 2nd Viscount Wolverhampton
| Crest Upon a rock a stork Argent holding in the beak a cross-moline Sable. Escutcheon Per pale Gules and Sable on a chevron between in chief two lions passant and in base a portcullis all Argent a rose of the first barbed and seeded Proper. Supporters Dexter a wolf Or charged on the shoulder with an escutcheon Gules thereon two keys in saltire wards upwards Argent sinister a Royal tiger Or striped Sable charged on the shoulder with an escutcheon Azure thereon an estoile Argent. Motto In Te Domine Speravi ("In thee, O Lord, have I put my trust") |

Peerage of the United Kingdom
| Preceded by Henry Hartley Fowler | Viscount Wolverhampton; 1911–1943 | Extinct |
