= Edith Henrietta Fowler =

British writer

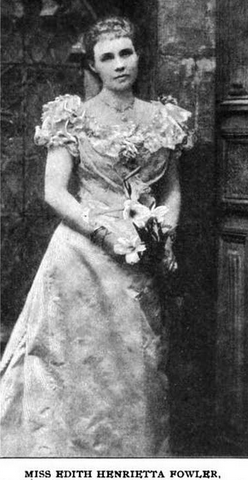
- Born: 16 February 1865; Wolverhampton
- Died: November 1944 (aged 79); Overstrand, Norfolk
- Occupation: Writer
- Parent: Henry Fowler, 1st Viscount Wolverhampton
- Relatives: Ellen Thorneycroft Fowler (sister); Henry Fowler, 2nd Viscount Wolverhampton (brother); George Benjamin Thorneycroft (grandfather)

Edith Henrietta Fowler (16 February 1865 – 18 November 1944) was a British writer.

== Early life ==
Edith Henrietta Fowler was born in 1865, the daughter of Henry Fowler, 1st Viscount Wolverhampton and Ellen Thorneycroft. Her sister was Ellen Thorneycroft Fowler, also a writer; her brother was Henry Fowler, 2nd Viscount Wolverhampton. Her maternal grandfather was George Benjamin Thorneycroft, first Mayor of Wolverhampton.

== Career ==
Fiction by Fowler included The Young Pretenders (1895, illustrated by Philip Burne-Jones) and The Professor’s Children (1897), both novels for young readers, A Corner of the West (1899), The World and Winstow (1901), For Richer, For Poorer (1905), Patricia (1915), and Christabel (1921). She also wrote a biography of her father, published in 1912.

The Young Pretenders, with its heroine Babs, was regarded in a review by the English novelist and editor James Payn in The Illustrated London News as "one of the best narratives of child-life I have read for years".

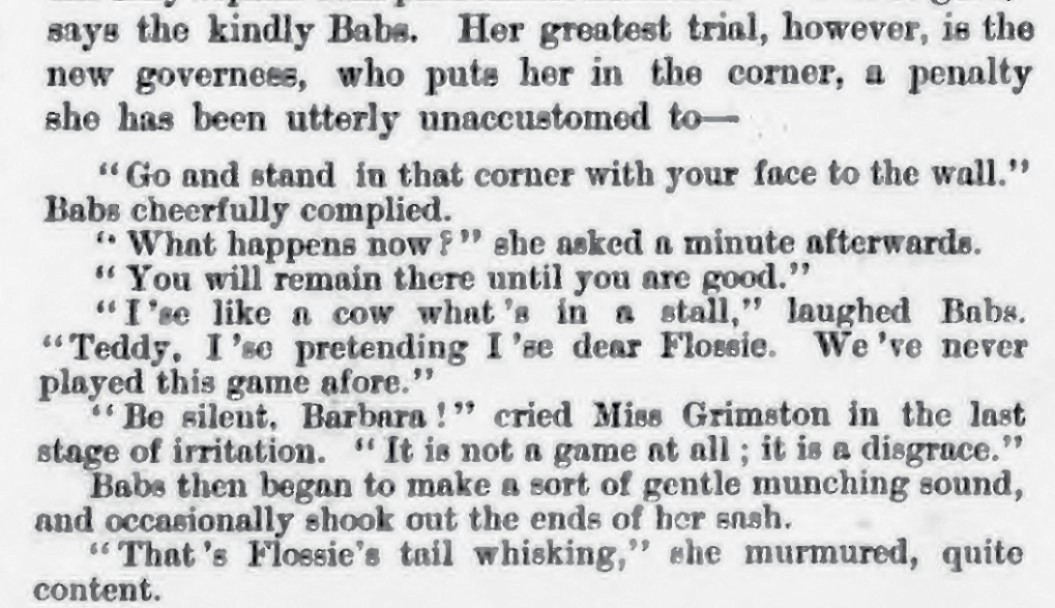
The Young Pretenders, a quote published as part of an ILN review

== Personal life ==
Fowler married the Reverend Robert Hamilton in 1903; they had two sons, the younger born when she was 43 years old. She died in 1944, aged 79 years, at Overstrand in Norfolk. Her book 1895 The Young Pretenders was reissued in 2007 by Persephone Books.
