= Richard Fryer =

Richard Fryer may refer to:

- Richard Fryer (politician)
- Richard Fryer (cinematographer)
