= Wolverhampton East =

Wolverhampton East may refer to:

- the eastern area of the city of Wolverhampton in the West Midlands of England
- Wolverhampton East (UK Parliament constituency) (1885–1950)
