= Wolverhampton South =

Wolverhampton South may refer to:

- the southern area of the city of Wolverhampton in the West Midlands of England
- Wolverhampton South (UK Parliament constituency) (1885–1918)
