= Bilston (constituency) =

Parliamentary constituency in the United Kingdom, 1918–1974

- Former borough constituency for the House of Commons

1950–February 1974
- Seats: one
- Created from: Wolverhampton Bilston
- Replaced by: Wolverhampton South East

Wolverhampton Bilston
- Former borough constituency for the House of Commons

1918–1950
- Seats: one
- Created from: Wolverhampton South
- Replaced by: Bilston

Bilston was a parliamentary constituency centred on the town of Bilston in what is now the southeast of the city of Wolverhampton in the West Midlands. It returned one Member of Parliament (MP) to the House of Commons of the Parliament of the United Kingdom.

As well as the town of Bilston, which had been heavily industrialised town since the 19th century, it also incorporated the nearby communities of Sedgley and Coseley, both of which were still predominantly rural villages when the parliamentary seat was created in 1918, but by the time the constituency changed from Wolverhampton Bilston to Bilston 32 years later they were rapidly expanding into towns, and had expanded further still when the constituency was finally abolished in 1974.

== History ==
The area was created, as a Staffordshire borough constituency, for the 1918 general election. It was named as a division of Wolverhampton. From the 1950 general election the Wolverhampton prefix was dropped from the official constituency name. The seat was abolished for the February 1974 general election, when it was largely replaced by the new Wolverhampton South East constituency.

== Boundaries ==
1918–1950: The constituency consisted of the then Urban Districts of Bilston, Coseley and Sedgley.

1950–1974: By 1950 Bilston was a Municipal Borough. Coseley and Sedgley were still Urban Districts in the constituency. In 1966 most of Sedgley was incorporated into an expanded borough of Dudley, which also took in the south of Coseley, while the remainder of Sedgley was transferred to Wolverhampton and Seisdon and sections of Coseley were transferred to Wolverhampton and West Bromwich.

== Members of Parliament ==
Year	Member	Party
1918	T. E. Hickman	Conservative
1922	Charles Howard-Bury	Conservative
1924	John Baker	Labour
1931	Geoffrey Peto	Conservative
1935	Ian Hannah	Conservative
1944 by-election	William Gibbons	Conservative
1945	Will Nally	Labour
1955	Bob Edwards	Labour Co-op
Feb 1974	constituency abolished: see Wolverhampton South East	

== Election results ==
=== Elections in the 1910s ===
General election 1918: Wolverhampton Bilston
Party		Candidate	Votes	%
C	Unionist	T. E. Hickman	10,343	60.5
	Labour	John William Kynaston	6,744	39.5
Majority			3,599	21.0
Turnout			17,087	59.9
Registered electors				
	Unionist win (new seat)			
C indicates candidate endorsed by the coalition government.

=== Elections in the 1920s ===
General election 1922: Wolverhampton Bilston
Party	Candidate	Votes	%	±%
Unionist	Charles Howard-Bury	12,297	54.2	–6.3
Labour	John Baker	10,392	45.8	+6.3
Majority		1,905	8.4	–12.6
Turnout		22,689	73.8	+13.9
Registered electors				
Unionist hold		Swing	–6.3	

General election 1923: Wolverhampton Bilston
Party	Candidate	Votes	%	±%
Unionist	Charles Howard-Bury	10,186	41.6	–12.6
Labour	John Baker	9,085	37.1	–8.7
Liberal	John Prentice	5,205	21.3	New
Majority		1,101	4.5	–3.9
Turnout		24,476	74.9	+1.1
Registered electors				
Unionist hold		Swing	–1.9	

General election 1924: Wolverhampton Bilston
Party	Candidate	Votes	%	±%
Labour	John Baker	14,583	53.2	+16.1
Unionist	Charles Howard-Bury	12,840	46.8	–5.2
Majority		1,743	6.4	N/A
Turnout		27,423	82.0	+7.1
Registered electors				
Labour gain from Unionist		Swing	+5.5	

General election 1929: Wolverhampton Bilston
Party	Candidate	Votes	%	±%
Labour	John Baker	18,679	50.7	–2.5
Unionist	S.J. Thompson	13,635	37.1	–9.7
Liberal	Gilbert Salter	4,475	12.2	New
Majority		5,044	13.6	+7.2
Turnout		36,789	85.4	+3.4
Registered electors				
Labour hold		Swing	+3.6	

=== Elections in the 1930s ===
General election 1931: Wolverhampton Bilston
Party	Candidate	Votes	%	±%
Conservative	Geoffrey Peto	20,620	55.04	
Labour	John Baker	16,847	44.96	
Majority		3,773	10.08	N/A
Turnout		37,467	81.37	
Registered electors				
Conservative gain from Labour		Swing		

General election 1935: Wolverhampton Bilston
Party	Candidate	Votes	%	±%
Conservative	Ian Hannah	18,689	51.2	–3.8
Labour	David Mort	17,820	48.8	+3.8
Majority		869	2.4	–7.7
Turnout		36,509	70.9	–1.5
Registered electors				
Conservative hold		Swing		

=== Elections in the 1940s ===
1944 Bilston by-election
Party	Candidate	Votes	%	±%
Conservative	William Gibbons	9,693	50.63	
Ind. Labour Party	A. Eaton	9,344	49.08	New
Majority		349	1.55	
Turnout		19,037		
Registered electors				
Conservative hold		Swing		

General election 1945: Wolverhampton Bilston
Party	Candidate	Votes	%	±%
Labour Co-op	Will Nally	31,493	66.96	
Conservative	William Gibbons	14,691	31.24	
Ind. Labour Party	A. Eaton	849	1.81	N/A
Majority		16,802	35.72	N/A
Turnout		47,033	73.08	
Registered electors				
Labour Co-op gain from Conservative		Swing		

=== Elections in the 1950s ===
General election 1950: Bilston
Party	Candidate	Votes	%	±%
Labour Co-op	Will Nally	29,919	62.62	
Conservative	J Godrich	17,858	37.38	
Majority		12,061	25.24	
Turnout		47,777	83.50	
Registered electors				
Labour Co-op hold		Swing		

General election 1951: Bilston
Party	Candidate	Votes	%	±%
Labour Co-op	Will Nally	31,381	61.86	
National Liberal	Charles Gordon-Spencer	19,352	38.14	
Majority		12,029	23.72	
Turnout		50,733	82.76	
Registered electors				
Labour Co-op hold		Swing		

General election 1955: Bilston
Party	Candidate	Votes	%	±%
Labour Co-op	Bob Edwards	26,490	57.62	
Conservative	E Anne Marsh	19,482	42.38	
Majority		7,008	15.24	
Turnout		45,972	74.36	
Registered electors				
Labour Co-op hold		Swing		

General election 1959: Bilston
Party	Candidate	Votes	%	±%
Labour Co-op	Bob Edwards	27,068	53.50	
Conservative	F John Oxford	23,523	46.50	
Majority		3,545	7.00	
Turnout		50,591	76.81	
Registered electors				
Labour Co-op hold		Swing		

=== Elections in the 1960s ===
General election 1964: Bilston
Party	Candidate	Votes	%	±%
Labour Co-op	Bob Edwards	27,986	53.13	
Conservative	F John Oxford	24,686	46.87	
Majority		3,300	6.26	
Turnout		52,672	74.18	
Registered electors				
Labour Co-op hold		Swing		

General election 1966: Bilston
Party	Candidate	Votes	%	±%
Labour Co-op	Bob Edwards	29,794	56.93	
Conservative	F John Oxford	22,541	43.07	
Majority		7,253	13.86	
Turnout		52,335	73.21	
Registered electors				
Labour Co-op hold		Swing		

=== Elections in the 1970s ===
General election 1970: Bilston
Party	Candidate	Votes	%	±%
Labour Co-op	Bob Edwards	27,240	50.9	–6.0
Conservative	Charles Irving	26,240	49.1	+6.0
Majority		1,000	1.8	–12.1
Turnout		53,480	69.4	–3.7
Registered electors				
Labour Co-op hold		Swing		

== See also ==
- List of Members of Parliament for Wolverhampton
- List of parliamentary constituencies in Wolverhampton
