= Charles Pelham Villiers =

British lawyer and politician (1802–1898)

The Right Honourable Charles Pelham Villiers
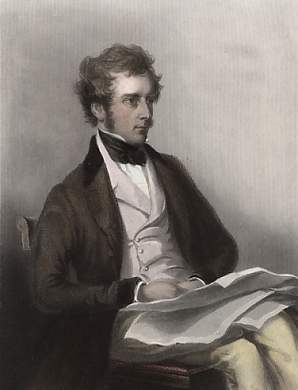
- Engraving by John Cochran after a portrait by C. A. Du Val.

President of the Poor Law Board
- In office 9 July 1859 – 26 June 1866
- Monarch: Victoria
- Prime Minister: The Viscount Palmerston; The Earl Russell
- Preceded by: Thomas Milner Gibson
- Succeeded by: Gathorne Hardy

Member of Parliament for Wolverhampton South Wolverhampton (1835–1885)
- In office 6 January 1835 – 16 January 1898
- Monarchs: William IV; Victoria
- Preceded by: William Wolryche-Whitmore
- Succeeded by: John Lloyd Gibbons

Personal details
- Born: 3 January 1802
- Died: 16 January 1898 (aged 96)
- Party: Liberal; Liberal Unionist
- Parents: George Villiers; Theresa Parker
- Education: St John's College, Cambridge

Charles Pelham Villiers (3 January 1802 – 16 January 1898) was a British lawyer and politician from the aristocratic Villiers family. He sat in the House of Commons for 63 years, from 1835 to 1898, making him the longest-serving Member of Parliament (MP). He also holds the distinction of the oldest candidate to win a parliamentary seat, at 93. He was a radical and reformer who often collaborated with John Bright and had a noteworthy effect in the leadership of the Anti-Corn Law League, until the repeal of the Corn Laws in 1846. Lord Palmerston appointed him to the cabinet as president of the Poor-Law Board in 1859. His Public Works (Manufacturing Districts) Act 1863 (26 & 27 Vict. c. 70) opened job-creating schemes in public health projects. He progressed numerous other reforms, most notably the Metropolitan Poor Act 1867 (30 & 31 Vict. c. 6). Florence Nightingale helped him formulate the reform, in particular, ensure professionalisation of nursing as part of the poor law regime, the workhouses of which erected public infirmaries under an Act of the same year. His political importance was overshadowed by his brother, the Earl of Clarendon, and undercut by the hostility of Gladstone.

== Background and education ==
Villiers was the son of the Hon. George Villiers and the Hon. Theresa, daughter of John Parker, 1st Baron Boringdon. He was the grandson of Thomas Villiers, 1st Earl of Clarendon, and brother of George Villiers, 4th Earl of Clarendon. He was educated at East India Company College and St John's College, Cambridge, becoming a barrister at Lincoln's Inn in 1827. He was raised to the rank of an Earl's son in 1839 and thus entitled to be styled the Honourable Charles Pelham Villiers.

== Political career ==
Villiers held Benthamite political views and enjoyed a long career in public service and Parliament. In 1832, he was a Poor Law Commissioner, and from 1833 to 1852 was an examiner of witnesses in the Court of Chancery.

Villiers was elected as a Liberal Member of Parliament for Wolverhampton in 1835. In each year from 1837 to 1845, he launched parliamentary debates in attempts to repeal the Corn Laws. In 1838, he spoke to over 5,000 "working-class men" in Manchester and told them that the presence of so large an audience gave him the proof that "the working class man was with him". Villiers was unsuccessful in his attempts, but in 1840 sat on the Committee on Import Duties that provided much of the evidence that pressured Robert Peel into his sliding scale concession in 1842. The bluebook produced by the Committee on Import Duties was published in pamphlet form and distributed across the country by the Anti-Corn Law League, it was reprinted in America and quoted by all leading newspapers of the day, the Spectator published it in abridged form. In February 1842, Villiers was called by Monckton Milnes MP, the "solitary Robinson Crusoe standing on the barren rock of Corn Law repeal". In 1842, the majority in favour of retaining the Corn Laws had been 303, at the vote on Villiers motion in June 1845 it was down to 132. After the repeal in 1846, the press said of Villiers that he was "the most persevering and undaunted supporter of those principles within the house". David Ricardo, Chairman of the Free Traders in London, wished to raise money to give to Villiers in recognition of his work, but Villiers declined.

Villiers was a corresponding member of the British and Foreign Anti-Slavery Society, and he attended the World Anti-Slavery Convention in London in 1840.

In 1847, Villiers was returned for Lancashire South but elected to sit for his former constituency; his election in Lancashire South was unsolicited but an honour conferred by the people there to express their gratitude for his good work with the repeal of the Corn Laws. Villiers was sworn of the Privy Council in 1853 and served under Lord Aberdeen and Lord Palmerston as Judge Advocate General from 1852 to 1858. In 1853 the Times observed that "it was Mr. Charles Villiers who practically originated the Free Trade movement". He served under Palmerston and Lord Russell as President of the Poor Law Board (with a seat in the cabinet) from 1859 to 1866. In 1876, he wrote to the Manchester-based Women's Suffrage Journal in which he stated, in the words of the Journal, that "he had voted for the measure [suffrage] on more than one occasion, and should do so again. As far as he was acquainted with the objections usually alleged, he was bound to say they only appear to be those which have always been offered whenever any fresh extension of liberty to the subject has been proposed, and which he had himself heard urged against personal freedom in the colonies, religious liberty in this country, the enfranchisement of the working classes, and against the abolition of every monopoly, political and commercial, wherever it has been assailed".

Villiers was offered a peerage in June 1885, but declined. His Wolverhampton constituency was divided under the Redistribution of Seats Act 1885 and he was then elected for Wolverhampton South, switching to the Liberal Unionist party in 1886. He was the Father of the House of Commons from 1890 until his death in 1898. However, the last time he attended Parliament was in 1895. During his time in Parliament he worked towards free trade and opposed the Corn Laws and home rule for Ireland. He is noted as being the voice in parliament of the free trade movement before the election of Richard Cobden and John Bright.

== Personal life ==
Villiers died unmarried in January 1898, aged 96. He is buried at Kensal Green Cemetery. A statue of him stands in West Park in Wolverhampton.

Parliament of the United Kingdom
Preceded by William Wolryche-Whitmore; Richard Fryer	Member of Parliament for Wolverhampton; 1835–1885; With: Thomas Thornely, 1835–1859; Sir Richard Bethell, 1859–1861; Thomas Matthias Weguelin, 1861–1880; Henry Fowler, 1880–1885	Constituency divided see: Wolverhampton East; Wolverhampton South; Wolverhampton West
New constituency before: Wolverhampton	Member of Parliament for Wolverhampton South; 1885–1898	Succeeded by John Lloyd Gibbons
Preceded by Christopher Talbot	Father of the House; 1890–1898	Succeeded by Sir John Mowbray, Bt
Preceded by James Patrick Mahon	Oldest Member of Parliament; 1885–1887	Succeeded by James Patrick Mahon
Preceded by James Patrick Mahon	Oldest Member of Parliament; 1891–1898	Succeeded by Sir John Mowbray, Bt
Political offices
Preceded by George Bankes	Judge Advocate General; 1852–1858	Succeeded by John Mowbray
Preceded by Thomas Milner Gibson	President of the Poor Law Board; 1859–1866	Succeeded by Gathorne Hardy
