= Wolverhampton (constituency) =

Parliamentary constituency in the United Kingdom, 1832–1885

- Former borough constituency for the House of Commons

1832–1885
- Seats: Two
- Created from: Staffordshire
- Replaced by: Wolverhampton East, Wolverhampton South and Wolverhampton West

Wolverhampton was a parliamentary constituency centred on the town of Wolverhampton in Staffordshire. It elected two Members of Parliament to the House of Commons of the Parliament of the United Kingdom.

== History ==
The constituency was created under the Reform Act 1832, and first used at the 1832 general election. It was abolished by the Redistribution of Seats Act 1885, when it was replaced for the 1885 general election by three new single-member constituencies: Wolverhampton East, Wolverhampton South and Wolverhampton West.

== Members of Parliament ==
Election	1st Member	1st Party	2nd Member	2nd Party
1832	William Wolryche-Whitmore	Whig	Richard Fryer	Whig
1835	Charles Pelham Villiers	Radical	Thomas Thornely	Radical
1859	Charles Pelham Villiers	Liberal	Sir Richard Bethell	Liberal
1861 by-election	Charles Pelham Villiers	Liberal	Thomas Matthias Weguelin	Liberal
1880	Charles Pelham Villiers	Liberal	Henry Fowler	Liberal
1885	constituency divided: see Wolverhampton East, Wolverhampton South and Wolverhampton West.			

== Election results ==
=== Elections in the 1830s ===
General election 1832: Wolverhampton
Party	Candidate	Votes	%
Whig	William Wolryche-Whitmore	850	32.3
Whig	Richard Fryer	810	30.8
Tory	Francis Holyoake	615	23.4
Radical	John Nicholson	358	13.6
Majority		195	7.4
Turnout		1,463	86.1
Registered electors		1,700	
Whig win (new seat)			
Whig win (new seat)			

General election 1835: Wolverhampton
Party	Candidate	Votes	%	±%
Radical	Charles Pelham Villiers	776	30.0	N/A
Radical	Thomas Thornely	776	30.0	N/A
Conservative	Dudley Fereday	658	25.5	+2.1
Radical	John Nicholson	374	14.5	+0.9
Majority		118	4.5	N/A
Turnout		1,498	81.5	−4.6
Registered electors		1,839		
Radical gain from Whig		Swing		
Radical gain from Whig		Swing		

General election 1837: Wolverhampton
Party	Candidate	Votes	%	±%
Radical	Charles Pelham Villiers	1,068	32.1	+2.1
Radical	Thomas Thornely	1,024	30.8	+0.8
Conservative	Ryder Burton	623	18.7	+6.0
Conservative	John Benbow	613	18.4	+5.7
Majority		401	12.1	+7.6
Turnout		1,675	77.2	−4.3
Registered electors		2,170		
Radical hold		Swing	−1.9	
Radical hold		Swing	−3.3	

=== Elections in the 1840s ===
General election 1841: Wolverhampton
Party	Candidate	Votes	%	±%
Radical	Charles Pelham Villiers	Unopposed		
Radical	Thomas Thornely	Unopposed		
Registered electors		2,571		
Radical hold				
Radical hold				

General election 1847: Wolverhampton
Party	Candidate	Votes	%	±%
Radical	Charles Pelham Villiers	Unopposed		
Radical	Thomas Thornely	Unopposed		
Registered electors		2,692		
Radical hold				
Radical hold				

=== Elections in the 1850s ===
General election 1852: Wolverhampton
Party	Candidate	Votes	%	±%
Radical	Charles Pelham Villiers	Unopposed		
Radical	Thomas Thornely	Unopposed		
Registered electors		3,587		
Radical hold				
Radical hold				

Villiers was appointed Judge-Advocate-General of the Armed Forces, requiring a by-election.

By-election, 4 January 1853: Wolverhampton
Party	Candidate	Votes	%	±%
Radical	Charles Pelham Villiers	Unopposed		
Radical hold				

General election 1857: Wolverhampton
Party	Candidate	Votes	%	±%
Radical	Charles Pelham Villiers	Unopposed		
Radical	Thomas Thornely	Unopposed		
Registered electors		3,611		
Radical hold				
Radical hold				

General election 1859: Wolverhampton
Party	Candidate	Votes	%	±%
Liberal	Charles Pelham Villiers	Unopposed		
Liberal	Richard Bethell	Unopposed		
Registered electors		3,821		
Liberal hold				
Liberal hold				

Bethell was appointed Attorney General for England and Wales, requiring a by-election.

By-election, 27 June 1859: Wolverhampton
Party	Candidate	Votes	%	±%
Liberal	Richard Bethell	Unopposed		
Liberal hold				

Villiers was appointed President of the Poor Law Board, requiring a by-election.

By-election, 9 July 1859: Wolverhampton
Party	Candidate	Votes	%	±%
Liberal	Charles Pelham Villiers	Unopposed		
Liberal hold				

=== Elections in the 1860s ===
Bethell resigned after being appointed Lord Chancellor, causing him to become Lord Westbury and a by-election to be called.

By-election, 3 July 1861: Wolverhampton
Party	Candidate	Votes	%	±%
Liberal	Thomas Matthias Weguelin	1,363	48.7	N/A
Liberal	Samuel Griffiths	772	27.6	N/A
Conservative	Alexander Staveley Hill	665	23.8	New
Majority		591	21.1	N/A
Turnout		2,800	68.1	N/A
Registered electors		4,110		
Liberal hold		Swing	N/A	

General election 1865: Wolverhampton
Party	Candidate	Votes	%	±%
Liberal	Charles Pelham Villiers	1,623	50.9	N/A
Liberal	Thomas Matthias Weguelin	1,519	47.6	N/A
Conservative	Thomas Thornycroft	47	1.5	N/A
Majority		1,472	46.1	N/A
Turnout		1,618 (est)	33.5 (est)	N/A
Registered electors		4,830		
Liberal hold		Swing	N/A	
Liberal hold		Swing	N/A	

General election 1868: Wolverhampton
Party	Candidate	Votes	%	±%
Liberal	Charles Pelham Villiers	Unopposed		
Liberal	Thomas Matthias Weguelin	Unopposed		
Registered electors		15,772		
Liberal hold				
Liberal hold				

=== Elections in the 1870s ===
General election 1874: Wolverhampton
Party	Candidate	Votes	%	±%
Liberal	Charles Pelham Villiers	10,358	43.1	N/A
Liberal	Thomas Matthias Weguelin	10,036	41.8	N/A
Conservative	Walter Williams	3,628	15.1	New
Majority		6,408	26.7	N/A
Turnout		13,825 (est)	59.4 (est)	N/A
Registered electors		23,257		
Liberal hold		Swing	N/A	
Liberal hold		Swing	N/A	

=== Elections in the 1880s ===
General election 1880: Wolverhampton
Party	Candidate	Votes	%	±%
Liberal	Charles Pelham Villiers	12,197	41.1	−2.0
Liberal	Henry Fowler	11,606	39.1	−2.7
Conservative	Alfred Hickman	5,874	19.8	+4.7
Majority		5,732	19.3	−7.4
Turnout		17,776 (est)	77.9 (est)	+18.5
Registered electors		22,821		
Liberal hold		Swing	−2.2	
Liberal hold		Swing	−2.5	

== See also ==
- List of Members of Parliament for Wolverhampton
- List of parliamentary constituencies in Wolverhampton
