= 1944 Bilston by-election =

UK parliamentary by-election

A by-election for the constituency of Bilston in the United Kingdom House of Commons was held on 20 September 1944, caused by the death of the incumbent Conservative MP Ian Hannah. The result was a hold for the Conservative Party, with their candidate William Ernest Gibbons, with a majority of just 349 votes over an Independent Labour Party candidate.

== Election history ==
General election 1935: Bilston
| Party | Candidate | Votes | % | ±% |
|---|---|---|---|---|
| Conservative | Ian Hannah | 18,689 | 51.2 | |
| Labour | David Mort | 17,820 | 48.8 | |
| Majority | | 869 | 2.4 | |
| Turnout | | 36,509 | 70.9 | |
| Conservative hold | | Swing | | |

== Result ==
Bilston by-election, 1944
| Party | Candidate | Votes | % | ±% |
|---|---|---|---|---|
| Conservative | William Ernest Gibbons | 9,693 | 50.9 | −0.3 |
| Ind. Labour Party | A. Eaton | 9,344 | 49.1 | New |
| Majority | | 349 | 1.8 | −0.6 |
| Turnout | | 19,037 | | |
| Conservative hold | | Swing | | |
