= Henry Fowler, 1st Viscount Wolverhampton =

British politician

The Right Honourable The Viscount Wolverhampton GCSI PC
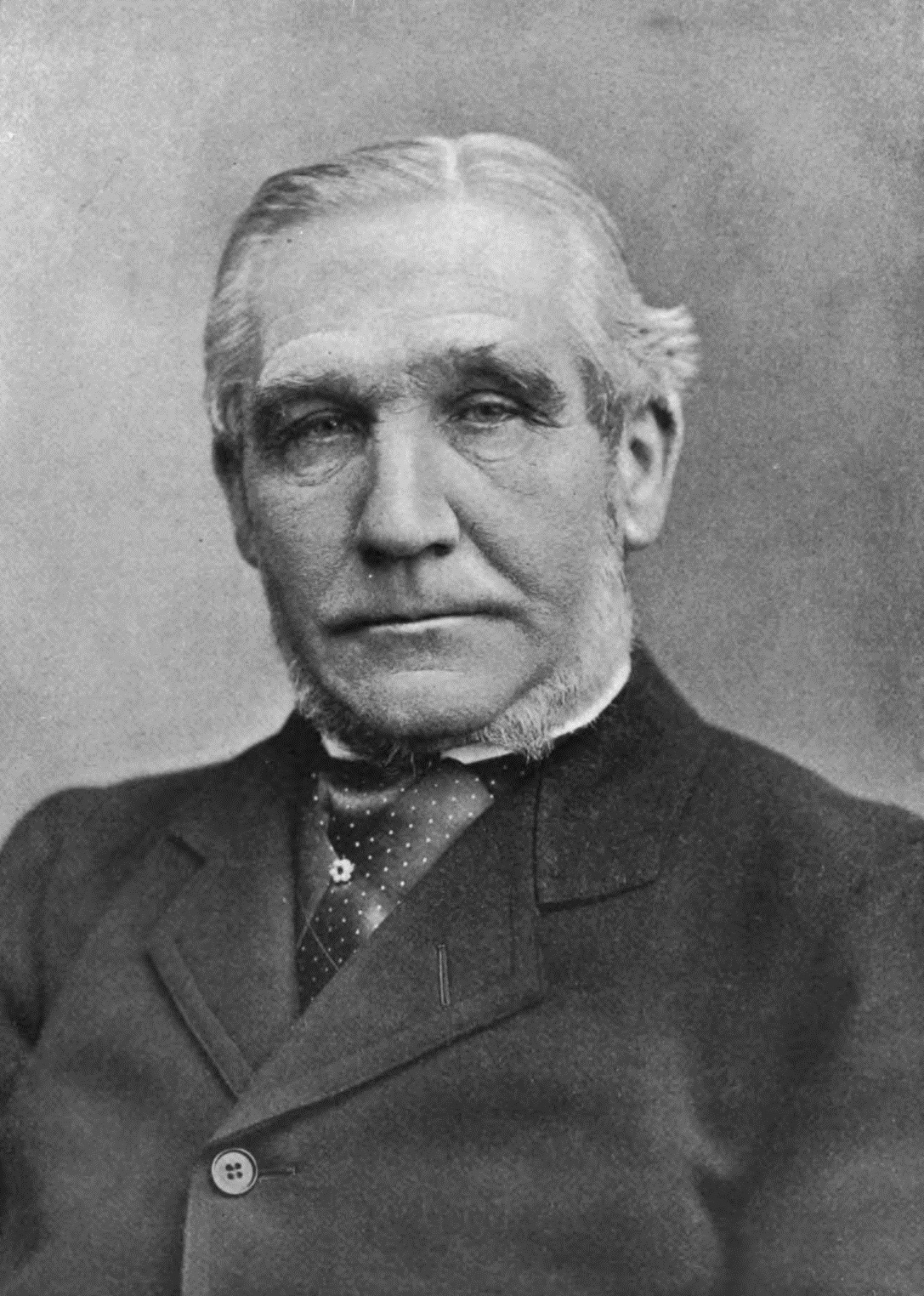

Secretary of State for India
- In office 10 March 1894 – 21 June 1895
- Monarch: Victoria
- Prime Minister: The Earl of Rosebery
- Preceded by: The Earl of Kimberley
- Succeeded by: Lord George Hamilton

Chancellor of the Duchy of Lancaster
- In office 10 December 1905 – 13 October 1908
- Monarch: Edward VII
- Prime Minister: Henry Campbell-Bannerman; H. H. Asquith
- Preceded by: Sir William Walrond, Bt
- Succeeded by: The Lord Fitzmaurice

Lord President of the Council
- In office 13 October 1908 – 16 June 1910
- Monarchs: Edward VII; George V
- Prime Minister: H. H. Asquith
- Preceded by: The Lord Tweedmouth
- Succeeded by: The Lord Beauchamp

Personal details
- Born: 16 May 1830 Sunderland, County Durham. England
- Died: 25 February 1911 (aged 80) Wolverhampton, Staffordshire, England
- Party: Liberal
- Spouse: Ellen Thorneycroft
- Children: Ellen, Edith, and Henry

Henry Hartley Fowler, 1st Viscount Wolverhampton, GCSI, PC (16 May 1830 – 25 February 1911) was a British solicitor and Liberal politician who sat in the House of Commons from 1880 until 1908 when he was raised to the peerage. A member of the Wesleyan Methodist Church, he was the first solicitor and the first Methodist to enter the Cabinet or to be raised to the peerage.

== Early life ==
Fowler was born in Sunderland, the son of Rev. Joseph Fowler (1791-1851) and his second wife Elizabeth Macneil nee Laing (stepdaughter of John Hartley 1775-1833). He was educated at Woodhouse Grove School, Apperley Bridge, Bradford (1840–42) and later at St. Saviour's Grammar School, Southwark.

He moved from London to Wolverhampton in 1855 having been admitted as a solicitor in 1852. He served as a local councillor and was Mayor of Wolverhampton in 1866. He was chairman of Wolverhampton School Board in 1870, and was a deputy lieutenant for Staffordshire and JP for Wolverhampton.

== Political career ==
At the 1880 general election Fowler was elected as a Liberal Member of Parliament (MP) for the borough of Wolverhampton, a seat he held until the borough was divided under the Redistribution of Seats Act 1885. He then was then returned at the 1885 general election as the MP for Wolverhampton East. In the 1895 Prime Minister's Resignation Honours he was appointed GCSI. He remained in Parliament until he was ennobled in 1908. He served under William Ewart Gladstone as Under-Secretary of State for the Home Department from 1884 to 1885, as Financial Secretary to the Treasury in 1886 and as President of the Local Government Board from 1892 to 1894 and under Lord Rosebery as Secretary of State for India from 1894 to 1895. In 1886, he was sworn of the Privy Council.

Fowler later held office under Sir Henry Campbell-Bannerman and H. H. Asquith as Chancellor of the Duchy of Lancaster between 1905 and 1908. The latter year he was raised to the peerage as Viscount Wolverhampton, of Wolverhampton in the County of Stafford, and served under Asquith as Lord President of the Council until 1910. He was widely thought of as a future Prime Minister of the United Kingdom, but his ill health prevented this.

In his approach to policymaking, according to Neil Smith, Fowler was supportive of reform legislation in the areas of pensions, education, and the Poor Law. An example of his support for progressive social reform can also be found in a 1908 address he made, in which Fowler proclaimed (as noted by one journal) that "Proposals must be made to ameliorate the condition of the workers-those prevented by age or infirmity or by bad trade from obtaining work". According to his private secretary, however, he did not have "the patience to suffer Radical and Labour members gladly."

He was an elected President of The Law Society 1901–02.

Lord Wolverhampton died on 25 February 1911, aged 80.

== Family ==
Fowler married Ellen Thorneycroft, daughter of ironmaster and first Mayor of Wolverhampton, George Benjamin Thorneycroft, in 1857. They had a son and two daughters.

Their son Henry succeeded to the viscountcy. Their daughters were the authors the Hon. Ellen Thorneycroft Fowler and the Hon. Edith Henrietta Fowler (who wrote a biography of her father).

Viscountess Wolverhampton's great nephew was Peter Thorneycroft.

== Arms ==
Coat of arms of Henry Fowler, 1st Viscount Wolverhampton
Crest Upon a rock a stork Argent holding in the beak a cross-moline Sable. Escutcheon Per pale Gules and Sable on a chevron between in chief two lions passant and in base a portcullis all Argent a rose of the first barbed and seeded Proper. Supporters Dexter a wolf Or charged on the shoulder with an escutcheon Gules thereon two keys in saltire wards upwards Argent sinister a Royal tiger Or striped Sable charged on the shoulder with an escutcheon Azure thereon an estoile Argent. Motto In Te Domine Speravi

Parliament of the United Kingdom
Preceded by Hon. Charles Pelham Villiers; Thomas Matthias Weguelin	Member of Parliament for Wolverhampton; 1880–1885; With: Hon. Charles Pelham Villiers	Constituency divided see Wolverhampton East; Wolverhampton South; Wolverhampton West
New constituency before: Wolverhampton	Member of Parliament for Wolverhampton East; 1885–1908	Succeeded by George Thorne
Political offices
Preceded by George Lees Underhill	Mayor of Wolverhampton; 1862–1863	Succeeded by John Hawksford
Preceded by John Tomlinson Hibbert	Under-Secretary of State for the Home Department; 1884–1885	Succeeded by Charles Stuart-Wortley
Preceded by William Jackson	Financial Secretary to the Treasury; February 1886 – July 1886	Succeeded by William Jackson
Preceded by Charles Ritchie	President of the Local Government Board; 1892–1894	Succeeded by George Shaw-Lefevre
Preceded by The Earl of Kimberley	Secretary of State for India; 1894–1895	Succeeded by Lord George Hamilton
Preceded by Sir William Walrond, Bt	Chancellor of the Duchy of Lancaster; 1905–1908	Succeeded by The Lord Fitzmaurice
Preceded by The Lord Tweedmouth	Lord President of the Council; 1908–1910	Succeeded by The Earl Beauchamp
Peerage of the United Kingdom
New creation	Viscount Wolverhampton; 1908–1911	Succeeded by Henry Fowler
