= Wolverhampton South East =

UK Parliament constituency (since 1974)

Coordinates: 52.57°N 2.07°W

- Borough constituency for the House of Commons
- Boundaries since 2024
- Boundary of Wolverhampton South East in West Midlands region
- County: West Midlands
- Electorate: 61,751 (December 2010)
- Major settlements: Wolverhampton (part); Willenhall; Darlaston; Bilston

Current constituency
- Created: 1974
- Member of Parliament: Pat McFadden (Labour)
- Seats: One
- Created from: Bilston

Wolverhampton South East is a constituency (Note: A borough constituency (for the purposes of election expenses and type of returning officer).) in West Midlands that was created in 1974. The seat has been represented in the House of Commons of the Parliament of the United Kingdom by Pat McFadden of the Labour Party since 2005. (Note: As with all constituencies, the constituency elects one Member of Parliament (MP) by the first past the post system of election at least every five years.) McFadden has served as Secretary of State for Work and Pensions under the government of Keir Starmer since 2025, previously serving as Chancellor of the Duchy of Lancaster from 2024.

== Boundaries ==
=== Historic ===
1974–1983: The County Borough of Wolverhampton wards of Bilston East, Bilston North, Blakenhall, Ettingshall, Parkfield, and Spring Vale.

1983–2010: The Metropolitan Borough of Wolverhampton wards of Bilston East, Bilston North, Blakenhall, East Park, Ettingshall, and Spring Vale.

2010–2024: The City of Wolverhampton wards of Bilston East, Bilston North, Blakenhall, East Park, Ettingshall, and Spring Vale, and the Metropolitan Borough of Dudley ward of Coseley East.

=== Current ===
Further to the 2023 periodic review of Westminster constituencies, which was based on the ward structure in place on 1 December 2020, and taking into account the local government boundary review in the City of Wolverhampton which came into effect in May 2023, the constituency comprises the following from the 2024 general election:

- The Metropolitan Borough of Walsall wards of: Bentley and Darlaston North; Darlaston South; Willenhall South.
- The City of Wolverhampton wards of: Bilston North; Bilston South; East Park; Ettingshall North; Ettingshall South & Spring Vale; and a small part of St Peters.

Significant changes to bring the electorate within the permitted range, with the town of Darlaston being transferred from Walsall South, and the town of Willenhall (Willenhall South ward) from Walsall North. This was partly offset by the transfer of the City of Wolverhampton ward of Blakenhall to the re-established constituency of Wolverhampton West, and the Borough of Dudley ward of Coseley East to the newly created seat of Tipton and Wednesbury.

Wolverhampton South East is one of three constituencies in the city of Wolverhampton, covering eastern and south-eastern parts of the city. The constituency includes the towns of Willenhall, Darlaston and Bilston.

The boundaries run south from the city centre towards Blakenhall and Goldthorn Park, and east towards Bentley and Darlaston. Since the 2010 general election, it has also included a small part of the Metropolitan Borough of Dudley. Since the 2024 general election, it has also included a part of the Metropolitan Borough of Walsall and no longer included a part of the Metropolitan Borough of Dudley.

== History ==
The constituency was established in 1974, in part replacing the former Bilston constituency. It has returned Labour MPs throughout its existence, thus making it unique amongst Wolverhampton's three current constituencies. Bob Edwards of the Labour and Co-operative parties, who had represented Bilston since 1955, was the constituency's first MP. He served until 1987, when he was succeeded by Dennis Turner (also Labour Co-operative), who stood down in 2005. Pat McFadden of the Labour Party has been the MP since then. Following the 2019 general election, it is the only one of the three Wolverhampton seats to be held by Labour. The last time this was the case was in the 1987-92 Parliament, when the same two of the three Wolverhampton seats were Conservative-held.

== Members of Parliament ==
Bilston prior to 1974

Election	Member	Party
Feb 1974	Robert Edwards	Labour Co-op
1987	Dennis Turner	Labour Co-op
2005	Pat McFadden	Labour

== Elections ==
=== Elections in the 2020s ===
General election 2024: Wolverhampton South East
Party	Candidate	Votes	%	±%
Labour	Pat McFadden	16,800	50.3	▲2.9
Reform	Carl Hardwick	7,612	22.8	▲16.9
Conservative	Victoria Wilson	5,654	16.9	▼24.3
Green	Paul Darke	1,643	4.9	▲3.2
Workers Party	Athar Warraich	915	2.7	new
Liberal Democrats	Bart Ricketts	758	2.3	▼1.5
Majority		9,188	27.5	▲23.8
Turnout		33,382	43.0	▼7.4
Labour hold		Swing	▲7.0	

=== Elections in the 2010s ===
2019 notional result
Party	Vote	%
Labour	18,116	47.4
Conservative	15,743	41.2
Brexit Party	2,263	5.9
Liberal Democrats	1,457	3.8
Green	648	1.7
Turnout	38,227	49.7
Electorate	76,902	

General election 2019: Wolverhampton South East
Party	Candidate	Votes	%	±%
Labour	Pat McFadden	15,522	46.4	−11.8
Conservative	Ahmed Ejaz	14,287	42.7	+7.9
Brexit Party	Raj Chaggar	2,094	6.3	New
Liberal Democrats	Ruth Coleman-Taylor	1,019	3.0	+1.8
Green	Kathryn Gilbert	521	1.6	+0.4
Majority		1,235	3.7	−19.7
Turnout		33,443	53.2	−7.0
Labour hold		Swing	−9.9	

General election 2017: Wolverhampton South East
Party	Candidate	Votes	%	±%
Labour	Pat McFadden	21,137	58.2	+4.9
Conservative	Kieran Mullan	12,623	34.8	+12.5
UKIP	Barry Hodgson	1,675	4.6	−15.7
Liberal Democrats	Ben Mathis	448	1.2	−1.1
Green	Amy Bertaut	421	1.2	−0.5
Majority		8,514	23.4	−7.6
Turnout		36,304	60.2	+4.6
Labour hold		Swing	−3.7	

General election 2015: Wolverhampton South East
Party	Candidate	Votes	%	±%
Labour	Pat McFadden	18,531	53.3	+5.6
Conservative	Suria Photay	7,764	22.3	−6.3
UKIP	Barry Hodgson	7,061	20.3	+12.6
Liberal Democrats	Ian Griffiths	798	2.3	−12.7
Green	Geeta Kauldhar	605	1.7	New
Majority		10,767	31.0	+11.9
Turnout		34,759	55.6	−1.7
Labour hold		Swing		

General election 2010: Wolverhampton South East
Party	Candidate	Votes	%	±%
Labour	Pat McFadden	16,505	47.7	−11.9
Conservative	Ken Wood	9,912	28.6	+5.7
Liberal Democrats	Richard Whitehouse	5,207	15.0	+2.7
UKIP	Gordon Fanthom	2,675	7.7	+2.5
Independent	Sudir Handa	338	1.0	New
Majority		6,593	19.1	−18.0
Turnout		34,637	57.3	+5.0
Labour hold		Swing	−8.8	

=== Elections in the 2000s ===
General election 2005: Wolverhampton South East
Party	Candidate	Votes	%	±%
Labour	Pat McFadden	16,790	59.4	−8.0
Conservative	James Fairbairn	6,295	22.3	+0.5
Liberal Democrats	David Murray	3,682	13.0	+4.2
UKIP	Kevin Simmons	1,484	5.3	New
Majority		10,495	37.1	−8.5
Turnout		28,251	52.3	+1.0
Labour hold		Swing	−4.2	

General election 2001: Wolverhampton South East
Party	Candidate	Votes	%	±%
Labour Co-op	Dennis Turner	18,409	67.4	+3.7
Conservative	Adrian Pepper	5,945	21.8	+1.6
Liberal Democrats	Pete Wild	2,389	8.8	−0.6
National Front	James Barry	554	2.0	New
Majority		12,464	45.6	+2.1
Turnout		27,297	51.3	−12.8
Labour Co-op hold		Swing		

=== Elections in the 1990s ===
General election 1997: Wolverhampton South East
Party	Candidate	Votes	%	±%
Labour Co-op	Dennis Turner	22,202	63.7	+7.0
Conservative	William Hanbury	7,020	20.2	−11.5
Liberal Democrats	Richard Whitehouse	3,292	9.4	−0.1
Referendum	Trevor Stevenson-Platt	980	2.8	New
Socialist Labour	Nick Worth	689	2.0	New
Liberal	Kenneth Bullman	647	1.9	0.0
Majority		15,182	43.5	+18.5
Turnout		34,830	64.1	−8.8
Labour Co-op hold		Swing		

General election 1992: Wolverhampton South East
Party	Candidate	Votes	%	±%
Labour Co-op	Dennis Turner	23,215	56.7	+7.8
Conservative	Philip Bradbourn	12,975	31.7	−1.4
Liberal Democrats	Richard Whitehouse	3,881	9.5	−8.5
Liberal	Catherine Twelvetrees	850	1.9	New
Majority		10,240	25.0	+9.2
Turnout		40,921	72.9	+0.4
Labour Co-op hold		Swing	+4.6	

=== Elections in the 1980s ===
General election 1987: Wolverhampton South East
Party	Candidate	Votes	%	±%
Labour Co-op	Dennis Turner	19,760	48.9	+4.2
Conservative	John Mellor	13,362	33.1	+1.2
Alliance (Liberal)	Richard Whitehouse	7,258	18.0	−5.4
Majority		6,398	15.8	+3.0
Turnout		40,380	72.5	+3.4
Labour Co-op hold		Swing		

General election 1983: Wolverhampton South East
Party	Candidate	Votes	%	±%
Labour Co-op	Bob Edwards	17,440	44.7	−11.0
Conservative	Patrick McLoughlin	12,428	31.9	−2.6
Alliance (Liberal)	Joseph Wernick	9,112	23.4	+16.7
Majority		5,012	12.8	−8.4
Turnout		38,980	69.1	0.0
Labour Co-op hold		Swing	−4.7	

=== Elections in the 1970s ===
General election 1979: Wolverhampton South East
Party	Candidate	Votes	%	±%
Labour Co-op	Bob Edwards	20,798	55.7	−3.0
Conservative	P. A. Chalkley	12,807	34.5	+7.8
Liberal	M. L. Parsley	2,499	6.7	−3.2
National Front	G. J. Jones	1,139	3.1	−1.6
Majority		7,901	21.2	−10.8
Turnout		37,153	69.1	+3.1
Labour Co-op hold		Swing		

General election October 1974: Wolverhampton South East
Party	Candidate	Votes	%	±%
Labour Co-op	Bob Edwards	21,466	58.7	+3.8
Conservative	E. Holt	9,768	26.7	−0.7
Liberal	B. Norcott	3,636	9.9	−4.0
National Front	G. Oldland	1,703	4.7	+0.8
Majority		11,698	32.0	+4.5
Turnout		36,573	66.0	−6.2
Labour Co-op hold		Swing		

General election February 1974: Wolverhampton South East
Party	Candidate	Votes	%	±%
Labour Co-op	Bob Edwards	21,746	54.9	
Conservative	J.S. Heath	10,841	27.4	
Liberal	T. Bamford	5,511	13.9	
National Front	J. Parker	1,546	3.9	
Majority		10,905	27.5	
Turnout		39,644	72.2	
Labour Co-op win (new seat)				

== See also ==
- List of Members of Parliament for Wolverhampton
- List of parliamentary constituencies in Wolverhampton
- List of parliamentary constituencies in the West Midlands (county)
