= List of parliamentary constituencies in Wolverhampton =

This is a list of parliamentary constituencies in the city of Wolverhampton in the West Midlands of England.

1832–1885

- Wolverhampton (2 seats)

1885–1918

- Wolverhampton East
- Wolverhampton South
- Wolverhampton West

1918-1950

- Bilston
- Wolverhampton East
- Wolverhampton West

1950-1974

- Bilston
- Wolverhampton North East
- Wolverhampton South West

1974–2024

- Wolverhampton North East
- Wolverhampton South East
- Wolverhampton South West

2024–present

- Wolverhampton North East
- Wolverhampton South East
- Wolverhampton West

== See also ==
- List of Members of Parliament for Wolverhampton
