= Viscount Wolverhampton =

Extinct viscountcy in the Peerage of the United Kingdom

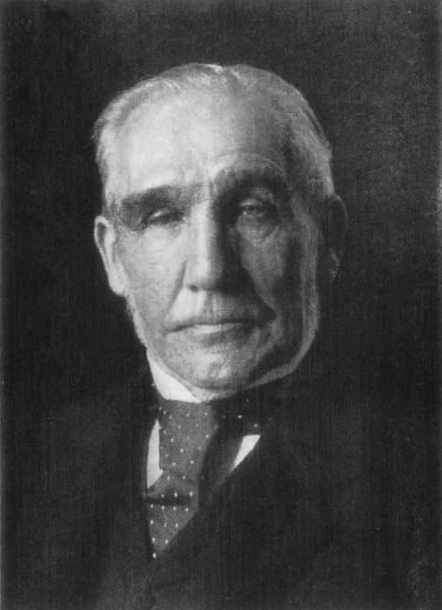
Henry Fowler, 1st Viscount Wolverhampton.

Viscount Wolverhampton, of Wolverhampton in the County of Stafford, was a title in the Peerage of the United Kingdom. It was created on 4 May 1908 for the Liberal politician Henry Fowler. The title became extinct on the death of his son, the second Viscount, on 9 March 1943.

Ellen Thorneycroft Fowler and Edith Henrietta Fowler, daughters of the first Viscount, were both authors.

== Viscounts Wolverhampton (1908) ==
- Henry Hartley Fowler, 1st Viscount Wolverhampton (1830–1911)
- Henry Ernest Fowler, 2nd Viscount Wolverhampton (1870–1943)

== Arms ==
Coat of arms of Viscount Wolverhampton
Crest Upon a rock a stork Argent holding in the beak a cross-moline Sable. Escutcheon Per pale Gules and Sable on a chevron between in chief two lions passant and in base a portcullis all Argent a rose of the first barbed and seeded Proper. Supporters Dexter a wolf Or charged on the shoulder with an escutcheon Gules thereon two keys in saltire wards upwards Argent sinister a Royal tiger Or striped Sable charged on the shoulder with an escutcheon Azure thereon an estoile Argent. Motto In Te Domine Speravi
