= Ian Hannah =

Ian Campbell Hannah (16 December 1874 – 7 July 1944) was a British academic, writer and Conservative Party politician.

== Background ==
He was born in Chichester, the eldest son of Rev. Prebendary John Julius Hannah, the Vicar of Brighton and later Dean of Chichester. He was educated at Windlesham House School, Winchester College and Trinity College, Cambridge. In 1899 his younger brother, William, became one of the early casualties of the Second Boer War when he was killed by a falling shell the day after the Battle of Talana Hill.

Hannah was president of the University of King's College, in Windsor, Nova Scotia, from 1904 to 1906. In 1904 he married American artist Edith Brand. After a spell in England, Hannah returned to America in 1915 to become professor of church history at the Oberlin Theological Seminary. He returned to the UK again in 1925, to live on his family estate near Edinburgh.

He first stood for parliament as a Liberal candidate for Sunderland at the 1924 General Election, without success. He was elected as Conservative member of parliament (MP) for Bilston at the 1935 general election and held the seat until he died in office in 1944 aged 69.

Hannah published several books, many with illustrations by his wife, including Sussex (1912), Berwick and the Lothians (1913), The Heart of East Anglia, and Capitals of the Northlands (1914), and The Story of Scotland in Stone (1934). He was also a member and frequent speaker at the Sussex Archaeological Society, producing articles on the Prebendal School in Chichester, the Vicars' Close at Chichester and on the town of Crawley, and later on the houses of Chichester Close, Brabletye and West Hothly.

Parliament of the United Kingdom
Preceded by Geoffrey Peto	Member of Parliament for Bilston; 1935–1944	Succeeded by William Gibbons
