= George Thorne (politician) =

Opposition Chief Whip in the House of Commons
- In office 4 February 1919 – 15 November 1922
- Leader: Donald Maclean; H. H. Asquith
- Preceded by: John Gulland
- Succeeded by: Arthur Henderson

Chief Whip of the Liberal Party
- In office 4 February 1919 – 12 February 1923
- Leader: Donald Maclean; H. H. Asquith
- Preceded by: John Gulland
- Succeeded by: Vivian Phillipps

Member of Parliament for Wolverhampton East
- In office 5 May 1908 – 30 May 1929
- Preceded by: Henry Fowler
- Succeeded by: Geoffrey Mander

Personal details
- Born: George Rennie Thorne; 12 October 1853 Longside, Aberdeenshire, Scotland, UK
- Died: 20 February 1934 (aged 80) Wolverhampton, Staffordshire, England, UK
- Party: Liberal
- Spouse: Susan Mary Jones
- Education: Tettenhall College
- Occupation: Solicitor

George Rennie Thorne (12 October 1853 – 20 February 1934) was a British solicitor and Liberal Party politician.

== Early life and career ==
Thorne was educated at Tettenhall College, Wolverhampton and became a solicitor in 1876. He went on to become senior member of the law form G R Thorne & Sons of Wolverhampton and London.

== Political career ==
=== Local politics ===
Thorne entered local politics in Wolverhampton being a Borough Councillor for many years and later an Alderman. He was Mayor of Wolverhampton in 1902-03 representing the Liberal party, and Chairman of South Staffordshire Joint Smallpox Hospital from its formation. He also served as a Justice of the Peace.

=== Wolverhampton East by-election, 1908 ===
Thorne had stood unsuccessfully for election twice in the South and West divisions of Wolverhampton before getting elected in 1908 at by-election on 5 May to succeed Sir Henry Fowler who had been made a peer.

In nearly every way Thorne seemed the stereotypical Liberal of his day; a pronounced nonconformist, a Baptist, in a constituency where there were many nonconformist voters. In his election meetings and literature he declared himself a supporter of Free Trade, the proposed Bill on Old Age Pensions, restricting to eight the hours that miners could be made to work daily, women's suffrage, Irish Home Rule and any necessary reform of the House of Lords. He was also strongly in favour of temperance and a supporter of the disestablishment of the Church of England.

Thorne won the by-election by a majority of just eight votes from the Unionist candidate Leo Amery. One of reasons it was such a narrow margin was the policy of the Suffragettes at this time to oppose the candidates of the Liberal government because they would not bring in a Bill to provide votes for women. This was despite the individual views of the candidates, many of whom, like Thorne, were pro-women's suffrage. In this election, a Mrs Lois Dawson, who had incorrectly been placed on the electoral register as Louis Dawson, was allowed to vote by a very surprised polling station presiding officer, as she was clearly on the electoral roll. Her vote was allowed to stand, although had there been a court scrutiny of the election result it would almost certainly have been rejected.

=== Member of Parliament ===
Thorne held his seat at every general election after the by-election before announcing he would stand down in 1929. In 1919 he was appointed joint Chief Whip of the Independent Liberals led by H H Asquith (who was not a member of the House of Commons at the time, having lost his seat at the General Election) and held the post until 1923. In that year he was the vice-chairman of Liberal Parliamentary Party.

== Personal life and death ==
In 1886, he married Susan Mary Jones and they had two daughters.

He died on 20 February 1934, of a heart attack.

== See also ==
- List of Liberal Party (UK) MPs

== Image links ==
- George Rennie Thorne at the National Portrait Gallery

Parliament of the United Kingdom
Preceded by Henry Fowler	Member of Parliament for Wolverhampton East; 1908–1929	Succeeded by Geoffrey Mander
Party political offices
Preceded by John Gulland	Liberal Chief Whip; 1919–1923; With: James Hogge	Succeeded by Vivian Phillipps
Civic offices
Preceded by Charles Paulton Plant	Mayor of Wolverhampton; 1902–1903	Succeeded by Levi Johnson
