= Will Nally =

British politician (1914–1965)

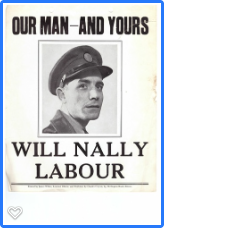

Will Nally (13 December 1914 – 4 August 1965) was a British Labour and Co-operative Party politician.

Nally joined the Labour League of Youth, and served as president of its Manchester district from 1930 to 1934. He then worked as a journalist, and served as a gunner in the Royal Artillery, then as a war correspondent during World War II. He was elected as the Member of Parliament for the Bilston constituency at the 1945 general election.

Nally stood down at the 1955 general election, citing the problem of splitting his time between his constituency in Wolverhampton, Parliament at Westminster, and his family home in Manchester. He was nominated for selection for the seat of Manchester Gorton but was not short-listed.

Parliament of the United Kingdom
Preceded by William Gibbons	Member of Parliament for Bilston; 1945–1955	Succeeded by Bob Edwards
