= William Gibbons (British politician) =

British politician (1898–1976)

William Ernest Gibbons (24 April 1898 – 15 August 1976) was a British Conservative Party politician. He won the Bilston constituency at a by-election in 1944, but was defeated nine months later at the 1945 general election by Will Nally in the national Labour landslide of that year.

== See also ==
- List of United Kingdom MPs with the shortest service
- UK by-election records

Parliament of the United Kingdom
Preceded by Ian Hannah	Member of Parliament for Bilston; September 1944–July 1945	Succeeded by Will Nally
