= John Lloyd Gibbons =

John Lloyd Gibbons, JP

Member of Parliament for Wolverhampton South
- In office 3 February 1898 – 2 October 1900
- Preceded by: Charles Pelham Villiers
- Succeeded by: Sir Henry Norman

Personal details
- Born: 25 August 1837 Wolverhampton, Staffordshire, England
- Died: 25 April 1919 (aged 81) Dudley, Worcestershire, England
- Spouse(s): 1. Emma Eliza White; (1885 – 1896); 2. Eliza Grey Ballenden (1899 – His death)
- Parent(s): Henry Gibbons and Elizabeth Saunders
- Occupation: Engineering Surveyor
- Known for: Liberal Unionist Party politician

John Lloyd Gibbons (25 August 1837 – 25 April 1919) was an engineering surveyor, justice of the peace, county councillor for Bilston and a Liberal Unionist Party Member of Parliament for Wolverhampton South from 1898 to 1900.

== Background ==
Gibbons was born on 25 August 1837 to Wolverhampton-born manufacturing chemist Henry Gibbons and his wife Elizabeth (née Saunders) from Wednesfield, Staffordshire.

He married Emma Eliza White of Stroud, Gloucestershire in 1885 in Wolverhampton.; she died in 1896. He remarried in 1898 to Eliza Grey Ballenden of Sedgley, Staffordshire.

== Politics and public life ==
Gibbons was county magistrate for the Sedgley Petty Sessions Division.

He was elected as County Councillor for North Bilston in 1891, the same year that the family took up residence at Ellowes Hall, a stately home located in Sedgley, Staffordshire.

He was elected as member of parliament for Wolverhampton South at the 3 February 1898 by-election following the death of Charles Pelham Villiers on 16 January 1898.

== Personal life ==
Gibbons died on 25 April 1919 and was buried at All Saints Church, Sedgley. His widow sold Ellowes Hall later the same year.

Parliament of the United Kingdom
| Preceded by Charles Pelham Villiers | Member of Parliament for Wolverhampton South; 1898–1900 | Succeeded by Sir Henry Norman |
