= Dennis Turner =

British politician (1942–2014)

The Right Honourable The Lord Bilston

Member of Parliament for Wolverhampton South East
- In office 11 June 1987 – 11 April 2005
- Preceded by: Robert Edwards
- Succeeded by: Pat McFadden

Member of the House of Lords
- Lord Temporal
- Life peerage 20 June 2005 – 25 February 2014

Personal details
- Born: Dennis Turner; 26 August 1942 Bradley, West Midlands, England
- Died: 25 February 2014 (aged 71) Wolverhampton, West Midlands, England
- Party: Labour and Co-operative
- Spouse: Patricia Narroway (m. 1976)
- Children: 2

Dennis Turner, Baron Bilston (26 August 1942 – 25 February 2014) was a British Labour Co-operative politician who served as Member of Parliament (MP) for Wolverhampton South East from 1987 to 2005.

== Early life ==
Turner was born in Bradley in the Black Country and lived there his entire life. He was the son of Thomas Herbert Turner and Mary Elizabeth Peasley. He was educated at Stonefield Secondary Modern School (now South Wolverhampton and Bilston Academy) on Prosser Street in Bilston and Bilston College of Further Education (now part of City of Wolverhampton College), worked as a market trader and steelworker, and later ran a social club. He was a strong trades unionist. He was one of the youngest-ever councillors on Wolverhampton Council from 1966, rising through the ranks to become deputy leader for seven years. He was Director of Springvale Co-operative Leisure Centre. He was on West Midlands County Council from 1973 to 1986.

== Parliamentary career ==
Turner contested Halesowen and Stourbridge in the February and October general elections in 1974.

He was elected member of Parliament for Wolverhampton South East at the 1987 general election. He never held high office, serving as an opposition whip then as Parliamentary Private Secretary to Clare Short at the Department for International Development. He also campaigned on issues of Fairtrade and further education, and chaired the Commons Catering Committee. He chaired the Co-op Parliamentary Group for two years and the West Midlands group of Labour MPs. He once introduced a private member's bill seeking to make clear in law the correct amount of froth at the top of a pint of beer.

Turner stepped down from Parliament at the 2005 general election; he announced his retirement at a very late stage, citing an impending lung operation on a collapsed diaphragm. Pat McFadden was selected to replace him.

On 13 May 2005 it was announced that he would be created a life peer, and on 20 June 2005 the title was created as Baron Bilston, of Bilston in the County of West Midlands. Turner later revealed that this choice of title was a mistake, and he had intended to take the title Baron Turner of Bilston.

== Personal life ==
Lord Bilston was a Distinguished Supporter of the British Humanist Association.

He married Patricia Narroway in 1976 and had a son and a daughter.

Lord Bilston died in Wolverhampton on 25 February 2014, aged 71.

Parliament of the United Kingdom
Preceded by Bob Edwards	Member of Parliament for Wolverhampton South East; 1987–2005	Succeeded by Pat McFadden
