= T. E. Hickman =

Brigadier-General T. E. Hickman CB DSO

Member of Parliament for Wolverhampton Bilston Wolverhampton South (1910–1918)
- In office 15 January 1910 – 15 November 1922
- Preceded by: Sir Henry Norman
- Succeeded by: Charles Howard-Bury

Personal details
- Born: Thomas Edgecumbe Hickman; 25 July 1859
- Died: 23 October 1930 (aged 71)
- Party: Conservative
- Parent: Alfred Hickman (father)
- Education: Cheltenham School

Brigadier-General Thomas Edgecumbe Hickman, CB, DSO (25 July 1859 – 23 October 1930) was a British Army officer and Conservative Party politician.

== Early life and career ==
Hickman was one of sixteen children of Sir Alfred Hickman, industrialist and member of parliament for Wolverhampton West and was educated at Cheltenham School.

== Military career ==
In 1881 he was commissioned as a lieutenant in the 36th (Herefordshire) Regiment of Foot, which became the 2nd Battalion of the Worcestershire Regiment in July of the same year. From 1884 to 1894 and again from 1896 to 1900 he was attached to the Egyptian Army, serving in the Camel Corps during the Mahdist War. He was awarded the Osminieh Order (fourth class) and Order of the Medjidie (fourth class) by the Khedive of Egypt, and made a Companion of the Distinguished Service Order (DSO). During these years he was promoted to captain on 25 July 1888, received a brevet appointment as major on 18 November 1896, a brevet appointment as lieutenant colonel on 16 November 1898, the substantive promotion to the rank of major on 14 February 1900, and the brevet appointment as colonel on 14 March 1900. That year he transferred to South Africa to serve in the Second Boer War, which had started in October 1899. He was appointed a Companion of the Most Honourable Order of the Bath (Military Division) in April 1901.

Following the end of the war in June 1902, he stayed on in South Africa as Colonel on the Staff for the Eastern sub district in the Cape Colony district command. He remained in South Africa until 1908. He was placed on half-pay on return to the United Kingdom, and officially retired from the army with the rank of brigadier-general in April 1914.

== Political career ==
Hickman entered politics, and was elected as Conservative Member of Parliament for Wolverhampton South at the general election of January 1910. He held the seat until its abolition at the 1918 general election. With the outbreak of World War I Hickman returned to the army, and was appointed general officer commanding the 109th Brigade, 36th (Ulster) Division, in September 1914. He remained with the brigade in France until 1916, then involving himself in recruitment activities.

At the 1918 general election he was elected as Coalition Conservative MP for the new seat of Wolverhampton Bilston. He retired from parliament at the next election in 1922.

== Personal life ==
He was the director of a number of companies and was master of the Albrighton Hunt. He died at his residence, Wergs Hall, near Wolverhampton, aged 71.

Parliament of the United Kingdom
Preceded by Sir Henry Norman	Member of Parliament for Wolverhampton South; January 1910–1918	Constituency abolished
New constituency	Member of Parliament for Wolverhampton Bilston; 1918–1922	Succeeded by Charles Howard-Bury
