= Wolverhampton East (constituency) =

Parliamentary constituency in the United Kingdom, 1885–1950

- Former borough constituency for the House of Commons

1885–1950
- Seats: one
- Created from: Wolverhampton
- Replaced by: Wolverhampton North East and Wolverhampton South West

Wolverhampton East was a parliamentary constituency in the town of Wolverhampton in Staffordshire, England. It returned one Member of Parliament (MP) to the House of Commons of the Parliament of the United Kingdom.

== History ==
The constituency was created by the Redistribution of Seats Act 1885 for the 1885 general election, when the former two-seat Wolverhampton constituency was divided into three single-member constituencies.

It was abolished for the 1950 general election.

== Boundaries ==
1885–1918: The Borough of Wolverhampton wards of St James's, St Mary's, and St Peter's, and the parishes of Wednesfield and Willenhall.

1918–1950: The County Borough of Wolverhampton wards of St James's, St Mary's, and St Peter's, and the Urban Districts of Short Heath, Wednesfield, Wednesfield Heath, and Willenhall.

== Members of Parliament ==
Election	Member	Party
1885	Henry Fowler	Liberal
1908	George Thorne	Liberal
1929	Geoffrey Mander	Liberal
1945	John Baird	Labour
1950	constituency abolished	

== Election results ==
=== Elections in the 1880s ===
Henry Fowler

General election 1885: Wolverhampton East
Party	Candidate	Votes	%	±%
Liberal	Henry Fowler	3,935	59.8	
Conservative	Walter Bird	2,648	40.2	
Majority		1,287	19.6	
Turnout		6,583	83.2	
Registered electors		7,917		
Liberal win (new seat)				

General election 1886: Wolverhampton East
Party	Candidate	Votes	%	±%
Liberal	Henry Fowler	3,752	58.8	−1.0
Conservative	John Underhill	2,629	41.2	+1.0
Majority		1,123	17.6	−2.0
Turnout		6,381	80.6	−2.6
Registered electors		7,917		
Liberal hold		Swing	-1.0	

=== Elections in the 1890s ===
General election 1892: Wolverhampton East
Party	Candidate	Votes	%	±%
Liberal	Henry Fowler	Unopposed		
Liberal hold				

Fowler was appointed President of the Local Government Board, requiring a by-election.

By-election, 23 Aug 1892: Wolverhampton East
Party	Candidate	Votes	%	±%
Liberal	Henry Fowler	Unopposed		
Liberal hold				

General election 1895: Wolverhampton East
Party	Candidate	Votes	%	±%
Liberal	Henry Fowler	4,011	57.4	N/A
Conservative	Rupert Edward Cooke Kettle*	2,977	42.6	New
Majority		1,034	14.8	N/A
Turnout		6,988	82.7	N/A
Registered electors		8,446		
Liberal hold		Swing	N/A	

*some sources describe as Liberal Unionist

=== Elections in the 1900s ===
General election 1900: Wolverhampton East
Party	Candidate	Votes	%	±%
Liberal	Henry Fowler	Unopposed		
Liberal hold				

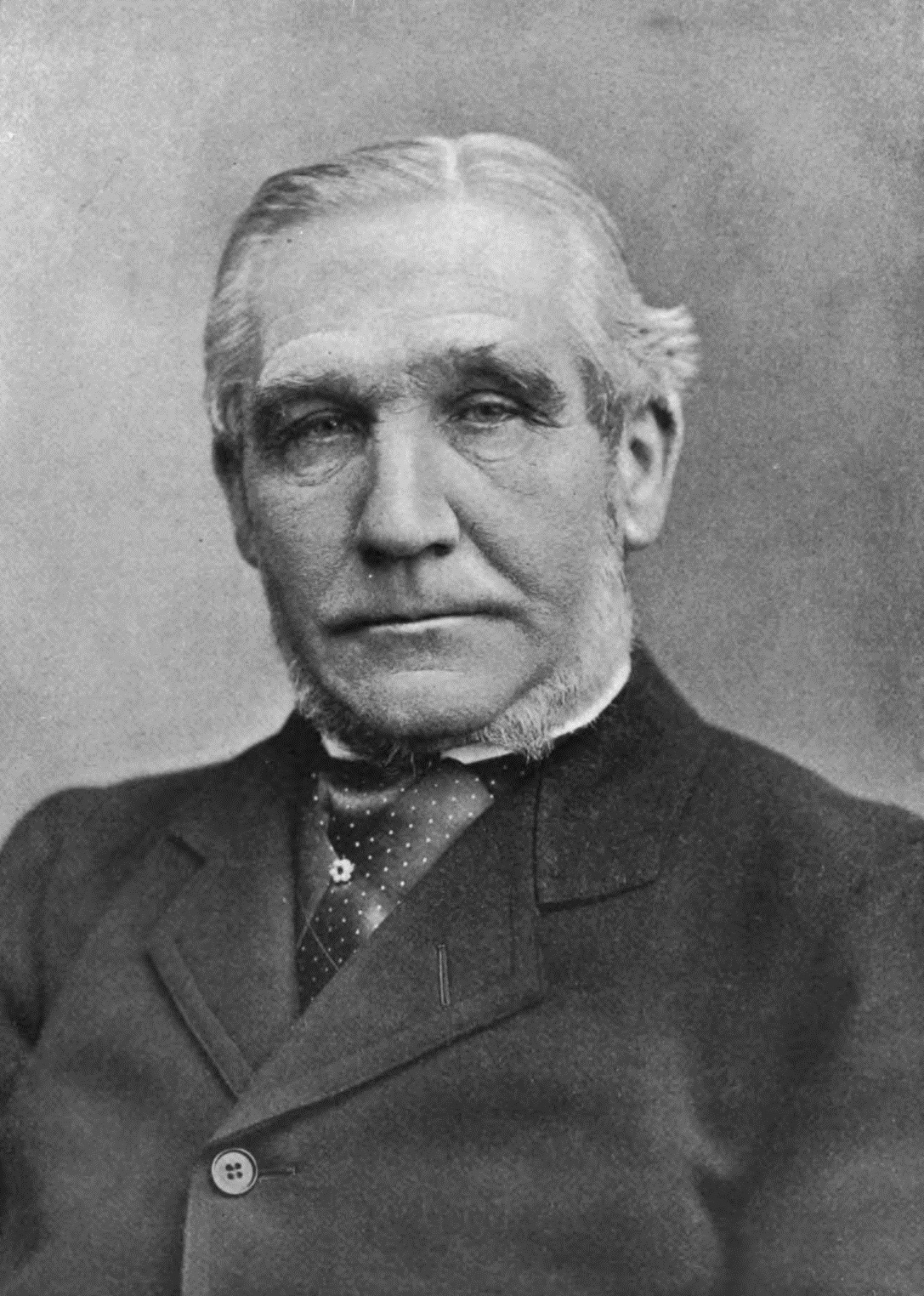
Henry Fowler

General election 1906: Wolverhampton East
Party	Candidate	Votes	%	±%
Liberal	Henry Fowler	5,610	67.1	N/A
Liberal Unionist	Leo Amery	2,745	32.9	New
Majority		2,865	34.2	N/A
Turnout		8,355	85.6	N/A
Registered electors		9,756		
Liberal hold		Swing	N/A	

George Thorne

1908 Wolverhampton East by-election
Party	Candidate	Votes	%	±%
Liberal	George Thorne	4,514	50.0	−17.1
Liberal Unionist	Leo Amery	4,506	50.0	+17.1
Majority		8	0.0	−34.2
Turnout		9,020	89.7	+4.1
Registered electors		10,058		
Liberal hold		Swing	−17.1	

=== Elections in the 1910s ===
General election January 1910: Wolverhampton East
Party	Candidate	Votes	%	±%
Liberal	George Thorne	5,276	54.2	−12.9
Liberal Unionist	Leo Amery	4,462	45.8	+12.9
Majority		814	8.4	−25.8
Turnout		9,738	95.1	+9.5
Registered electors		10,238		
Liberal hold		Swing	−12.9	

General election December 1910: Wolverhampton East
Party	Candidate	Votes	%	±%
Liberal	George Thorne	5,072	56.7	+2.5
Conservative	Robert Borras Whiteside	3,881	43.3	−2.5
Majority		1,191	13.4	+5.0
Turnout		8,953	87.4	−7.7
Registered electors		10,238		
Liberal hold		Swing	+2.5	

General Election 1914–15:

Another General Election was required to take place before the end of 1915. The political parties had been making preparations for an election to take place and by July 1914, the following candidates had been selected;

- Liberal: George Thorne
- Unionist: Ivor Windsor-Clive

General election 1918: Wolverhampton East
Party		Candidate	Votes	%	±%
	Liberal	George Thorne	7,660	51.8	−4.9
C	National Democratic	James A Shaw	7,138	48.2	New
Majority			522	3.6	−9.8
Turnout			14,798	48.6	−38.8
	Liberal hold		Swing		
C indicates candidate endorsed by the coalition government.

=== Elections in the 1920s ===
General election 1922: Wolverhampton East
Party	Candidate	Votes	%	±%
Liberal	George Thorne	11,577	45.9	−5.9
Unionist	Charles Henry Pinson	9,410	37.3	New
Labour	William Thomas Augustus Foot	3,076	12.2	New
National Liberal	James A Shaw	1,169	4.6	−43.6
Majority		2,167	8.6	+5.0
Turnout		25,232	80.4	+31.8
Liberal hold		Swing		

George Thorne

General election 1923: Wolverhampton East
Party	Candidate	Votes	%	±%
Liberal	George Thorne	Unopposed	N/A	N/A
Liberal hold				

General election 1924: Wolverhampton East
Party	Candidate	Votes	%	±%
Liberal	George Thorne	11,066	42.1	N/A
Unionist	Thomas Strangman	10,013	38.1	New
Labour	D Rowland Williams	5,188	19.8	New
Majority		1,053	4.0	N/A
Turnout		26,267	80.6	N/A
Liberal hold		Swing		

General election 1929: Wolverhampton East
Party	Candidate	Votes	%	±%
Liberal	Geoffrey Mander	15,391	44.8	+2.7
Unionist	Patrick Buchan-Hepburn	10,163	29.5	−8.6
Labour	D Rowland Williams	8,840	25.7	+5.9
Majority		5,228	15.3	+11.3
Turnout		34,394	81.5	+0.9
Liberal hold		Swing	+5.7	

=== Elections in the 1930s ===
General election 1931: Wolverhampton East
Party	Candidate	Votes	%	±%
Liberal	Geoffrey Mander	14,945	44.1	−0.7
Conservative	A T Waters-Taylor	12,628	37.2	+7.7
Labour	John Smith	6,340	18.7	−7.0
Majority		2,317	6.9	−8.4
Turnout		33,913	78.6	−2.9
Liberal hold		Swing	-4.2	

General election 1935: Wolverhampton East
Party	Candidate	Votes	%	±%
Liberal	Geoffrey Mander	15,935	48.5	+4.4
Conservative	J Brockhouse	11,935	36.3	−0.9
Labour	H E Lane	4,985	15.2	−3.5
Majority		4,000	12.2	+5.3
Turnout		32,855	73.3	−5.3
Liberal hold		Swing	+2.7	

=== Elections in the 1940s ===
A General election was due to take place before the end of 1940, but was postponed due to the Second World War. By 1939, the following candidates had been selected to contest this constituency;

- Liberal: Geoffrey Mander
- Conservative:

General election 1945: Wolverhampton East
Party	Candidate	Votes	%	±%
Labour	John Baird	17,763	47.7	+32.5
Liberal	Geoffrey Mander	11,206	30.1	−18.4
Conservative	William Garthwaite	8,266	22.2	−14.1
Majority		6,557	17.6	N/A
Turnout		37,235	73.3	0.0
Labour gain from Liberal		Swing		

== See also ==
- List of Members of Parliament for Wolverhampton
- List of parliamentary constituencies in Wolverhampton
