= Richard Fryer (politician) =

British politician

Member of Parliament for Wolverhampton
- In office 1832–1835
- Preceded by: New constituency
- Succeeded by: Thomas Thornely and Charles Pelham Villiers

Personal details
- Born: 11 November 1770
- Died: 8 August 1846 (aged 75)
- Occupation: Banker, landowner
- Known for: Whig politician

Richard Fryer (11 November 1770 – 8 August 1846) was a Staffordshire banker, landowner and British Whig politician. He held a seat in the House of Commons from 1832 to 1835, representing Wolverhampton.

== Background ==
Fryer was the son of Richard Fryer, of Wednesfield (b. 26 March 1719) and his wife Dorothea, daughter of John Wood of Wednesbury Hall, a descendant of the Hopes of Nechells Hall, Staffordshire, noted Royalists who supported Charles II, and granddaughter of William Wood (ironmaster). Fryer's grandfather, also Richard (b. 22 July 1698), was a descendant of the Fryers of Thornes, near Shenstone, where the family seat was an old hall surrounded by a moat.

He was a banker and one of the founders of the Union Flour Mill Company of Wolverhampton. He married heiress Mary Fleeming on 6 August 1794; she was the only child of William Fleeming, of The Wergs, Tettenhall, Wolverhampton. They lived at The Wergs Old Hall and had seven children, including Willian Fleeming Fryer who inherited the estates. The Fleemings were descendants of William Le Flemyng of Wightwick (born c.1271).

Following a series of poor harvests and the practicality of steam-powered milling a co-operative mill had been set up in Birmingham by 1796. A committee in Wolverhampton was formed by Fryer, who was the committee's first chairman, until Benjamin Mander took over after the first few months. Shares were offered to the public and the funds were raised to build a large steam-powered mill on the banks of the Birmingham Canal Navigations at Horseley Fields, Wolverhampton. Flour production began early in 1813, and bread production started later the same year.

Fryer had also purchased land on the corner of what is now Darlington Street and School Street, Wolverhampton. The local Methodists were looking to build a new church and the plot seemed ideal but there was opposition from Anglicans in the town fearing an increase in non-conformist influence. However Fryer was persuaded to sell for five shillings per square yard - £396 for the whole plot.

Fryer and his son William Fleeming Fryer were local bankers for Spooner & Co., now part of Barclays bank.

== Member of Parliament for Wolverhampton ==
After the Reform Act 1832, he was then elected at the 1832 general election as one of the two members for the newly enfranchised borough of Wolverhampton, and held that seat until he stood down at the 1835 general election.

== After Parliament ==
In 1845 Fryer obtained a lease of land from Lord Hatherton for a colliery and ironworks near Leamore Lane, Bloxwich, where two furnaces were built in the 1850s. Richard's son, William Fleeming Fryer, leased the works, then known as Hatherton furnaces, to G. and R. Thomas of Bloxwich.

Parliament of the United Kingdom
New constituency	Member of Parliament for Wolverhampton; 1832 – 1835; With: William Wolryche-Whitmore	Succeeded by Thomas Thornely; Charles Pelham Villiers
