= Ellen Thorneycroft Fowler =

English writer (1860–1929)

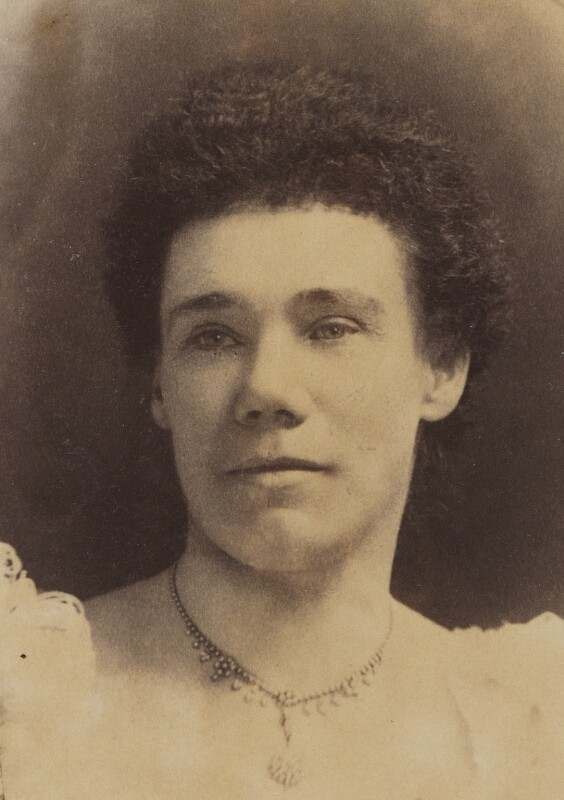
Fowler, c. 1902

Ellen Thorneycroft Fowler (9 April 1860 – 22 June 1929) was an English author of popular romances, and a poet and children's writer. She was a keen Methodist.

== Family and status ==
The elder daughter of Henry Hartley Fowler, 1st Viscount Wolverhampton, a Wesleyan MP, and his wife Ellen Thorneycroft, Ellen was born at Chapel Ash, Wolverhampton, on 9 April 1860. Her younger sister, Edith Henrietta Fowler (16 February 1865 – 18 November 1944), also wrote novels and a biography of her father.

On 16 April 1903, Ellen married Alfred Felkin, a senior teacher at the Royal Naval School at Mottingham near Eltham. She died on 22 June 1929 in Westbourne, Dorset aged 69.

Fowler became a member of the Writers' Club and the Women's Athenaeum Club. She was appointed a Fellow of the Royal Society of Literature.

== Verse and romances ==
Fowler's earliest volumes were Verses Grave and Gay (1891) and Verses Wise and Otherwise (1895), which were followed by a volume of short stories. Further poetry came in Love's Argument and Other Poems (1905). Of her romances, a present-day commentator has noted, "Fowler unusually combined Methodism with high society..., which proved popular despite leaving the critics cold." Fame came first with Concerning Isabel Carnaby (1898), then A Double Thread (1899), The Farringdons (1900), Fuel of Fire (1902), Place and Power (1903), Kate of Kate Hall (1904), In Subjection (1906), Miss Fallowfield's Fortune (1908), The Wisdom of Folly (1910), Her Ladyship's Conscience (1913), Ten Degrees Backward (1915), Beauty and Bands (1920) The Lower Pool (1923) and Signs and Wonders (1926).

== Edith Henrietta Fowler ==
Fowler's sister, Edith Henrietta Fowler, wrote two successful novels for children: The Young Pretenders (1895) and The Professor's Children (1897), and also The Man with Transparent Legs – Twenty six ideal stories for girls (1899).

The first of these was republished in London by Persephone Books in 2007, in view of its "sophistication, humour and ironies" of interest to both children and adults.
