= George Benjamin Thorneycroft =

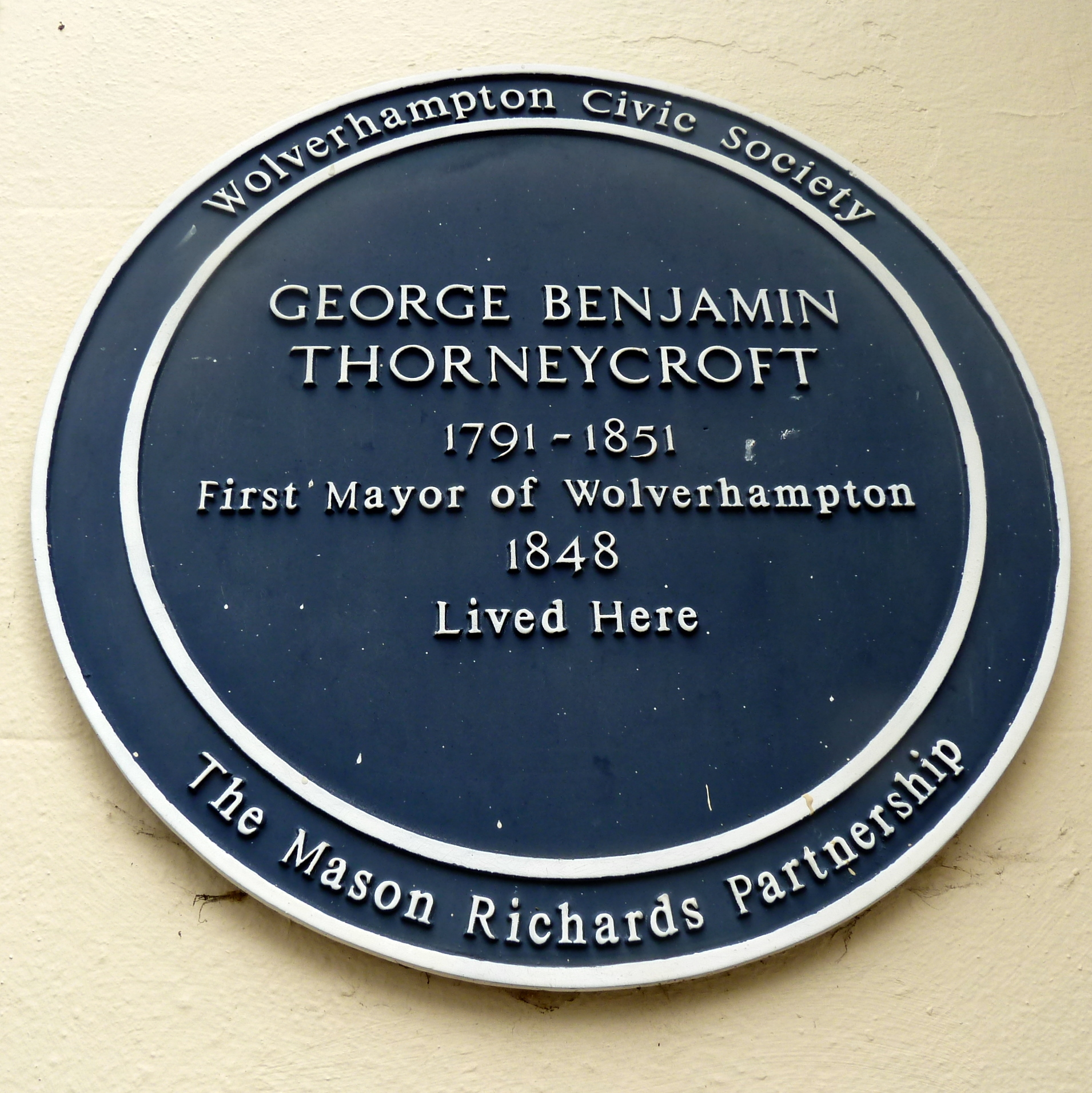
- Blue plaque at the former family home
- Born: 20 August 1791; Tipton, Staffordshire, England
- Died: 28 April 1851 (aged 59); Wolverhampton, Staffordshire, England
- Occupation: Ironmaster
- Known for: 1st Mayor of Wolverhampton

George Benjamin Thorneycroft (20 August 1791 – 28 April 1851) was a successful ironmaster and Tory supporter who became the first Mayor of Wolverhampton, after the Borough was incorporated, in 1848.

== Background and family ==
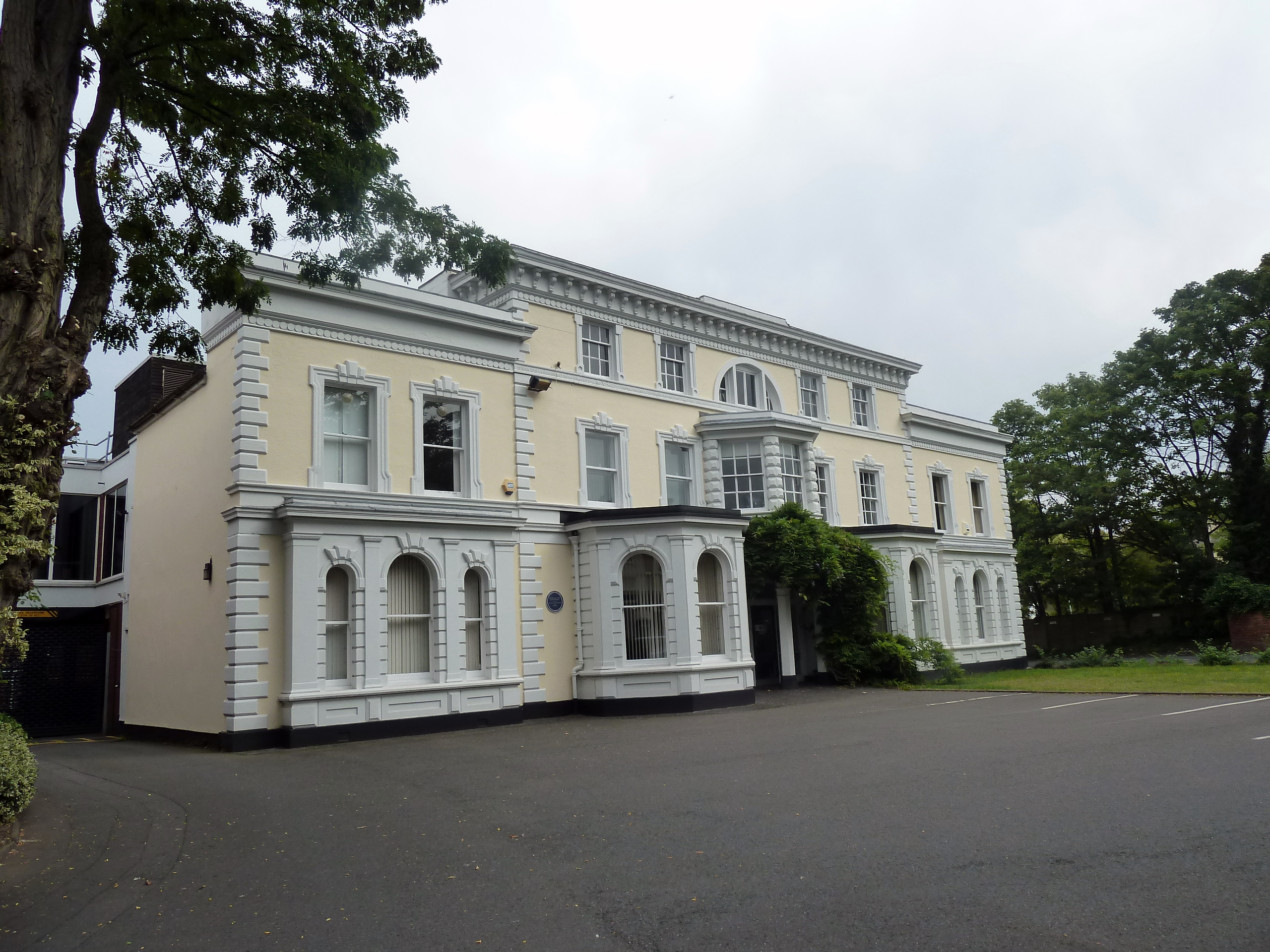
The former Chapel Ash House (now Salisbury House)

Thorneycroft was born in Tipton on 20 August 1791, where his parents ran the Three Furnaces public house. He married Eleanor Page of Moxley on 9 April 1814 and lived with his family at Chapel Ash House (now Salisbury House), Tettenhall Road, Wolverhampton. The house now bears a commemorative blue plaque.

Their only son Lieutenant-Colonel Thomas Thorneycroft (1822–1903) was High Sheriff of Staffordshire and a Yeomanry officer, and married Jane Whitelaw (1824–1908), daughter Alexander Whiteloaw, of Drumpark. They had five sons and four daughters, including Major-General Alexander Thorneycroft.

George and Eleanor`s second daughter, Emma (born March 1821), married John Hartley (1813-1884). Their fourth daughter, Ellen (born February 1830), married Henry Hartley Fowler.

== Iron and Steel ==
Thorneycroft moved to Leeds with his family and returned to Wolverhampton aged 18 with a basic knowledge of iron forging, which allowed him to join an established iron works in Bilston. In partnership with his twin brother, Edward, he founded Shrubbery Ironworks in Wolverhampton in 1824. From an initial production of 10 tons of iron a week George used his experience to expand the business and was soon producing 700 tons a week of high-quality iron. With skilful marketing he became a key supplier to the fast-expanding railway companies. The business continued to grow, even after Thorneycroft's death, and made large profits from production of armour plating and shells during the Crimean War. Along with other businesses in the town the works suffered during a slump in demand for iron and closed in 1877.

== Politics ==
He was an outspoken conservative and his growing stature saw his selection as the first Mayor of Wolverhampton after incorporation in 1848. He gave a silver gilt mace to the Corporation to mark his accession. A statue of Thorneycroft, by sculptor Thomas Thornycroft, now stands at the top of a staircase in the foyer of the old Town Hall.

Political offices
New creation	Mayor of Wolverhampton; 1848–1849	Succeeded by George Robinson
