= Wolverhampton South (constituency) =

Parliamentary constituency in the United Kingdom, 1885–1918

- Former borough constituency for the House of Commons

1885–1918
- Seats: one
- Created from: Wolverhampton
- Replaced by: Bilston

Wolverhampton South was a parliamentary constituency in the town of Wolverhampton in the West Midlands of England. It returned one Member of Parliament to the House of Commons of the Parliament of the United Kingdom.

== History ==
The constituency was created by the Redistribution of Seats Act 1885 for the 1885 general election, when the former two-seat Wolverhampton constituency was divided into three single-member constituencies.

It was abolished for the 1918 general election.

== Boundaries ==
The civil parish of Bilston, and part of the civil parish of Sedgley.

== Members of Parliament ==
Year	Member	Party
1885	Charles Pelham Villiers	Liberal
1886	Charles Pelham Villiers	Liberal Unionist
1898	John Lloyd Gibbons	Liberal Unionist
1900	Henry Norman	Liberal
1910	T. E. Hickman	Conservative
1918	constituency abolished	

== Elections ==
=== Elections in the 1880s ===
General election 1885: Wolverhampton South
Party	Candidate	Votes	%	±%
Liberal	Charles Villiers	Unopposed		
Liberal win (new seat)				

General election 1886: Wolverhampton South
Party	Candidate	Votes	%	±%
Liberal Unionist	Charles Villiers	Unopposed		
Liberal Unionist gain from Liberal				

=== Elections in the 1890s ===
General election 1892: Wolverhampton South
Party	Candidate	Votes	%	±%
Liberal Unionist	Charles Villiers	Unopposed		
Liberal Unionist hold				

General election 1895: Wolverhampton South
Party	Candidate	Votes	%	±%
Liberal Unionist	Charles Villiers	Unopposed		
Liberal Unionist hold				

Villiers' death caused a by-election.

George Thorne

1898 Wolverhampton South by-election
Party	Candidate	Votes	%	±%
Liberal Unionist	John Lloyd Gibbons	4,115	50.7	N/A
Liberal	George Rennie Thorne	4,004	49.3	New
Majority		111	1.4	N/A
Turnout		8,119	88.3	N/A
Registered electors		9,194		
Liberal Unionist hold		Swing	N/A	

=== Elections in the 1900s ===
Henry Norman

General election 1900: Wolverhampton South
Party	Candidate	Votes	%	±%
Liberal	Henry Norman	3,701	51.2	N/A
Liberal Unionist	W Oulton	3,532	48.8	N/A
Majority		169	2.4	N/A
Turnout		7,233	76.8	N/A
Registered electors		9,414		
Liberal gain from Liberal Unionist		Swing	N/A	

General election 1906: Wolverhampton South
Party	Candidate	Votes	%	±%
Liberal	Henry Norman	4,823	53.8	+2.6
Liberal Unionist	Charles Hyde Villiers (soldier)	4,137	46.2	−2.6
Majority		686	7.6	+5.2
Turnout		8,960	89.8	+13.0
Registered electors		9,974		
Liberal hold		Swing	+2.6	

=== Elections in the 1910s ===
General election January 1910: Wolverhampton South
Party	Candidate	Votes	%	±%
Conservative	T. E. Hickman	4,989	51.9	+5.7
Liberal	Henry Norman	4,619	48.1	−5.7
Majority		370	3.8	N/A
Turnout		9,608	93.7	+3.9
Registered electors		10,253		
Conservative gain from Liberal		Swing	N/A	

Arthur Lever

General election December 1910: Wolverhampton South
Party	Candidate	Votes	%	±%
Conservative	T. E. Hickman	4,784	51.9	0.0
Liberal	Arthur Lever	4,440	48.1	0.0
Majority		344	3.8	0.0
Turnout		9,224	90.0	−3.7
Registered electors		10,253		
Conservative hold		Swing	0.0	

== See also ==
- List of Members of Parliament for Wolverhampton
- List of parliamentary constituencies in Wolverhampton
