= Dudley Library =

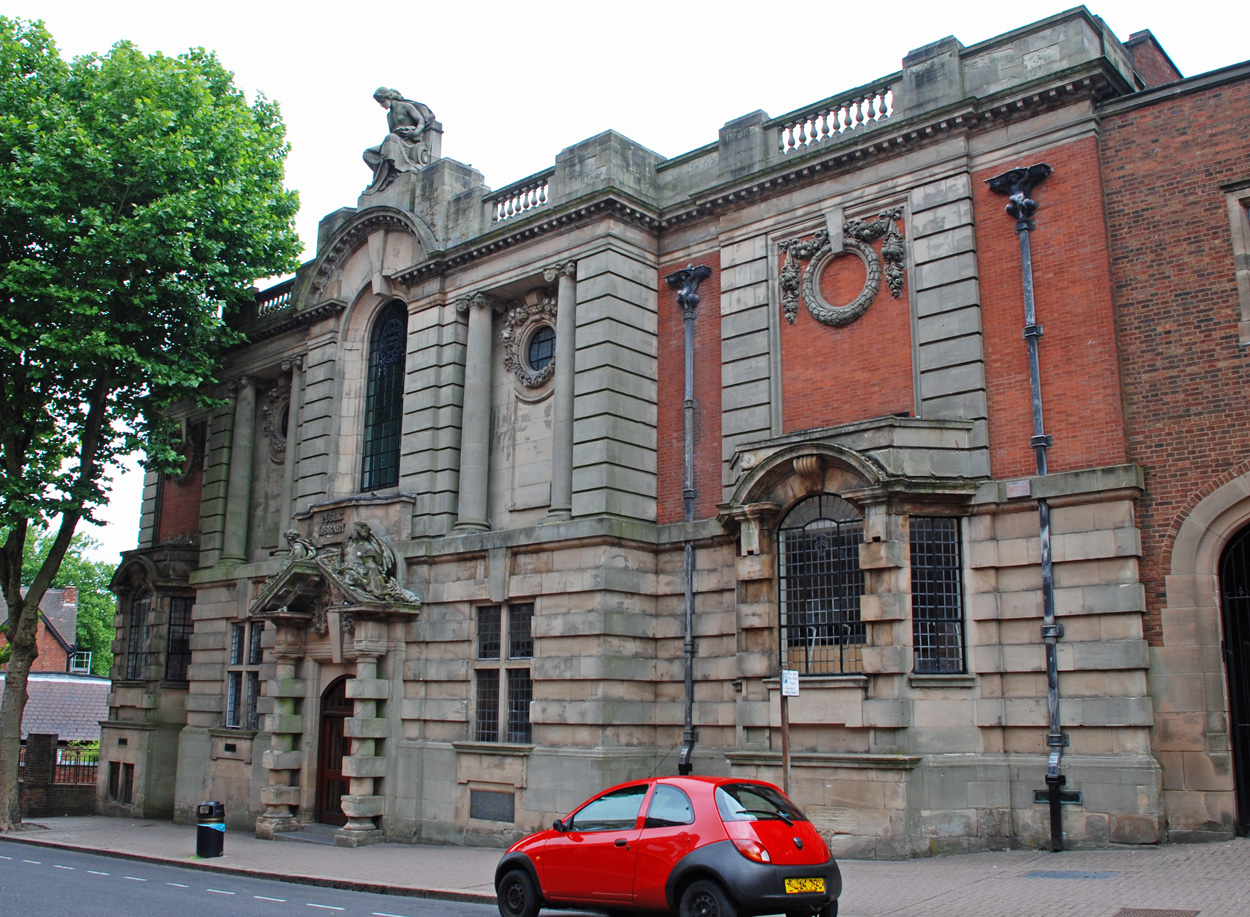
- Dudley Library
- Interactive map of the Dudley Library area

General information
- Type: Library
- Location: St James’s Road, Dudley, West Midlands, England
- Coordinates: 52°30′42″N 2°05′07″W
- Completed: September 1909

Renovating team
- Architect: George H. Wenyon

Listed Building – Grade II
- Designated: 09 April 1976
- Reference no.: 1287111

Dudley Library is a Grade II listed library in Dudley, West Midlands, England, that opened in September 1909.

== History ==
Dudley has had a public library since 1878, when the original library building was located in Priory Street. In 1909, a new library building was opened on St James's Road, designed by George H. Wenyon (who also designed Tipton District Library) after he won a competition to design the new library. The construction was paid for with a £7,500 donation from Andrew Carnegie. The foundation stone was laid on 26 June 1908 by the Countess of Dudley and the mayor, Councillor Cook. In September 1909 the new library was opened by John Hubert Ward, Equerry to King Edward VII. The statuary above the main entrance depicts "philosophy, science and the arts" and was installed by H. H Martyn & Co.

When the library first opened, it contained a reference library, a magazine room and a lending department. It also had research rooms, with a separate ladies' reading room on the first floor. Only library staff had access to the books on the shelves; lending books were requested and then delivered to borrowers in the central hall. Open access to the library was not permitted until 1933.

The library was modernised in 1933 and then again in 1947. In 1964, a four-storey extension was built to the rear of the building. A major refurbishment of the library was completed in 2002 and 2012.
