= Tipton Road =

Cricket ground in Dudley, England

Coordinates: 52°30′56.78″N 2°04′19.66″W

The Tipton Road cricket ground in Dudley, West Midlands was used for first-class cricket by Worcestershire County Cricket Club on 88 occasions between 1911 and 1971. The county also staged 14 List A games there between 1969 and 1977, all in the Sunday League, as well as a number of Second XI matches.

One match of the 1982 ICC Trophy was played at Tipton Road, but the game between East Africa and West Africa was abandoned without a result after East Africa had reached 53/2 from 25.1 overs.

== Collapse and closure ==
On 25 May 1985, 40-foot wide hole appeared on the cricket pitch, and Dudley Council immediately closed the cricket pitch and the rest of the sports centre.

The whole complex remained derelict until the late 1990s, when construction of the first buildings on the Castle Gate leisure and commercial complex began.

== Records ==
=== First-class ===
- Highest team total: 645/7 declared by Warwickshire v Worcestershire, 1914
- Lowest team total: 48 by Worcestershire v Gloucestershire, 1924
- Highest individual innings: 305 not out by Frank Foster for Warwickshire v Worcestershire, 1914
- Best bowling in an innings: 9-45 by Peter Jackson for Worcestershire v Somerset, 1935

=== List A ===
- Highest team total: 258/4 (40 overs) by Worcestershire v Sussex, 1972
- Lowest team total: 88 (32.1 overs) by Sussex v Worcestershire, 1972
- Highest individual innings: 121 by Glenn Turner for Worcestershire v Sussex, 1972
- Best bowling in an innings: 5-28 by David Acfield for Essex v Worcestershire, 1972
