= Tipton District Library =

Building in Tipton, England

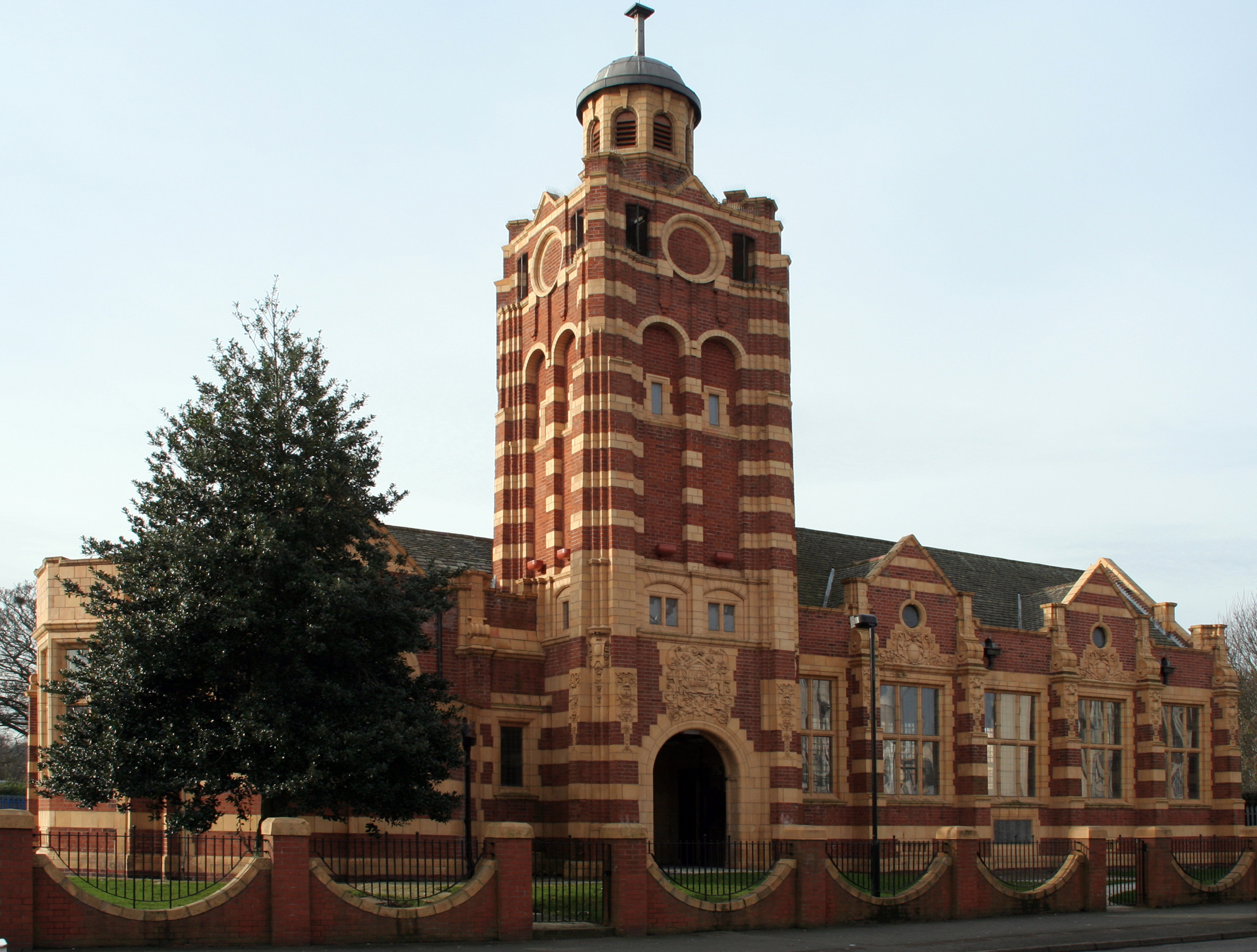
- Tipton District Library
- Interactive map of the Tipton District Library area

General information
- Location: Victoria road, Tipton, West Midlands
- Coordinates: 52°31′25.68″N 2°3′29.08″W
- Completed: 1906

Renovating team
- Architect: George H. Wenyon

Listed Building – Grade II
- Designated: 10 February 1982
- Reference no.: 1077095

Tipton District Library is a Grade II listed building on Victoria road, Tipton, West Midlands, England that opened in 1906.

== History ==
The library was a gift given to the town of Tipton by the Scottish born American philanthropist and historian Andrew Carnegie.

It was designed by George H. Wenyon (who also designed Dudley Library) and built in 1905 to the design of red brick with bands of yellow terracotta and a tile roof. A single storey building consisting of a large central tower that has corner buttresses and a domed lantern. It was opened to the public in 1906 by Councillor William Woolley Doughty, who later became the Chairman of Tipton Urban District Council. When opened, the library had an adult, junior and children’s library as well as several reading rooms.

The building was granted Grade II listed status in February 1982.

In 2000, the library closed to the public before being moved to a new library that had been built in Unity Walk. It was then used as Sandwell Council’s Occupational Health Unit before becoming Tipton Carnegie Centre in 2006.

In April 2024, Sandwell Council reopened the library in its original building after a petition signed by more than 900 locals, two years before, was handed to the council to save the building.
