= Mons Hill =

Coordinates: 52.53°N 2.095°W

Mons Hill is a hill situated in Dudley, West Midlands, England.

It is a wooded hill which straddles the border of Dudley and Sedgley, standing to the north of the much more famous Wren's Nest hill.

It was originally situated within the borders of Sedgley (then in the county of Staffordshire), but to allow the development of nearby land as the Priory Estate in 1926 the borders were altered and the hill has since been within the boundaries of Dudley (then in Worcestershire).

From 1965 until 1990, Mons Hill gave its name to a neighbouring secondary school which is now part of Dudley College.

Its shared name with Mons Road in the Kates Hill area of Dudley is a coincidence, as that road's name was taken from the Battle of Mons during World War I.
