= Joseph William Moss =

Joseph William Moss M.D. (1803–1862) was an English physician. He is known for his Manual of Classical Bibliography (1825).

== Life ==
Born at Dudley, then in Worcestershire, Moss matriculated at Magdalen Hall, Oxford, 21 March 1820. While an undergraduate he was preoccupied with classical bibliography. He graduated B.A. 1825, M.A. 1827, M.B. 1829, and settled in practice at Dudley.

Moss was elected Fellow of the Royal Society on 18 February 1830. In 1847 he moved from Dudley to Longdon, near Lichfield, and in 1848 to the Manor House, Upton Bishop, in Herefordshire. In 1853 he again moved, to Hill Grove House, Wells, Somerset, where he died 23 May 1862. By the end of his life he was regarded as an eccentric recluse.

== Works ==
Moss's Manual of Classical Bibliography, was, he said, sent to the press early in 1823. The work was published in 1825, in two volumes, containing over 1250 closely printed pages. Publicity material made comparisons with works of Guillaume-François Debure, the Manuel of Jacques Charles Brunet and the Introduction to the Knowledge of the Editions of the Classics of Thomas Frognall Dibdin; and claimed improvements over those of Edward Harwood and Michael Maittaire. In spite of omissions and mistakes, the Manual became a standard work of reference. Favourable reviews appeared, but the Literary Gazette (1825), in three articles, severely attacked the book. A reply from Moss was in the Gentleman's Magazine for September 1825: he admitted that he had borrowed the plan of his work from Dibdin. The Literary Magazine published a rejoinder.

The Manual was reprinted, with a new title-page, but with no corrections, in 1837, by Henry George Bohn. An inconsistent Supplement, compiled by the publisher, brought the lists down to 1836.
