= Dudley Sports Centre =

Dudley

Coordinates: 52°30′58″N 2°4′18″W

Dudley Sports Centre was an outdoor sports centre located in Dudley, West Midlands. It was laid out at the end of the 19th century and expanded in 1928 with the construction of a football ground on the site; which became the home of Dudley Town F.C, the town’s football team. There was also a cricket pitch, athletics field and public playing field.

Parts of the ground were affected by mining subsidence for much of the centre's existence.

It was finally shut on 25 May 1985 when a 40-foot wide hole appeared on the cricket pitch. All subsequent plans for sports to return to the centre had to be abandoned due to ongoing problems with subsidence.

By the early 1990s, Dudley Sports Centre was heavily overgrown and the site was fenced off for safety reasons, though no demolition work had yet taken place.

== Castle Gate complex ==
Clearance of the site began in 1998, in preparation for the construction of the Castle Gate complex; which would operate as a business and leisure park. This project had been on the council's agenda for at least six years.

In 2001, a McDonald's and Showcase cinema opened on the site, with Pizza Hut opening an outlet in 2002. The site now also consists of a bowling alley, Premier Inn, Frankie & Benny's, Nando’s, KFC, Burger King and Costa Coffee. The complex also has a Hungry Horse pub and Harvester restaurant as well as several units for commercial use.

In 2023, Dudley Council announced that the Dudley Police headquarters would be moved to a commercial unit on the complex from their previous headquarters in Bank Street, Brierley Hill.
