= Luke Tilt =

English footballer

Personal information
- Full name: Luke Graham Tilt
- Date of birth: 18 June 1988 (age 38)
- Place of birth: Dudley, England
- Position: Goalkeeper

Youth career
- Walsall

Senior career*
Years	Team	Apps	(Gls)
2005–2006	Walsall	1	(0)
2008–????	Willenhall Town		
- * Club domestic league appearances and goals

Luke Graham Tilt (born 18 June 1988) is an English former professional footballer, who played as a goalkeeper.

He played for Walsall and only made one first team appearance for Walsall at Brentford on 4 February 2006. The then manager of Walsall, Paul Merson, named Tilt on the substitutes bench for the first time in his career and after an injury to first choice keeper Andy Oakes, Merson was forced to put in Tilt for the second half where Brentford were winning 2–0 and lost the match 5–0, after Tilt conceded three goals from Paul Brooker, Sam Sodje and a Kevin O'Connor penalty. Merson was sacked soon after this game and Tilt was released in May 2006. He subsequently played for Northern Premier League team Willenhall Town.
