= Old Park Farm =

Residential area of Dudley, England

Coordinates: 52.5274°N 2.1029°W

Old Park Farm is a residential area of Dudley, West Midlands (formerly Worcestershire and Staffordshire), England.

It was developed in the early 1950s by Dudley County Borough council as a council housing estate in the extreme west of the town near the border with Sedgley (which the land on the estate had been part of until 1926) on rural land next to the Wren's Nest estate that had been built in the 1930s. Several private houses were built on the estate as well.

The estate consists of 'The Greens' (roads named after types of trees e.g. Beech Green, Ash Green). It was named after Old Park Farm which sat at the top of the estate on the site where the Pub existed (now newer housing) hence the name 'Old Park' Farm Estate.

Sycamore Green Primary School served the estate for some 50 years until its closure in 2006. Now in 2012 the school building still remains and what was the school field has now been converted into a Play Center for children in the area. Since 2000 a health centre has also served the estate.

== Famous residents ==
Its most famous former resident is Sam Allardyce, who is the former manager of the England national team (and a former manager of clubs including Sunderland A.F.C., Bolton Wanderers and Newcastle United, and in his playing career was on the books of clubs including Sunderland and Coventry City). He was born in a then new council house on Ash Green on 19 October 1954, moving away from the address when beginning his playing career in the early 1970s, though his mother remained there until her death in 1991.
