= Dudley bus station =

Bus station in Dudley, England

Coordinates: 52.5113°N 2.0796°W

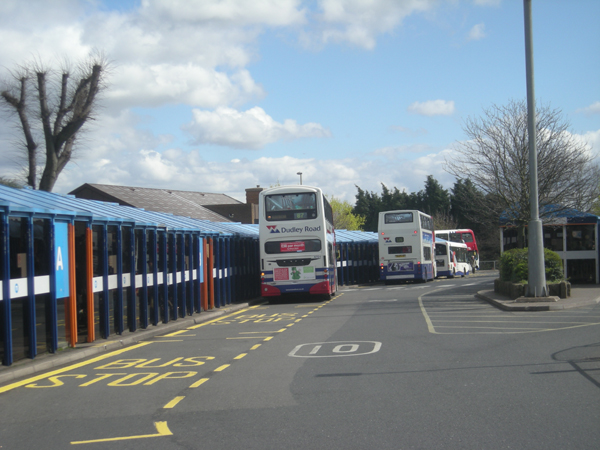
- Dudley bus station in April 2009

General information
- Location: Fisher Street, Dudley; England
- Owner: West Midlands Combined Authority
- Operator: Transport for West Midlands
- Bus routes: 22
- Bus stands: 19
- Bus operators: Banga Buses; Diamond West Midlands; National Express Coaches; West Midlands Bus

History
- Opened: 1986
Location

Dudley bus station is a bus station in Dudley, England. It is managed by Transport for West Midlands. Local bus and national coach services operated by various companies serve the bus station which has 19 departure stands.

The arrival stand is A and also on surrounding streets and the departures stands are lettered B - U (excluding I and O). U is allocated to long distance coach services, which are mainly pre-booked.

The original bus station was constructed along Birmingham Street on a steep hill overlooking Dudley Castle in about 1950. It was complemented by an additional line of shelters along neighbouring Fisher Street. However, a series on incidents of buses rolling back injuring passengers led to widespread local criticism of its design. This resulted in the West Midlands Passenger Transport Executive rebuilding the bus station on a completely level site along Fisher Street. Construction of the new bus station began during 1985 and it was opened in 1986.

The original lay-over facilities on adjacent Portersfield still remain to this day, on part of what is now a public car park. As at September 2022, the 19 stands were served by 22 routes.

The bus station is due to be redeveloped to create an interchange with the under construction West Midlands Metro line to Brierley Hill. Planning permission was granted in September 2022. Demolition of the bus station began in March 2024. The new Dudley Bus Station is due to open the public on Sunday 13th December 2026.

== Bus routes ==
Route	Destination	Via	Operator	Notes
1	Tettenhall Wood	Sedgley, Blakenhall, Wolverhampton	West Midlands Bus	
2/2A	Wrens Nest Merry Hill	Laurel Road Russells Hall, Brierley Hill	West Midlands Bus	
5/5A	Kingswinford & Wall Heath (5A)	Russells Hall, Pensnett	National Express West Midlands	was Diamond until 2/11/25
6	Stourbridge	Russells Hall, Brierley Hill, Amblecote	West Midlands Bus	
7	Wollaston Junction	Merry Hill, Lye, Pedmore, Stourbridge, Norton	West Midlands Bus	
8	Wollaston Farm Wolverhampton	Merry Hill, Stourbridge Roseville, Parkfields	West Midlands Bus	
11/11A	Walsall	Tipton, Princes End, Ocker Hill, Wednesbury, Pleck	West Midlands Bus	
12	Birmingham	Oldbury, Langley Green, Bearwood	West Midlands Bus	
12A	Oldbury	Dixons Green, Oakham	Diamond Bus	was NX until 20/07/26 with route change
17/17A	Stourbridge	Milking Bank (17A), Gornalwood, Wall Heath, Kinswinford, Wordsley	Diamond Bus	
18	Merry Hill	Cinder Bank, Netherton, Old Hill, Cradley Heath, Quarry Bank	National Express West Midlands	was Diamond until 2/11/25
19	Q.E. Hospital	Dixons Green, Netherton, Old Hill, Halesowen, Quinton, Harborne	West Midlands Bus	was NX until 04/01/26
25	Kidderminster	Netherton, Merry Hill, Withymoor, Stourbridge	Diamond Bus	was Diamond until 26/09/26 with route change
27/27A	Wolverhampton	Milking Bank, Gornalwood, Sedgley, Goldthorn Park	Diamond Bus	
74	Birmingham	Dudley Port, Great Bridge, West Bromwich, Soho, Hockley	West Midlands Bus	
81 81	Wolverhampton	Coseley, Woodcross, Lanesfield, Parkfields	Banga Buses National Express West Midlands	NX eve & Sundays (was Diamond until 2/22/25)
82 82	Wolverhampton	Wrens Nest, Roseville, Coseley, Bilston, Moseley	West Midlands Bus Diamond Bus	Diamond eve & Sundays
87	Birmingham	Tividale, Oldbury, Smethwick, Cape Hill	West Midlands Bus	
126	Birmingham	Burnt Tree, Causeway Green, Bearwood	West Midlands Bus	
X8	Birmingham Wolverhampton	Dixons Green, Rowley Village, Blackheath, Quinton Roseville, Parkfields	West Midlands Bus	
215	Springfield	Kates Hill, Dixons Green, Warrens Hall	Diamond Bus	
223	Bilston	Milking Bank, Gornalwood, Sedgley, Cinder Hill, Woodcross	Diamond Bus	
226/226A	Merry Hill	Russells Hall, Bromley, Kingswinford, Wordsley, Brierley Hill	Diamond Bus	
229	Bilston	Tipton, Sedgley, Coseley	Diamond Bus	

== Former bus routes ==
Route	Destination	Operator	Notes
42	West Bromwich via Tipton	National Express West Midlands and Diamond	Was cut only as far as Tipton Queens Rd as of the January 2023 timetable change
208	Merry Hill	iGo Buses	Service was scrapped in 2019 after the administration of iGo buses and Diamond ceased the Sunday daytime service all together
121	West Bromwich	National Express West Midlands	Service withdrawn in 2018 and was replaced by 12A between Dudley & Oldbury
127	Birmingham	National Express West Midlands	Service withdrawn in 2018 and was replaced by 14 between Dudley & Blackheath
140	Birmingham	National Express West Midlands	Service withdrawn in 2018 and was replaced by the X8 to/from Wolverhampton
214	Foxyards Estate	Diamond Bus	Withdrawn due to low usage. Banga/NX service 81 diverted to partially replace this.
241	Halesowen	National Express West Midlands	Service withdrawn in 2018 and was replaced by the X8 between Dudley & Hurst Green and 14 between Hurst Green and Halesowen
124	Cradley Heath	Diamond Bus	Service withdrawn in 2019 and was replaced by 11/11A which was 81 at the time through Netherton and 24 through Saltwells
