= Herbert Homer =

English cricketer and administrator

Personal information
- Full name: Herbert Wesley Farmer Homer
- Born: 6 October 1895; Dudley, Worcestershire, England
- Died: 10 February 1977 (aged 81); Old Hill, Staffordshire, England
- Batting: Right-handed

Domestic team information
- Years: Team
- 1928–1931: Minor Counties
- 1922–1935: Staffordshire

Career statistics
Competition	First-class
Matches	4
Runs scored	185
Batting average	30.83
100s/50s	–/1
Top score	71
Balls bowled	–
Wickets	–
Bowling average	–
5 wickets in innings	–
10 wickets in match	–
Best bowling	–
Catches/stumpings	1/–
- Source: Cricinfo, 30 November 2011

Herbert Wesley Farmer Homer (6 October 1895 – 10 February 1977) was an English cricketer and cricket administrator. Homer was a right-handed batsman. He was born at Dudley, Worcestershire.

Homer made his debut for Staffordshire in the 1939 Minor Counties Championship against the Surrey Second XI. He played Minor counties cricket for Staffordshire from 1922 to 1935, making 85 appearances. In 1928, he made his first-class debut for a combined Minor Counties team against the touring West Indians at the County Ground, Exeter in 1928. He made three further first-class appearances for the Minor Counties, against Lancashire in 1929, Wales in 1930 and the touring New Zealanders in 1931. In these four first-class matches he scored a total of 185 runs at an average of 30.83, with a high score of 71. This score came against the New Zealanders.

Later in his life he became the President of the Birmingham and District Cricket League, holding the position in 1950 and again in 1959. He died at Old Hill, Staffordshire on 10 February 1977. His nephew Charles Palmer played Test cricket for England.
