= Dudley =

Town in West Midlands, England

Coordinates: 52°30′40″N 2°04′54″W

- Town
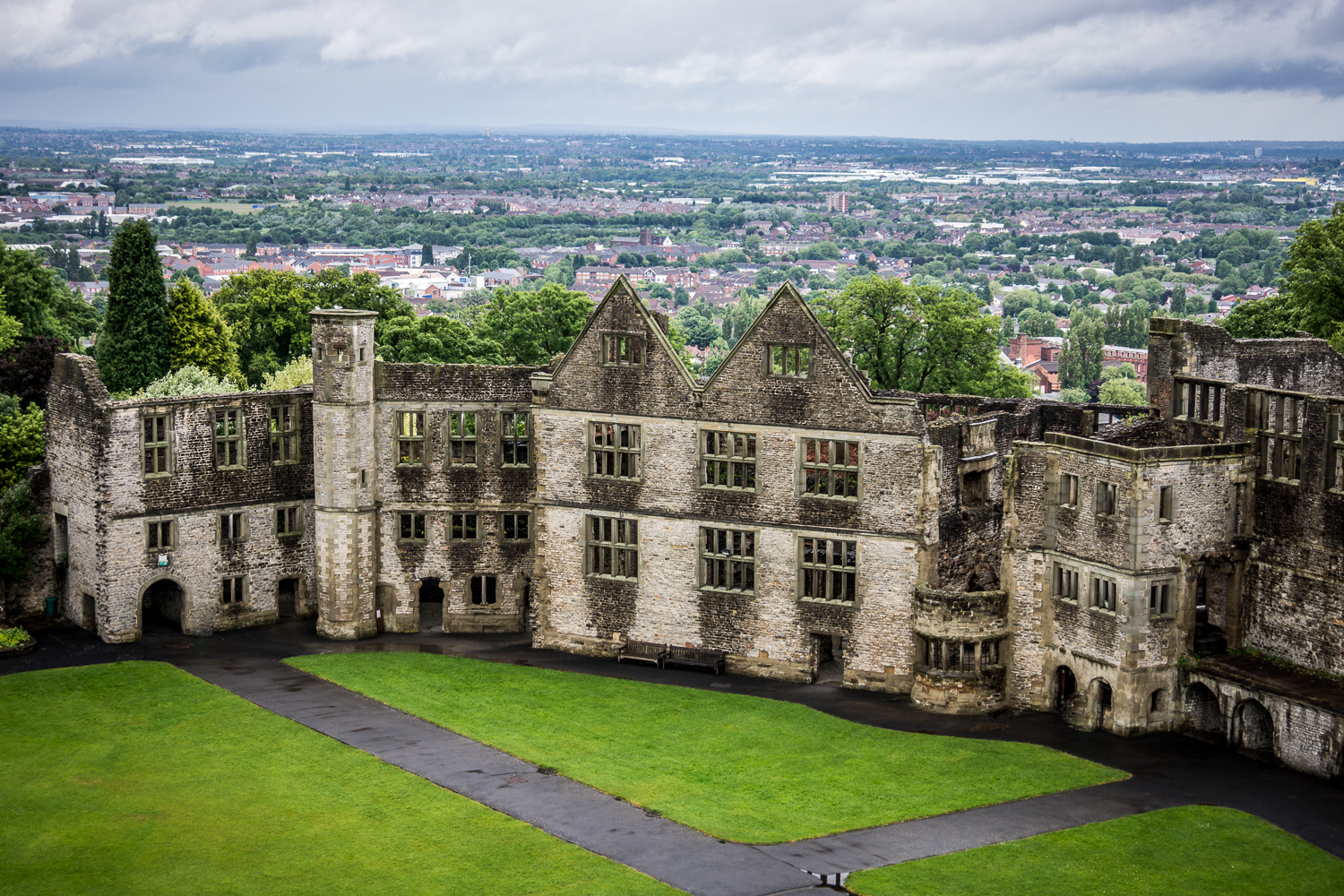
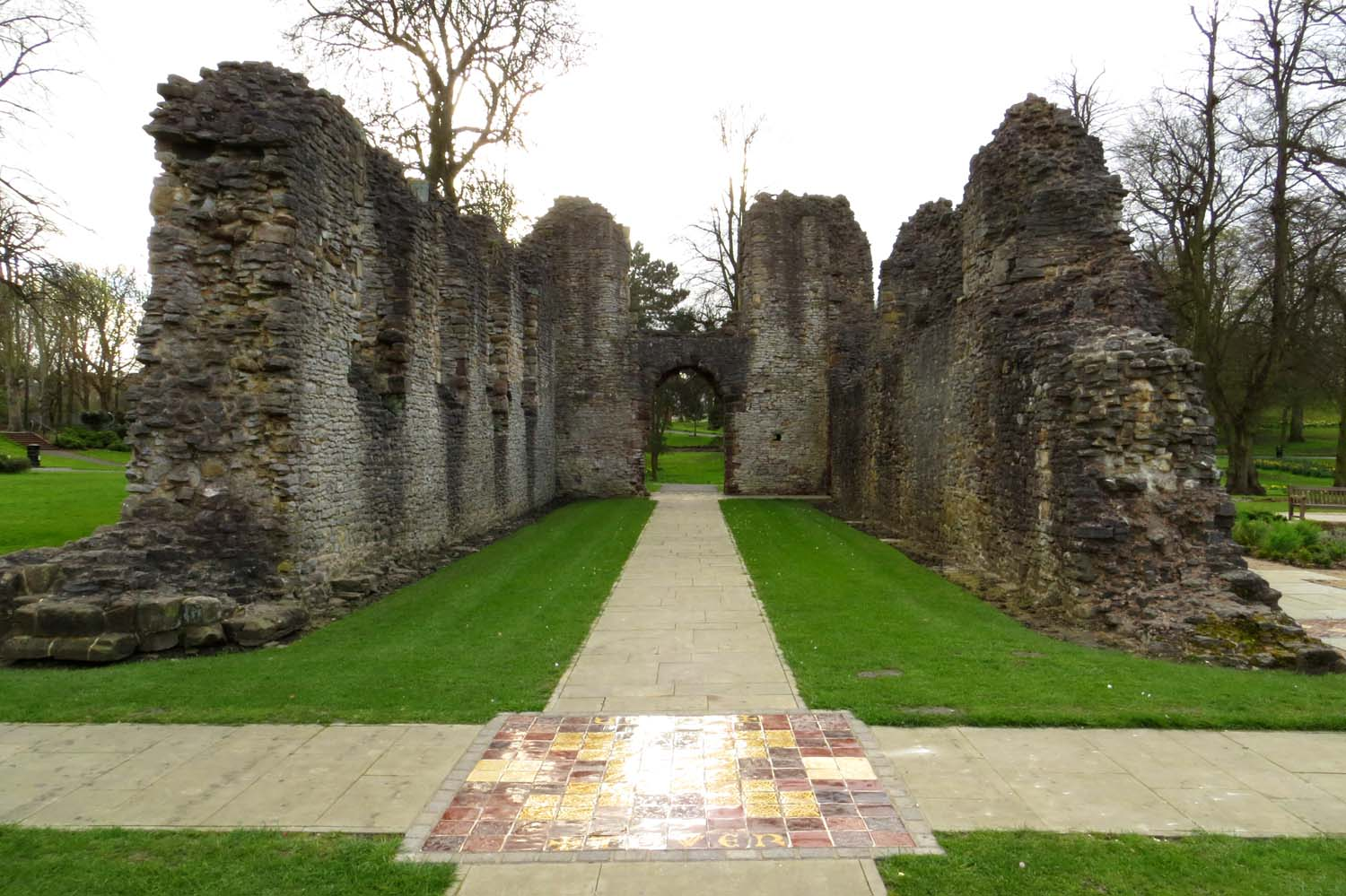
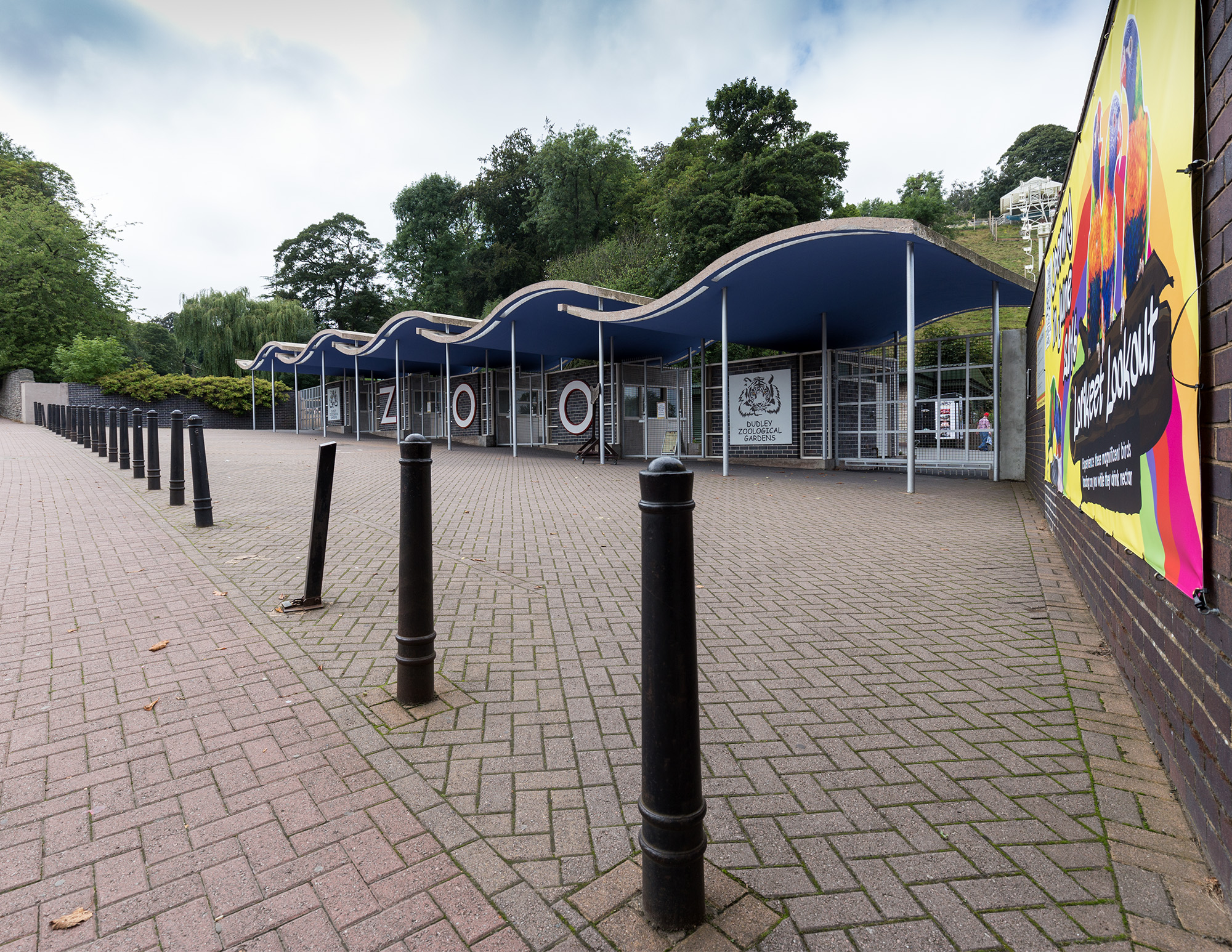
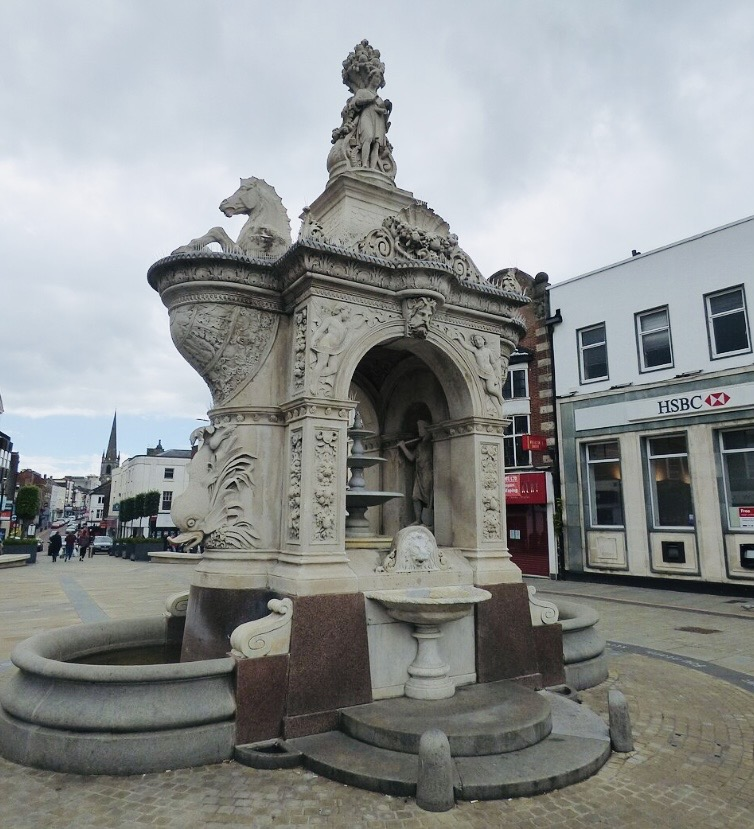
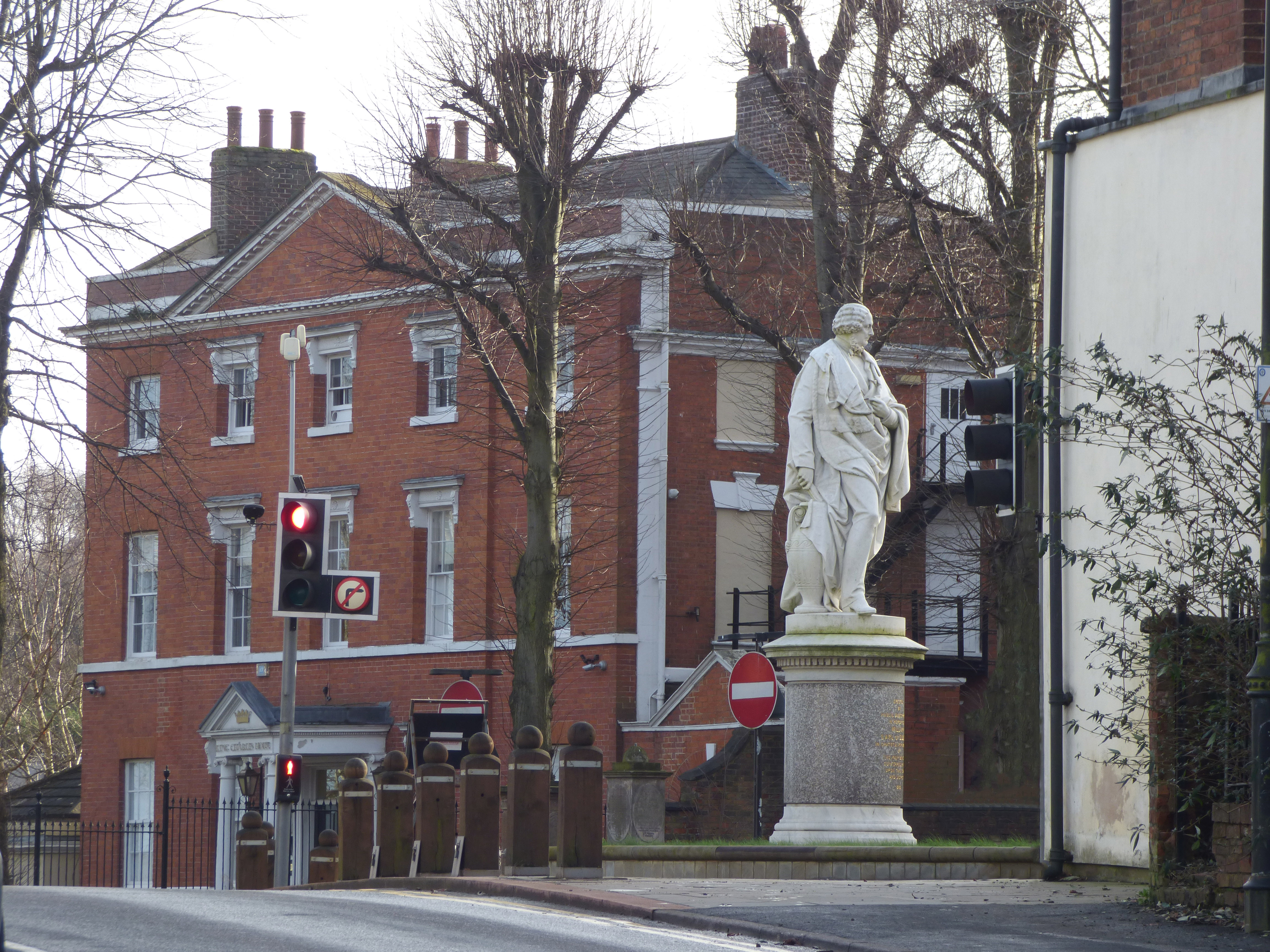
- Dudley Castle Dudley Priory Dudley Zoo Market Place 1st Earl of Dudley

- Location within the West Midlands
- Population: 79,379 (Built-Up Area); 312,900 (Metropolitan Borough) (Note: Both figures are taken from the 2011 census.)
- OS grid reference: SO9490
  - London: 108 mi (174 km)
- Metropolitan borough: Dudley
- Metropolitan county: West Midlands
- Region: West Midlands
- Country: England
- Sovereign state: United Kingdom
- Suburbs of the town: List: Eve Hill; Holly Hall; Kates Hill; Milking Bank; Mons Hill; Oakham; Old Park Farm; Priory Estate; Russells Hall Estate; Woodsetton; Woodside; Wren's Nest Estate
- Post town: DUDLEY
- Postcode district: DY1 – 3
- Dialling code: 01384; 0121; 01902
- Police: West Midlands
- Fire: West Midlands
- Ambulance: West Midlands
- UK Parliament: Dudley
- Website: www.dudley.gov.uk

Dudley (/ˈdʌdli/ DUD-lee, locally [ˈdʊdləi̯]) is a market town in the West Midlands, England, 6 miles (9.7 km) southeast of Wolverhampton and 8 miles (13 km) northwest of Birmingham. Historically part of Worcestershire, the town is the administrative centre of the Metropolitan Borough of Dudley. In the 2011 census, it had a population of 79,379. The wider Metropolitan Borough had a population of 312,900. In 2014, the borough council adopted a slogan describing Dudley as the capital of the Black Country, a title by which it had long been informally known.

Originally a market town, Dudley was one of the birthplaces of the Industrial Revolution and grew into an industrial centre in the 19th century with its iron, coal, and limestone industries before their decline and the relocation of its commercial centre to the nearby Merry Hill Shopping Centre in the 1980s. Tourist attractions include Dudley Zoo and Castle, the 12th-century priory ruins, and the Black Country Living Museum.

== History ==
=== Early history ===
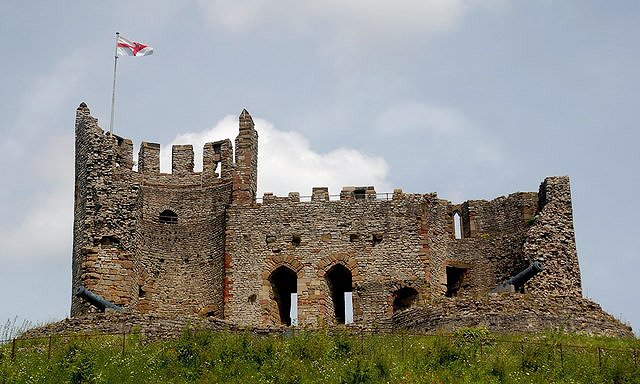
Dudley Castle

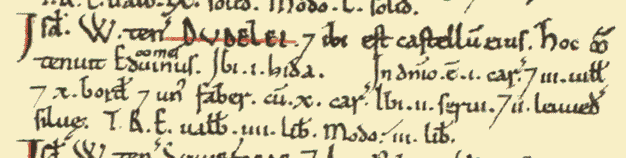
Dudley in the Domesday Book of 1086

Dudley has a history dating back to Anglo-Saxon times, its name deriving from the Old English Duddan Leah, meaning Dudda's clearing, and one of its churches being named in honour of the Anglo-Saxon king and saint, Edmund.

Mentioned in the Domesday Book of 1086 as Dudelei, in the hundred of Clent in Worcestershire, the town was listed as being a medium-sized manor in the possession of Earl Edwin of Mercia prior to the Norman Conquest, with William Fitz-Ansculf as Lord of the Manor in 1086. Dudley Castle, constructed in 1070 by William's father Ansculf de Picquigny after his acquisition of the town, served as the seat of the extensive Barony of Dudley, which possessed estates in eleven different counties across England.

Of historical significance, the town was attacked by King Stephen in 1138, after a failed siege of the castle following the baron's decision to support Empress Matilda's claim to the throne during The Anarchy.

The castle provided the centre from which the town and borough grew, with early coal and iron workings helping establish Dudley as a major market town during the Middle Ages, selling not only agricultural produce, but also iron goods at a national level. Working iron and mining for coal was in practice as early as the 13th century. The first mention of Dudley's status as a borough dates from the mid-13th century, when Roger de Somery, then Baron of Dudley, approved of the establishment of a market in nearby Wolverhampton. An inquisition after his death further established the value and importance of the borough, with mentions of the town's growing coal industry.

=== Early modern and Industrial Revolution ===
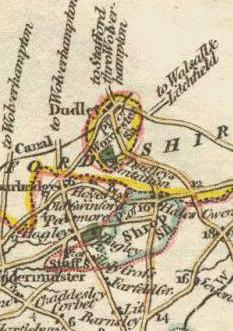
1814 map showing Dudley as an exclave of Worcestershire.

By the early 16th century the Dudley estate, now held by the Sutton family, had become severely in debt and was first mortgaged to distant relative John Dudley, Duke of Northumberland, before being sold outright in 1535. Following Dudley's execution in 1553, the estate returned to the Sutton family, during whose ownership the town was visited by Queen Elizabeth during a tour of England.

In 1605, conspirators of the Gunpowder Plot fled to Holbeche House in nearby Wall Heath, where they were defeated and captured by the forces of the Sheriff of Worcestershire.

During the English Civil War Dudley served as a Royalist stronghold, with the castle besieged twice by the Parliamentarians and later partly demolished on the orders of the Government after the Royalist surrender. It is also from around this time that the oldest excavated condoms, found in the remains of Dudley Castle, were believed to have originated.

Dudley had become an incredibly impoverished place during the 16th and 17th centuries, but the advent of the Industrial Revolution began to reverse this trend. In the early 17th century, Dud Dudley, an illegitimate son of Edward Sutton, 5th Baron Dudley and Elizabeth Tomlinson, devised a method of smelting Iron ore using coke at his father's works in Cradley and Pensnett Chase, though his trade was unsuccessful due to circumstances of the time. Abraham Darby was descended from Dud Dudley's sister, Jane, and was the first person to produce iron commercially using coke instead of charcoal at his works in Coalbrookdale, Shropshire in 1709. Abraham Darby was born near Wrens Nest Hill near the town of Dudley and it is claimed that he may have known about Dud Dudley's earlier work.

Dud Dudley's discovery, together with improvements to the local road network and the construction of the Dudley Canal, made Dudley into an important industrial and commercial centre. The first Newcomen steam engine, used to pump water from the mines of the Lord Dudley's estates, was installed at the Conygree coal works a mile east of Dudley Castle in 1712, though this is challenged by Wolverhampton, which also claims to have been the location of the first working Newcomen engine.

Dudley's population grew dramatically during the 18th and 19th centuries because of the increase in industry, with the main industries including coal and limestone mining. Other industries included iron, steel, engineering, metallurgy, glass cutting, textiles and leatherworking.

During this time living conditions remained very poor, with Dudley being named "the most unhealthy place in the country" in 1851. Health Inspector William Lee stated that "In no other part of England and Wales is the work of human extermination effected in so short a time as ... in Dudley". The report led to the installation of clean water supplies and sewage systems. Later the extensive development of council housing during the early 20th century relocated the occupants of local slum housing.

Following the Reform Act 1832, Dudley returned one Member of Parliament (MP), a privilege first enacted in the Parliament of 1295. The town was re-incorporated as a Municipal Borough in 1865, later becoming a County Borough in 1889.

=== Modern day ===
Dudley was developed substantially in the early 20th century, with the construction of many entertainment venues including a theatre and cinemas, with two indoor shopping centres being added later in the century. The grounds of Dudley Castle were converted into a zoo in 1937 by the Earl of Dudley, with buildings designed by architect Berthold Lubetkin. A reported 250,000 people attempted to visit the site upon the first day of opening.

In World War II, Dudley was bombed on several occasions. In September 1940 a Luftwaffe bomb demolished The Three Swans public house in the town centre and damaged several nearby buildings including St Thomas's Church and the new Co-Operative department store, but there were no fatalities. On 19 November 1940 a landmine was dropped in the Oakham area of the town and demolished a section of council houses in City Road, resulting in the deaths of 10 people and injuring many others. On 12 August 1941, four people were killed when another landmine was dropped in nearby Birch Crescent. These were the only fatal air raids on Dudley.

Dudley thrived in the post-war economic boom in the Midlands, with growing industries and affluence. To meet the labour shortage, the town became home to communities from the British Commonwealth, including the Caribbean and South Asia. Most famously, this included the parents of Lenny Henry who moved to Dudley in the late 1950s. As elsewhere, these communities faced hardships such as workplace racism, poor housing and physical violence - the worst example of this were the large-scale riots of 1962.

Following local government reforms in 1966, Dudley was expanded to include the majority of the former urban districts of Brierley Hill and Sedgley, along with parts of Coseley, Amblecote and Rowley Regis; an area in the eastern section of the town was also transferred into the new borough of Warley. Most of this land had been held by the Lords of Dudley, and contained within the Dudley registration district and parliamentary borough. In 1974, further reorganization led to the creation of the present-day metropolitan borough, which included the nearby towns of Stourbridge and Halesowen.

Dudley was struck by an F1/T2 tornado on 23 November 1981, as part of the record-breaking nationwide tornado outbreak on that day. The tornado touched down in Woodsetton, subsequently passing through Dudley town centre, causing moderate damage, before dissipating.

Industrial decline has seen the loss of many long-established businesses in the town. The development of the Merry Hill Shopping Centre between 1985 and 1990 also saw the loss of most of the town centre's leading name stores, which relocated to take advantage of the tax incentives offered by Merry Hill's status as an Enterprise Zone. The 2008 financial crisis and the Great Recession resulted in even more of the retail units in the town centre becoming vacant, with the Woolworths store on Market Place closing in December 2008 when the company went bankrupt, and Beatties closing its store – the last department store in the town – in January 2010, after more than 40 years due to falling trade.

== Governance ==
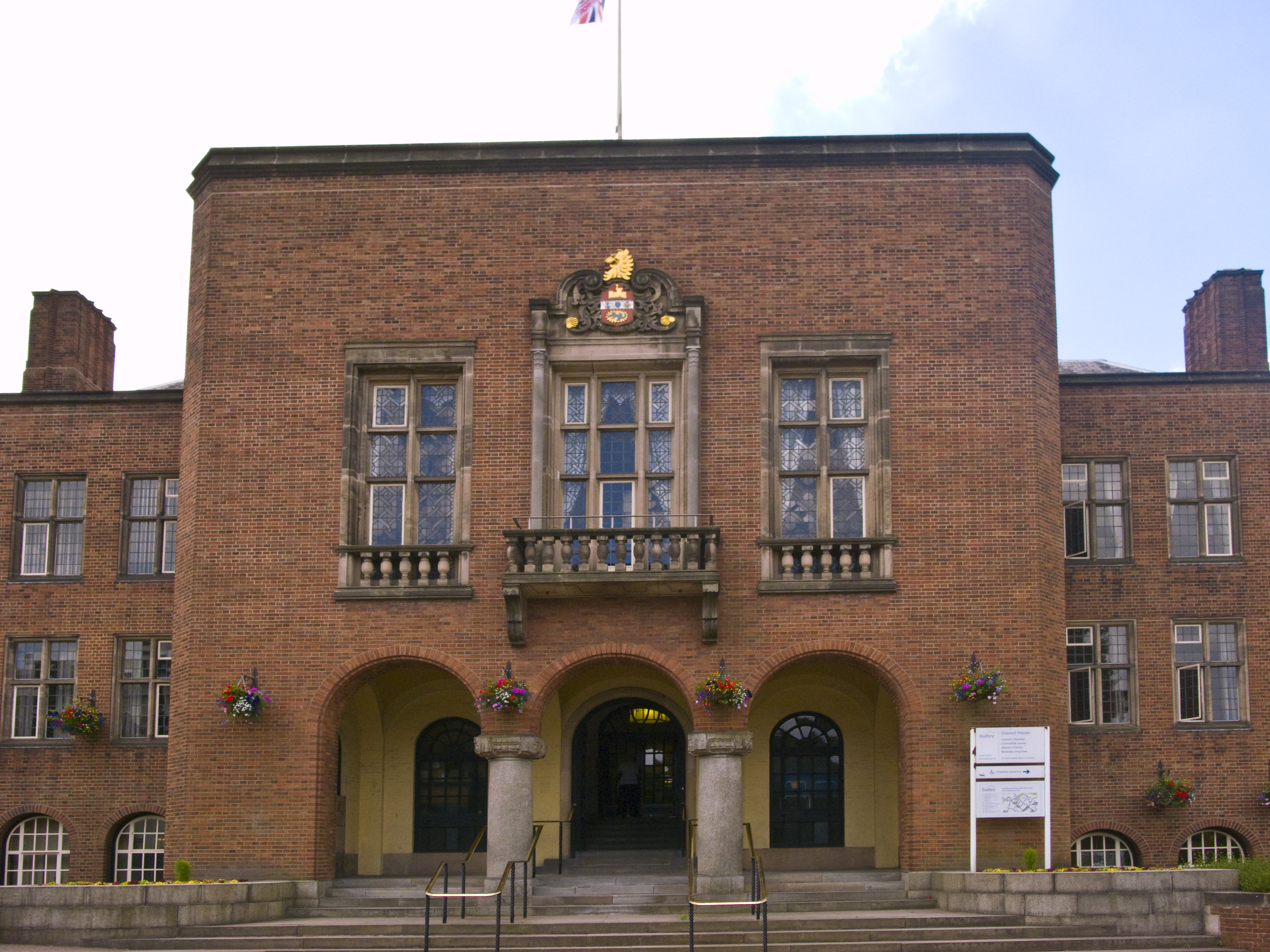
Dudley Council House, seat of Dudley Metropolitan Borough Council

=== Local government ===
Dudley Improvement Act 1791
- Act of Parliament
- Parliament of Great Britain
- Long title: An Act for better paving, cleansing, lighting, watching, and otherwise improving the Town of Dudley, in the County of Worcester, and for better supplying the said Town with Water.
- Citation: 31 Geo. 3. c. 79
- Territorial extent: Great Britain

Dates
- Royal assent: 6 June 1791
- Commencement: 10 August 1790 (Note: Start of session.)
- Repealed: 22 October 1969
Other legislation
Repealed by	Dudley Corporation Act 1969

Status: Repealed

Text of statute as originally enacted

The town had been a manorial borough from the end of the 13th century, and from at least the 16th century until the passing of the Dudley Town Act 1791 (31 Geo. 3. c. 79), was governed by the Court Leet of the Lords of Dudley. From 1791, the Town Commissioners were the main local authority although the Court Leet continued to meet until 1866. In 1836 the Dudley Poor Law Union was formed, consisting of Dudley itself, and the parishes of Sedgley, Tipton, and Rowley Regis. In 1853 the Town Commissioners were superseded by the Board of Health, before the town was eventually incorporated into a municipal borough in 1865. It became a county borough in 1888 under the Local Government Act.

For many years the town (but not the castle, which was outside the boundary in Staffordshire) formed part of an exclave of the county of Worcestershire. Despite the more recent changes in county boundaries, the town and borough still remain part of the Anglican Diocese of Worcester.

Dudley Council House in Priory Road was financed by the then Earl of Dudley, and was officially opened by Duke of Kent in December 1935. Dudley Town Hall (an events venue) opened on St James's Road in 1928; it stands next to council offices which were converted from the old Police Station in 1939, after the construction of a new building on nearby New Street.

Dudley is the administrative centre of the Dudley Metropolitan Borough, governed by Dudley Metropolitan Borough Council. The borough, which also includes the towns of Halesowen and Stourbridge, had a population of just over 312,900 as of the 2011 census. In 2012 the Dudley Metropolitan Borough made an unsuccessful bid to receive city status, losing out to Chelmsford, Perth, and St. Asaph.

=== National government ===
Dudley presently has two parliamentary constituencies, Dudley North and Dudley South, which cover the town and its surrounding area. In October 2017, proposals to revise constituency boundaries were published that would reduce Dudley to just one constituency. The town itself would be divided between multiple constituencies, including ones predominantly based in neighbouring council areas such as Wolverhampton and Sandwell. The proposals were criticised by then MP for Dudley North, Ian Austin As of the 2019 general election, the current Members of Parliament (MPs) elected from these seats to the House of Commons are Marco Longhi and Mike Wood, both Conservatives.

== Landmarks ==
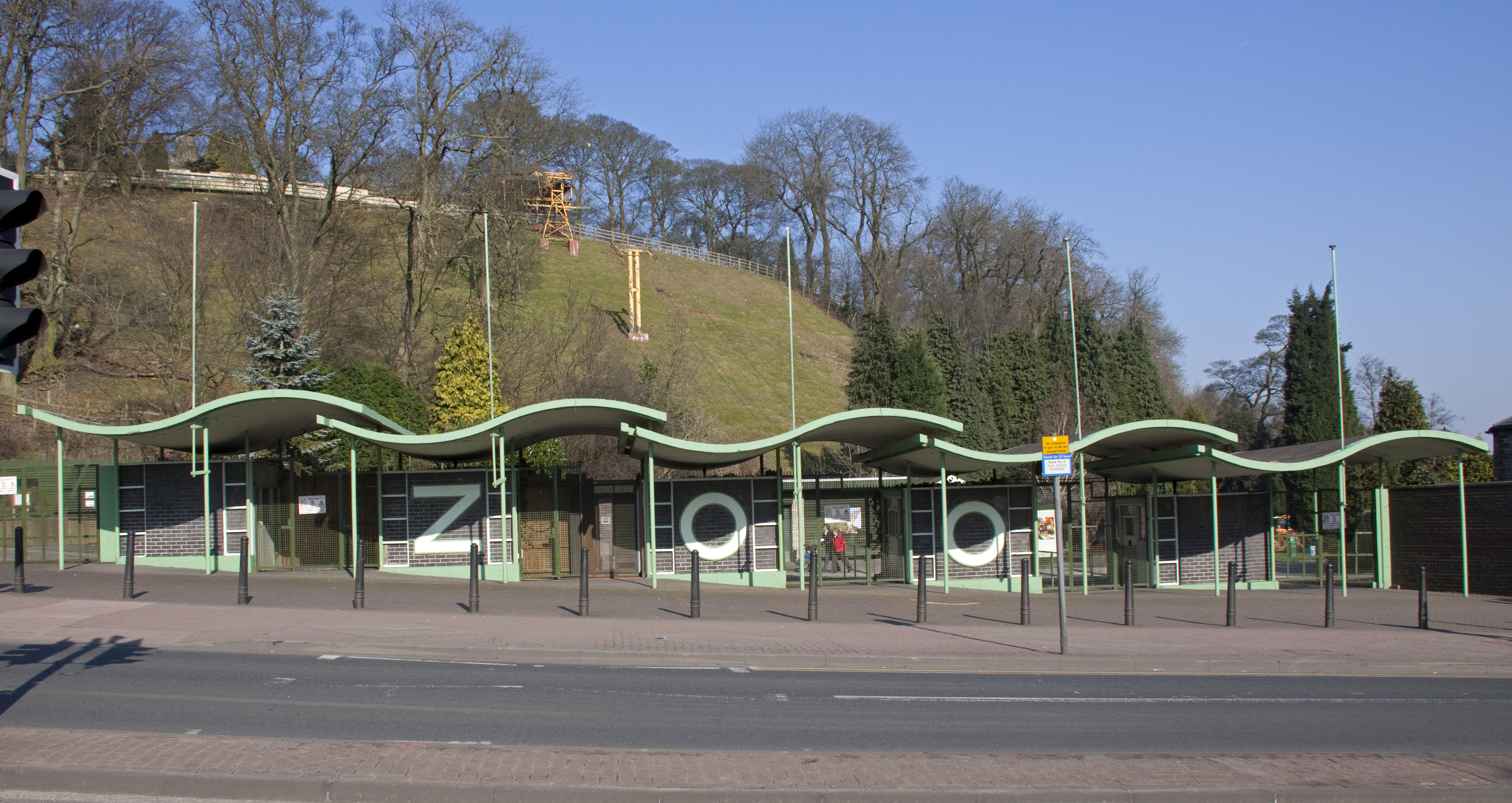
Dudley Zoo

The 13th-century ruins of Dudley Castle overlook the town; it is a Grade I listed structure. Dudley Zoo is built into the castle grounds, and houses a large collection of endangered species, and also the largest collection of Tecton buildings in the world. Under proposals by Dudley Zoo, in partnership with Dudley Council, St. Modwen, and Advantage West Midlands, the zoo is to be regenerated, which will see a former freightliner site redeveloped with a tropical dome, Asiatic forest, two aquatic facilities and walkthrough aviaries. It was expected to cost £38.7 million in 2007.

There are many canals in and around Dudley, the main one being the Dudley Canal – most of which passes beneath the town in the Dudley Tunnel and is accessible only by boat because there is no towpath. The open sections of canal are popular with walkers, cyclists, fishermen, and narrowboat users. National Cycle Network route 54 passes through the town.

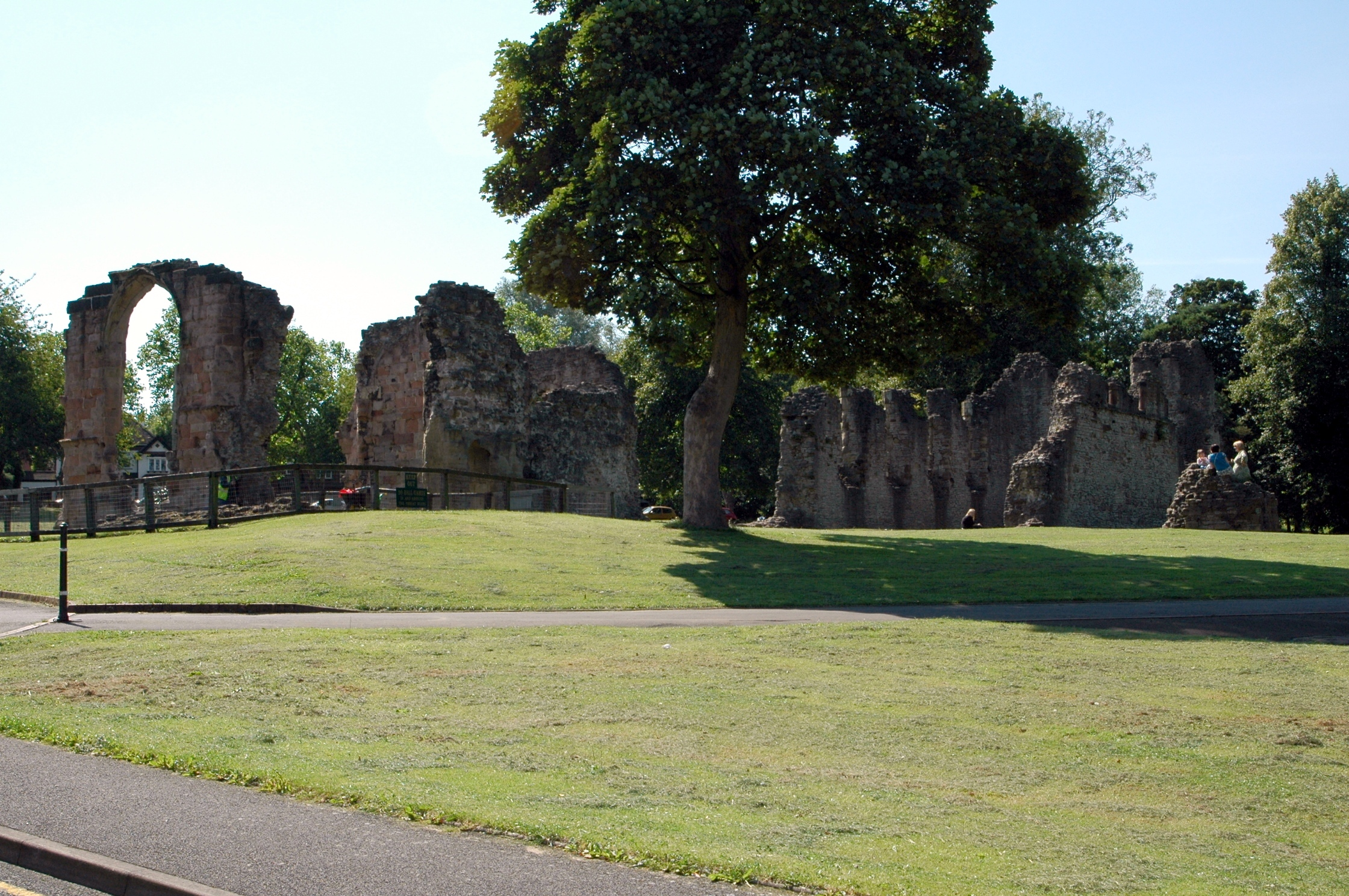
The ruins of Dudley Priory

There are 11 scheduled ancient monuments in Dudley and the surrounding district, and 260 listed buildings, including 6 Grade I listed and 19 Grade II* listed buildings.

== Culture ==
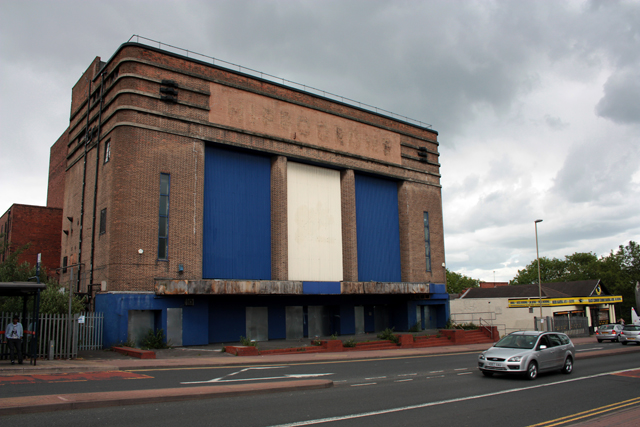
The former Hippodrome theatre

=== Entertainment ===
A multiplex Showcase Cinema and Tenpin bowling alley are part of the Castlegate leisure complex. Dudley Town Hall hosts dances, theatrical performances and concerts.

The town was formerly home to a number of cinemas and theatres, including the Criterion, Gaumont, Odeon, and Plaza. The Dudley Hippodrome was one of the largest theatres in the West Midlands, built along with the adjacent Plaza Cinema just prior to the Second World War in 1938. The 1,600-seat Art Deco venue was constructed to replace the earlier Opera House, which had burned down in 1936. After its closure in 1964, the building was in use as a bingo hall until 2009, when it was purchased by Dudley Council with a view for demolition. After long public opposition the building was leased to campaigners in December 2016, with the intent to restore it to theatre use; however the lease was revoked by the council in February 2018, citing a lack of progress. It was demolished in 2023 despite a campaign to save it. The Plaza Cinema remained open until October 1990 and the building was demolished in 1997.

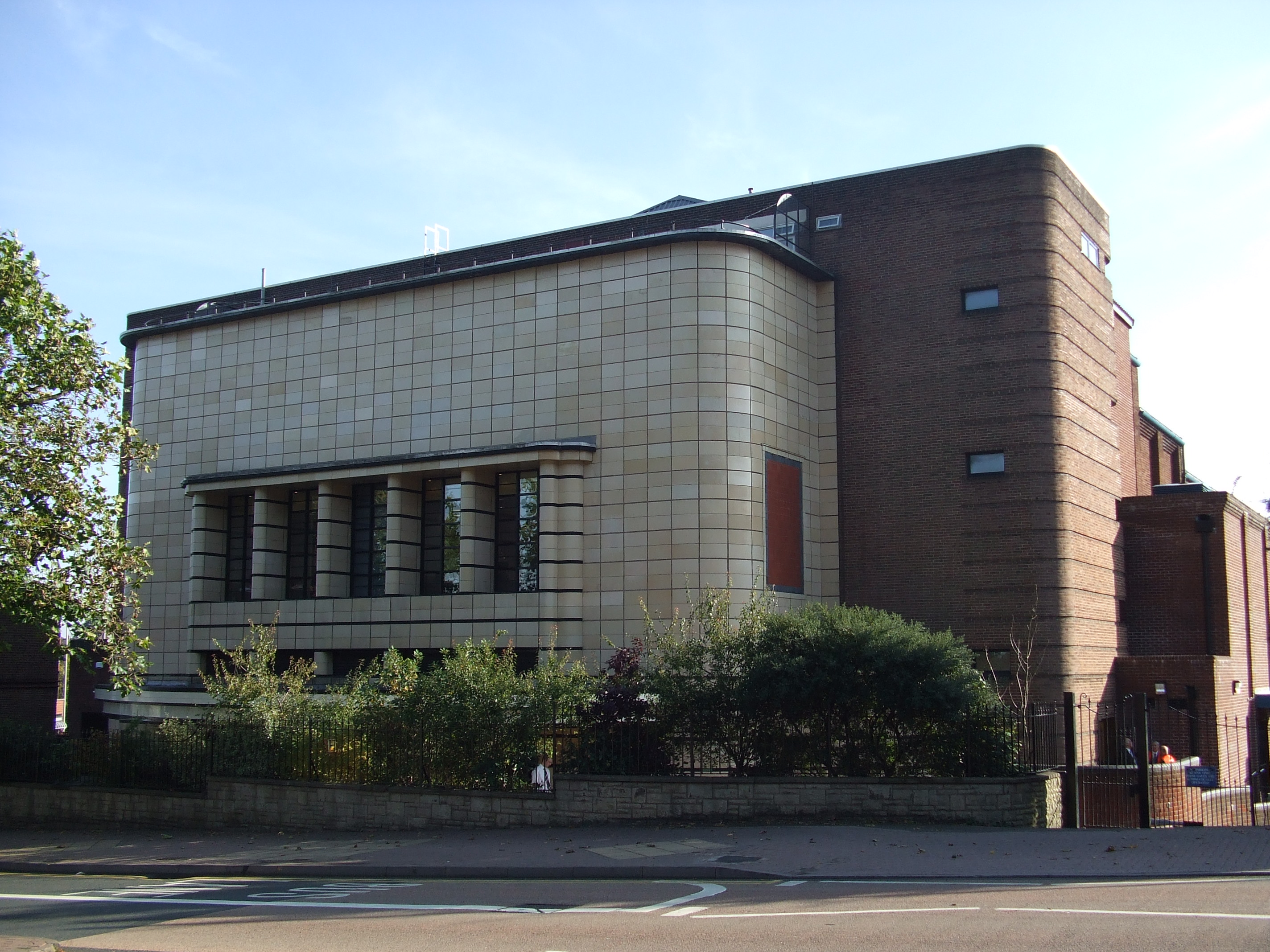
Former Odeon cinema

An Odeon cinema opened on Castle Hill in 1937, but has been used as a Kingdom Hall for Jehovah's Witnesses since 1976. The building is Grade II listed for being "an almost complete example of [a] typical Odeon cinema of the 1930's, with no subdivision of the auditorium or alteration of its floor levels".

Until 2011, the JB's nightclub was situated on Castle Hill, after relocating from an earlier site in King Street (behind Pathfinders clothes store) in the 1990s. The club hosted early performances by acts such as U2, Dire Straits, and Judas Priest. It closed after going into administration and has since reopened to host wedding receptions and conferences.

=== Museums and galleries ===
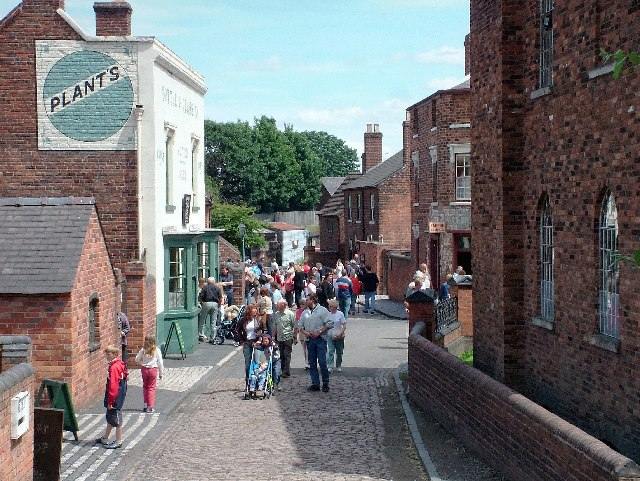
Black Country Living Museum

The museums in Dudley celebrate the geological and industrial heritage of the town and the surrounding Black Country region, and its role in the Industrial Revolution. The Black Country Living Museum is an open-air living museum, which consists of reconstructed buildings from the surrounding area forming a living replica of an industrial village, with demonstrators portraying life in the region from that time. Work began in 2022 to recreate a typical Black Country town centre using original buildings such as the Woodside Library and replicas of other lost buildings such as the Elephant & Castle pub which stood at the junction of Stafford Street and Cannock Road in Wolverhampton. The pub, whose lower section is clad in traditional Victorian glazed tiles, opened within the museum's village in Autumn 2022.

The Dudley Museum and Art Gallery opened in the town centre in 1912. It was closed by Dudley Council in 2016 as part of cost-cutting measures, despite a public petition against closure. Exhibits are on display at a modern building on Tipton Road known as Dudley Museum at the Archives.

== Transport ==
=== Rail ===
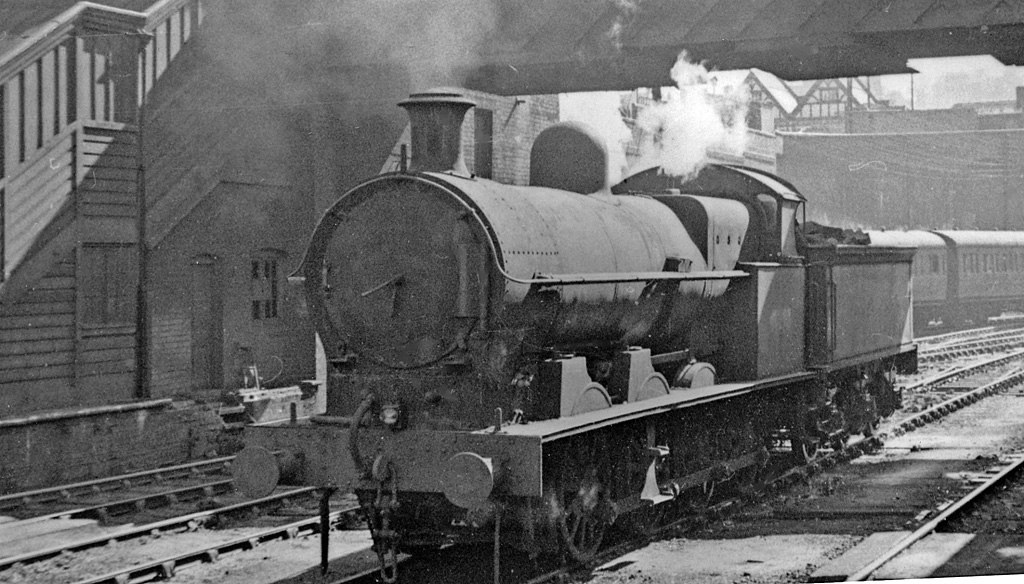
View southward, towards Dudley Tunnel and Stourbridge Junction in 1951.

According to ONS, there are two railway stations in Dudley, both just over a mile from Dudley town centre, these are Dudley Port and Tipton. They are within the town of Dudley but outside the borough boundary as parts of Sandwell are considered within Dudley Town. The nearest station to the town within the Dudley borough is Coseley. All of these stations are on the same line, served by local services operated by West Midlands Trains. The nearest regular intercity services run from the Sandwell & Dudley in Oldbury, which was rebuilt in 1984 to serve the two boroughs.

Dudley railway station located in the town centre was closed under the Beeching cuts in 1964. It opened in 1860 on the junction between the South Staffordshire and the Oxford, Worcester and Wolverhampton lines, and in its heyday was a hub of services east to Birmingham (via a junction at Great Bridge), Walsall and Lichfield; north to Wolverhampton, Tipton and Coseley; and south-west to Stourbridge, as well as a line that served the small communities on the way to Old Hill and Halesowen. The site was later used as a Freightliner terminal by Freightliner, until an unpopular closure on 26 September 1989.

A proposal to re-open the segment of line between Dudley and Dudley Port was unveiled in December 2014, to allow for a light rail link from the town centre to the main line, but this plan was scrapped in May 2016 as Dudley Council favoured keeping the line available for the now confirmed West Midlands Metro extension to Brierley Hill, then later Stourbridge.

=== Tram ===
Dudley was the terminus point of two tram routes which opened in the later part of the 19th century. The first route, linking the town with Tipton and Wednesbury, opened on 21 January 1884 operating steam trams, the route being electrified in 1907 before being closed in March 1930 and replaced by Midland Red buses along the route. The second route opened a year later, linking the town with Birmingham and heading through the centre of nearby Tividale village on the Dudley-Tipton border. This line was electrified in 1904 and remained open until 30 September 1939, when it too was replaced by Midland Red buses.

In 2021, a 11 km (6.8 mi) long line bringing 2 new lines of the West Midlands Metro, running from Wednesbury to Brierley Hill via Dudley, began construction to re-instate a tram service along the South Staffordshire Line, before running through the town centre and towards Merry Hill. Phase one is expected to begin operation in 2025, connecting Dudley to Edgbaston Village in Birmingham City Centre, and to Wolverhampton station

=== Bus ===
It was announced that Dudley bus station would close to the public in January 2024. A new bus and tram interchange is scheduled to open in Spring 2026.

== Geography ==
=== Geology ===
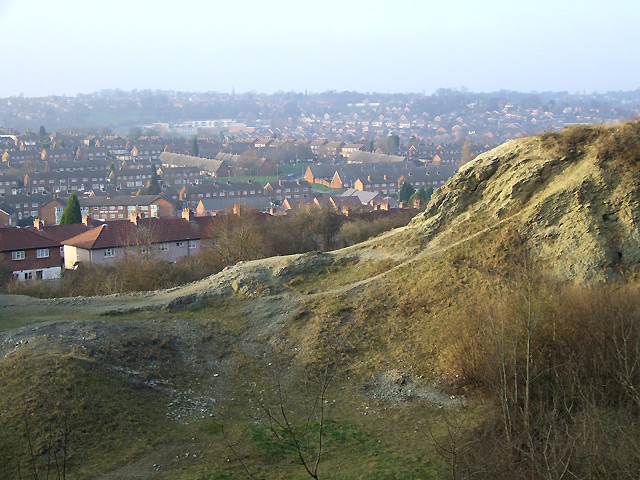
Wren's Nest

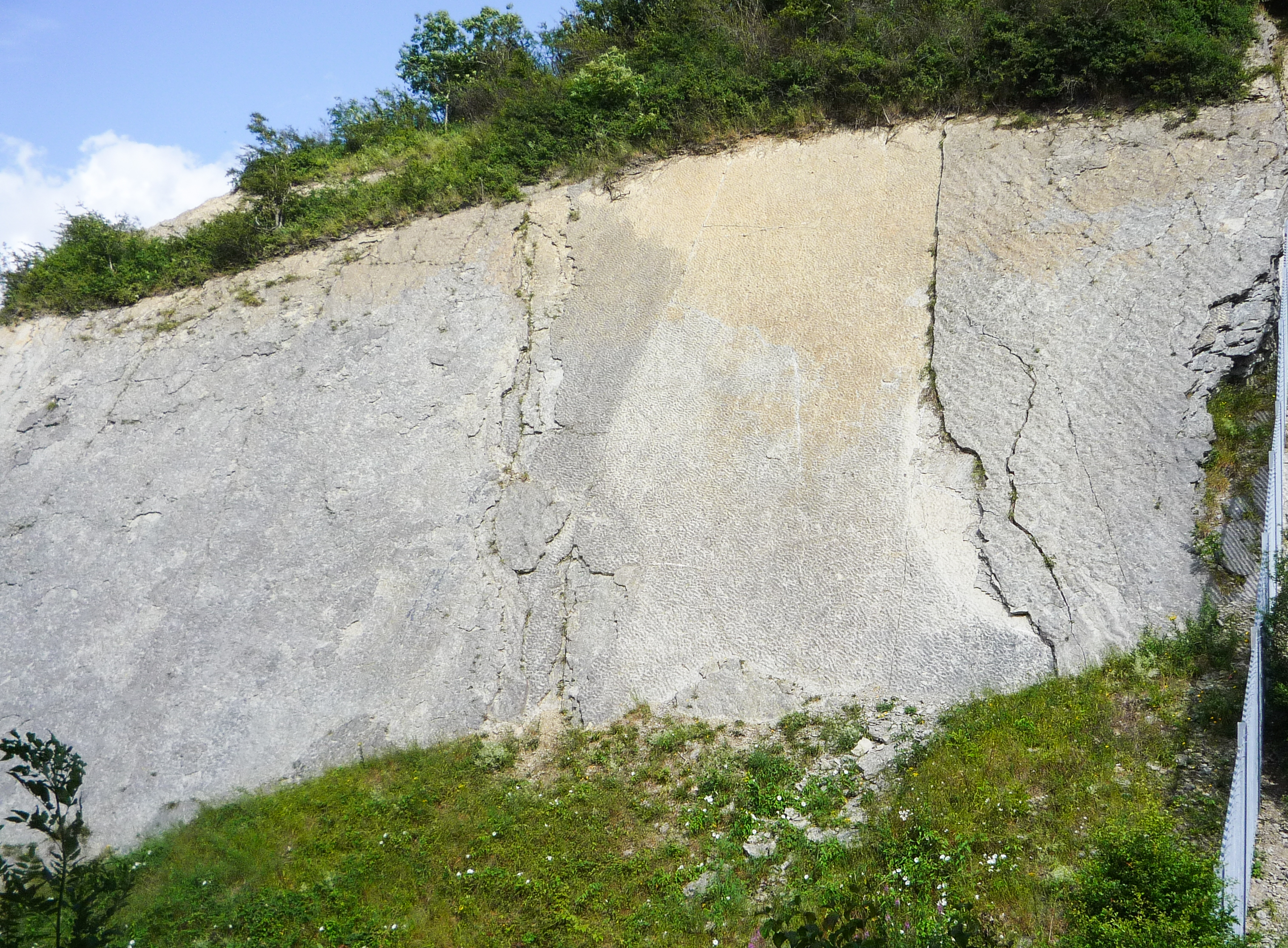
Ripple beds in the Wren's Nest National Nature Reserve

Dudley covers an area of the South Staffordshire Coalfield, which contributed heavily to its growth and industrialisation during the 18th century Industrial Revolution.

North-west of the town centre lies the Wren's Nest Nature Reserve, the first British nature reserve in an urban area and a site of special scientific interest (SSSI), considered to be one of the most notable geological locations in the British Isles. A part of the Much Wenlock Limestone Formation, it was heavily mined for centuries because of its large limestone deposits, and is also the location of one of the largest fossil sites in England. The town lends its name to the "Dudley locust", (also 'Dudley Bug'), a trilobite with the scientific name Calymene blumenbachii that was found in these limestone pits in 1749 by Charles Lyttleton.

In the 1830s, Scottish geologist Sir Roderick Murchison visited the Wren's Nest to collect fossils as part of his research. 65% of his palaeontological evidence featured in the 1839 publication "The Silurian System" was from Dudley.

== Demography ==
Dudley Compared
2011 UK Census	Dudley (Built-up area subdivision)	Dudley (Borough)	West Midlands region	England
Total population	79,379	312,925	5,601,847	53,012,456
White British	78.4%	88.5%	79.2%	79.8%
Asian	12.3%	6.0%	10.8%	7.7%
Black	3.6%	1.4%	3.2%	3.4%
Mixed	3.2%	1.8%	2.8%	2.2%
Other	2.5%	2.1%	4.5%	6.7%
Source: Office for National Statistics

The current figure for the population of Dudley is 79,379. This figure differs considerably from that given at the 2001 census (194,919), which led to it being considered one of the largest towns in Britain without city status. However, this change is not due to large population movements but to a redefinition of the town's boundaries (for example, Kingswinford with a population of over 50,000, included as Dudley in the 2001 census, is now considered a separate town). In addition, the 2001 Urban Subdivision included Brierley Hill, which the local authority considers a separate town.

== Education ==
=== Secondary education ===
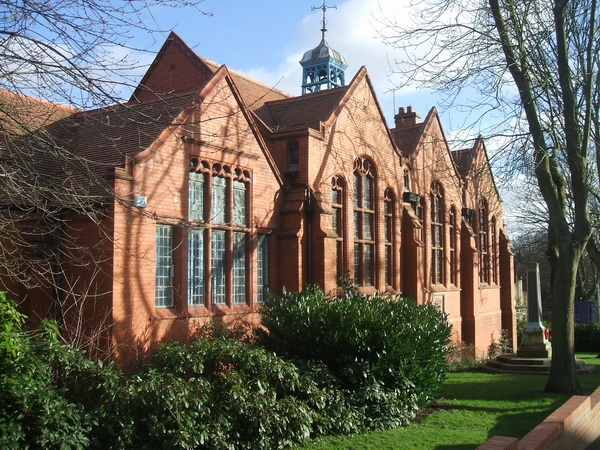
St James Academy, Dudley

There are several secondary schools in and around Dudley. The Dudley Academies Trust, created in association with Dudley College, runs four of these: Beacon Hill Academy in Sedgley, The Link Academy in Netherton, Pegasus Academy in Holly Hall, and St James Academy near the town centre.

Bishop Milner Catholic College is a Roman Catholic secondary school in the town. Opened in 1960, it became one of the first Roman Catholic secondary schools in the region and is the oldest existing secondary school – by name – in Dudley.

=== Special schools ===
There are several special schools within Dudley, to cater for students with special educational needs. The Old Park School serves pupils from the age of 3 to 19, and was originally located in the Russells Hall Estate, but relocated to new premises in Quarry Bank in 2011. The Rosewood School also caters for children within the age range. It was built on the Russells Hall Estate during the 1960s, but relocated to the former Highfields Primary School site in Coseley in March 2008.

The Woodsetton School near Sedgley caters to pupils from ages 4–11.

Sutton School, built in 1962 in Russells Hall, caters only for pupils from 11 to 16.

=== Further and Higher Education ===
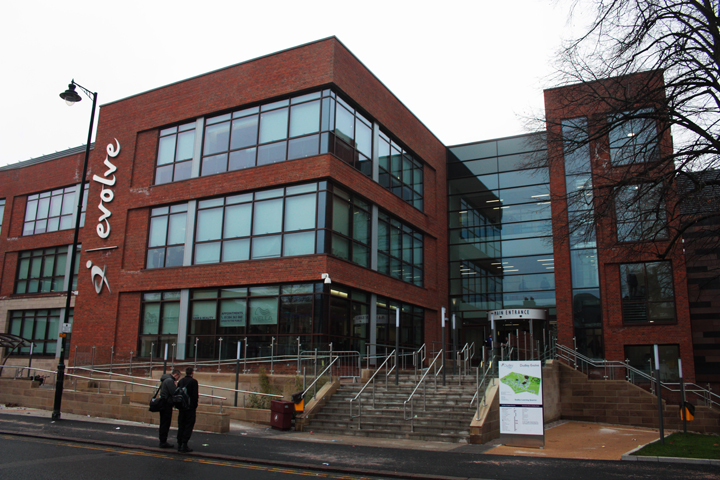
Evolve Campus of Dudley College

Originally established as a Mechanics' Institute in 1862, Dudley College of Technology provides further education for the town. Plans to establish a 'learning quarter' saw several new campuses built in the town centre in 2012, replacing previous sites elsewhere in the borough.

Dudley Training College for Teachers was opened in 1909 on a site on Eve Hill. In 1965 it was renamed Dudley College of Education, a period when it trained over 600 students a year. It was taken over by Wolverhampton Polytechnic in 1977, which then became the University of Wolverhampton. The campus was closed in 2002 and the main college building was demolished, leaving the town and borough without higher education provision. A new Institute of Technology, offering higher education courses, was due to open in 2021 in the Castle Hill area.

== Public services ==
=== Libraries ===
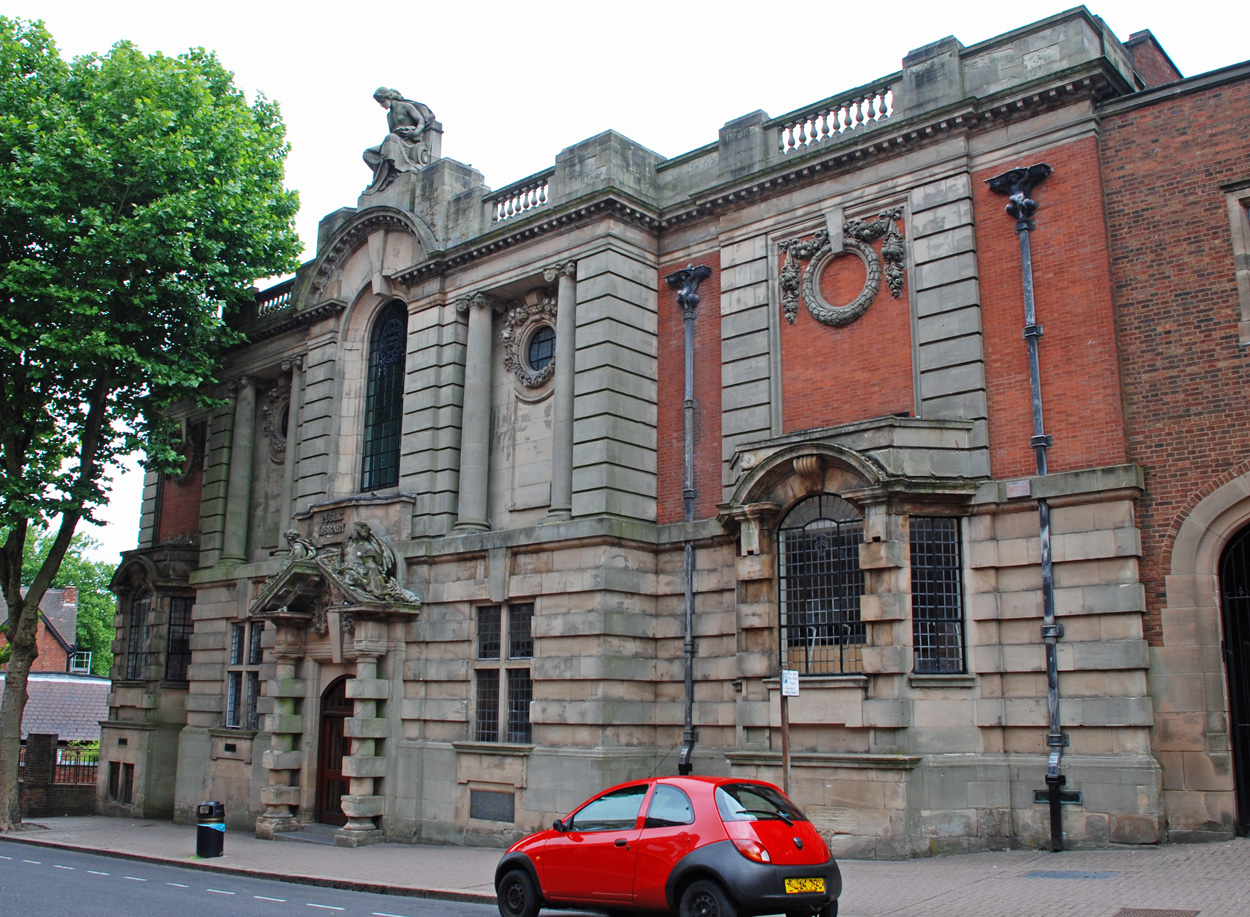
Dudley Library

Dudley Library is situated on St. James's Road, in the town centre. The present building, a Grade II listed Edwardian baroque, was designed by George H. Wenyon, and opened in 1909 to replace the older site in Priory Street. The statuary above the main entrance depicts "philosophy, science and the arts" and was put in place by H.H. Martyn & Co. The town has had a public library since 1878. The library underwent a major expansion in 1966, and significant refurbishment in 2002 and 2012.

The library service also operates eight branch libraries and four self-service 'Library Links', along with four other main libraries situated throughout Dudley Borough, including Netherton Library, which moved buildings to the Savoy centre in 2012. A controversial re-structuring and modernisation of the service between 2006 and 2009 lead to the closure of several smaller borough libraries in favour of the 'Library Links'.

=== Medical ===
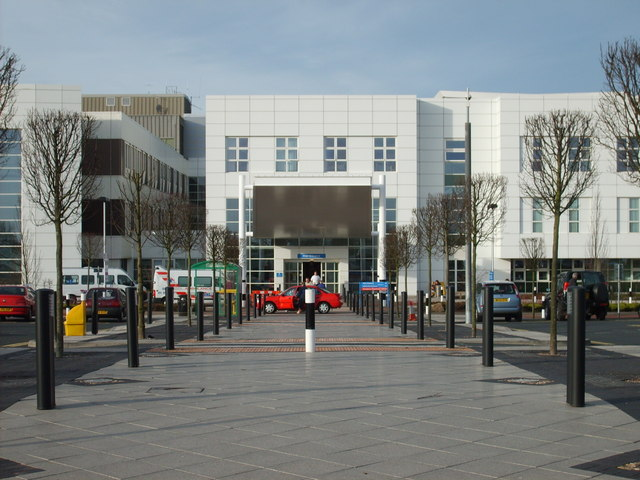
Russells Hall Hospital

Dudley is served by several National Health Service facilities. The main general hospital is Russells Hall, located to the south of the town. It was constructed in 1976, though financial difficulties prevented it from opening until 1983. A major expansion of the hospital was completed in 2005 when it incorporated all inpatient services from the other hospitals in the borough.

The Guest Hospital was initially created as a charity hospital by the Earl of Dudley in 1849 to accommodate blinded miners. It was taken over by local chainmaker Joseph Guest in 1871, and converted for general hospital use. It remained in use throughout the twentieth century, but was downgraded to an outpatient-only centre in the 2000s following the construction of a new block; the original hospital site was re-developed for private housing in 2018.

Bushey Fields Hospital provides psychiatric care for the area. It was developed adjacent to Russells Hall Hospital in the 1980s and early 1990s to replace facilities at Burton Road Hospital. Approximately one mile west of the town centre, Burton Road Hospital was built in the mid-19th century, initially as a workhouse, before becoming a hospital in 1859. It closed in December 1993, and was demolished the following year for re-development.

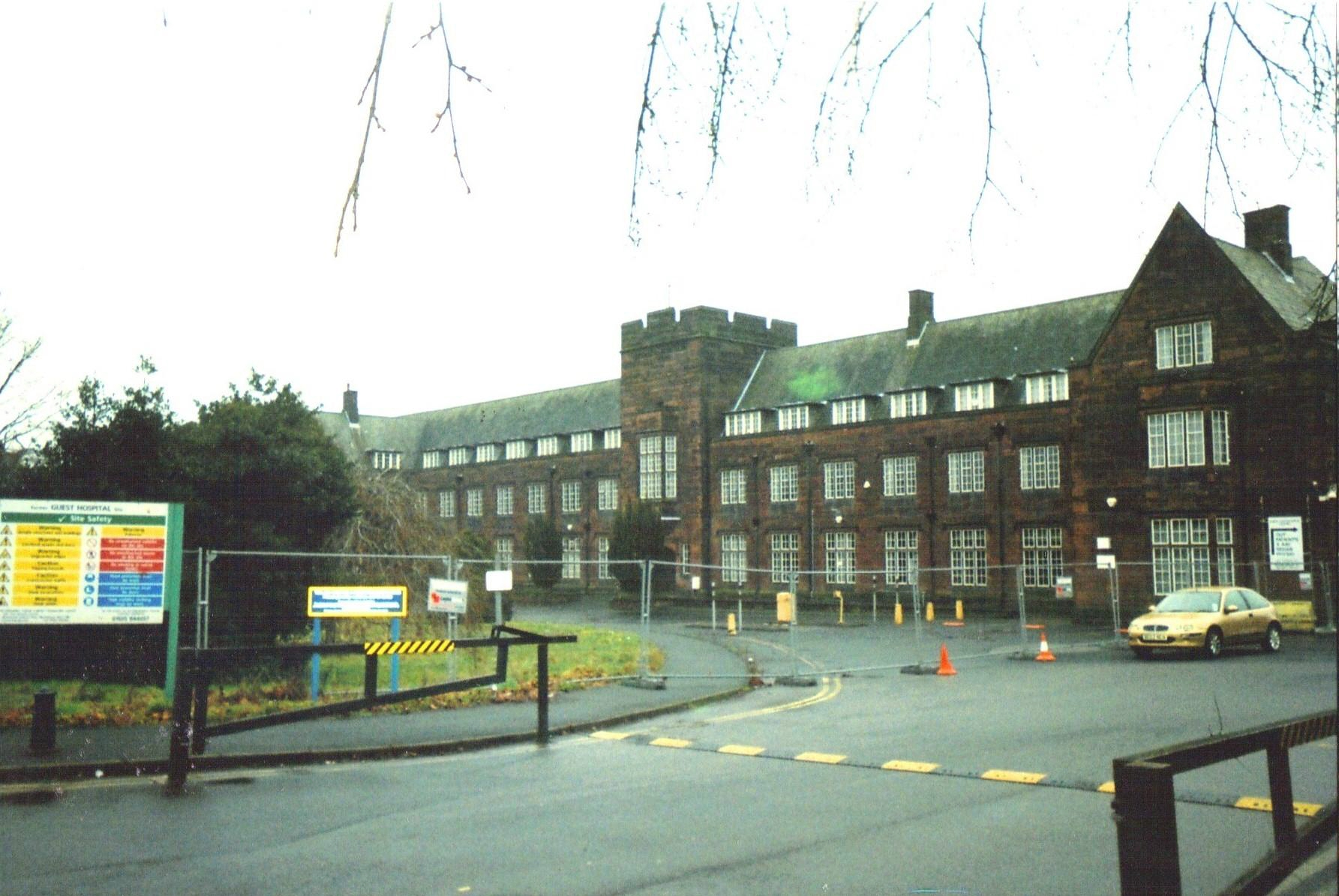
The Guest Hospital's Victorian wing, pictured in 2011

=== Emergency services ===
Law enforcement in Dudley is carried out by West Midlands Police, with the borough's sole police station located in Brierley Hill. Closure of Dudley Police Station was announced in 2017 as part of cost-cutting measures, though a small number of officers are set to remain in the town centre from a shared base with the local council.

In 2019 plans were put forward to build a new police station in the town centre, although disputes between Dudley Council and West Midlands Police have delayed the project.

Fire and rescue services are provided by the West Midlands Fire Service, with the fire station situated on Burton Road on land previously occupied by Burton Road Hospital. The former fire station site on Tower Street now forms part of a campus of Dudley College.

== Religion ==
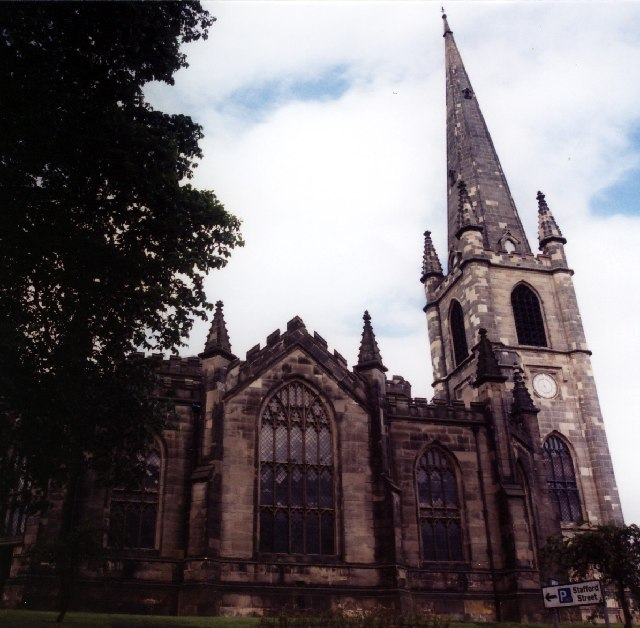
St. Thomas' Church

The oldest church in the town is St. Edmund's, dating back to Anglo-Saxon times, although the present building was not constructed until 1724, following its demolition during the English Civil War. St. Thomas' church dates from the 12th century, and was rebuilt in the 1815 after the original building was declared 'unsafe'. Both sites are now Grade II* listed.

Dudley Priory was a Cluniac priory founded circa 1160 by the Lord of Dudley, Gervase de Paganel, and controlled several churches in the surrounding area. After its initial dissolution in 1395, it reopened as a denizen priory, and remained in use until the Dissolution of the Monasteries. The ruins stand within Priory Park.

The Revd Robert Jones, present Archdeacon of Worcester, inducted in November 2014, was previously Vicar of St. Francis Church in Dudley for eight years.

St James's Church at Eve Hill was consecrated on 27 July 1840. It has been declared redundant and its final service took place on 28 July 2024.

Roman Catholics in the town are served by a church dedicated to Our Blessed Lady and St Thomas of Canterbury situated in St Joseph Street near the bus station. The church, designed by architect Augustus Pugin, dates from 1842 and has been Grade II listed since 1949.

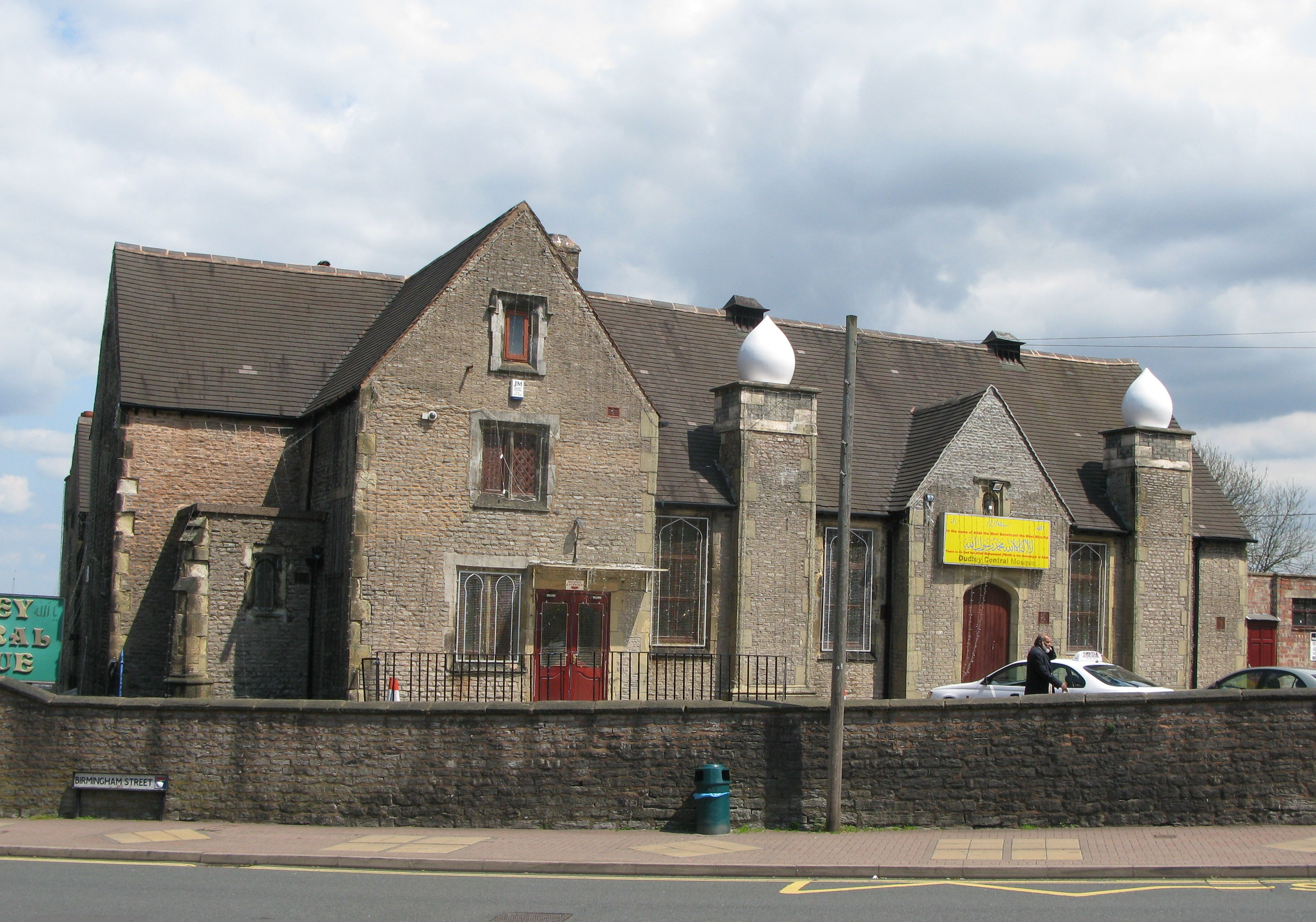
Dudley Central Mosque

Dudley also has places of worship for other religious groups and Christian denominations, including a Jehovah's Witness Kingdom Hall, two Sikh gurdwaras, and a Hindu temple. The old St Edmund's Church School, which closed in 1970 on a merger with St John's Church School, was converted into a mosque for the town's Islamic community, with an additional mosque also opening in the Queen's Cross area of the town.

=== Proposed mosque ===
In 2003, plans were unveiled for the construction of a new mosque (which become known as the "Super Mosque" locally) in Hall Street, a site that had been leased by Dudley Council to the Dudley Muslim Association, in exchange for a site impacted by a proposed bypass. The mosque proposals were scrapped in May 2010, after a long dispute, in favour of an expansion to the existing Dudley Central Mosque in Castle Hill. An appeal was lodged by the Dudley Muslim Association against the High Court ruling, and failed in February 2014.

== Media ==
Dudley is served by a number of local newspapers. The town has its own version of the Express & Star, published daily Monday to Saturday. There are also Dudley News, which is published weekly, and (based at Dudley Archives and Local History Centre on Tipton Road in Dudley) the Black Country Bugle, which looks at the history of Dudley and the rest of the Black Country.

BBC Radio WM, Free Radio (formerly Beacon Radio), Heart West Midlands, Greatest Hits West Midlands, and Smooth Radio 105.7 are some of the local radio stations that can be received in Dudley, also serving the wider West Midlands. Black Country Community Radio broadcasts online from its Dudley Studios serving The Central and Northern Black Country. The Kates Hill Press, founded in 1992 and named after a famous Dudley landmark, is a small press concentrating on the publishing of fiction and non-fiction of mainly local and regional interest.

== Economy ==
=== Retail ===
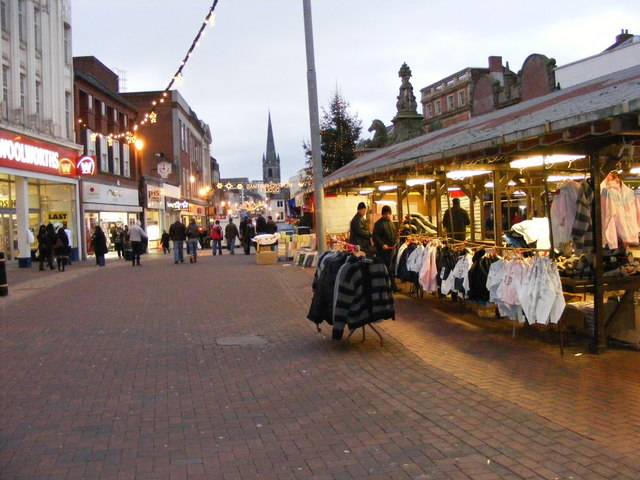
Dudley Market in 2008

As a commercial centre, Dudley's town centre has become increasingly run down; in 2012 nearly a third of its shop units lay vacant, the highest figure for a centre of its size in England. Retailing was particularly hard hit by the opening of the Merry Hill Shopping Centre 2.5 miles (4.0 km) away, between 1985 and 1990. This led to the exit of the majority of major retailers, including British Home Stores (June 1990), Marks & Spencer (August 1990), Sainsbury's (August 1989), C&A (January 1992), and Littlewoods (January 1990), all of which closed before or soon after new stores opened at Merry Hill. Although the town was already in slight decline at the time following the recession of the early 1980s, the opening of the Merry Hill Centre resulted in a 70% decline of the town's market share in retail between 1985 and 1990.

Successive economic downturns have led to most remaining major retailers leaving the town centre. Department store Beatties closed in 2010, WH Smith in 2013, River Island in 2020, and Argos in 2021; the town centre is now largely occupied by take-away restaurants, charity shops, and gambling centres. The variety of businesses left led to Dudley being named 'the worst place to shop in the UK' in a 2014 study, which drew condemnation from the local council.

The town's market remains a prominent local shopping destination. Established in the 12th century, it is situated on a wide part of the High Street. It has undergone numerous developments in its history, including pedestrianisation in 1982, removal of 12th-century cobblestone paving, and a large-scale redevelopment scheme in 2015.

=== Industry ===
The Bean Cars factory was opened in the first years of the twentieth century and remained in use until the 1930s, but survives to this day for other industrial use.

== Notable people ==
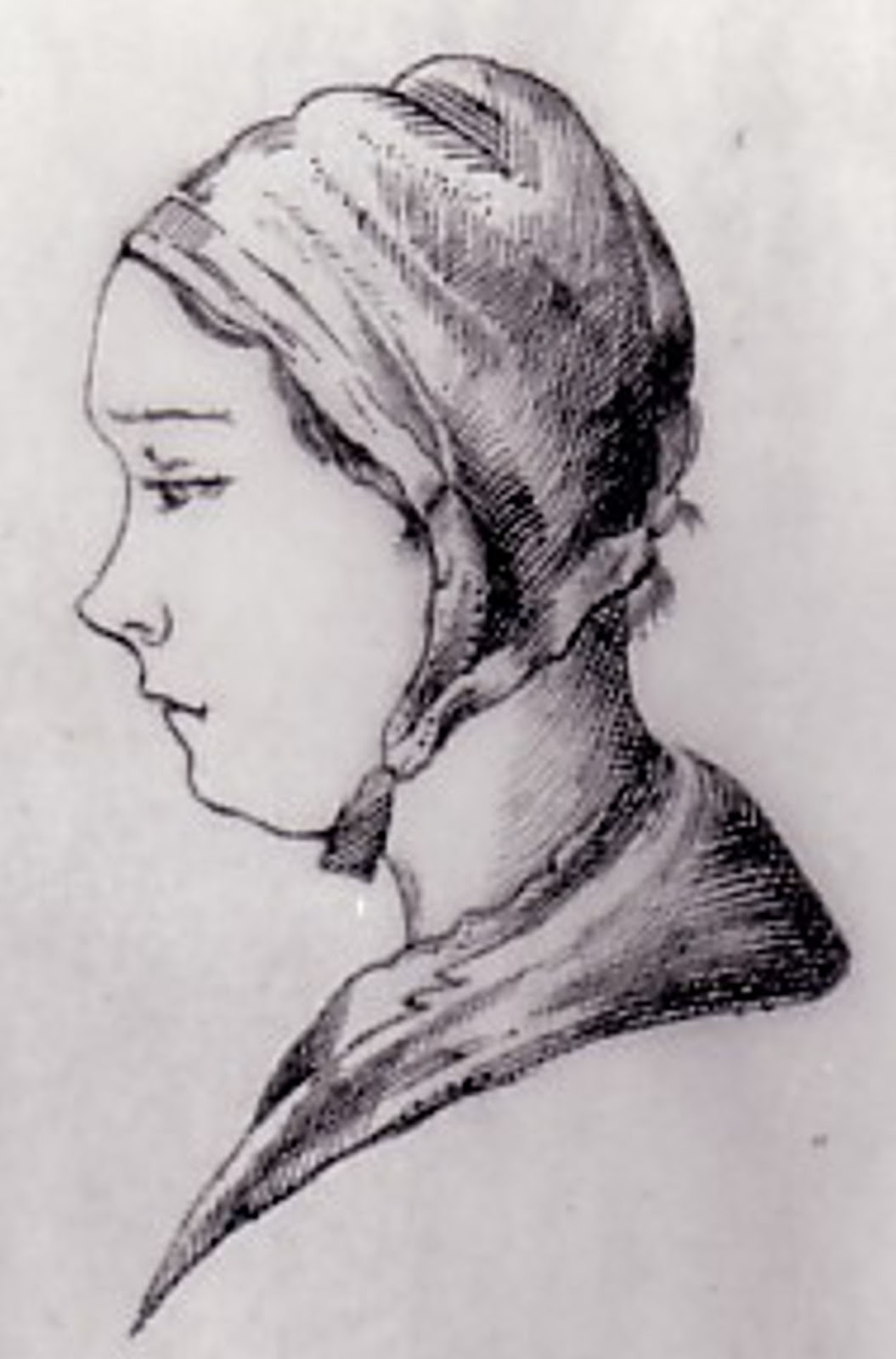
Catherine Payton Phillips

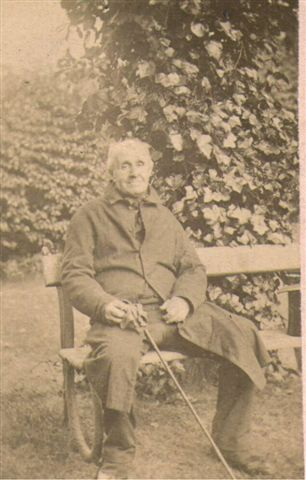
John Badley, Surgeon 1865

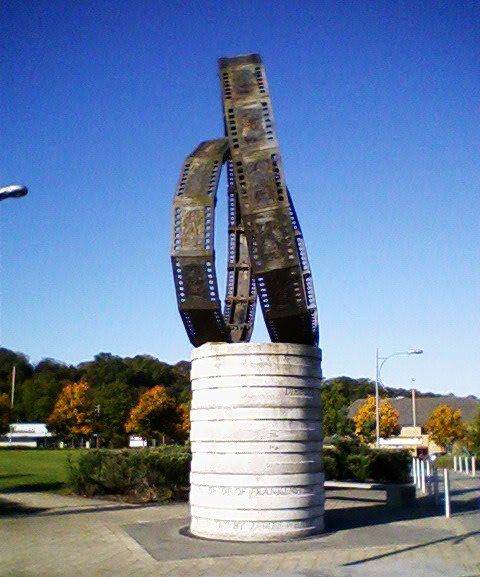
Sculpture for James Whale, outside Dudley Showcase Cinema.

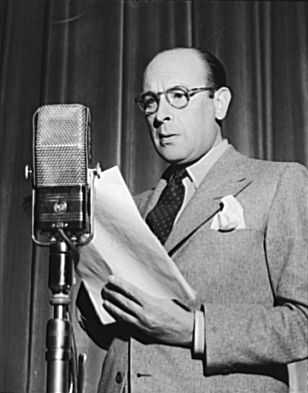
Cedric Hardwicke

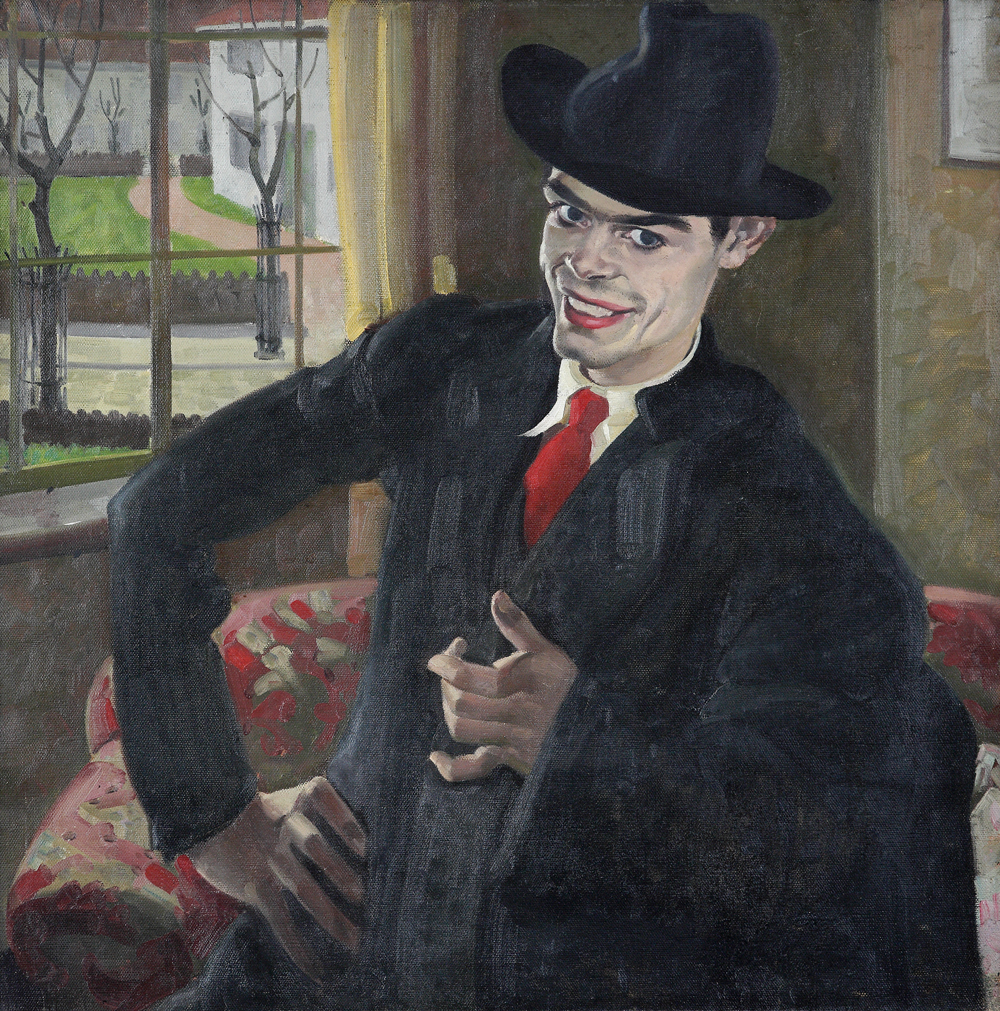
Percy Shakespeare

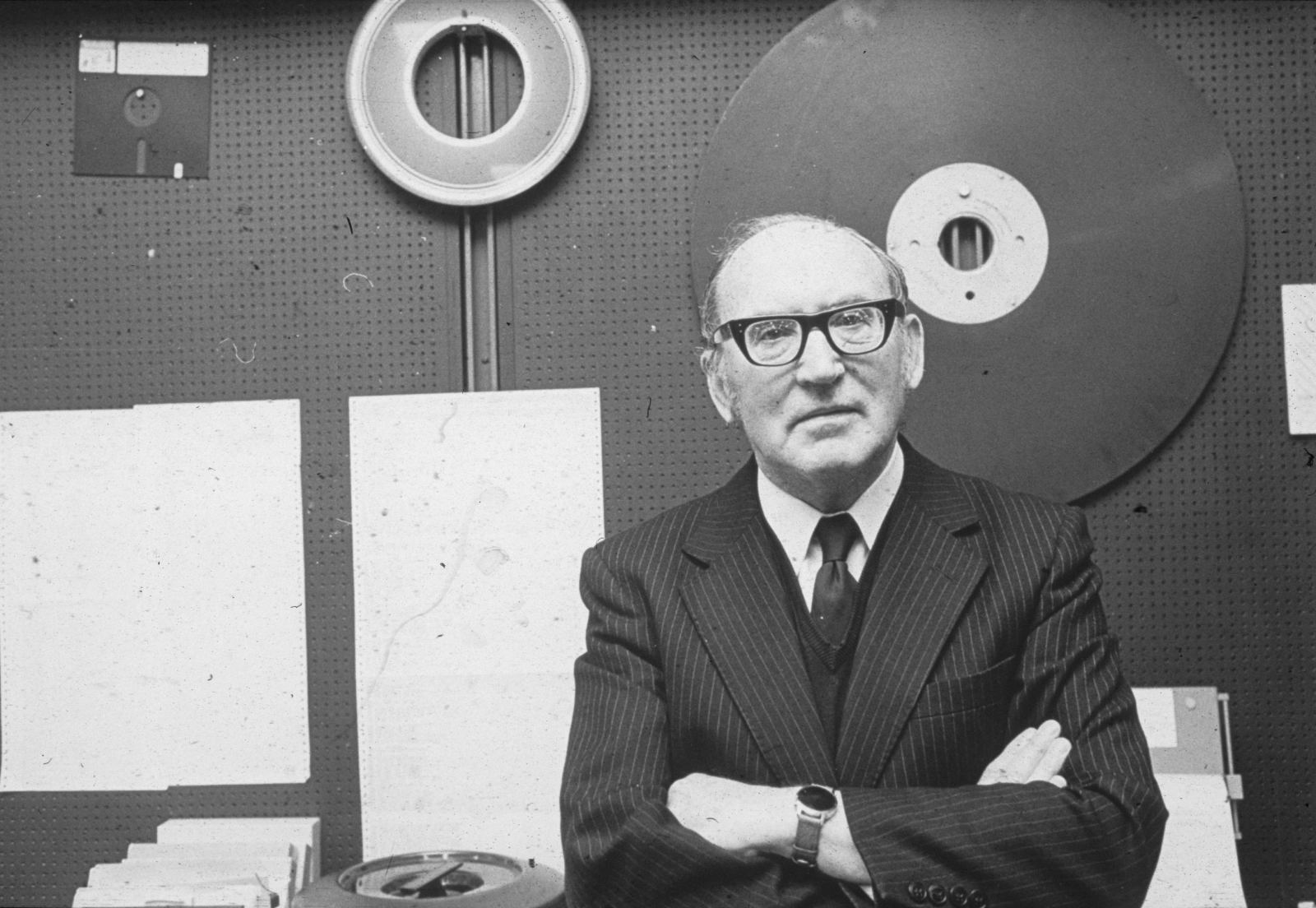
Maurice Vincent Wilkes 1980

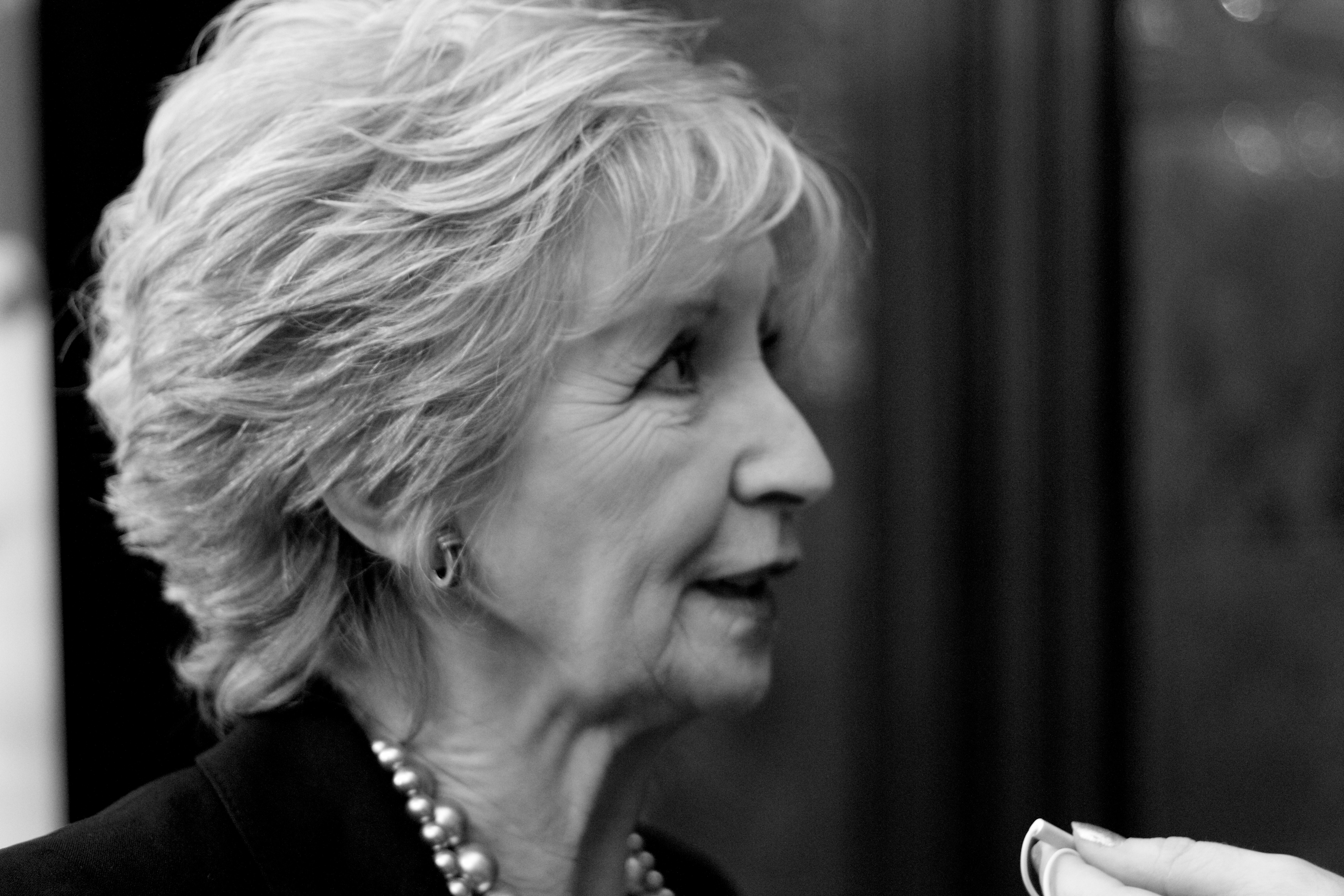
Sue Lawley

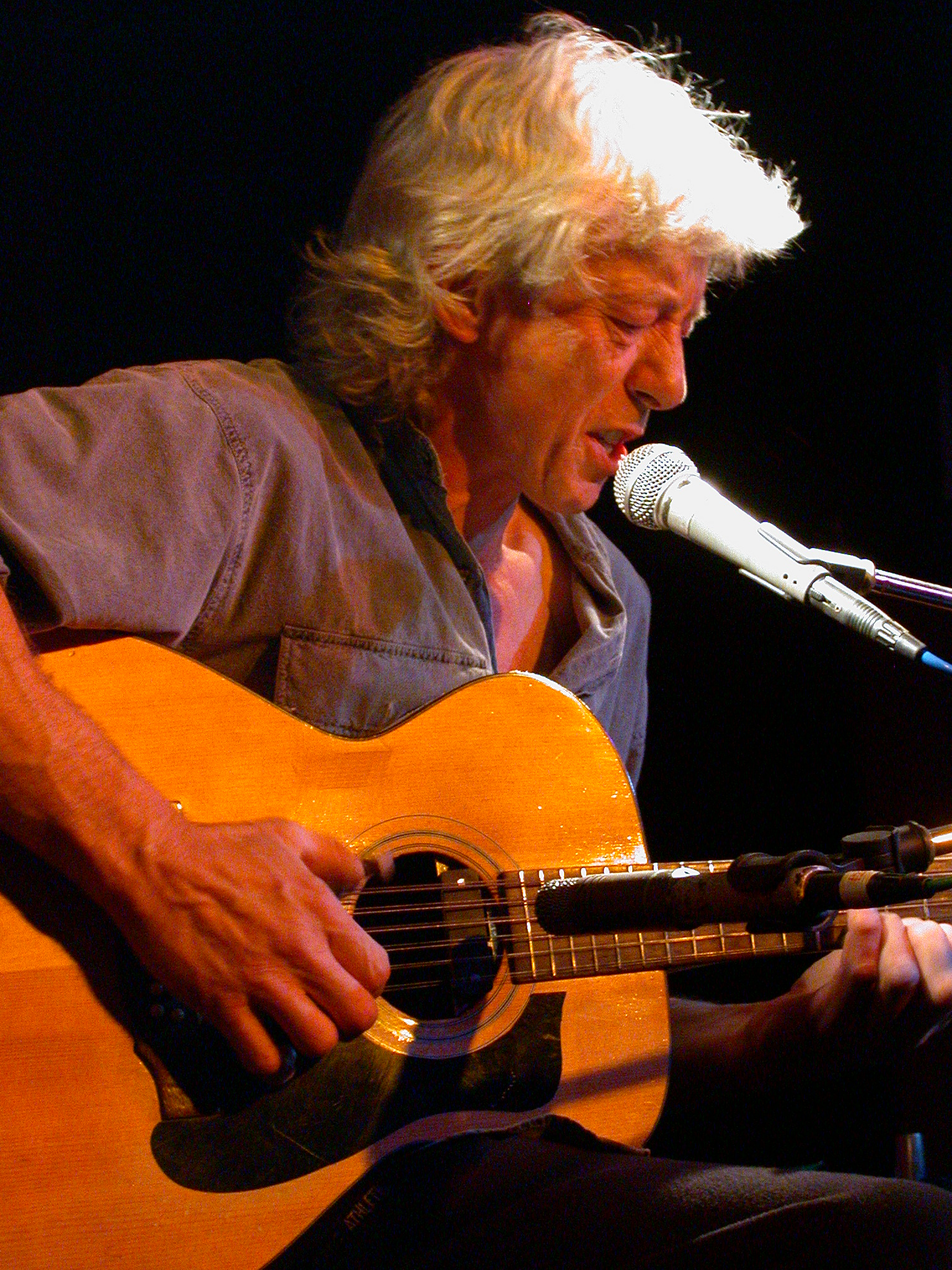
Nigel Mazlyn Jones

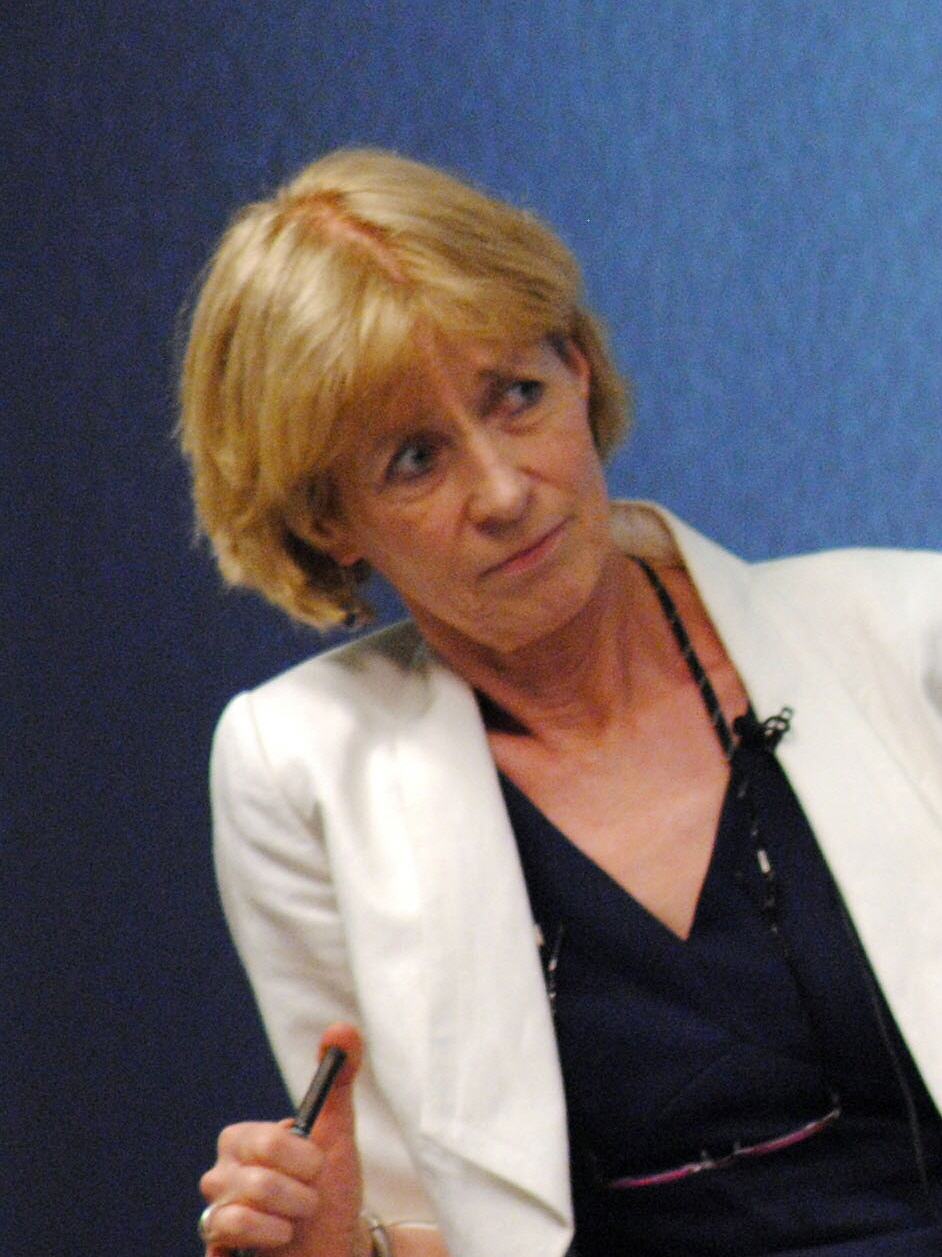
Rosemary Hollis

=== Early times to 1800 ===
- Sir John de Sutton II (1310–1359) the first Baron Sutton of Dudley
- Sir John de Sutton IV (1361–1396) the 3rd Baron Sutton of Dudley and heir of Dudley Castle
- John Sutton, 1st Baron Dudley, (1400–1487) English nobleman, diplomat and councillor of Henry VI
- Sir Edmund Sutton (1425 in Dudley – c.1485) the eldest son of John Sutton, 1st Baron Dudley, fought in Wars of the Roses
- Sir Henry Dudley (1517 in Dudley Castle – 1568) English soldier, sailor, diplomat, and conspirator of the Tudor period.
- Abraham Darby I (1678 in Woodsetton – 1717), industrial pioneer, developed the first practical method to produce iron using coke instead of charcoal
- Henry Sanders (1727 in Dudley – 1785) English curate and local historian, curate of Shenstone, Staffordshire
- Catherine Payton Phillips (1727 in Dudley – 1794) Quaker Minister, travelled the UK, Holland and the American colonies
- Reverend Luke Booker (1762 in Nottingham – 1835). Vicar of St. Edmunds, Dudley and author
- Ben Boucher (1769 in Horseley Heath – 1851), folk poet, wrote about Dudley life in the 19th century
- Thomas Phillips (1770 in Dudley – 1845) leading English portrait and subject painter
- Reverend Joseph Cooke (1775 in Dudley – 1811), a Free Christian, expelled by the Wesleyan Methodists on doctrinal grounds, became the inspiration of the Methodist Unitarian movement
- John Badley (1783 in Dudley – 1870), surgeon of Dudley and medical pioneer.
- Samuel Cook (1786–1861), moved to Dudley in 1819, prominent local political campaigner against social inequality and for workers' and women's rights
- Theophillus Dunn (c. 1790 – 1851) Fortune teller and magical healer from Netherton, known as the "Dudley Devil".
- Robert Wallace (1791 in Dudley – 1850) English Unitarian minister.

=== 1800 to 1900 ===
- Thomas William Booker-Blakemore (1801 in Dudley – 1858), MP, industrialist, landowner, and politician, son of Reverend Luke Booker
- Joseph William Moss (1803 in Dudley – 1862) was an English physician.
- John Berryman (1825 in Dudley – 1896) British Army officer, awarded the Victoria Cross and a recipient of the Victoria Cross for action in the Crimean War
- Brooke Robinson (1836 in Dudley – 1911) solicitor, county coroner and Conservative MP for Dudley from 1886 to 1906
- Frederick Herbert Torrington (1836 in Dudley – 1917) conductor, organist, and founder of the Toronto College of Music
- Frank Evers Beddard (1858 in Dudley – 1925) English zoologist, he became a leading authority on annelids, including earthworms and oligochaetes.
- Genie Sheppard (1863 in Dudley – 1953), militant force-fed suffragette and medical doctor
- John Haden Badley (1865 in Dudley – 1967), Educator, founded (1893) and Headmaster (1893–1935) of Bedales School
- Sir William Charles Angliss (1865 in Dudley – 1957) butcher, pastoralist, pioneer meat exporter, politician and philanthropist in Melbourne, Victoria, Australia, knighted in 1939
- Captain H. J. Round (1881 in Kingswinford – 1966) English engineer, pioneer of radio, reported observation of electroluminescence from a diode
- James Whale (1889 in Dudley – 1957), Horror film director, known for his films Frankenstein, The Old Dark House, The Invisible Man and Bride of Frankenstein
- Sir Cedric Hardwicke (1893 in Lye – 1964) stage and film actor whose career spanned nearly fifty years

=== 1900 to 1950 ===
- Bert Bissell (1902 in Dudley – 1998), mountain climber, peace campaigner. Dudley was twinned with Fort William in his honour.
- Percy Shakespeare (1906 in Kates Hill – 1943), artist with a talent for figure drawing and portraits
- Charles Coulson (1910 in Dudley – 1974) British applied mathematician, theoretical chemist and religious author
- John Metcalfe Coulson (1910 in Dudley – 1990) British chemical engineering academic and twin of Charles Alfred Coulson
- John English (1911 in Dudley – 1998), theatre director and founder of the Midlands Arts Centre
- Sir Maurice Wilkes (1913 in Dudley – 2010) a significant British computer scientist
- Ian Messiter (1920 in Dudley – 1999) BBC Radio producer and the creator of a number of panel games, including most famously Radio 4's Just a Minute
- Billy Dainty (1927 in Dudley – 1986) British comedian, dancer, physical comedian and pantomime and television star
- Roger Cashmore (born 1944) went to school in Dudley, Chair of the United Kingdom Atomic Energy Authority, previously the Principal of Brasenose College, Oxford and Professor of Experimental Physics at the University of Oxford
- Sue Lawley (born 1946 in Sedgley) is an English TV and radio broadcaster.

=== 1950 to present ===
- Nigel Mazlyn Jones (born 1950 in Dudley) English guitarist, singer and songwriter, also did part-time work at Dudley Zoo
- Professor Rosemary Hollis (born 1952 in Dudley - 2020) political scientist, professor Middle East Policy Studies City University London
- Norman Pace (born 1953 in Dudley) English actor and comedian, one half of the comedy duo Hale and Pace
- Will Duckworth (born 1954 in Dudley) Green Party of England and Wales politician
- Susan Price (born 1955 in Dudley) English author, she mainly writes children's literature and young adult fiction
- Sir Lenny Henry (born 1958 in Dudley), stand-up comedian, actor, blues singer, writer and TV presenter
- John Barnes (born 1961 in Dudley) radio broadcaster and journalist for the BBC.
- Jim MacCool (born 1963) British dramatic poet in the shanachie or travelling bard tradition, also poet-in-residence for Dudley
- Jason Bonham (born 1966 in Dudley), drummer, son of Led Zeppelin drummer John Bonham
- Carl Trueman (born 1967 in Dudley), Reformed theologian and historian, professor at Grove City College, Pennsylvania
- Andrew Griffiths (born 1970 in Dudley) Conservative MP for Burton since 2010
- Jas Mann (born 1971 in Dudley) British songwriter, singer, record producer, film producer and lead singer of Babylon Zoo
- Shafiq Rasul (born 1977 in Dudley) a detainee held at Guantanamo Bay
- Warren Nettleford (born 1982 in Dudley) television presenter and reporter

=== Sport up to 1950 ===
- Joe Darby (1861 in Windmill End, Netherton – 1937), Champion spring jumper (jumping starting from a stationary position)
- Bert Baverstock (1883 in Dudley – 1951) English footballer, spent sixteen years with Bolton Wanderers making 369 appearances
- Charles Mayo (1884 in Dudley – 1977) English professional golfer
- Joe Smith (1889 in Dudley – 1971), footballer and football manager of Blackpool for the 1953 FA Cup final victory over Bolton, dubbed the "Matthews Final"
- Herbert Homer (1895 in Dudley – 1977) cricketer and cricket administrator, 85 appearances for Staffordshire
- Dorothy Round (1909 in Dudley – 1982), tennis player and Wimbledon women's singles champion in 1934 and 1937
- Gladys Morcom (1918 in Dudley – 2010) British swimmer in the women's 400 metre freestyle at the 1936 Summer Olympics
- Audrey Hancock (born 1919 in Dudley - 2017) British swimmer in the women's 100 metre backstroke at the 1936 Summer Olympics
- Dennis Stevens (1933 in Dudley – 2012) English footballer, played mainly for Bolton Wanderers and Everton
- Albert Broadbent (1934 in Dudley – October 2006) footballer, scored 99 goals in 485 appearances mainly for Doncaster Rovers
- Duncan Edwards (1936 in Woodside – 1958), England footballer who died in the Munich air disaster. One of the members of Manchester United's popular Busby Babes The Dudley Southern Bypass was renamed 'Duncan Edwards Way' in his memory, and a statue of him was erected in the town Market Place in 1999
- George Andrews (born 23 April 1942) English former professional footballer, making over 400 appearances, scoring 149 goals mainly at Southport, Shrewsbury Town and Walsall
- Phil Parkes (born 1950 in Sedgley) is a former football goalkeeper for Queens Park Rangers and West Ham United making 743 appearances

=== Sport since 1950 ===
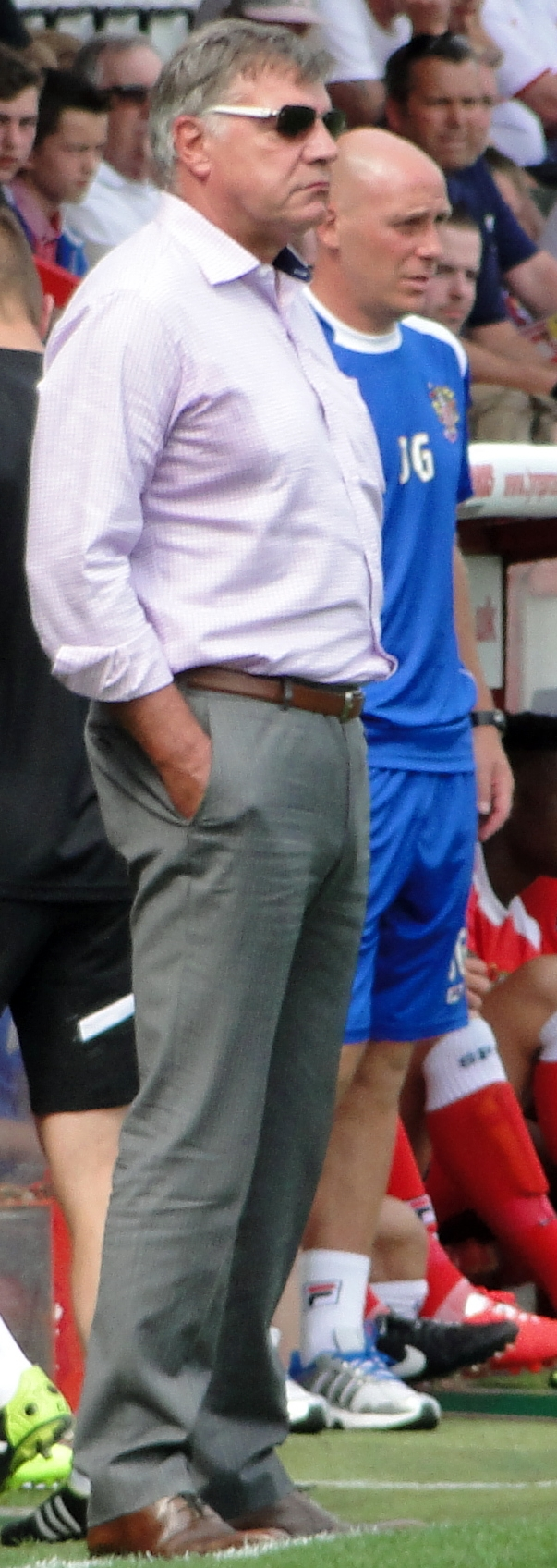
Sam Allardyce, 2014

- Sam Allardyce (born 1954 in Dudley), English football player and manager as well as a former England football manager.
- Clive Allen (born 1961 in Dudley) British basketball coach and former player with Birmingham Bullets
- Adrian Rollinson (born 1965 in Dudley) British strongman competitor, repeat competitor at the World's Strongest Man
- Michael Rosswess (born 1965 in Dudley) retired English sprinter, in the 200 metres event at the 1988 Summer Olympics
- David Burrows (born 1968 in Dudley), retired professional footballer, played mainly for Liverpool and Coventry City
- Richard Forsyth (born 1970 in Dudley) English footballer, made nearly 250 appearances for Stoke City Peterborough United and Cheltenham Town
- Robert Norton (born 1972 in Dudley) British professional boxer, southpaw cruiserweight
- Chris Westwood (born 1977 in Dudley) footballer, made over 500 appearances, most for Hartlepool United
- Darren McDermott (born 1978 in Dudley) English middleweight boxer and the current holder of the English middleweight title
- Reanne Evans (born 1985 in Dudley) English former professional snooker player, won WLBSA Ladies World Snooker Championship twelve times between 2005 and 2019
- Russell Penn (born 1985 in Dudley) professional footballer, mainly played for Kidderminster Harriers, Cheltenham Town and York City
- Matthew Barnes-Homer (born 1986 in Dudley) English professional footballer who mainly played for Kidderminster Harriers, Luton Town and Macclesfield Town
- Asa Hall (born 1986 in Dudley) professional footballer, mainly played for Luton Town, Oxford United and Cheltenham Town
- Luke Tilt (born 1986 in Dudley), footballer
- Reece Brown (born 1996 in Dudley) English footballer who plays for Peterborough United, on loan from Huddersfield Town
- Tyler Bate (born 1997 in Dudley) British professional wrestler who is currently signed to WWE

== In popular culture ==
- The front and inner photographs for the 1971 Led Zeppelin IV album were taken in the Eve Hill area of the town; the main tower block, shown side on, is Butterfield Court off Salop Street, and still stands. The two other blocks were demolished in 1999.
- The borehole in local author Hugh Walters' juvenile science fiction story The Mohole Mystery was sited in Dudley.
- The television comedy series The Grimleys was set in Dudley, and was filmed approximately 80 miles (130 km) away in Salford.
- Dudley is the home town of a famous comedy TV character, Barry, in the 1980s series Auf Wiedersehen Pet.

== Sport ==
=== Association football ===
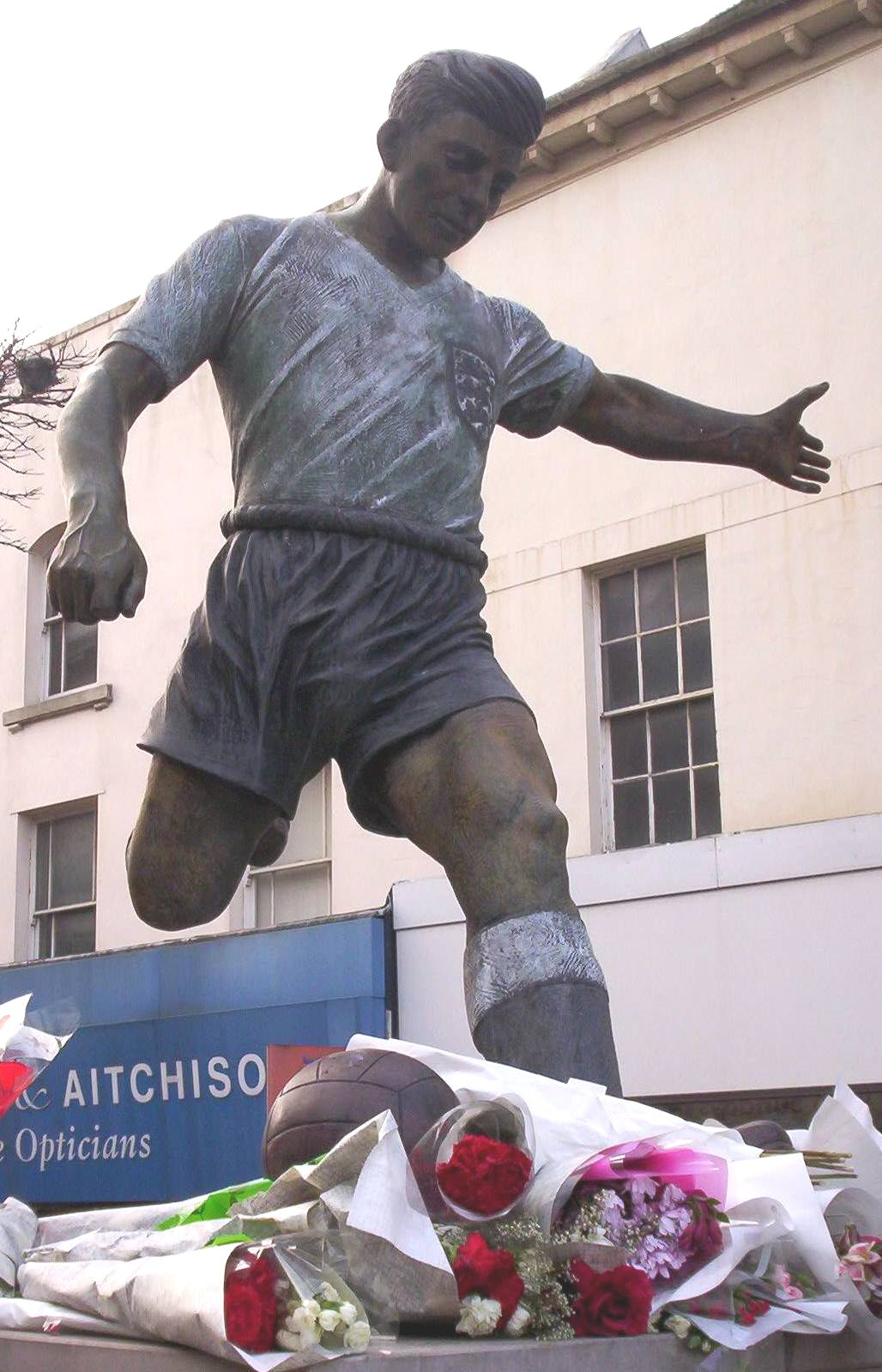
Footballer Duncan Edwards (1936–1958), was born in Woodside, Dudley, and is commemorated by a statue in the town centre.

The town's key football teams are Dudley Town formed in 1888 and Dudley Sports formed in 1979.

Dudley Town's most notable success came in 1985 when they won promotion to the Southern Premier League. In the same year, they were forced to quit Dudley Sports Centre (at the junction of Tipton Road and Birmingham Road) due to mining subsidence and have ground-shared outside the town ever since. Home matches are played at Noose Lane in Willenhall. In 1981, when still playing at the Dudley Sports Centre, Dudley Town played a prestigious game against Wolverhampton Wanderers to commemorate a refurbishment of the stadium, with the new floodlights being switched on by legendary former Wolves player Billy Wright.

=== Rugby football ===
The Dudley Kingswinford Rugby Club is the local rugby team, which play at their grounds in Wall Heath.

=== Motor sports ===
For a short period, a speedway team called Dudley Heathens attempted to find a site to race in Dudley. The team plays in Wolverhampton and Birmingham due to the lack of a speedway track within the Dudley borough. The team were originally called the Cradley Heath Heathens, due to the proximity of their home track at Dudley Wood Stadium to the Cradley Heath/Dudley boundary. The stadium was demolished in the mid-1990s to make way for housing development, with the club disbanding shortly afterwards, before it re-formed with the name Dudley Heathens in 2010. Though there have been attempts by the club to move back into the town, they have so far been rejected by the local authority. The team re-adopted the name Cradley Heathens in 2013. Former World Champion riders from the team include Erik Gundersen and Bruce Penhall.

=== Volleyball ===
Following a merger with the Coseley Volleyball Club, Wombourne V.C. play at the Evolve campus of Dudley College, in the town centre. They compete in the West Midlands Volleyball Association.

== Twin towns ==
Dudley is twinned with:

- Fort William, Scotland

== Bibliography ==
- Lloyd, David (1993), A History of Worcestershire, Chichester: Phillimore, ISBN 9780850336580, LCCN 94109314, OCLC 30027275, OL 1140253M
