= List of areas in Sandwell =

This is a list of areas in the Metropolitan Borough of Sandwell, West Midlands, England.

- Balls Hill
- Bearwood
- Black Lake
- Black Patch
- Bloomfield
- Brades Village
- Brandhall
- Brickhouse Farm
- Bristnall Fields
- Burnt Tree
- Causeway Green
- Charlemont
- Cherry Orchard
- Church Hill
- Churchfield
- Cock Green
- Cradley Heath
- The Cronefields
- Darby's Hill
- Dudley Port
- Fallings Heath, Wednesbury
- Friar Park
- Golds Green
- Grace Mary Estate
- Great Barr
- Great Bridge
- Greets Green
- Grove Vale
- Guns Village
- Haden Cross
- Hall End, West Bromwich
- Hall Green
- Hampstead
- Harvills Hawthorn
- Hateley Heath
- Hill Top
- Hill Top, Oldbury
- Horsley Heath
- King's Hill, Wednesbury
- Lambert's End
- Langley
- Langley Green
- Londonderry
- Lyndon, West Bromwich
- Mayers Green
- Mesty Croft
- Mouse Sweet
- Newton
- New Town
- Oakham
- Ocker Hill
- Oldbury
- Old Hill
- Portway
- Princes End
- Rood End
- Round's Green
- Rowley Regis
- Sandwell
- Smethwick
- Soho
- Springfield
- Stone Cross, West Bromwich
- Summer Hill
- Swan Village
- Tat Bank
- The Knowle
- Tibbington
- Tippity Green
- Tipton
- Tipton Green
- Titford
- Tividale
- Tividale Hall
- Toll End
- Turner's Hill
- Vicarage, Wednesbury
- Warley Woods
- Wednesbury
- Wednesbury Oak
- West Bromwich
- West Smethwick
- Whiteheath Gate
- Wood Green, Wednesbury
- The Woods
- Yew Tree
