= Q3 Academy Tipton =

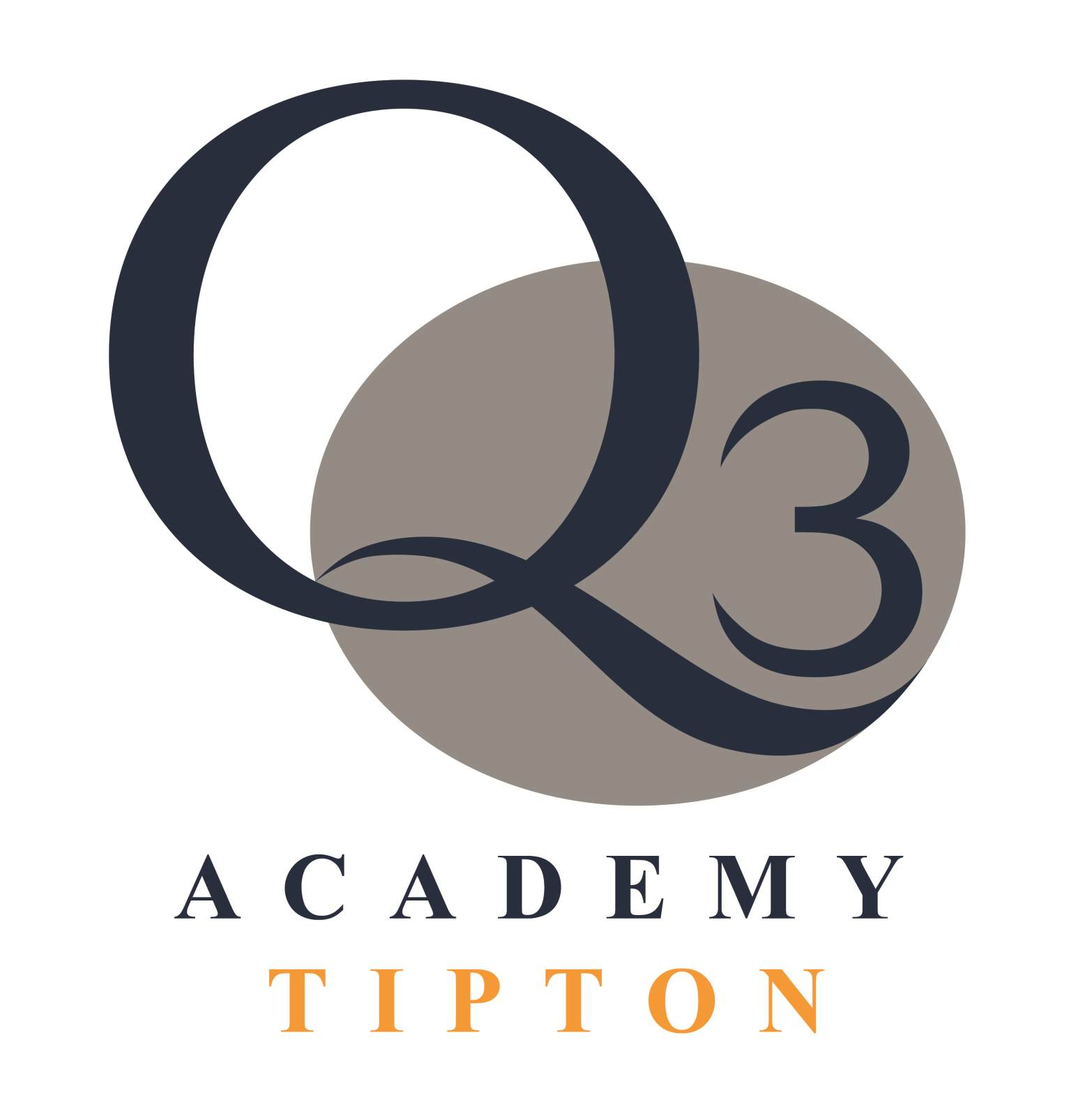

Location
- Alexandra Road; Tipton, West Midlands, DY4 7NR; England; 52.53215°N 2.04972°W

Information
- Former names: Tipton County Grammar School Alexandra High School and Sixth Form Centre The ACE Academy
- Type: Academy
- Motto: Knowing More, Doing More, Achieving More
- Established: 1927
- Trust: The Mercian Trust
- Department for Education URN: 146383 Tables
- Ofsted: Reports
- Head Teacher: Mr A Slack
- Gender: Coeducational
- Age: 11 to 16
- Enrollment: 1371
- Houses: Beacon Clent Himley Kinver
- Colours: Blue, yellow
- Website: q3tipton.org.uk

Q3 Academy Tipton is a coeducational secondary school located in Tipton in the West Midlands of England.

== Admissions ==
Q3 Academy mainly serves children aged 11–16 years for KS3 and 16–18 for Sixth Form. Pupils who mainly live in the Great Bridge, Tibbington, Horseley Heath and Tipton Green areas of the town attend the school.

It is situated on Alexandra Road (B4517) towards Toll End (and West Bromwich) and near the crossroads with Church Lane (B4163) and the fire station. It is about a mile from the A41/A461 roundabout at Great Bridge, and about a half-mile north of Dudley Port railway station.

== History ==
=== Grammar school ===
The school was opened in 1927 as Tipton Central School. It served the local area as a grammar school for boys and girls, and its title was soon altered to Tipton County Grammar School, situated on Alexandra Road. It was administered by the South-West Divisional Executive of Staffordshire Education Committee (based in Dudley), then West Bromwich Education Committee with around 700 boys and girls. The buildings were expanded in 1962 to include a new school hall, kitchen, dining hall, swimming pool, gymnasium and Science classrooms. This building was demolished in the mid-1990s following further extensions to the site.

=== Comprehensive ===
Tipton Grammar merged with nearby Park Lane Secondary School in Queens Road in September 1969 and became a comprehensive school. It took the title of Alexandra High School at this time. 'O' Level and 'A' Level pupils were educated at the original site in Alexandra Road, while the younger pupils mostly attended the Park Lane buildings (which dated back to 1904).

New buildings were added to the Alexandra Road site at the beginning of the 1980s, giving younger pupils a chance to have three days a week at the main site, although they still used the Park Lane site twice a week until it closed in July 1990, being demolished the following year. Since September 1990, the school has also lost its popularity with children living in the Tipton Green area of the town, with a significant percentage of children in this area selecting Dormston School or High Arcal School in Sedgley as their destination for secondary school following the reduction in the Dudley borough's secondary transfer age from 12 to 11, bringing it into line with Sandwell and the rest of the region.

A new sixth form centre was built in 1995 and the early 1980s extensions were demolished in 2011 to make way for new classrooms.

The school went through a £23 million redevelopment in 2012 with a new STEM block, with the school now being called Alexandra College of Enterprise.

=== Academy ===
The school converted to academy status on 1 March 2013, and was reopened by Prince Edward, Earl of Wessex as The ACE Academy. The school was sponsored by the University of Wolverhampton's Education Central Multi Academy Trust.

The school changed hands in November 2018 and is now controlled by the Q3 Multi Academies Trust.

== Academic performance ==
In 2006, 25% of GCSE students attained 5 grades at 'C' or above. This placed the school at 13th out of 18 schools in Sandwell. By 2009, it had progressed further with 38% of pupils achieving similar results, placing it as joint eighth of the 17 schools in the borough. This is well under the England average, similar to most schools in Sandwell: only two schools get GCSE results above average.

At A level, results are low, similar again to most schools in Sandwell that offer A levels. The average result in 2024, based on 37 students who sat A levels, was C− which is lower than the national average, B−.

== Notable former pupils ==
=== Alexandra High School and Sixth Form Centre ===
- David Burrows, former West Bromwich Albion and Liverpool player
- Shafiq Rasul, Asif Iqbal and Ruhal Ahmed, incarcerated in Guantanamo Bay detention camp after being accused of fighting for the Taliban in Afghanistan; later released without charge

=== Tipton Grammar School ===
- Philip Bradbourn OBE, Conservative MEP since 1999 for the West Midlands
- Joe Mayo, former West Bromwich Albion and Leyton Orient footballer
