= Ben Boucher =

English poet

- Born: 1769; Horseley Heath, Tipton, England
- Died: 1851 (aged 81–82)
- Occupation: Poet
- Writing career
- Notable work: "Lines On Dudley Market"

Ben Boucher (1769-1851) was an English poet who described life in Dudley in the Black Country during the 19th century.

== Biography ==
Ben Boucher was born in 1769 at Horseley Heath, Tipton and was a collier by trade.

According to one source: he "inherited by nature a lot of native humour and vivacity, he was essentially a "collier," fond of his beer, and jolly company to boot. He managed by considerable industry to acquire the knowledge of reading and writing, which enabled him to put in rhyme his "doggerel ideas " of things in general.

He wrote a poem in 1827 describing in detail Dudley Market.

A poem dated November 1837, entitled "On the Melancholy Occurrences which took place at Brierleyhill and Cradley Forge, November 1, I837" had under the title: "By Ben Boucher (a Working Collier)".

A number of his poems are included in the book The Curiosities of Dudley and the Black Country by C.F.G. Clarke published in 1881. According to Clarke, he was commemorated with the rhyme:

Oh! rare Ben Boucher, Boucher Ben; The best of Poets, but worst of men.

Clarke also adds: "the greater part of his singular and irregular life was spent in Dudley, at certain favourite public house haunts, where his talents were appreciated, and his songs admired and read by the curious". According to Clarke, Boucher was "a great Tory" and was supported by political association and sympathy in his latter days. Boucher fell on hard times towards the end of his life, becoming homeless and very poor. He reputedly died in the workhouse in 1851 although his grand-daughter wrote to a newspaper in 1902, claiming to have witnessed his death at a house in The Dock, Dudley.

== Works ==
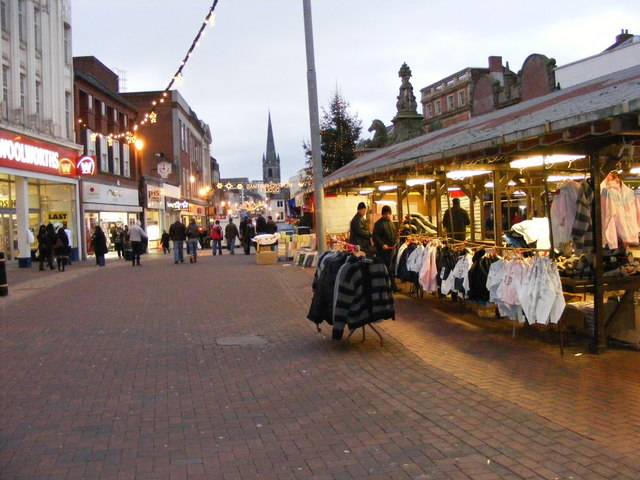
Dudley Market with St Thomas's Church in the background, 2011. Boucher wrote about this market in 1827. He also wrote about the demolition of the old St Thomas's Church

Ben Boucher sold his poems around the Dudley area, reportedly charging a penny a sheet. According to C.F.G Clarke, he wrote many hundred comical verses but only a few of his poems have been preserved.

According to Clarke, Boucher "took up all sorts of sad, grim, and pleasurable subjects, from the hanging of some wretch at Stafford Gaol, to a dog, or cock fight at Sedgley, or Tipton".

On the death of Dr. Luke Booker, Vicar of Dudley (which happened away from Dudley):

St. Luke is dead—a Poet and Divine—

I hope his spirit doth in glory shine.

To save expense, and the roads being ugly,

Or the Doctor would have come to Dudley.

Written after the old St. Thomas’s Church, Dudley was demolished (and some furnishings sent to nearby Gornal):

The seats and the windows, ah, and the clock too,

Were sent on to Gornal, to their Gornal crew;

For the sand men and asses, for to go to church,

And the people of Dudley were left in the lurch.

Opening of "Lines On Dudley Market", 1827:

At Dudley Market, now I tell,

Most kind of articles they sell;

The women take the greatest care

To buy up crocks and earthenware,

Milkpans, and colliers’ tots,

Coloured cups and chamber-pots.

Old shoes to sell, there stands close by,

With shabby strings—the same they tie;

If in those shoes you walk about,

The bottoms soon will tumble out—

On a horse kept in poor condition by a local tailor:

His back it is both long and thin,

His belly has got no corn therein;

He looks both naked and forlorn,

And takes the whip instead of corn.

On a Waterloo Veteran:

Charley was young and in his prime,

A courting went to widow Pincher;

She was shy, and fair, and fine,

He was constant and no flincher.

The time arrived when they got married,

She had houses, and cows, Sirs, four,

But Charley soon them all did swallid,

And left her in an evil hour;

He went and drank just like an ass,

Then came home as you may guess

And found her dead; but was not wise,

So he’d make her do the exercise;

The women did not like such jokes,

So they sent off for T. Pitt Stokes—

Who neck and crop to the Workhouse took him

And in the dungeon they did hook him.

This madman told the gentlemen,

That he would fetch her back again,

So they kept him there till she was buried,

When he got home he was most worried.

Boucher wrote a number of poems on the politics of Dudley. According to a newspaper article written after his death, Boucher would take payment for writing poems attacking political opponents. For example on the occasion of the 1832 election he wrote poems in support of the candidate John Campbell, including one mocking Campbell's opponent, Sir Horace St. Paul, entitled Tripe and cowheels.

A newspaper article quotes the chorus of a poem written as an "election squib" around 1832:

Each proud upstart Tory

Was top full of glory

Whilst filling his belly with tripe.

On the local Radical politician Samuel Cook, who owned a draper's shop in Dudley High Street, he wrote:

In Dudley town there lives a man

Who deals in silk and clothes, sir;

If you trust him your mutton to Cook,

He’ll be sure to spoil your broth, sir.

John Williams was a draper of the town who had supported reform and had been the Chairman of the reformist electoral campaign for Worcestershire in 1831. This had allegedly resulted in him being expelled from the Bowling Green by political opponents. For the 1832 Dudley campaign, Williams supported the anti-reform candidate, inspiring Boucher to write:

Where is big John the draper gone,

Chairman at last election,

The Bowling Green, that source of spleen

Which led to his detection.

On the Dudley Election of 1834 (won by Thomas Hawkes)

Hawkes to Cape—ll gave a note,

And for five pounds bought his vote;

He therefore thus did change his coat

And to the Tories gave his vote.

== Commemoration ==
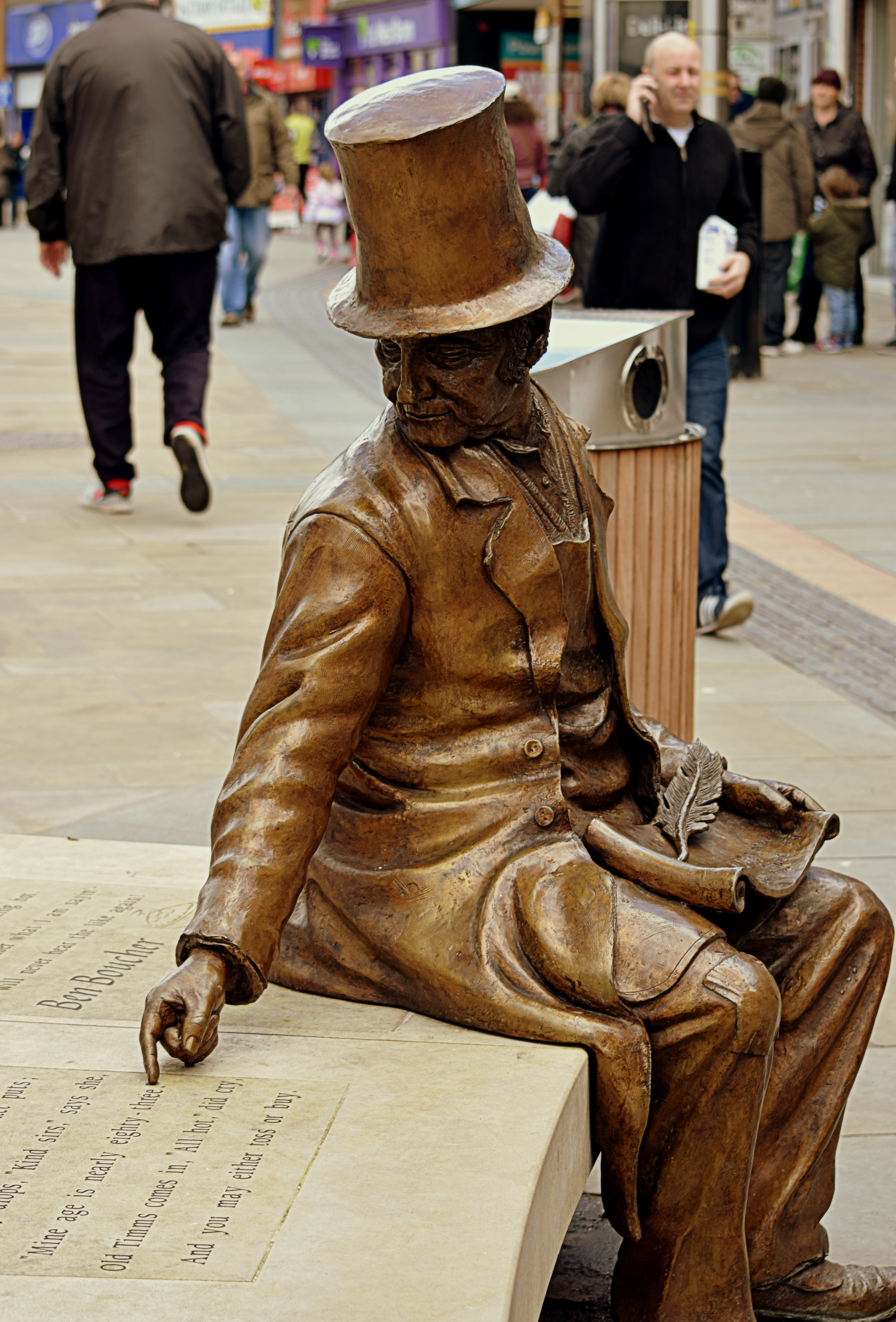
This Bronze statue of Ben Boucher sculpted by John McKenna from a design of Steve Field, Dudley Borough public artist, was commissioned by Dudley MBC for Dudley Town centre, 2015

An oil painting of Boucher was made during his lifetime, reportedly at the Miners Arms public house. A photograph of the portrait was reproduced in the book The Curiosities of Dudley and the Black Country by C.F.G. Clarke published in 1881.

As part of the refurbishment of Dudley Market, a bronze statue of Ben Boucher, designed by artist Steve Field and sculpted by John McKenna, was placed on one of a pair of specially-built benches near the fountain at one end of the marketplace in 2015. The benches, constructed using Portland stone, are inscribed with Boucher's "Lines On Dudley Market".
