= Victoria Infant School =

Victoria Infant School may refer to:

- Victoria Infant School (Barrow-in-Furness)
- Victoria Infant School (Tipton)
