= Albert Langford =

English footballer (1899–1965)

Personal information
- Full name: Albert Edward Langford
- Date of birth: 16 October 1899
- Place of birth: Tipton, England
- Date of death: 1965 (aged 65–66)
- Position: Full-back

Senior career*
Years	Team	Apps	(Gls)
1920–1923	Merthyr Town	106	(1)
1923–1927	Swansea Town	78	(0)
1927–1928	Worcester City		
1928–1932	Charlton Athletic	135	(1)
1932–1933	Walsall	24	(1)
1933	Dudley Town		
Total		343	(3)
- * Club domestic league appearances and goals

Albert Edward Langford (16 October 1899 – 1965) was an English footballer who played in the Football League for Charlton Athletic, Merthyr Town, Swansea Town and Walsall.
