= Sheepwash Urban Park =

Local Nature Reserve in the West Midlands, England

Coordinates: 52.5227°N 2.0395°W

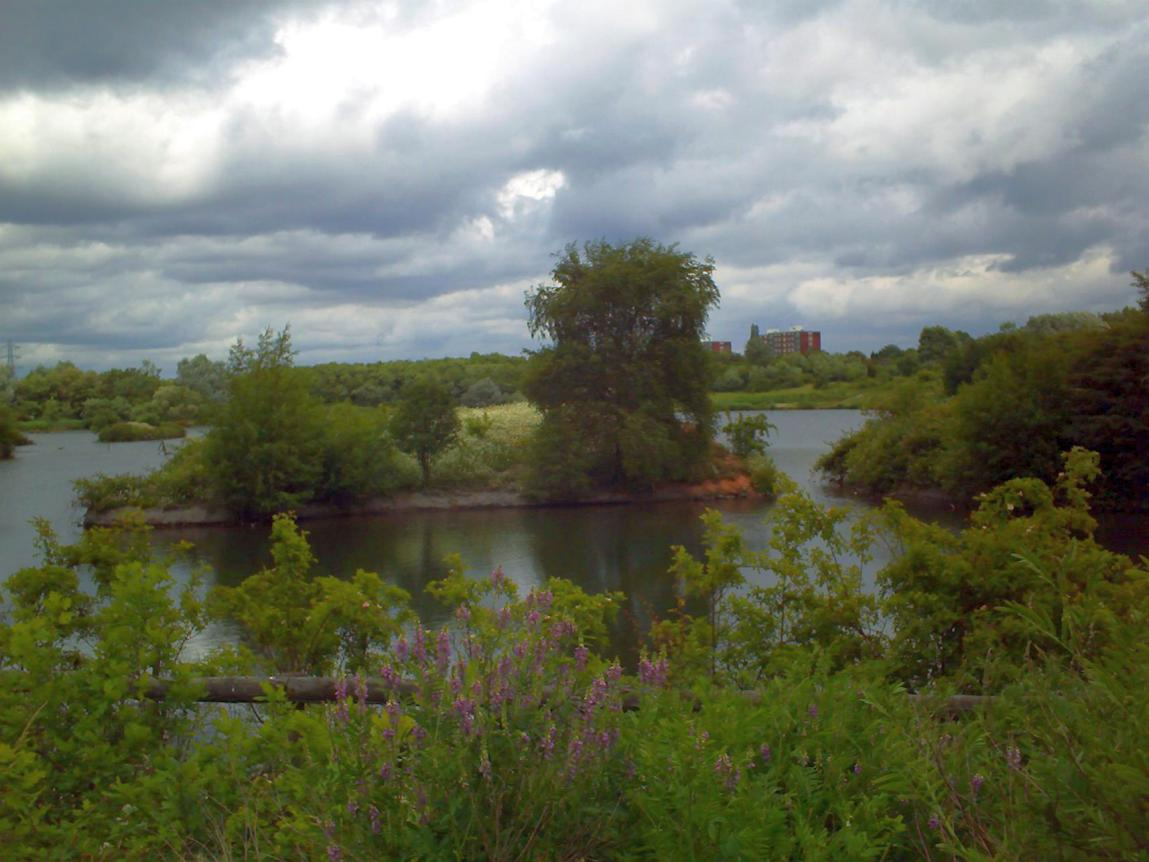
Island wildlife haven in the main lake

Sheepwash Urban Park is a Local Nature Reserve (LNR), situated in Sandwell Metropolitan Borough, in the West Midlands conurbation of the United Kingdom. It forms part of the Black Country Urban Forest.

== Location ==
The park is located to the south of Great Bridge, with main entrances at Sheepwash Lane and John's Lane, close to Dudley Port. A minor entrance is located in Philip Road. It is bounded to the south-west by the West Coast Main Line, and on other sides by housing estates.

The site was originally used for waste disposal, landfill and as a brickworks and was redeveloped in the 1980s. It extends to about 37 hectares.

== Features ==
The Oldbury Arm of the River Tame flows through the park from south to north, close to its western edge. It is flanked by a length of the River Tame Way. It feeds a number of lakes of varying sizes, which help relieve flooding along the river. These and the surrounding wetland, grassland and woods provide an important urban habitat. Some of the original brickworks buildings are still discernible around the lakes, which have islands to act as wildlife havens.

Large numbers of wild flowers, small mammals and amphibians are to be found, along with varied insect life. The council claims that 164 bird species have been recorded on the site since 1985. There is also fishing. The park is much used by Black Country schools as an environmental studies resource.

== Management ==
The park is managed by Sandwell Metropolitan Council and the BTCV.

== Gallery ==
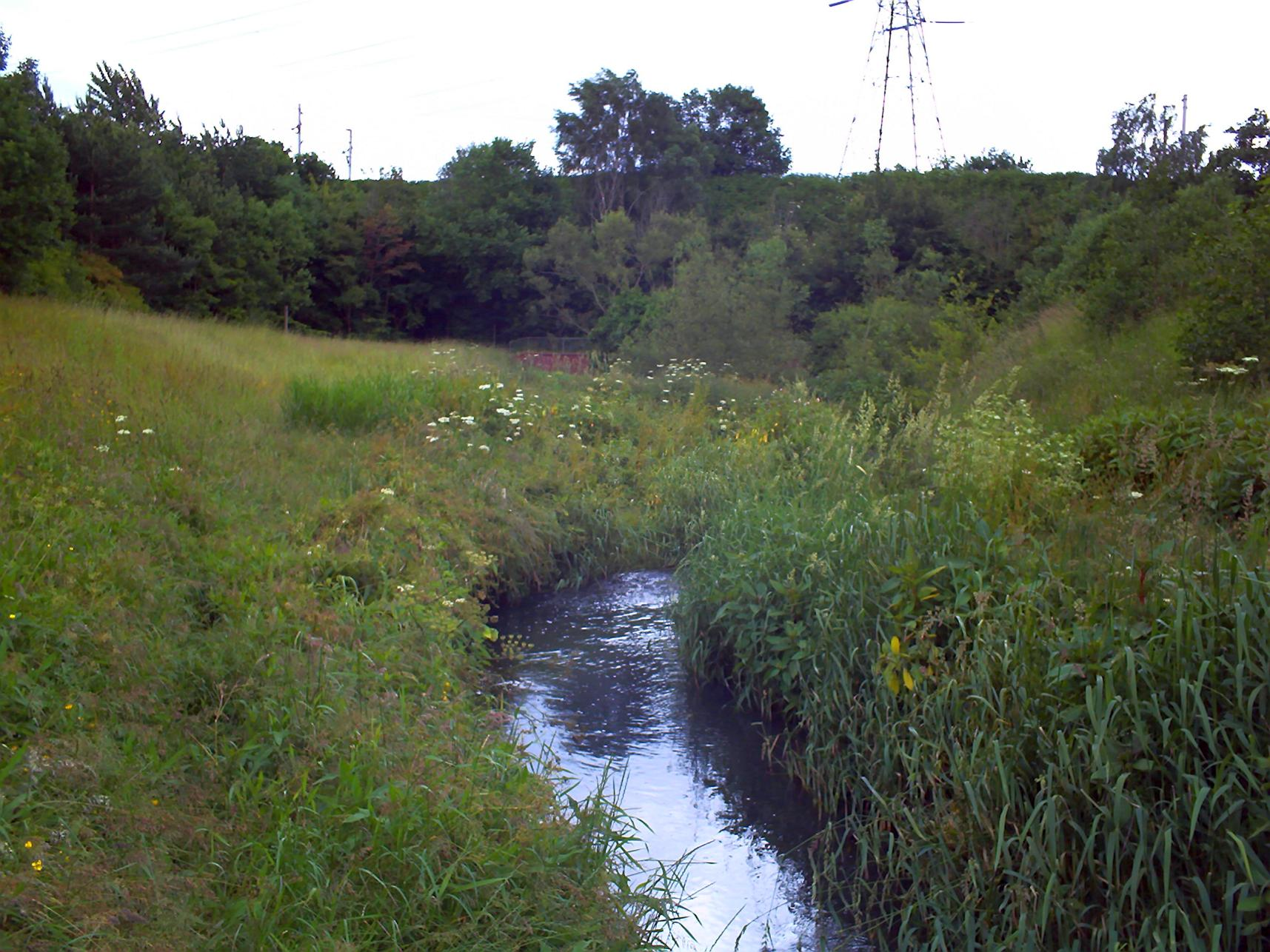
The Oldbury Arm of the Tame, close to where it enters Sheepwash, via a culvert under the West Coast Main Line.

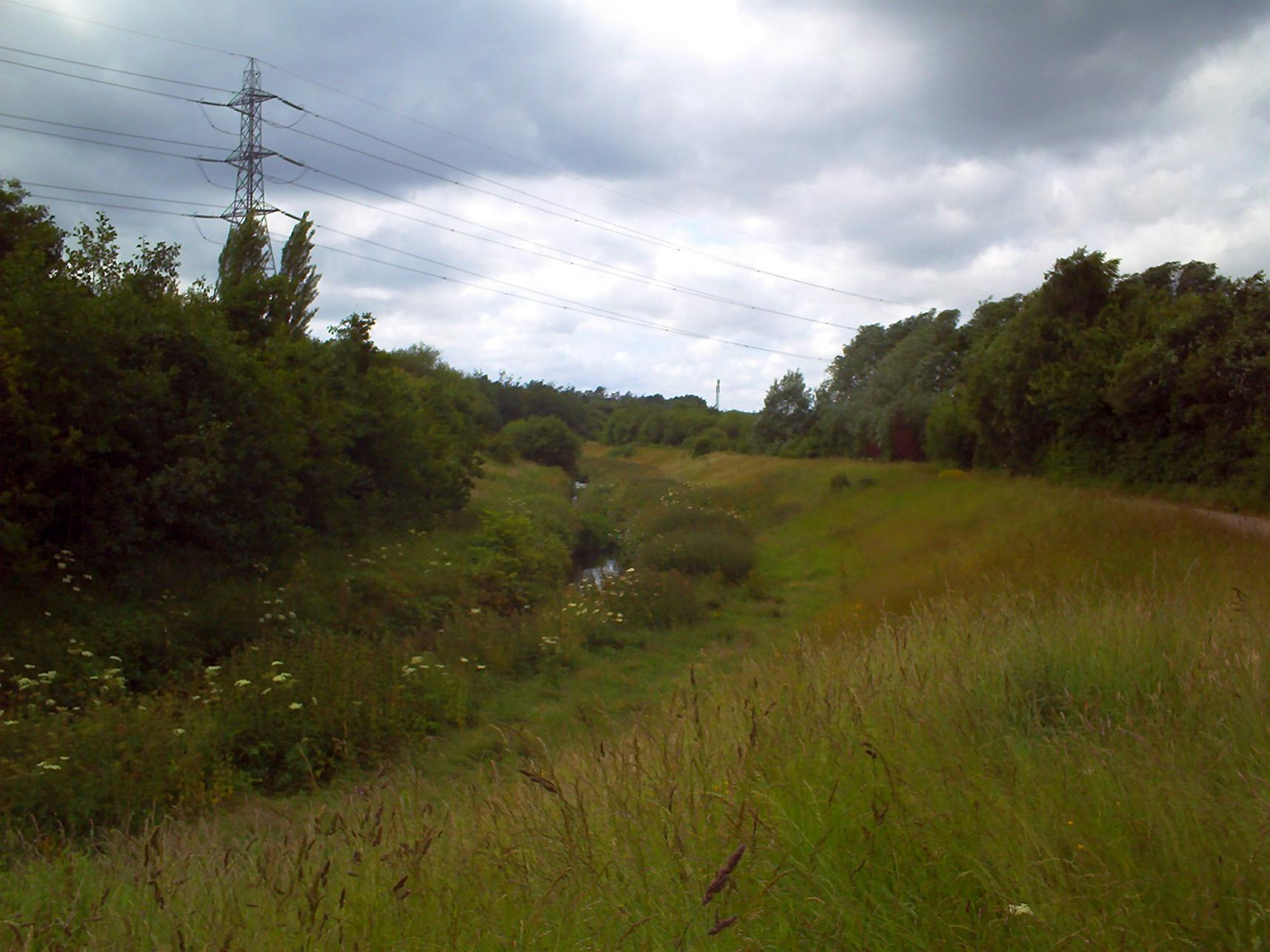
Grassland areas along the Tame embankments.

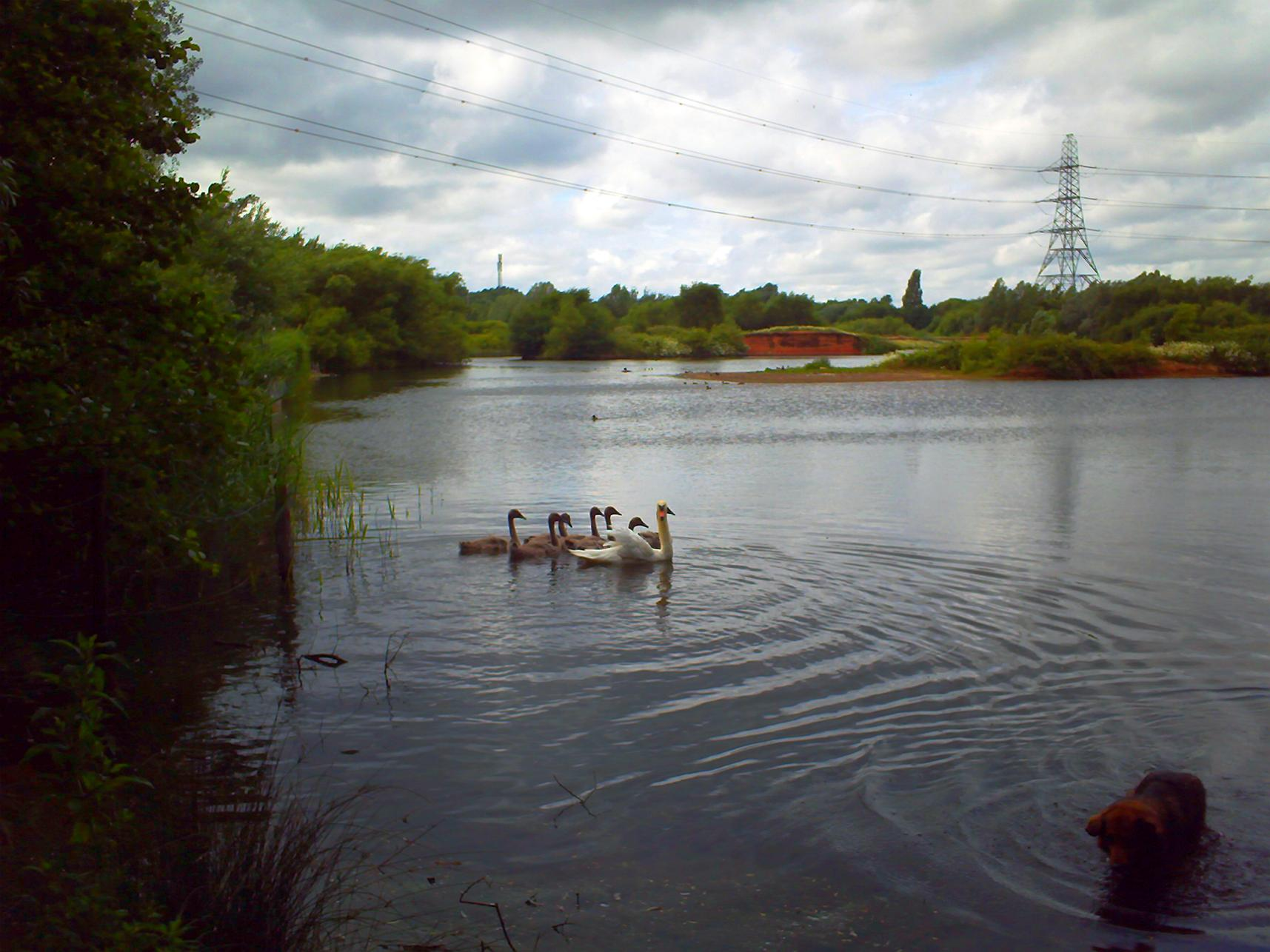
Mute swan and cygnets on the main lake at Sheepwash.

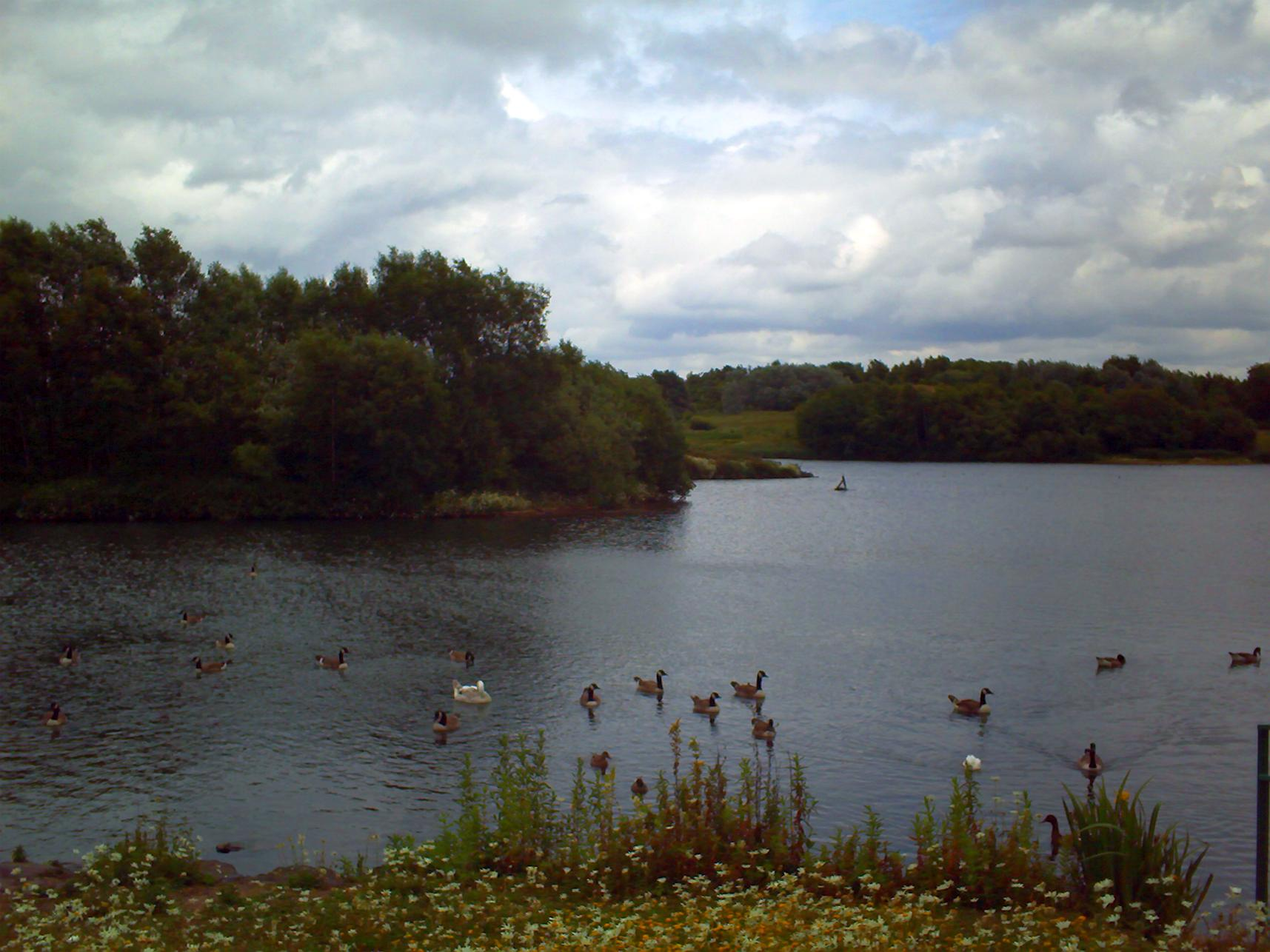
Waterfowl, including Canada geese and greylag geese. Herons are also common.
