= Tipton Green =

Area of Tipton in West Midlands, England

Coordinates: 52.525357°N 2.067176°W

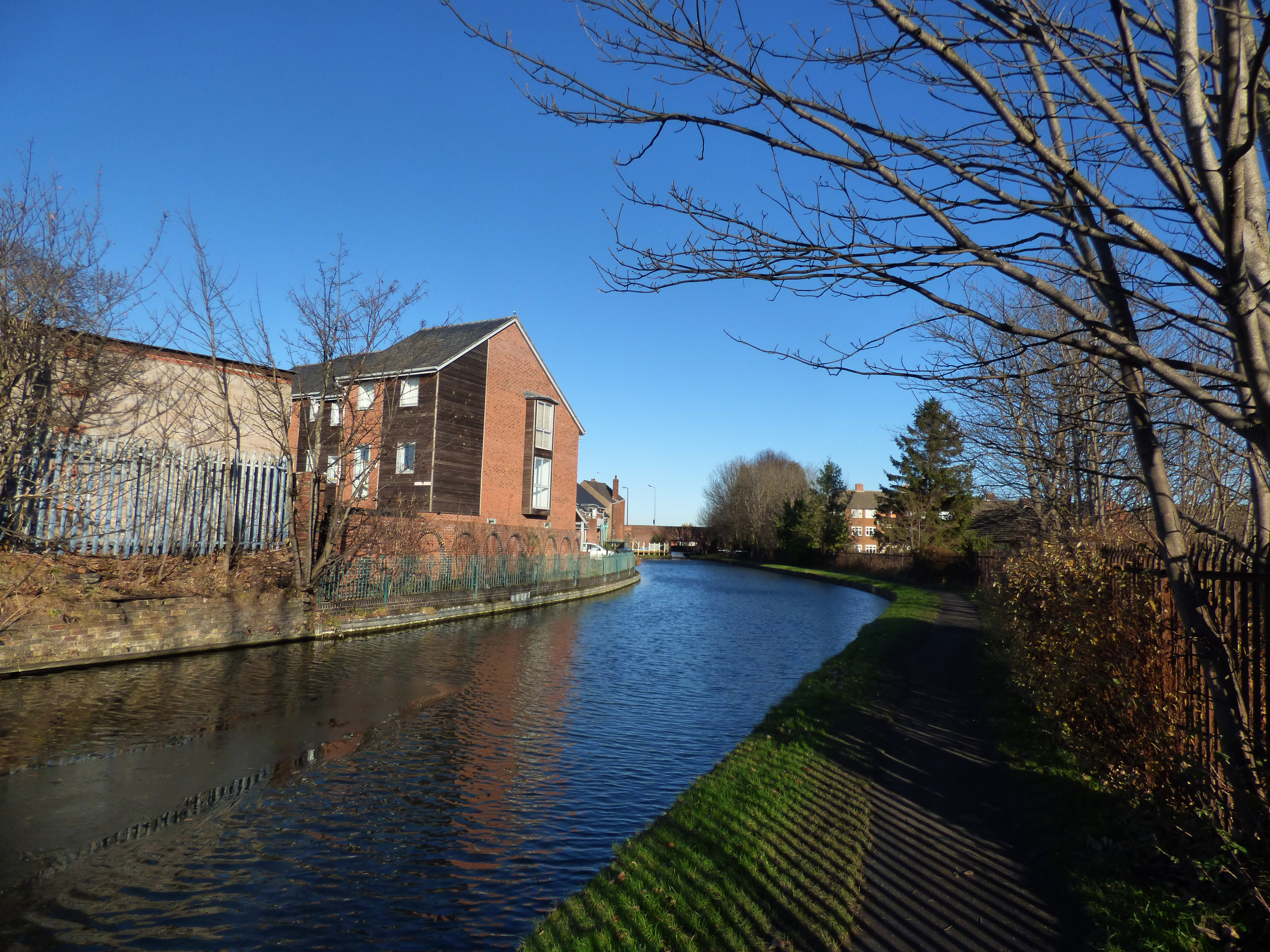
Tipton Junction to the Tipton Green Bridge

Tipton Green Village is the central area of Tipton, a town in the West Midlands of England. It was heavily developed for heavy industry and housing during the 19th century, as Tipton was one of the most significant towns during the Industrial Revolution. Tipton Green is one of three electoral wards covering Tipton for Sandwell Metropolitan Borough Council. The population of this Sandwell ward taken at the 2011 census was 12,834. It is represented by three Labour councillors.

== History ==
In June 1644, during the Civil War, Parliamentary forces attacked nearby Dudley Castle (a Royalist garrison), aided by Edward Dudley of Tipton Green Hall, which resulted in the Battle of Tipton Green. At this time, Tipton Green was still a very rural area.

With the increasing development of factories around Tipton Green in the 19th century, came hundreds of houses to provide homes for the workers. By 1843, Tipton Green had a population of approximately 8,000 people. However, virtually all of these houses had been demolished by the early 1970s to be replaced by a modern mix of private and council housing.

St Matthew's Church, the parish church of Tipton Green, was built in 1876. The church is still in use, although the original vicarage was replaced by a new building in its grounds in 1989 and the original vicarage is now a nursing home.

Tipton Baths opened at the junction of Queens Road and Manor Road in January 1933, as Tipton's first public swimming baths. These facilities were closed in the summer of 2002 due to funding difficulties with Sandwell Council, only to be re-opened within two years following extensive local campaigning and significant refurbishment to the building’s interior. The original swimming baths stayed open for nearly a decade afterwards, until being relocated to a new leisure centre in Alexandra Road in the spring of 2013, with the original building being demolished in the autumn of 2014.

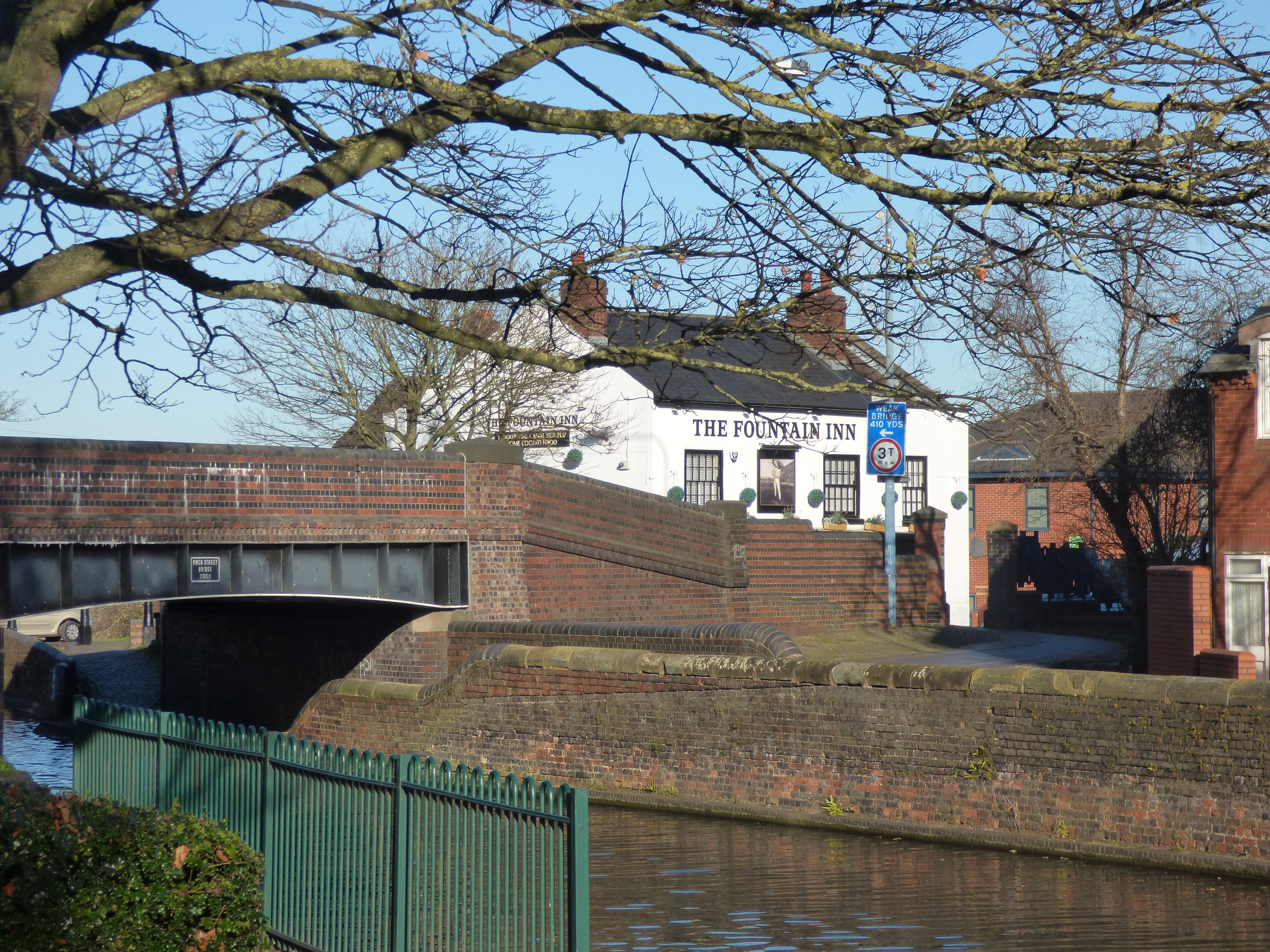
The Fountain Inn

Owen Street has been the main shopping area for Tipton Green since the 19th century, and includes the Fountain Inn, a 19th-century public house which in its early years was the headquarters of "Tipton Slasher" William Perry. By the early 1960s, however, Owen Street was falling into disrepair and Tipton Borough Council decided that redevelopment was necessary. Plans for a total redevelopment of Owen Street as well as the nearby Victorian residential area around Union Street and New Cross Street were unveiled, which would have included a pedestrianized shopping area with several blocks of multi-storey flats above some of the new shops. However, these plans were shelved when the town's council was abolished in 1966, and the area remained largely unchanged for more than a decade longer.

Sandwell MBC took control of the area in 1974, and a fresh plan for regeneration was soon unveiled. The southern side of Owen Street, along with most of Albion Street and the upper part of Union Street, were demolished in 1980 and replaced by new houses, flats, shops and a community centre. More demolition took part on the opposite side of Owen Street later in the 1980s, mostly to make way for the town's new job centre and the new Tipton & Coseley Building Society HQ which were built in the early 1990s. Further change came at the end of the decade when the community centre and early 1980s Midcounties Co-Operative supermarket were demolished within 20 years of being built to make way for new retail units and a library, which relocated from the Victoria Road building that had been in use since 1906.

Tipton Green was home to several key factories until the beginning of the 21st century. Bean Industries occupied a large site - which straddled the border with Coseley – in the area from the 1920s until the firm closed down in October 2005. The Hurst Lane section of the factory in Tipton had been closed and demolished by 2004, but the Coseley section of the site remained in use until the company's closure and was not cleared until the summer of 2008. A housing estate containing more than 200 houses and flats was built on the Tipton half of the site in 2005/06. This also incorporated some of the land previously occupied by 30 houses, an industrial unit and a butcher's shop on the corner of Sedgley Road West and Hurst Lane from about 1902 until demolition in 1994, following plans for road improvements which never materialised.

The Bean offices on Sedgley Road West, built in the early 1920s, were purchased by Tipton council in 1935 as its new headquarters and remained there until the abolition of the local authority in April 1966. Although most of Tipton was incorporated into an expanded West Bromwich borough but the area around the local authority offices, including the new Foxyards Estate, was incorporated into Dudley. The Foxyards Estate also incorporates 1930s, 1940s and 1950s houses in Foxyards Road, Hartland Road, Wrens Avenue and Woodcroft Avenue. Most of the Tividale area of the town became part of the new Warley borough which was centred on the towns of Oldbury, Smethwick and Rowley Regis.

Victoria Park was laid out on land to the east of Tipton Green in 1901, and the local area developed for housing extensively over the next ten years and again in the 1920s and 1930s, although some properties in the area have since been demolished. All houses in Binfield Street were demolished in 1976, followed soon after by the area known as the "Terraces" around Anderson Road, and all but six houses in Peel Street had been demolished by the end of the 1990s; these were mostly early 20th century terraced houses, but also included a section of 1920s council houses which were affected by subsidence. Anderson Gardens, a development of low-rise council flats, was built on the "Terraces" site around 1980, but the only development in Binfield Street was a mosque built in the late 1990s. Part of Peel Street was later redeveloped with the car park of the mosque, while new housing was developed in Peel Street from 2014.

Tipton's first council houses were built on in a group of 16 on Park Lane West in about 1925, being the town's only council houses until 1927, after which housebuilding by the local council accelerated. The largest interwar council development in Tipton Green occurred on the Shrubbery Estate in the early 1930s; nearly 200 three-bedroomed houses were built on land between Dudley Road and the embankment of the Dudley-Bilston railway line. Other similar developments took place around the same time in several roads leading off Park Lane West.

A local landmark for many years was the 19th-century Park Lane Methodist Chapel, which was known locally as the "cathedral" due to its grand size and appearance. This building was demolished in the early 1970s to be replaced by a smaller building on the same site. A street built nearby some 30 years later was named Cathedral Close in memory of this iconic building.

Nepture Health Park opened on a former factory site on Sedgley Road West in early 1999, replacing Birch Street Health Centre that had opened in 1971 as an extension to the 1950s clinic. The health centre at Birch Street became obsolete following the opening of Neptune Health Park, as did the adjacent ambulance station and care home. All of these buildings were demolished in late 2000 and the site was developed for housing.

Coronation Gardens was erected in June 1953 alongside the canal in Tipton Green, to mark the coronation of Queen Elizabeth II. Coronation House, a nine-storey block of council flats, was completed in 1959 opposite side of the road, but was demolished in 1997, being redeveloped for housing a decade later. A block of flats and shops in High Street, dating from around 1960, was also cleared in 2001. Simon Close maisonettes, built in the late 1960s, were demolished in 1995 and replaced by a new development of houses and flats by a housing association the following year.

When Tipton received borough status in 1938, a new public house in Baker Street called The Tipton Arms was built to commemorate this new status, opening in November 1939. However, this was closed and demolished at the end of 1994 and the site is now occupied by housing. The new private housing development on the site was named Tipps Stone Close, in honour of the stones which appeared on the former borough of Tipton’s coat of arms.

== Places of interest ==
Tipton Green's main shopping area has always been Owen Street, which was a busy and popular shopping area for approximately 100 years leading up to the late 1960s, when many of its key retailers were relocated or liquidated. The area was almost completely redeveloped in the late 1970s, with the historic "Fountain Inn" public house being one of the few old buildings to survive. This is now a listed building due to its association with the Tipton Slasher William Perry (a 19th-century boxer), although its top storey was removed in the 1950s and it is now a two-storey building.

The parish church for Tipton Green is St Matthew's. It was opened in 1876 and the original church survives to this day. The vicarage is also intact, but it is now a nursing home as a new vicarage was opened in the original vicarage's garden in 1989. The church was designed by J. H. Gibbons and consists of English bond brickwork with a tiled roof. It received Grade II listed status on 29 September 1987.

Victoria Park is the largest open space in the ward, covering an area of 13.78 hectares (34 acres). It hosts a 19th-century wedding arbour and is now a Grade II listed park.

== Transport ==
Tipton Green has been home to the town's railway station since the mid 19th century, giving it direct passenger train links with Birmingham and Wolverhampton. There was a second station in the area at Five Ways (on the border with Coseley between 1850 and 1962, but this station was one of the first victims of the Beeching Axe and the line upon which it was situated (between Dudley and Bilston) closed in 1968.

The section of old railway between Sedgley Road West and Birmingham New Road was redeveloped for housing in 2002. The new development was constructed by Kendrick Homes Ltd and is known as Fox's Hollow.

Old Main Line Canal passes through Tipton Green. At the Tipton Green Locks, the first house constructed out of iron was assembled prior to 1830. The house was moved in 1876 to a new location at the locks and was eventually demolished in 1926, apparently in the same condition it was in when first constructed.

== Education ==
The local infant school is Silvertrees Academy, opened on Silvertrees Road in 1995 to replace a 60-year-old building in Manor Road.

Tipton Green Junior School is the adjacent junior school which was opened in 1976 to replace the original school, which opened in 1880, on Sedgley Road West. The school underwent a major modernisation in 1994. Whilst the external appearance remained the same, the interior was completely redesigned. Classrooms were enlarged to average 55.4 square metres (596 sq ft). The library was refitted to become the visual heart of the school whilst a new entrance was added to the building. However, a complete rebuild on the junior school began in April 2010 and the old school closed in July 2011, with pupils set to move into the new buildings in September. Both schools are covered by the Sandwell Local Education Authority.

Park Lane Secondary School was opened in 1904 on the site now occupied by Victoria Infant School. It merged with Tipton Grammar School in 1969 to become Alexandra High School - now known as Q3 Academy Tipton, but the Park Lane buildings remained in use as the Alexandra lower school until 1990. The building was demolished shortly afterwards.

== Unemployment ==
In July 2008, as the British economy was sliding into recession, it was reported that 9.6% of Tipton Green's residents were unemployed - well above the national average of 5.8% but not as high as the 10.9% rate in neighbouring Princes End. Unemployment in Tipton Green went up to over 10% over the next two years as the recession deepened.
