= Bill Turner (English footballer, born 1901) =

English footballer

Personal information
- Full name: William Turner
- Date of birth: 16 November 1901
- Place of birth: Tipton, England
- Date of death: 1989 (aged 87–88)
- Position: Midfielder

Youth career
- ?: Bromsgrove Rovers

Senior career*
Years	Team	Apps	(Gls)
?–1925	Bromsgrove Rovers	?	(?)
1925–1936	Crystal Palace	281	(36)
1936–?	Worcester City	?	(?)

International career
?	England schoolboys	?	(?)
- * Club domestic league appearances and goals

William Turner (16 November 1901 – 1989) was an English, retired professional footballer who played mainly as a midfielder or inside forward. He made 281 League appearances for Crystal Palace scoring 36 goals. He also played non-league football for Bromsgrove Rovers and Worcester City F.C.

== Playing career ==
Turner began his career with Bromsgrove Rovers but had already become an England schoolboy international before signing for the club. He signed for Crystal Palace on 4 May 1925 and became a regular in the side the following season. Over the next 11 seasons, Turner made 281 league appearances for Palace, scoring 36 goals and became noted for his committed performances and versatility, playing in eight different positions. His nickname amongst the club's supporters was "Rubber". In June 1936, Turner moved back into non-league football when he signed for Worcester City where he finished his playing career.

Bill Turner died in 1989 aged 87 or 88.
