= Edward Harwood (of Darwen) =

English composer of hymns, anthems and songs

- Born: 1707; Hoddlesden, Lancashire
- Died: 1787 (aged 79–80)
- Occupations: Composer of hymns, anthems and songs

Edward Harwood (of Darwen) (1707–1787) was an English composer of hymns, anthems and songs. His setting of Alexander Pope's revolutionary The Dying Christian (Vital spark of heav'nly flame) was enormously popular at one time and was widely performed at funerals of nobility and commoners alike.

== Biography ==
Edward Harwood was born at Hoddlesden, near Darwen, Lancashire, in 1707. His early training was as a hand-loom weaver, but he subsequently became a professional musician in Liverpool.^{1} His first collection of psalmody, A set of hymns and psalm tunes, was published in London in 1781,^{2} and a second collection, entitled A Second Set of Hymns and Psalm Tunes was published at Chester in 1786.^{3} Both collections were widely well-received. He died a year after publishing his second collection, in 1787.^{4}

== Vital Spark ==
Harwood's setting of Pope's ode Vital spark of heav'nly flame was first published in Harwood's A set of hymns and psalm tunes: it is written in the style of a glee^{5}, and in the original publication is written for the most part for three voices (two trebles and bass), with a fourth (tenor) part being added for the last few bars only. It was, however, often arranged for the more usual four part-choir.^{6} The piece was extremely popular in the first half of the 19th century, being widely sung among Anglicans, Methodists and dissenters^{7}, and Lightwood noted in 1935 that it 'certainly had a long and prosperous run, and even now it is not quite extinct'.^{8} However, it was not always a great favourite with the clergy, whose objections were mainly to do with the text, which is not explicitly religious (also, it's a poem written by a Catholic, after the last words of the Emperor Hadrian).

== Notes ==
^1p343, Lightwood, 1935
^2Hymn Tune Index, source code HarwES1
^3Hymn Tune Index, source code HarwES2
^4p343, Lightwood, 1935
^5p214, Temperley, 1979
^6p214, Temperley, 1979
^7p214, Temperley, 1979
^8p343, Lightwood, 1935
