= The Elite Church =

- Church of St Martin and St Paul
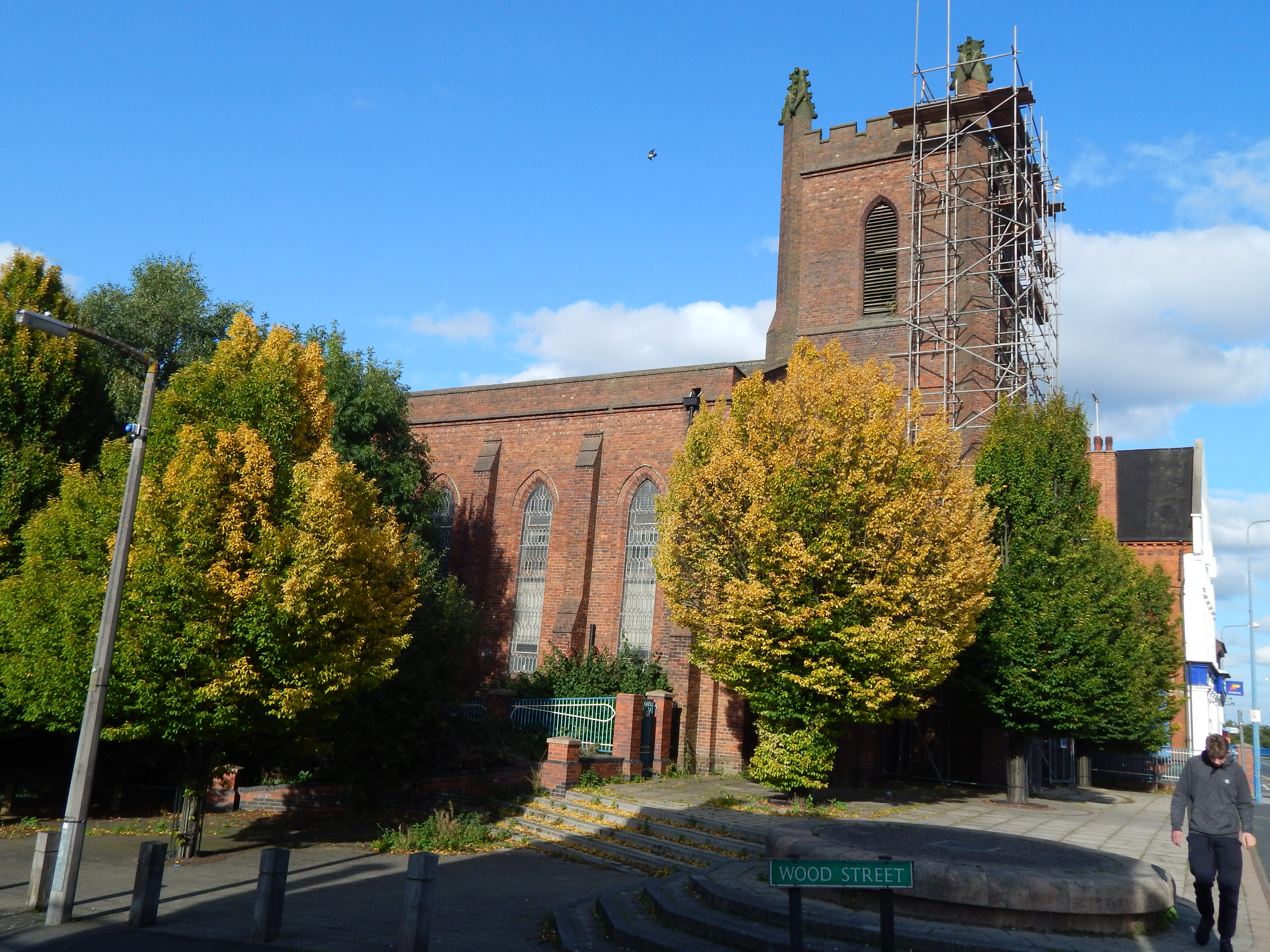
- The Elite Church
- 52°31′47.53″N 2°04′03.16″W
- OS grid reference: SO 95515 92447
- Location: Owen Street, Tipton, West Midlands
- Country: England
- Previous denomination: Church of England
- Website: www.theelitechurch.org

Architecture
- Heritage designation: Grade II
- Designated: 1 December 2015

The Elite Church, formerly the Church of St Martin and St Paul, is a church in Tipton, West Midlands, England.

The church, built in 1837, is Grade II listed.

== History ==
The church was built in 1837, during a time when the town was rapidly expanding. The architect was Robert Ebbles; its style is described in the listing text as Commissioners' Gothic. It was originally dedicated to St Paul, and was initially a chapel of ease for St Martin's Church in Lower Church Lane. The parish of St Paul was created for the church in 1843. St Martin's closed in 1986 (later converted for residential use) and the parishes of St Martin and St Paul merged.

It was reported in 2018 that the Church of St Martin and St Paul, in the Diocese of Lichfield of the Church of England, would close, and the congregation would be moved to St Matthew's Church in Tipton.

The building was purchased in November 2021 by The Elite Church, a registered charity. It is the charity's first permanent place of worship. Its original name was the CAC Royal Priesthood Centre; the change of name in June 2022 "serves as a symbol of our dedication to sharing the gospel, practising unconditional love, and upholding our values."

== Description ==
It is built of red brick with stone dressings. Unusually, the building is aligned north-west to south-east, because of the shape of the available land. There is no burial ground. The tower, with a central doorway, is at the south-east; it has battlements, with crocketed finials at the corners. The nave has lancet windows, which externally have buttresses between them. Inside, the chancel is at the north-western end. There is a shallow chancel bay where there is a four-light window with tracery at the top. There is a stone Gothic font, given by a parishioner in 1870. In 1985 a false ceiling was fitted above the nave, to reduce the cost of heating, and two parish rooms were created to the rear of the nave.
