= Joseph John Davies =

British Victoria Cross recipient (1889–1976)

Joseph John Davies VC
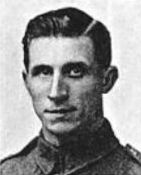
- Born: 28 April 1889; Tipton, Staffordshire, England
- Died: 16 February 1976 (aged 86); Bournemouth, Dorset, England
- Military career
- Allegiance: United Kingdom
- Branch: British Army
- Rank: Staff-Sergeant
- Units: Royal Welch Fusiliers; Herefordshire Regiment
- Conflicts: First World War
- Awards: Victoria Cross; Order of St. George (Russia)

Staff-Sergeant Joseph John Davies VC (28 April 1889 − 16 February 1976) was a British Army soldier and a British recipient of the Victoria Cross (VC), the highest and most prestigious award for gallantry in the face of the enemy that can be awarded to British and Commonwealth forces.

== Biography ==
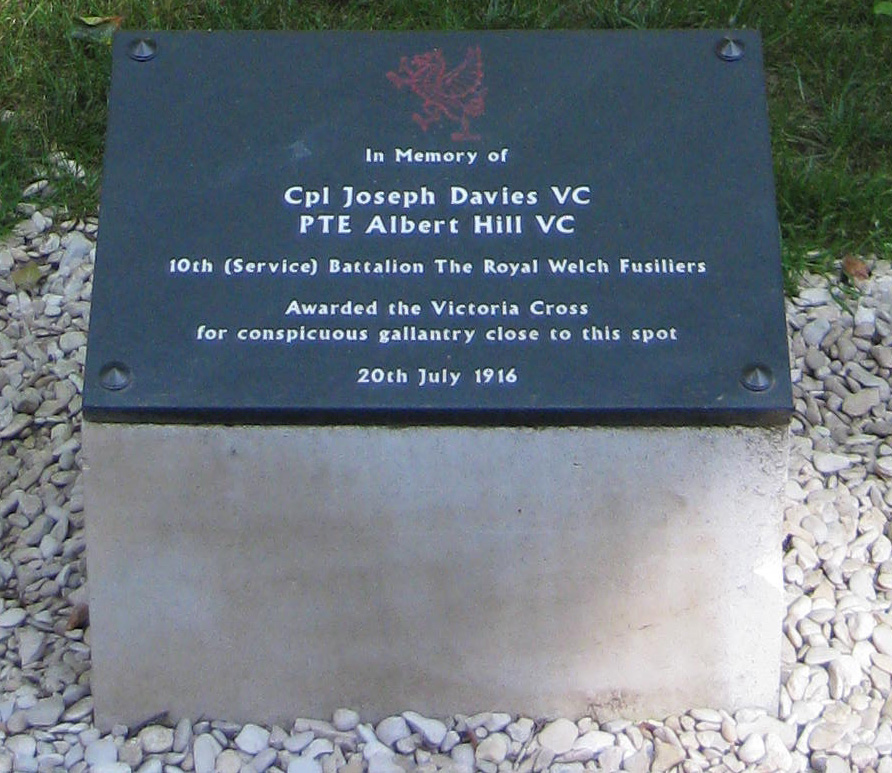
Memorial to Joseph Davies, Delville Wood

Joseph John Davies was born in Tipton on 28 April 1889.

He was 27 years old, and a corporal in the 10th Battalion, Royal Welsh Fusiliers, British Army during the First World War when the following deed took place for which he was awarded the VC.

On 20 July 1916 at Delville Wood, France, prior to an attack on the enemy, Corporal Davies and eight men became separated from the rest of the company. When the enemy delivered their second counterattack, the party was completely surrounded, but Corporal Davies got his men into a shell hole and by throwing bombs and opening rapid fire he succeeded in routing the attackers, and even followed and bayoneted them in their retreat.

He later achieved the rank of staff-sergeant. After demobilisation from the Regular Army he joined the 1st Battalion, The Herefordshire Regiment, Territorial Army (TA) regiment, until the mid 1920s.

He died on 16 February 1976.

His VC is displayed at the Royal Welch Fusiliers Museum in Caernarfon Castle, Gwynedd, Wales.

== Bibliography ==
- Gliddon, Gerald (2011) [1991]. Somme 1916. VCs of the First World War. The History Press. ISBN 978-0-7524-6303-2.
