= Joseph Williams (composer) =

English coal-miner and composer (c. 1800–1834)

Joseph Williams (c. 1800–1834) was an English coal miner and composer of sacred music, known today as West gallery music. Very little is known about his life, other than he lived in Watery Lane, Tipton, Staffordshire. During his short lifetime he published a collection of his compositions, Sacred Music (Tipton: for the Author, c. 1830), containing 20 hymn tunes.

He met an unfortunate death in a mining-related accident on the Himley Road, Dudley, on 14 April 1834. He was walking along the road near to a mine pit, and an explosion taking place threw a large rock into the air which killed him instantly. The pit's owners, Messrs. Horton, were not penalised for the accident.

A second collection of his music, The Celestial Chorister (London: Joseph Hart, c. 1835), was published posthumously, as the title page states, to raise money for his widow and 6 children. The collection is unusual in that 12 of the hymns take their titles from the 12 signs of the Zodiac.
