= Samuel Cook (Chartist) =

English politician (1786 – 1861)

- Born: 15 July 1786; Trowbridge, Wiltshire, England
- Died: 9 August 1861 (aged 75)
- Resting place: Independent Chapel, Dudley
- Occupation: Draper
- Known for: Radical political agitation

Samuel Cook (15 July 1786 – 9 August 1861) lived in Dudley in the 19th century, where he promoted Radical political causes. He agitated for political reform, displaying political posters in the windows of his draper's shop. He became Chairman of the Dudley Political Union, which advocated parliamentary reform, and had a leading role in the Dudley Chartist movement. His political agitation resulted in him being put on trial on many occasions.

== Life ==
Samuel Cook was born on 15 July 1786 in Trowbridge. He was the son of Samuel and Amy Cook, his father being a cloth maker. Cook served an apprenticeship with a draper at Poole. He married Maria Jones in 1810. He commenced business in Liverpool. His first recorded political speech was in 1815 when he addressed a crowd outside his house on the occasion of the ending of the Napoleonic War. In 1819 he moved to Dudley where he set up a draper's shop on the High Street. The shop was situated at 77 and 78 High Street and was known as "Gibraltar House". He became active in Radical politics, agitating for parliamentary reform via the Dudley Political Union. One of his methods of political agitation was to display posters in the window of his shop.

In 1823, Cook started a campaign against the Anglican Church authorities and against Church Rates when he published two posters.

In 1826 he was arrested after he displayed a poster publicising a nailers' strike. A further poster describing his arrest was then exposed. Cook was then summoned to the Town Hall on accused of publishing a seditious libel, resulting in him being tried at the Worcester Assizes on 1 August 1827 before Mr. Justice Littledale. He was defended by John Campbell (later the MP for Dudley and holder of several government posts including Attorney General) and was found guilty. However, his punishment was light, being bound over for the sum £200 to receive sentence "when called upon".

Samuel's wife, Maria, died on 7 September 1827.

In the early 1830s, campaigning organisations known as Political Unions began to form in a number of Black Country towns. Samuel Cook often chaired the regular meeting of the Dudley Political Union. In October 1833 he attended a meeting in Oldbury at which colliers demanded a reduction in daily working hours. As the speeches excited the crowd and the numbers attending increased, the magistrates ordered that the meeting was illegal and called out troops in order to keep the peace.

Cook published "Some of the Principles of Dudley Radicalism" in 1834 in which, amongst other demands, he called for universal suffrage, vote by ballot, universal education, an end to Church Rates, a free press and marriages to be a civil ceremony.

In 1836 Cook issued a poster calling on Thomas Badger, a Dudley magistrate, to step down following a conviction for assault. However, the verdict was overturned on appeal and Cook was charged and found guilty of publishing a libel.

In 1837, Cook had goods seized from his shop due to non-payment of Church Rates. He had 3 pairs of blankets confiscated, valued at £2 5s although he only owed 17s 11d.

The Chartist leader Henry Vincent was invited to a meeting in Dudley in August 1838. Vincent gave an address followed by Cook and it was decided to re-organise the Dudley Political Union along Chartist lines.

During 1839, Chartists were active both nationally and in the Midlands area, particularly at Birmingham where a riot took place on 15 July as police were brought in from London to stop meetings at the Bull Ring. On the 16 July, a meeting took place outside the Founders' Arms tavern in Dudley where Cook was present and Smith Lyndon, the main speaker, was alleged to have referred to the police as "blue devils" and "blood-thirsty villains". Both Cook and Lyndon were arrested and Cook was charged with incitement to break the peace. Put on trial on 18 October 1839 at Worcester, Cook was found guilty and sentenced to 6 months imprisonment.

Cook was not deterred from his political activity, however, and in January 1841, the Dudley National Charter Association was created with Cook as treasurer of the organization. In March 1842, the Chartist Leader, Feargus O'Connor attended the South Staffordshire Chartist rally. Cook was part of the reception party that met him at Wolverhampton. A large procession formed with the Dudley contingent marching 10 abreast holding a banner stating "Behold the Conquering Hero Comes" and a flag bearing the motto "More Pigs and Less Parsons".

In May 1842, nailmakers in Dudley went on strike, as an economic downturn that had started in 1839 began to bite. From July of the same year, a series of strikes and riots broke out across the Black Country and around the Midlands. Samuel Cook was one of many activists arrested during the protest. In Cook's case, a poster displayed in his shop in August 1842, advertising a demonstration to be held in Birmingham, led to his arrest and imprisonment pending the Worcester Assizes. According to a contemporary newspaper report: he was "escorted by a division of yeomanry on his journey to Worcester". However, when the case came to trial at Worcester in October 1842, the prosecution decided not to pursue the case, leading to Cook being acquitted.

In December 1843, Cook was declared bankrupt. In a hearing in the Birmingham Bankruptcy Court held on 6 February 1844, it was stated that debts owing were £2,195 18s 11d; whereas assets, and good debts were £60 15s 10d; and Cook's property was valued at £548 3s. During the hearing, a solicitor, Mr. Wainwright, listed some of Cook's arrests and court appearances, leading to the following exchange:

Mr Motteram — The bankrupt has been a "martyr."

His Honour — The bankrupt's creditors are martyrs.

In 1847, Cook attempted to intervene in the election of the MP for Dudley, nominating a fellow Chartist, Joseph Linney, to oppose the sitting Tory MP, John Benbow. According to a local chronicler: "Mr. Joseph Linney was elected by the show of hands, by a large majority; the usual poll was demanded, and the day and time fixed upon, but, alas! for human greatness, poor Mr. Linney could not find the necessary guarantee (funds) for his election expenses, and his friends and admirers were in the same plight, so before the polling commenced, it oozed out that Mr. Linney had retired from the contest, leaving the old member master of the field. Thus, Mr. Benbow was again returned the member for the Castle interest in another Parliament." The following day, a similar attempt was made at the election in Wolverhampton but this time Linney was proposer and Cook the candidate. As at Dudley, the attempt failed as the Chartists did not put up the election expenses, but Linney succeeded in making a speech before the crowd.

In April 1855, Cook accompanied a delegation of colliers to meet a group of coal and ironmasters on the occasion of a colliers' strike.

In December 1856 there were meetings against the Income Tax in the Black Country. At Dudley, where the mayor chaired the meeting, Cook seconded the motion proposing the abolition of the tax. Cook took the opportunity to call for an elected mayor (at this time the mayor was an official of the Court Leet of the Lord of the Manor) and a Municipal corporation for Dudley.

Cook maintained his political activities until the end of his life. On 26 October 1860 he attended the meeting of the Court Leet of the Lord of the Manor of Dudley where he gave "his customary annual protest against the illegal appointment of a Mayor of Dudley" by that body.

Shortly before his death, Cook was in correspondence with Giuseppe Garibaldi.

Samuel died on 9 August 1861 and was buried at the Independent Chapel on King Street, Dudley. His drapers' business was passed on to his son Samuel Quartus Cook and stayed in the family in expanded premises on Dudley Upper High Street until 1983.
