= Great Bridge, West Midlands =

District of Tipton, West Midlands, England

Coordinates: 52.5304°N 2.0353°W

Great Bridge
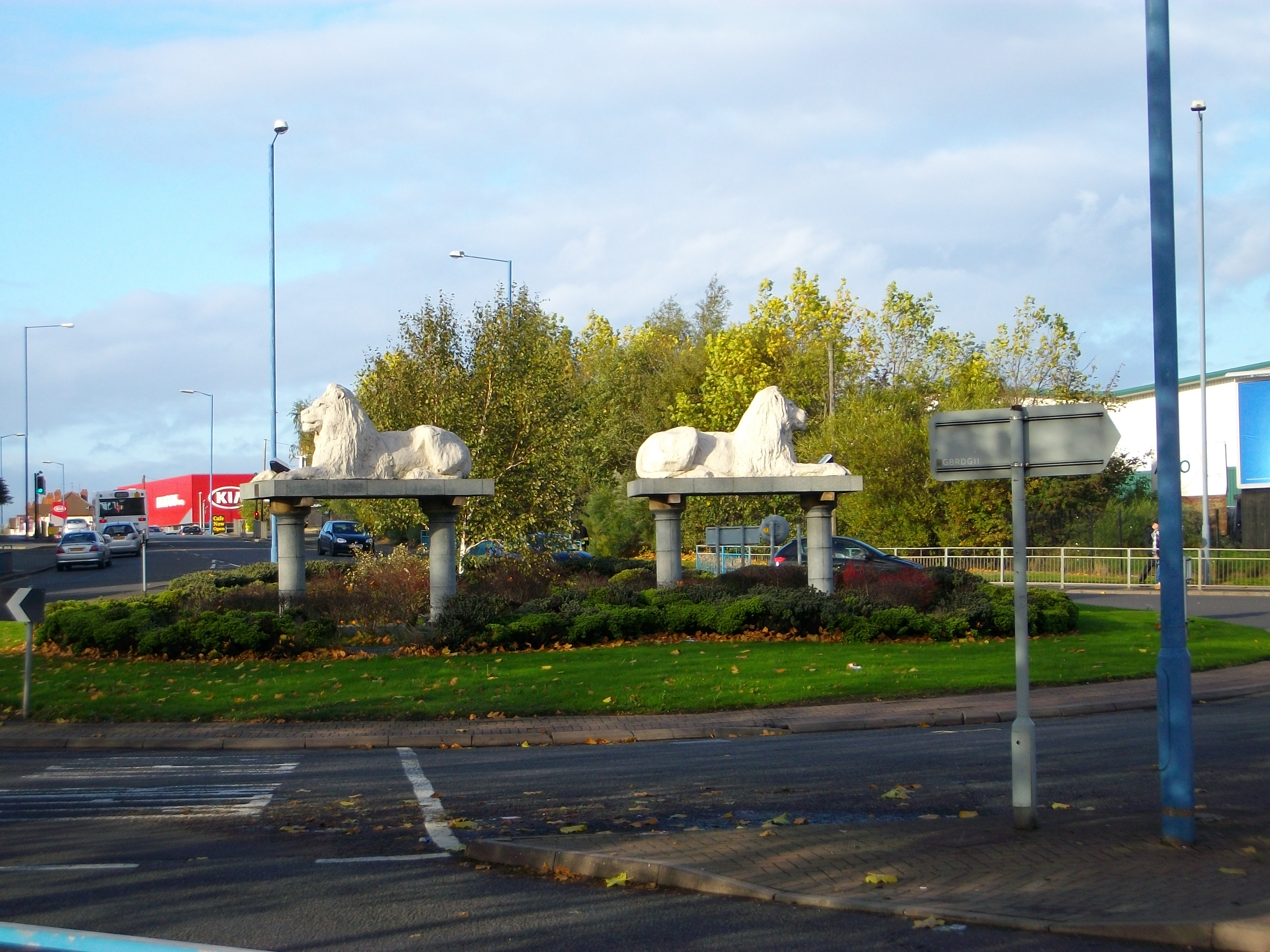
- Great Bridge roundabout with lions

- Location within the West Midlands
- Population: 12,962 (2011)
- OS grid reference: SO976925
- Metropolitan borough: Sandwell
- Metropolitan county: West Midlands
- Region: West Midlands
- Country: England
- Sovereign state: United Kingdom
- Post town: TIPTON
- Postcode district: DY4
- Dialling code: 0121
- Police: West Midlands
- Fire: West Midlands
- Ambulance: West Midlands
- UK Parliament: Tipton and Wednesbury

Great Bridge is a historic village and district of Tipton in the Metropolitan Borough of Sandwell in the metropolitan county of the West Midlands, England. It is situated near the towns of Dudley, West Bromwich and Wednesbury.

== Origins and history ==
The place name Great Bridge comes from Old English 'grēot' (grit or gravelly - meaning a stream with a gravelly bed), with the later addition of 'Bridge' - when a bridge was first built over the stream. There are several watercourses in England with the name 'Greet', all from this origin. The stream is thought to be the Oldbury arm of the River Tame, known to the early English in this area as 'grēot' (Greets Green takes its name from the same watercourse).

Great Bridge has had a marketplace for several centuries. Until 2020 it had both an outdoor and an indoor market; the latter was permanently closed because of the effects of the COVID-19 pandemic.

In the early hours of 17 May 1941, an air raid by the German Luftwaffe destroyed the Tipton Tavern house on the corner of New Road and Horseley Road, killing six people: two brothers aged three and seven, a 36-year-old male air raid warden, a middle-aged married couple and a 42-year-old woman. New Road Methodist Church was also destroyed in the same attack and a number of nearby houses were damaged.

For most of the 20th century Great Bridge was the home of numerous factories (including an ice cream factory opened by Italian immigrant Giuseppe Bonaccorsi) and foundries. However, by the end of the 1990s most of the factories had long since been closed and been demolished. These include Ratcliff's on Eagle Lane, which closed in 1989, and John Thompson's on Horseley Road, which closed in 1991. Since the early 1990s many new housing developments have sprung up, mostly on the sites of factories. Two lion statues from the entrance of the former Roman Mosaic ceramics factory were moved to the roundabout in the centre of Great Bridge in 2002 to mark the Golden Jubilee of Queen Elizabeth II, and subsequently gifted to the borough.

A 24-hour two-storey Asda superstore opened in May 1998 on a factory site. A smaller supermarket in the old village was opened in December 1986 and occupied by Kwik Save until the retailer went into liquidation in 2007. Wilko took the building over in May 2008.

== Recreation ==
Sheepwash Urban Park, a Local Nature Reserve, lies within the Great Bridge area. It is a local beauty spot where fishing can be carried out and wild birds such as herons, ducks, swans and Canada geese can be seen. It is encircled by a path used by both cyclists and walkers.

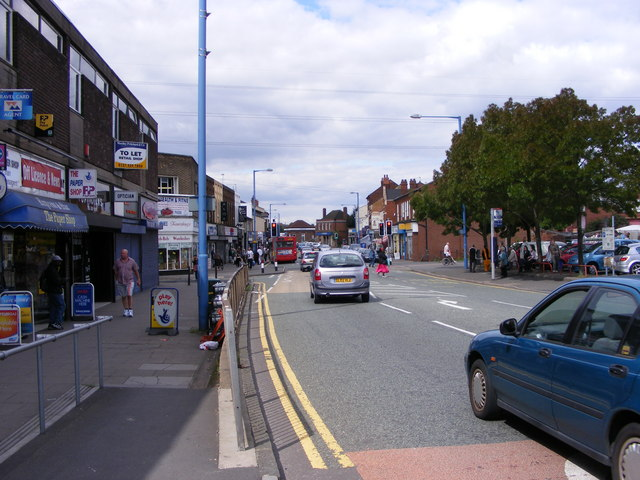
Street scene

== Transport ==
There were two railway stations (Great Bridge North Railway Station and Great Bridge South railway station) in the Great Bridge area, but both stations were closed in the 1960s due to the Beeching Axe. Great Bridge South Station was situated on the line between Great Bridge and West Bromwich, which was dismantled during the 1970s. Great Bridge North Station was situated on the South Staffordshire Line between Walsall and Stourbridge, which closed to passengers in the 1960s but remained open for goods trains until the Walsall - Round Oak section was closed in 1993. It is set to re-open during the mid-late 2020s as an extension to the Midland Metro.

Great Bridge has direct bus links with Tipton, Dudley, West Bromwich, Bilston, Wednesbury and Birmingham on bus services 30, 42, 43, 74 and 74A operated by National Express West Midlands and Diamond.

Since 1995, Great Bridge has been served by the Black Country Spine Road, which gives a quick dual carriageway route to Bilston and Wednesbury in one direction and West Bromwich as well as the M5 motorway in the other. This opened up several square miles of previously inaccessible land for industrial and commercial use, bringing jobs to Great Bridge in the aftermath of the 1970s and 1980s de-industrialisation.

The Walsall Canal and River Tame both pass through the eastern side of Great Bridge. A pedestrian footpath crossing them links the town centre to the Asda site.

== See also ==
- Sandwell
- West Midlands
