= Joe Mayo =

English footballer

Personal information
- Full name: Joseph Mayo
- Date of birth: 25 May 1952
- Place of birth: Tipton, England
- Position: Forward

Senior career*
Years	Team	Apps	(Gls)
1972–1973	Walsall	7	(1)
1973–1977	West Bromwich Albion	72	(16)
1977–1981	Orient	155	(36)
1981–1982	Cambridge United	36	(16)
1982	→ Blackpool (loan)	5	(1)
- * Club domestic league appearances and goals

Joseph Mayo (born 25 May 1952) is an English former professional footballer who played as a striker. He began his career with Walsall but struggled to break into the first team, joining West Bromwich Albion where he won promotion to the First Division in 1976. He later played for Orient, Cambridge United and Blackpool.

== Career ==
Mayo grew up in Tipton and attended the town's grammar school, but never played football at school and only took up playing as a teenager when he began playing local amateur football. He was spotted by Ken Hodgkisson who signed him for non-league side Dudley Town. However, Mayo "never really thought about" becoming a professional footballer and had begun working as a trainee accountant at Brookhouse Steel where he made copies of ledgers.

While at Dudley, Mayo had an unsuccessful trial with Oxford United before being offered a trial with Walsall. He appeared for the club's reserve side in the Midland Intermediate League before being offered a professional contract in September 1972, at which time he left his accounting job. He made his professional debut for Walsall and appeared in seven league matches for the club but spent the majority of his time in the reserve side. During a reserve match against West Bromwich Albion, the club he supported, Mayo scored a hat-trick which convinced West Brom manager Don Howe to sign Mayo for £17,000 in February 1973. He made his debut for the club in September 1973 as a substitute during a match against Hull City. He made over 90 appearances in all competitions for West Brom, helping the club achieve promotion to the First Division in the 1975–76 season.

In March 1977, he joined Orient along with Allan Glover in a transfer deal that saw Laurie Cunningham move in the opposite direction. A year later, he was part of the Orient side that reached the semi-final of the FA Cup before losing to Arsenal. He joined Cambridge United in September 1981 for a fee of £100,000 where he finished his professional career in 1983.

== Personal life ==
Following his retirement from football, Mayo moved to North Wales and took ownership of the Plas Isa Hotel in Criccieth. He later worked in the tobacco industry. In 2015, Mayo appeared on series twelve of the reality television game show, Coach Trip, being named winner in the final. In 2017, he appeared on the ITV quiz show, The Chase, and made it through to the Final Chase, but he and his remaining teammate were caught by chaser Jenny Ryan with one second remaining. He appeared in the BBC game show Letterbox in 2018 where he and his friend Nikki lost in the semi-final.
