= Sandwell =

Borough of Sandwell
- Metropolitan borough
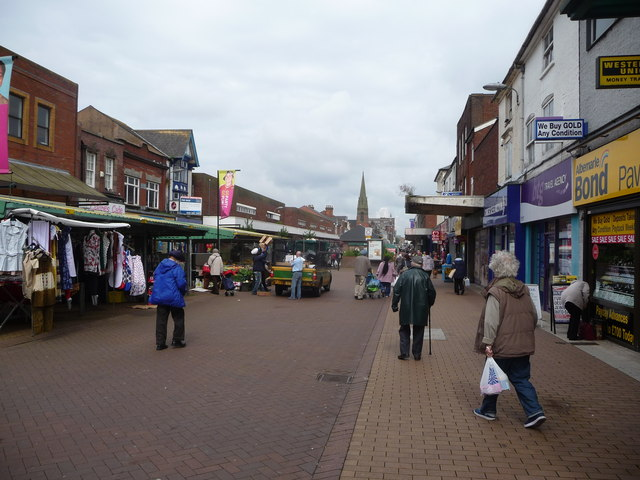
- West Bromwich, the largest town in Sandwell

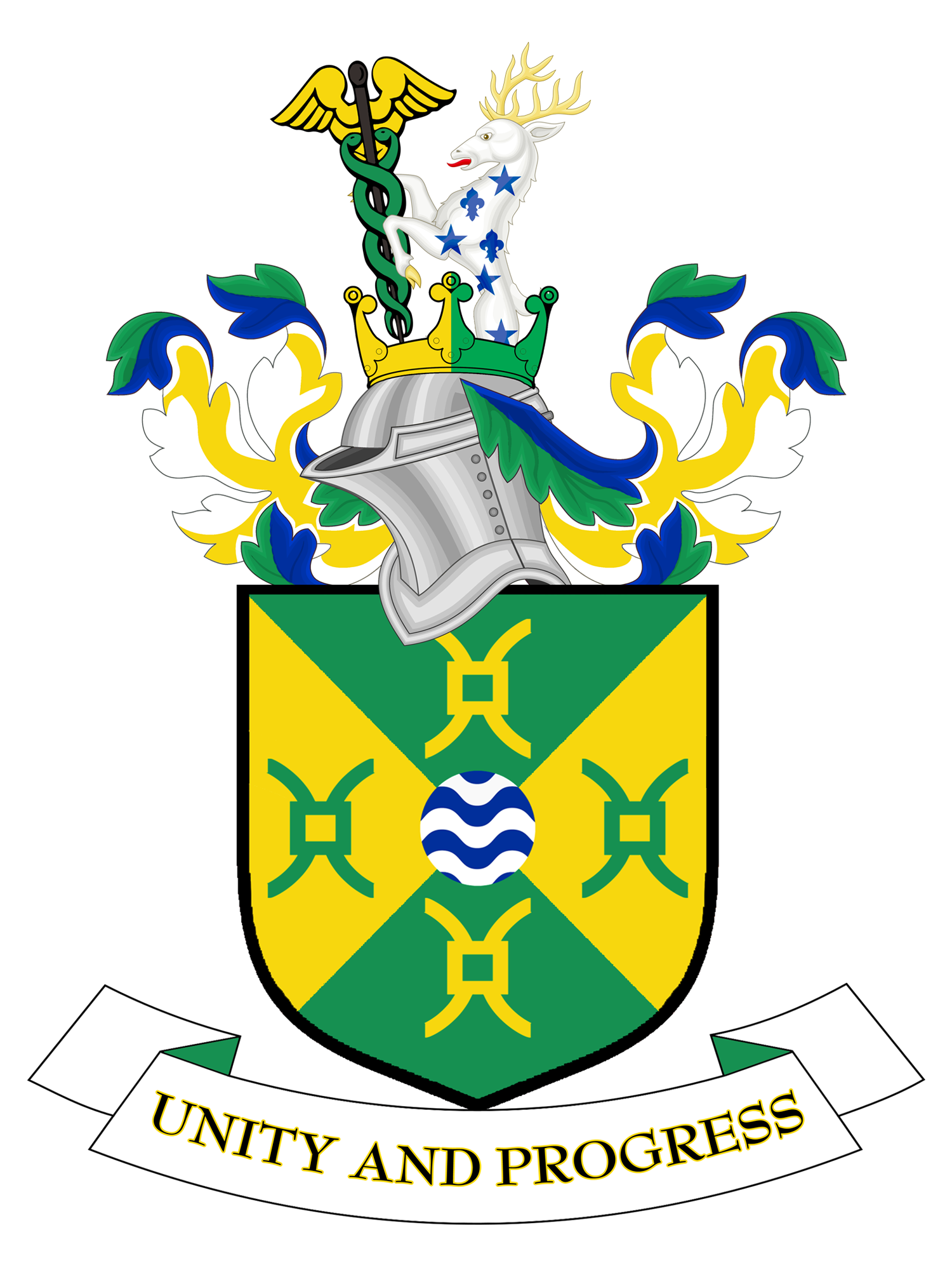
- Coat of arms
- Motto: Unity and Progress
- Sandwell shown within the West Midlands and England
- Coordinates: 52°30′19″N 2°1′2″W
- Sovereign state: United Kingdom
- Constituent country: England
- Region: West Midlands
- Metropolitan county: West Midlands
- Historic County: Staffordshire and Worcestershire
- Status: Metropolitan borough
- Incorporated: 1 April 1974
- Admin HQ: Oldbury

Government
  - Type: Metropolitan district council
  - Body: Sandwell Metropolitan Borough Council
  - Leadership: Leader & Cabinet (Reform UK)
  - MPs: Gurinder Josan (L); Antonia Bance (L); Sarah Coombes (L); Alex Ballinger (L)

Area
  - Total: 33 sq mi (86 km^{2})

Population (2024)
  - Total: 353,860 (Ranked 29th)
  - Density: 9,720/sq mi (3,752/km^{2})

Ethnicity (2021)
  - Ethnic groups: List: 57.2% White; 25.8% Asian; 8.7% Black; 4.3% Mixed; 4% other

Religion (2021)
  - Religion: List: 39.9% Christianity; 26.1% no religion; 13.4% Islam; 11.5% Sikhism; 5.4% not stated; 2.8% Hinduism; 0.7% other; 0.3% Buddhism; 0.1% Judaism
- Time zone: GMT BST
- Postcode: B 43 & 64-71, DY 4, WS 5 & 10, WV 14,
- Area codes: 0121, 01384, 01922
- ISO 3166 code: GB-SAW
- ONS code: 00CS (ONS); E08000028 (GSS)
- OS grid reference: SO9954890217
- NUTS 3: UKG37
- Website: www.sandwell.gov.uk

Sandwell is a metropolitan borough of the West Midlands county in England. The borough is named after Sandwell Priory, and spans a densely populated part of the West Midlands conurbation. Sandwell Metropolitan Borough Council defines the borough as the six amalgamated towns of Oldbury, Rowley Regis, Smethwick, Tipton, Wednesbury and West Bromwich. Rowley Regis includes the towns of Blackheath and Cradley Heath. Sandwell includes part of Great Barr, Birmingham.

Sandwell's Strategic Town Centre is designated as West Bromwich, the largest town in the borough, while Sandwell Council House (the headquarters of the local authority) is situated in Oldbury. In 2025, Sandwell was ranked the ninth most income deprived local authority district in England.

Bordering Sandwell is the City of Birmingham to the east, the Metropolitan Borough of Dudley to the south and west, the Metropolitan Borough of Walsall to the north, and the City of Wolverhampton to the north-west. Spanning the borough are the parliamentary constituencies of West Bromwich, Smethwick, the majority of Tipton and Wednesbury and also part of Halesowen, which both cross into the Dudley borough.

The borough covers an area of 86 square kilometres (33 sq mi). At the 2011 census, it had a population of 309,000.

== History and culture ==
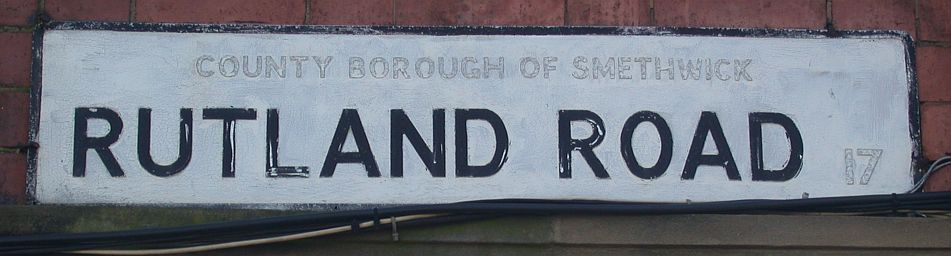
Street nameplate on Rutland Road in Smethwick in April 2007, showing painted out "County Borough" lettering.

The Metropolitan Borough of Sandwell was formed on 1 April 1974 as an amalgamation of the county boroughs of Warley (ceremonially within Worcestershire) and West Bromwich (ceremonially within Staffordshire), under the Local Government Act 1972. Warley had been formed in 1966 by a merger of the county borough of Smethwick with the municipal boroughs of Rowley Regis and Oldbury; at the same time, West Bromwich had absorbed the boroughs of Tipton and Wednesbury.

For its first 12 years of existence, Sandwell had a two-tier system of local government; Sandwell Council shared power with the West Midlands County Council. In 1986 the county council was abolished, and Sandwell effectively became a unitary authority. The borough is divided into 24 wards and is represented by 72 ward councillors on the borough council.

The borough was named after Sandwell Priory, the ruins of which are located in Sandwell Valley. Gaining widespread acceptance for the identity of Sandwell and unifying the distinct communities within the borough has been a protracted affair. The local council has considered changing its name over confusion outside the West Midlands as to the whereabouts of the borough. A survey of borough residents in June 2002 found that 65 per cent of respondents favoured retaining the name.

Landmarks and attractions in Sandwell include Sandwell Aquatics Centre, Wednesbury Museum and Art Gallery, Bishop Asbury Cottage, West Bromwich Manor House, Oak House, West Bromwich, and Sandwell Valley Country Park. It is also the home of West Bromwich Albion F.C.

Sandwell used to be a popular hotspot for car cruising. In 2015 a High Court order was introduced to ban car cruising in the area. The injunction has since been extended, and will remain in force in Sandwell and other areas of the West Midlands county until at least March 2027.

== Economy ==
According to data from the Office of National Statistics, gross disposable household income (GDHI) per head in Sandwell in 2023 was £16,562, the second lowest of any local authority district in the United Kingdom, ahead of only Leicester. Gross disposable household income is a measure of how much money individuals can spend or save after taxes, social benefits, and other income distributions. Similarly, in 2025, Sandwell was ranked as the ninth most income deprived local authority district in England, with 37.4% of its population living in income deprived households.

== Governance ==
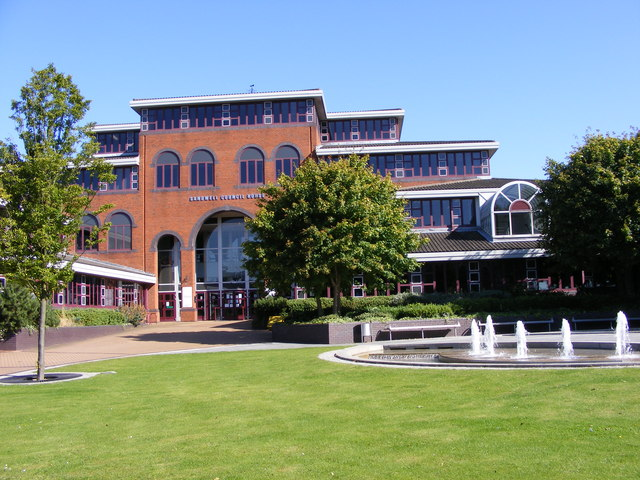
Sandwell Council House, Oldbury

There is one main tier of local government covering Sandwell, being Sandwell Metropolitan Borough Council. The council is based at the Council House on Freeth Street in Oldbury, which was purpose-built for the council in 1989. The council is a member of the West Midlands Combined Authority, led by the directly elected Mayor of the West Midlands.

== Education ==
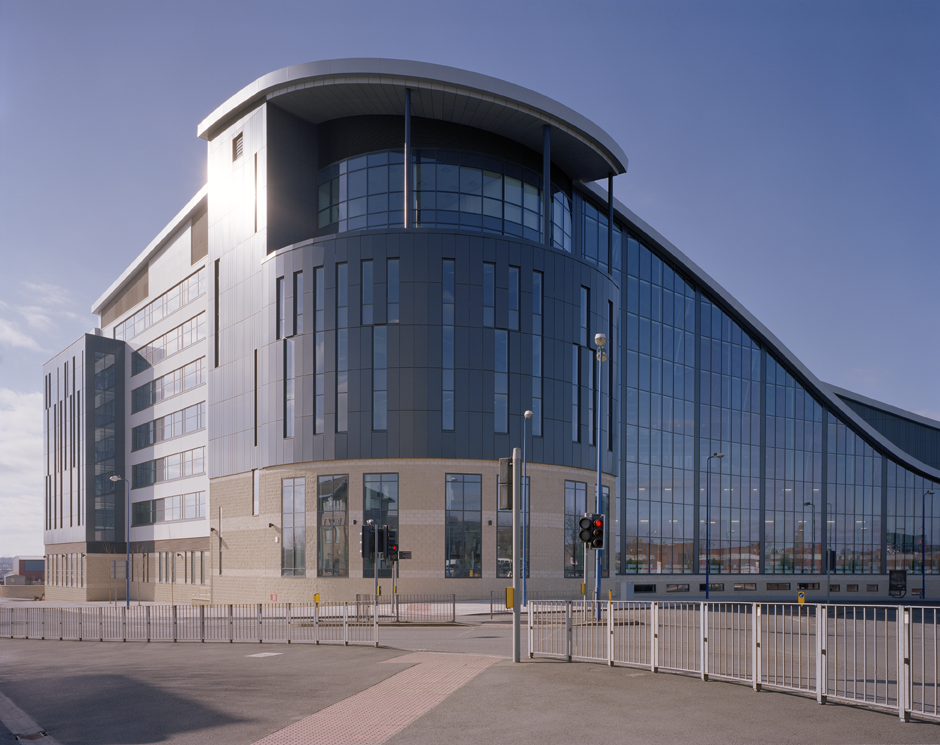
Sandwell College in West Bromwich

Sandwell is home to nearly 100 primary schools, 25 secondary schools, 4 special schools and 1 college.

Sandwell College, the only further education college in the borough, was opened in September 1986 following the merger of Warley College and West Bromwich College. It was originally based in the old Warley College buildings on Pound Road, Oldbury, and the West Bromwich College buildings on West Bromwich High Street, as well as a building in Smethwick town centre, but moved into a new single site campus in West Bromwich town centre in September 2012. In 2004, a debt-ridden Sandwell College was subject to a police investigation.

== Demography ==
=== Ethnicity ===
Ethnic Group	1981 estimations		1991 census		2021 census	
Ethnic Group	Number	%	Number	%	Number	%
White: Total	274,239	88.5%	250,941	85.1%	195,624	57.3%
White: British	–	–	–	–	177,929	52.1%
White: Irish	–	–	–	–	1,591	0.5%
White: Gypsy or Irish Traveller	–	–	–	–	324	0.1%
White: Roma	–	–	–	–	375	0.1%
White: Other	–	–	–	–	15,405	4.5%
Asian or Asian British: Total	25,637		32,352		88,024	25.8%
Asian or Asian British: Indian	19,286		23,539		44,378	13.0%
Asian or Asian British: Pakistani	4,071		5,662		22,148	6.5%
Asian or Asian British: Bangladeshi	1,552		2,289		11,074	3.2%
Asian or Asian British: Chinese	315		340		1,204	0.4%
Asian or Asian British: Other Asian	413		522		9,220	2.7%
Black or Black British: Total	8,441		9,884		29,779	8.7%
Black or Black British: African	213		213		12,668	3.7%
Black or Black British: Caribbean	6,892		8,048		13,103	3.8%
Black or Black British: Other Black	1336		1623		4,008	1.2%
Mixed or British Mixed: Total	–	–	–	–	14,680	4.3%
Mixed: White and Black Caribbean	–	–	–	–	8,030	2.3%
Mixed: White and Black African	–	–	–	–	928	0.3%
Mixed: White and Asian	–	–	–	–	3,274	1.0%
Mixed: Other Mixed	–	–	–	–	2,448	0.7%
Other: Total	1,346		1,623		13,725	4%
Other: Arab	–	–	–	–	2,016	0.6%
Other: Any other ethnic group	1346		1623		11,709	3.4%
Non-White: Total	35,424		43,859		146,208	42.7%
Total	309,663	100%	294,800	100%	341,832	100%

== Media ==
=== Television ===
The area is served by BBC West Midlands and ITV Central. Television signals are received from the Sutton Coldfield TV transmitter.

=== Radio ===
Radio stations for the area are:

BBC Local Radio

- BBC Radio WM

Independent Radio

- Heart West Midlands
- Smooth West Midlands
- Greatest Hits Radio Birmingham & The West Midlands
- Capital Midlands
- Hits Radio Birmingham
- Hits Radio Black Country & Shropshire

Community Radio

- Black Country Radio

=== Newspapers ===
Local newspapers for the area are:

- Express & Star
- Oldbury Weekly News
- Smethwick Telephone
- Tipton Herald
- Wednesbury Herald
- West Bromwich Chronicle

== Notable people ==
See Category:People from Sandwell (district)

== Localities ==
The six towns that comprise Sandwell and localities within each include:

  - Oldbury
    - Brandhall
    - Langley Green
    - Oakham
    - Rood End
  - Rowley Regis
    - Blackheath
    - Cradley Heath
    - Old Hill
    - Tividale
  - Smethwick
    - Albion Estate
    - Black Patch & Soho
    - Bearwood
    - Cape Hill
    - Londonderry
    - North Smethwick
    - Uplands
    - West Smethwick
  - Tipton
    - Dudley Port
    - Great Bridge
    - Horseley Heath
    - Ocker Hill
    - Princes End
    - Summer Hill
- West Bromwich
    - Charlemont and Grove Vale
    - Great Barr (although some areas are part of Birmingham and Walsall)
    - Guns Village
    - Hamstead
    - Hill Top
    - Newton
    - Stone Cross
    - Yew Tree
    - Tamebridge
    - Greets Green
    - Hateley Heath
  - Wednesbury
    - Friar Park
    - Woods Estate
    - Mesty Croft
    - Wood Green
    - Old Park
    - Church Hill
    - Brunswick
    - Myvod

== Local places of interest ==
- The Public, West Bromwich
- Sandwell Aquatics Centre
- Sandwell Priory
- Sandwell Valley
- Sandwell Valley Country Park
- RSPB Sandwell Valley
- Sheepwash Urban Park
- The Hawthorns
- Sandwell General Hospital
- Sandwell College
- Holly Lodge High School
- Warley Woods

== Twin towns and cities ==
Sandwell is twinned with:

- Le Blanc-Mesnil, France
- Vijayawada, India
- Walvis Bay, Namibia

== See also ==
- Wednesbury Central railway station
- Wednesbury bus station
- Wednesbury Town railway station
- Healthcare in West Midlands
