= Horseley Heath =

Area of Tipton, West Midlands, England

Horseley Heath is a residential area of Tipton, in the West Midlands of England. It is situated around the main A461 road which links the major townships of Dudley and Walsall, and stands on the banks of the River Tame.

Tipton was one of the most significant towns during the Industrial Revolution of the 19th century and by 1900 was home to numerous significant factories. There was also a railway link which gave passenger services to major towns including Stourbridge, Dudley, Walsall and West Bromwich.

There is a fine Post Office building with terracotta by Gibbs and Canning, located on the corner of Horseley Heath and Horseley Road and built around 1900.

Horseley Heath was the home of Tipton's last remaining cinema, the Alhambra, on Dudley Port, which closed in August 1963.

Horseley Heath was one of the most hard-hit areas during the fall of the West Midlands manufacturing industry during the 1980s, with many of its factories closing and no new industries replacing them. Many of the former industrial sites have recently been redeveloped for housing, as Tipton's population has surged by around 30% since 1990.

Passenger train services have been absent from Horseley Heath since the mid-1960s, when the Beeching cuts resulted in the closure of the local railway station. The line through Horseley Heath remained open to freight trains until 1993, and is set to re-open in the 2020s as the second phase of the West Midlands Metro.

St Martin's Parish Church was opened on Lower Church Lane in 1797, but closed in 1988 after nearly 200 years in use. The church was known locally as the "Pepperbox" due to the dome shaped top of its tower; however this feature was lost when the tower was rebuilt in 1963.

It had relocated to that site due to the deteriorating condition of the previous church in Upper Church Lane, where it had been based since the 13th or 14th century.

In 2007, the church was converted into a house.

Next door to St Martin's, Tipton Police Station was opened in the 1860s, constructed in distinctive Staffordshire Blue Brick. It was completely rebuilt in 2006.

== Notable people ==
Ben Boucher (1769–1851), known as the 'Dudley Poet', was born in Horseley Heath.
