= Tibbington =

Suburb of Tipton, West Midlands, England

Coordinates: 52.535°N 2.064°W

Tibbington is a residential area of Tipton, a town in the West Midlands of England. It takes its name from the original 11th-century name of Tipton – Tibbingtone.

The Tibbington estate was mostly constructed during the 1920s and 1930s as one of Tipton UDC's first major council housing developments which were aimed at people being rehoused by slum clearances. This included Tipton's 2,000th council house on Central Avenue, which was opened on 21 December 1936 and followed a few months later by the area's 2,500th council house, also on the estate.

The estate's main through route is Central Avenue, which links Princes End High Street to Locarno Road, and is now a bus route.

Nearly 200 new houses were added to the estate in the 1950s with the development of Oval Road.

It is situated within the Princes End council ward, which is one of the most deprived parts of Sandwell. Princes End's problems are particularly highlighted on the Tibbington estate, where a high percentage of residents are unemployed and living on low incomes. Crime is a cause for serious concern in the area; with racism and anti-social behaviour being particularly high profile issues.

A private housing development was built on the south side of the estate in the 1970s following the infilling of a canal and the demolition of an aqueduct.

A section of houses in Laburnum Road, Chestnut Avenue, Fern Avenue and Laurel Road were demolished in 2007 and later redeveloped with a small public park and new housing. All of Elm Crescent and several houses in Central Avenue were demolished in the early 1980s due to mining subsidence and the site was redeveloped as Walker Grange, a residential home for elderly people which was opened on 27 February 1992.
