= Tipton =

Town in the West Midlands, England

Coordinates: 52.5259°N 2.0751°W

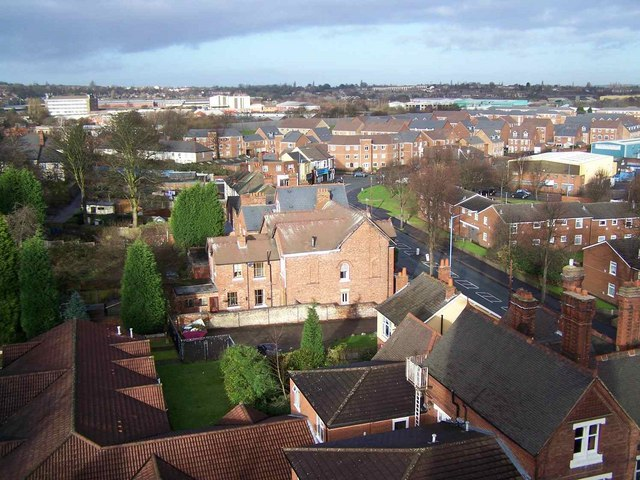
- View from the tower of St Matthew's Church, looking north

- Location within the West Midlands
- Population: 38,777 (2011)
- OS grid reference: SO9592
- Metropolitan borough: Sandwell
- Metropolitan county: West Midlands
- Region: West Midlands
- Country: England
- Sovereign state: United Kingdom
- Areas of the town: List: Princes End; Ocker Hill; Tibbington; Great Bridge; Dudley Port; Tipton Green; Horseley Heath
- Post town: Tipton
- Postcode district: DY4
- Dialling code: 0121
- Police: West Midlands
- Fire: West Midlands
- Ambulance: West Midlands
- UK Parliament: Tipton and Wednesbury

Tipton is an industrial town in Sandwell, in the West Midlands County, England. It had a population of 38,777 at the 2011 UK census. It is located northwest of Birmingham and southeast of Wolverhampton, and is also contiguous with Darlaston, Dudley, Wednesbury and Bilston.

It incorporates the surrounding villages and suburbs of Tipton Green, Ocker Hill, Dudley Port, Horseley Heath and Great Bridge.

Historically within Staffordshire and briefly Worcestershire, Tipton was an urban district until 1938, when it became a municipal borough. Much of the borough was transferred into West Bromwich County Borough in 1966, but parts of the old borough were absorbed into an expanded Dudley borough and the newly created County Borough of Warley. Along with the rest of West Bromwich and Warley, Tipton was moved into the Sandwell Metropolitan Borough in 1974.

== Toponymy ==
Tipton gains its name from the Anglo-Saxon name Tibba followed by tun, the Old English word for farm or settlement. The town of Tipton was recorded as Tibintone in the Domesday Book of 1086, meaning Tibba's estate. The present spelling of Tipton derives from the 16th century. The town was nicknamed the 'town of a hundred tips', although its name is much older.

== History ==
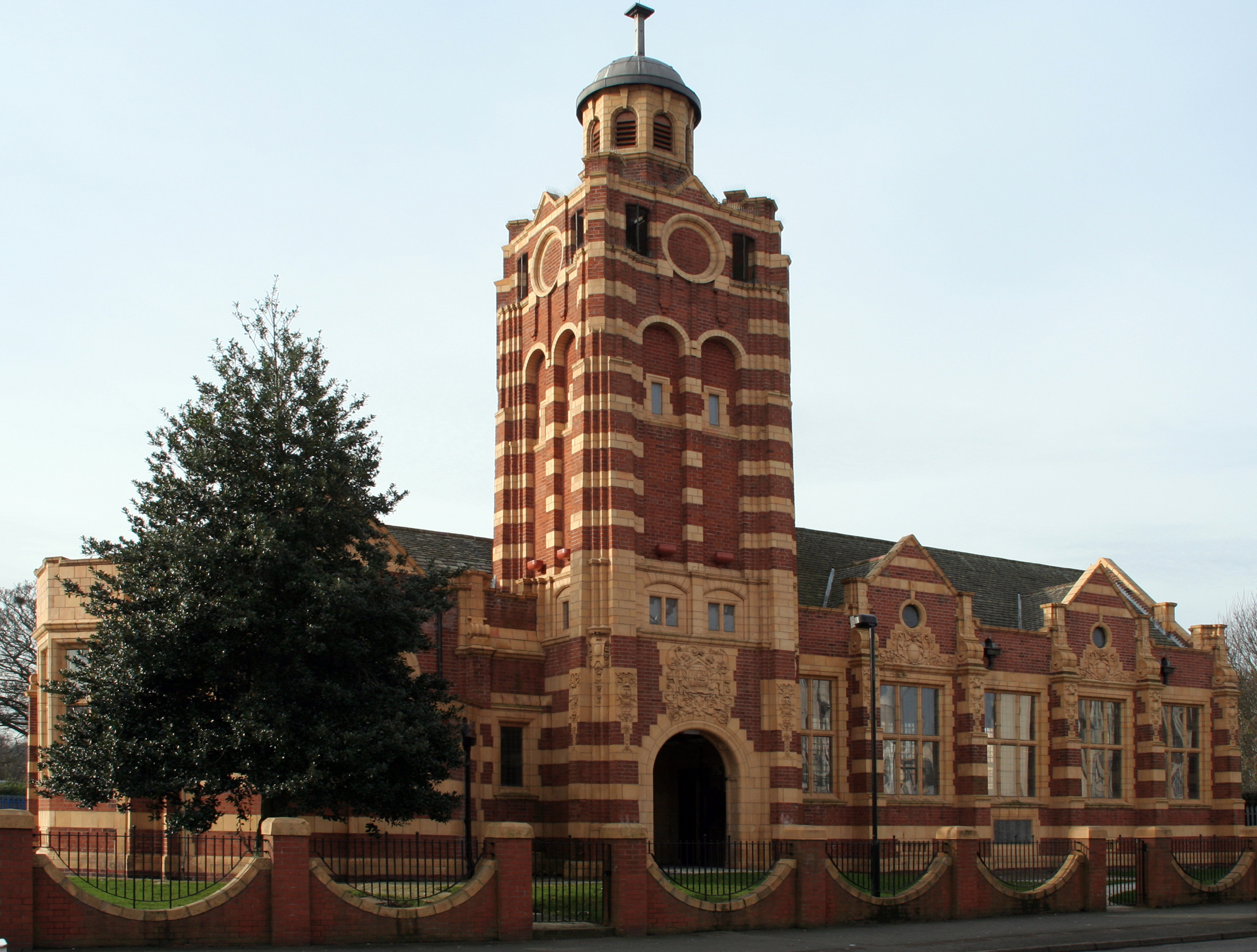
Grade II listed Tipton District Library, which was built in 1905 but has not been used as a library since the service was moved to a new site in the town centre in 2000

Until the 18th century, Tipton was a collection of small hamlets. Industrial growth (proto-industrialization) started in the town when ironstone and coal were discovered in the 1770s. A number of canals were built through the town and later railways, which greatly accelerated its industrialisation.

In the 1770s, James Watt built his first steam engine to pump water from the Bloomfield Colliery in Tipton. In 1780, James Keir and Alexander Blair set up a chemical works there, making alkali and soap on a large scale.

The 1801 census records 834 houses with 872 families living in Tipton: 46 houses were stated as being empty. An adult population of 4,280 is recorded with males numbered at 2,218 and females at 2,062. Iron making and coal mining were the main employment for the population. Trades and manufacturing provided work for 1,740 people and other jobs totalled 2,484. Between Tipton and Dudley there were a few farms listed, which gave employment to 56 people.

Expansion in the iron and coal industries led to the population of Tipton expanding rapidly through the 19th century, going from 4,000 at the beginning of the century to 30,000 at the end. Tipton gained a reputation as being "the quintessence of the Black Country" because chimneys of local factories belched heavy pollution into the air, whilst houses and factories were built side by side. Several family businesses like James Lister and Sons, an ironmongery, emerged during this time to support industries by providing essential supplies. Most of the traditional industries which once dominated the town have since disappeared.

In the Tipton Catastrophe of March 1922, 19 girls – as young as 13 – and young women were killed in an explosion at an unlicensed factory that was dismantling surplus World War I munitions.

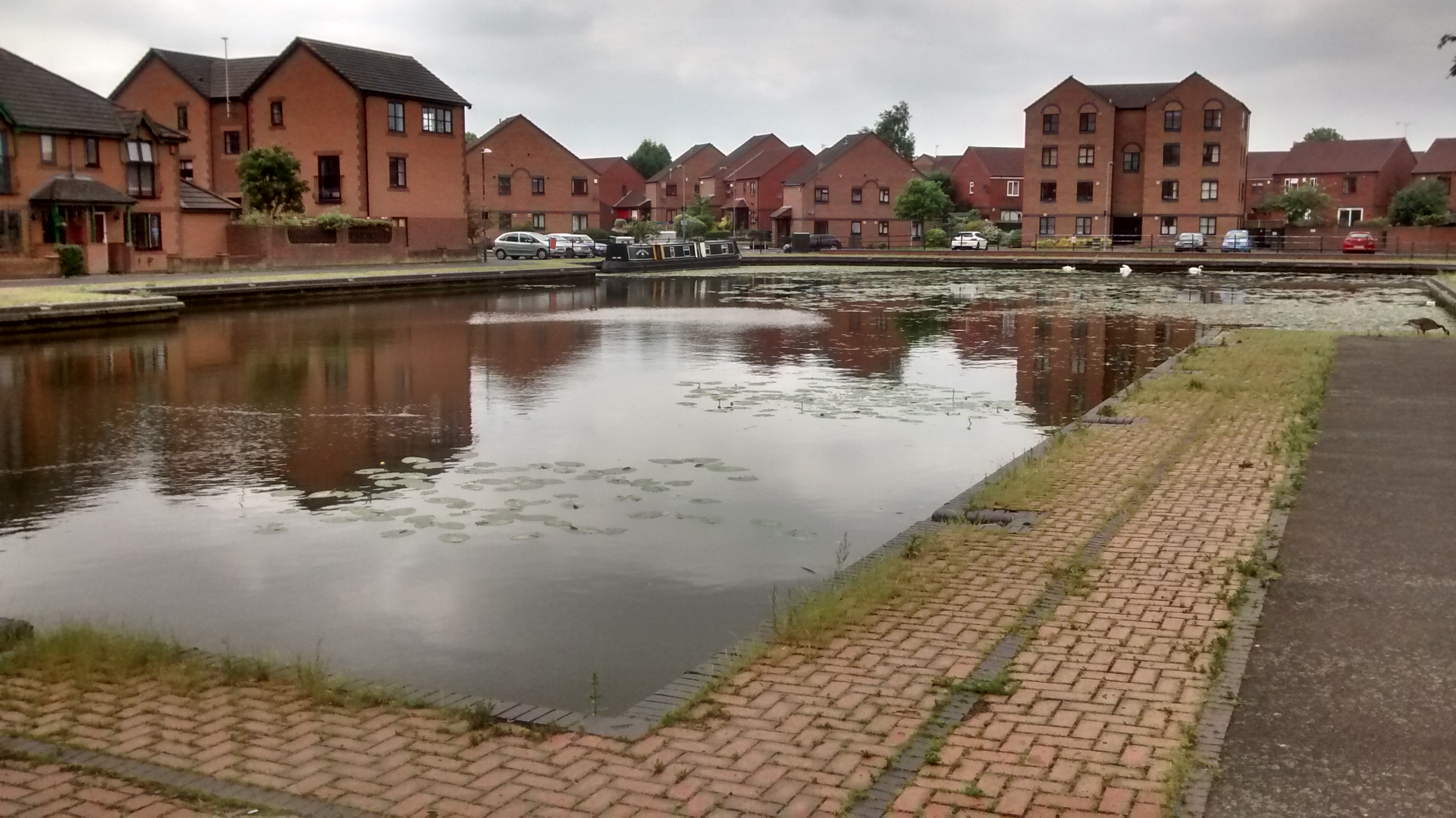
Tividale Quays Basin, Dudley Port, Tipton, on the BCN Old Main Line

The Black Country Living Museum in nearby Dudley re-creates life in the early 20th century Black Country, in original buildings which have been rebuilt and furnished, many of them being transported from – or based on – sites originally located in Tipton. There is a residential canal basin at the museum, reflecting Tipton's former status in popular local culture as the 'Venice of the Midlands'. Some of the town's canals were infilled during the 1960s and 1970s. The towpaths of the remaining canals, the Old and New BCN Main Lines are today a cycling, wildlife and leisure facility.

The landscape of Tipton began to change further from the late 1920s when new housing estates were built by the town's council in response to the growing need to replace slum housing. Among the first council estates to be built were the Shrubbery Estate at Tipton Green, the Tibbington Estate near Princes End (which came under Coseley at the time), the Moat Farm Estate at Ocker Hill (which earned the nickname "Lost City" due to its isolated location), and the Cotterill's Farm Estate at Ocker Hill, the Glebefields Estate at Ocker Hill and Great Bridge. Private houses were also built on smaller developments around the same time. The "Lost City" was integrated with the rest of Tipton as further housing developments sprang up around it, namely The Glebefields Estate and The Gospel Oak Estate.

During the Second World War (1939–1945), Nazi Germany made The Blitz, a bombing campaign against the United Kingdom (7 September 1940 to 11 May 1941). There were a number of air raids on Tipton. On 19 November 1940, three people were killed by a Luftwaffe bomb which was dropped in Bloomfield Road and destroyed several buildings including the Star public house; it was rebuilt after the war and demolished in 1996. Just before Christmas in 1940, an anti-aircraft shell fired from the hills at Rowley Regis fell down the chimney of the Boat Inn, Dudley Road East, Tividale; fatally injuring 12 people at a wedding reception (including the bride, while the groom lost both legs) as well as the resident of an adjacent house. On 17 May 1941, six people died in an air raid in New Road, Great Bridge. Tipton Tavern and New Road Methodist Church were destroyed and a number of nearby houses were damaged. Tipton Tavern landlord Roger Preece was trapped in the rubble but survived with minor injuries.

Tipton Tavern was rebuilt in the 1950s and became the Hallbridge Arms during the 1990s and, more recently, the Pearl Girl, the world's first licensed pearl bar. It closed in 2016 and has since been converted into a day nursery for young children.

The last major council housing development by Tipton Council was the Glebefields Estate part of Ocker Hill and not Princes End as many suggest, due to Princes End not being part of Tipton at this time, and built during the first half of the 1960s. A stretch of the Wednesbury Oak Loop Canal was filled in to make way for it. The last major private housing development to be built in the Municipal Borough of Tipton was the Foxyards Estate, on land straddling the borders with Dudley and Coseley, in the mid 1960s.

By the end of the 1970s, most of the housing in Tipton built before 1890 had been demolished. Owen Street, the town's main shopping area, was redeveloped between 1979 and 1982, with a reduced number of shop units as well as new low-rise council houses and flats.

In 1956, one of Britain's first comprehensive schools, Tividale Comprehensive School, was opened in Tipton near the border with Oldbury, in the area which became part of Warley a decade later and was not included in the modern Tipton DY4 postal district.

Tipton's first gasworks was opened in 1958 and redeveloped as a state-of-the-art naphtha gas plant by 1965, but owing to the emergence of North Sea gas, the gasworks closed in 1975 and stood empty for a decade before demolition. The site of the gas plant was redeveloped as the 'Standbridge Park housing estates' in the 1990s.

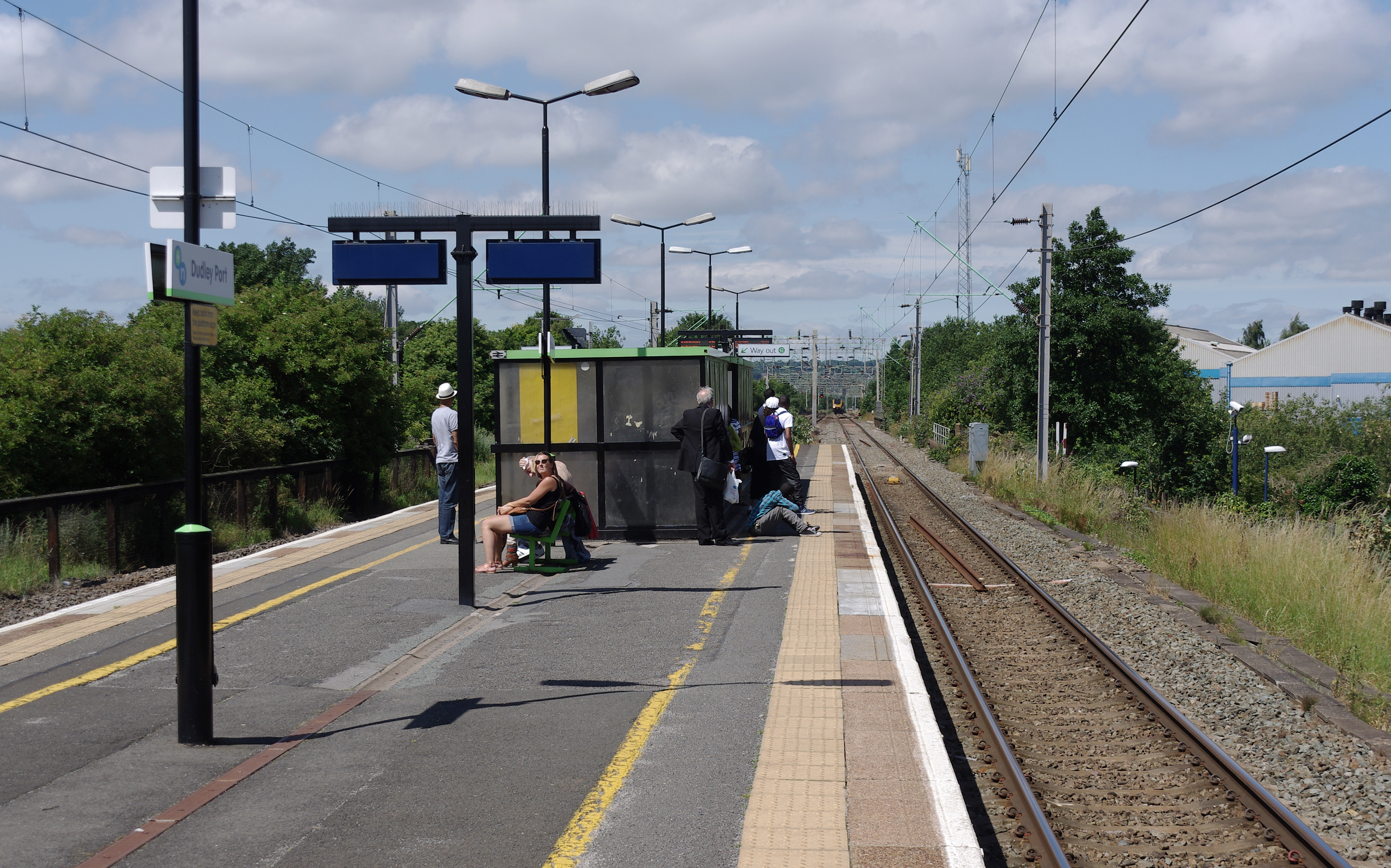
Dudley Port railway station

Tipton has two railway stations, the main railway station at Owen Street and another station at Dudley Port. There were several other stations in the town on three different railway lines, but these were gradually closed between 1916 and 1964 as passenger trains were phased out on these lines. The Dudley-Wolverhampton railway line, which straddled Tipton's border with Coseley, closed in 1968. The Princes End Branch Line, which was only two miles long, closed in 1981. The South Staffordshire Line through Tipton, which led to Walsall northwards and Dudley southwards, closed in 1993. The part of the line between Wednesbury and Brierley Hill was scheduled to re-open in 2025 as a part of Midland Metro line 2.

Most of the archive collection for Tipton is held at Sandwell Community History and Archives Service; some items have been retained by the town's library.

== Economy and industry ==
Tipton was one of the key towns in the Industrial Revolution of the 19th century. Even during the 18th century it had established its first key industries. This included the world's first successful steam pumping engine, which was erected at Conygre Coalworks in 1712 by industrialist Thomas Newcomen. A full-size replica of the engine now exists at the Black Country Living Museum just over Tipton's borders in Dudley.

In 1800, Tipton was a predominantly rural area, with a few coal mines and some 4,000 residents. Mass building of factories and digging of coal mines then took place, and resulted in Tipton becoming a heavily built-up and industrialised area with more than 30,000 residents by the end of the 19th century. The town's population grew further in the 20th century after new housing developments, mostly by the local council but with a significant number in the private sector. Local industry also expanded further during this time.

In 1840, the Batson family established a lubricant blending plant to serve the local industries at the junction of High Street and Dudley Road. The site is still operational today, owned by German refiner H&R AG, although the original buildings have long since been replaced.

Coal mining had disappeared from Tipton by the mid-20th century, and the town lost a large percentage of its factories during the recessions of the 1970s and 1980s, which contributed to a rise in unemployment and poverty in Tipton, while living conditions continued to improve.

Bean Cars, a company that manufactured cars and lorry engines and other vehicle parts, had a factory in Tipton. Further industrial sites have been abandoned since the 1970s, paving the way for mass private house building on the land. The town's naphtha gas plant opened in 1965 but closed just 10 years later, unable to compete with natural gas from the North Sea. The gasworks stood abandoned for about a decade afterwards, when it was finally demolished. Standeridge Park housing estate was built on its site during the 1990s. By the late 2000s, most of the town's large factories had closed.

Horseley Ironworks, built steel structures, such as the 400 kV Thames Crossing at Thurrock, the tallest in the UK.

== Geography ==
- Great Bridge, located in the western section of the town around Great Bridge town centre, near the border with West Bromwich
- Dudley Port, located south of the Dudley Port train station, adjacent to Dudley and Tividale.
- Horseley Heath, between Great Bridge and Dudley Port
- Ocker Hill, located in the very north of the town, on the border with Wednesbury, 1 mile (1.6 km) west of Princes End high street. The area includes the Leabrook Road estate, Toll End, and Moat Farm (locally known as "the Lost City").
- Princes End, located immediately north of Princes end high street, on the border with Bilston
- Tibbington, between Princes End high street and Tipton town centre
- Tipton Green, the area surrounding the town centre
- Glebefields, located around the western section of St Mark's road, south-east of Princes End high street

== Governance ==
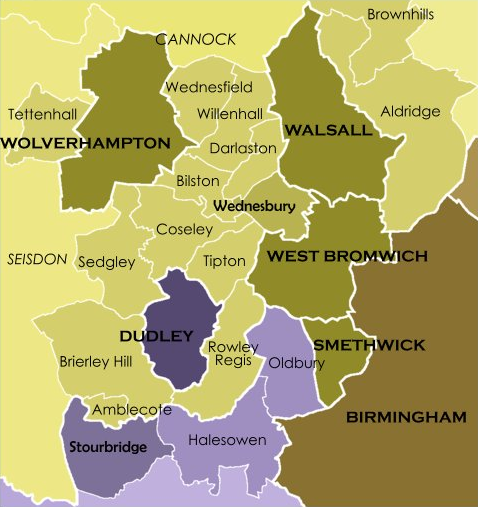
The local government structure within North Worcestershire and South Staffordshire, prior to the West Midlands Order 1965 reorganisation

Until 1966, the town had its own council. The urban district council of Tipton was formed in 1894 contained only the civil parish of Tipton, then received Municipal Borough status in 1938. The headquarters were originally based in a 19th-century building on Owen Street until 1935 when it relocated to the former Bean offices site on Sedgley Road West, straddling the border with Coseley. The council remained at that site for the next 31 years, until the dissolution of the borough council.

On 1 April 1966 the district was abolished and the bulk of the Tipton borough was absorbed into an expanded County Borough of West Bromwich, although a fragment of the town near the border with Coseley (including the former council offices and the bulk of the new Foxyards housing estate) was absorbed into the County Borough of Dudley and most of the Tividale area became part of the new County Borough of Warley. In this reorganisation, the township of Tipton was expanded around Princes End to take over a section of the former Coseley urban district. The parish was also abolished on 1 April 1966 and merged with West Bromwich and Dudley, part also went to form Warley. In 1961 the parish had a population of 38,100. The headquarters building was later taken over by Dudley College, who retained it until 1993. It has since been occupied by businesses and training scheme providers.

Since 1974, Tipton has been split between the Metropolitan Borough of Sandwell, which was created by a merger of the former West Bromwich and Warley boroughs, and the neighbouring Metropolitan Borough of Dudley.

== Education ==
=== Secondary schools ===
- Q3 Academy Tipton (formerly Tipton Central School, Tipton Grammar School and Alexandra High School and Sixth Form Centre, Ace Academy)
- Gospel Oak School (formerly Willingsworth High School and RSA Academy)

The town has two secondary schools, though in the Tipton Green area of the town a significant percentage of children attend High Arcal School in the borough of Dudley. Ormiston Sandwell Academy, formed in September 2009 from Tividale High School, also takes in pupils from parts of Dudley and Oldbury.

Until 1958 there was also a secondary school at Ocker Hill, which was then replaced by Willingsworth Secondary Modern School.

Alexandra High School was formed in 1969 on a merger of Tipton Grammar School and Park Lane Boys and Girls Secondary Modern Schools, with the Park Lane buildings being retained until 1990 for the teaching of younger pupils at the new school.

=== Primary schools ===
- Tipton Green Junior School – on Park Lane West, Tipton Green, Tipton. Started in 1880 at a site on Sedgley Road West before relocating to Park Lane West in 1976, a new building opening in that building's grounds in 2011.
- Victoria Infant School – in Queen's Road, Tipton Green. Opened in 1995 to replace Manor Road Infant School, which was built in the 1930s. The current school exists on the site of the former Park Lane Secondary Modern School, which was later an annex for the younger pupils of Alexandra High School and Sixth Form Centre.
- Summerhill Primary Academy (formerly Summerhill Primary School) – on Central Avenue, Tibbington, on the merger of Locarno Primary School and Prince's End Primary School
- Great Bridge Primary School – in Mount Street, Great Bridge, Tipton
- Ocker Hill Infant and Nursery School - located in Prospect Street, Ocker Hill, Tipton
- Ocker Hill Junior School – located in Gospel Oak Road, Ocker Hill, Tipton
- Glebefields Primary School – located on Sandgate Road, the Glebefields Estate, Ocker Hill, Tipton
- Sacred Heart Primary School – originally located on Victoria Road, Tipton Green and was Tipton's only Roman Catholic school. Recently relocated to a new site on Sedgley Road East after pupil admission numbers rapidly increased. The previous building still remains unoccupied.
- Wednesbury Oak Primary School – off Wednesbury Oak Road, Tipton. It was constructed in 1972 to serve the recently built Wednesbury Oak housing estate.
- St Paul's Church of England Primary School – off Robert Road. It was formed in 1874 at a site in Wood Street. It remained at this site until 1992, when it relocated to a new building in nearby Robert Road. It takes its name from the parish church of St Paul, which opened in Owen Street, Tipton, in 1839.
- St Martin's Church of England Primary School – on Upper Church Lane, Tipton
- Joseph Turner Primary School – on Powis Avenue, Cotterills Farm Estate, Ocker Hill, Tipton
- Jubilee Park Primary School – on Highfield Road, the Glebefields Estate, Ocker Hill, Tipton
- Burnt Tree Primary School – on Hill Road, Burnt Tree Estate, Tipton
- Foxyards Primary School – on Foxyards Road, Foxyards Estate, Tipton

== Religion ==
- Tipton Christian Church was established around 70 years ago and today is a Pentecostal Church situated in Waterloo Street.
- Tipton Family Church was established in November 1992. It is an Evangelical Christian fellowship.
- St Matthew's Church Tipton is a Church of England Evangelical church on Dudley Road, established in 1890.
- St Mark's Church Ocker Hill is a Church of England church in the Anglo-Catholic tradition.
- The Elite Church, formerly the Church of St Martin and St Paul, is in Owen Street.

== Transport ==
The M5 motorway between the West Midlands and the West Country and its junction with the M6 motorway passes a few miles to the South and East of the town but not through the town itself. The M5 runs along the eastern region passing over canals and railways. M5 Junction 1 is accessible at West Bromwich using the A41 road Black Country Spine Road. M5 Junction 2 is accessible at Oldbury on the A4123 Wolverhampton Road (Harborne to Wolverhampton) at Birchley Island. The M5 also enables access to other motorways.

Tipton Town Centre has direct bus links with the towns of Dudley, Sedgley, West Bromwich and Bilston on Diamond Bus services 42 and 229. Additionally, Princes End and Gospel Oak have service 11/11A to Walsall and Wednesbury, and service 43 to Bilston. These are operated by West Midlands Bus.

=== Railways ===
Tipton has direct, frequent rail services to Wolverhampton and Walsall via Birmingham New Street with some additional services during evening rush hour direct to Telford and Shrewsbury. There are two railway stations - Tipton in the town centre and Dudley Port. Both are on the electrified line from Birmingham New Street to Wolverhampton which is a section of the West Coast Main Line.

Closed lines include that from Walsall to Stourbridge, closed to all traffic in 1993 after some 150 years in use. This line had served stations at Dudley Port Lower Level and Great Bridge North, but both were closed in 1964 by the Beeching cuts. The line is set to re-open around 2023, with the lines shared between goods trains and the West Midlands Metro.

In October 2015, it was announced that due to high transport funding for the West Midlands, the Stourbridge to Walsall line could re-open as a Network Rail operated line served by West Midlands franchise services and the delivery date was 2018–2020, however this did not occur. Instead, the line will partially reopen operated by the West Midlands Metro as its second line, running between Wednesbury and Brierley Hill. Services are anticipated to start in 2025 and the stations within the Tipton boundaries will be Great Bridge, Horseley Heath, Dudley Port (Low Level), Sedgley Road East and Birmingham New Road.

The line between Great Bridge and Swan Village in nearby West Bromwich was closed in 1968 under the Beeching cuts, and most of its route was occupied by the southern section of the Black Country Spine Road, completed in 1995.

The line between Princes End and Ocker Hill closed to passenger trains in 1916 but remained open to goods traffic until 1981. The closure of the railway was followed by the construction of a pedestrian walkway on the trackbed, while the tunnel under the road at Ocker Hill was filled in. The final stub of the line, which linked Wednesbury with Ocker Hill Power Station, was closed in 1991.

The Dudley-Wolverhampton railway closed in 1968, several years after passenger trains were withdrawn, and by the 1990s some sections of it had been built over, making it impossible to reopen this route at any stage. The former Tipton Five Ways and Princes End & Coseley stations were redeveloped for housing and road access. A bridge abundment that carried the line in and out of Tipton Five Ways another on the Birmingham New Road near the Black Country Museum are some of the last remaining signs of this railway in Tipton.

== Sport ==
Tipton football club was established in 1872. Its colours, registered with the Birmingham Football Association, were Navy Blue. J. Spicer Leach was secretary and the club played at Horseley Road. On 18 November 1876, Tipton beat the Aston Villa Football Club first-team 1-0 in the Birmingham Senior Cup. They were knocked out by Saltley College in the next round.

Tipton Town Football Club were formed in 1948 as Ocker Hill United, adopting their current name in 1967. They currently play in the non-league West Midland league division one and made history in the 2010-11 football season by reaching the FA Cup first round proper for the first time in their history, earning a trip to Carlisle United, the League One (third highest English division) club. They were the first club that Steve Bull played for; he joined them on leaving school in 1981 and remained with them until he signed for West Bromwich Albion, a top division club, in 1985. However, it was after signing for Wolverhampton Wanderers in November 1986 that Bull achieved fame; by the time he retired in 1999, he had scored more than 300 goals for the club. He was also capped 13 times by the England national football team between May 1989 and October 1990, scoring four goals.

The Sandwell Steelers who are an American football team who play in the BAFA National Leagues operate from the Tipton Sports Academy.

== Media ==
Local news and television programmes are provided by BBC West Midlands and ITV Central. Television signals are received from the Sutton Coldfield TV transmitter. Local radio stations are BBC Radio WM, Capital Midlands, Heart West Midlands, Smooth West Midlands, Greatest Hits Radio Birmingham & The West Midlands, and Black Country Radio, a community based station which broadcast to the town and across the Black Country. The town is served by the local newspapers, Dudley News and Express & Star.

== Notable people ==
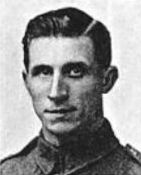
Joseph John Davies VC, 1924

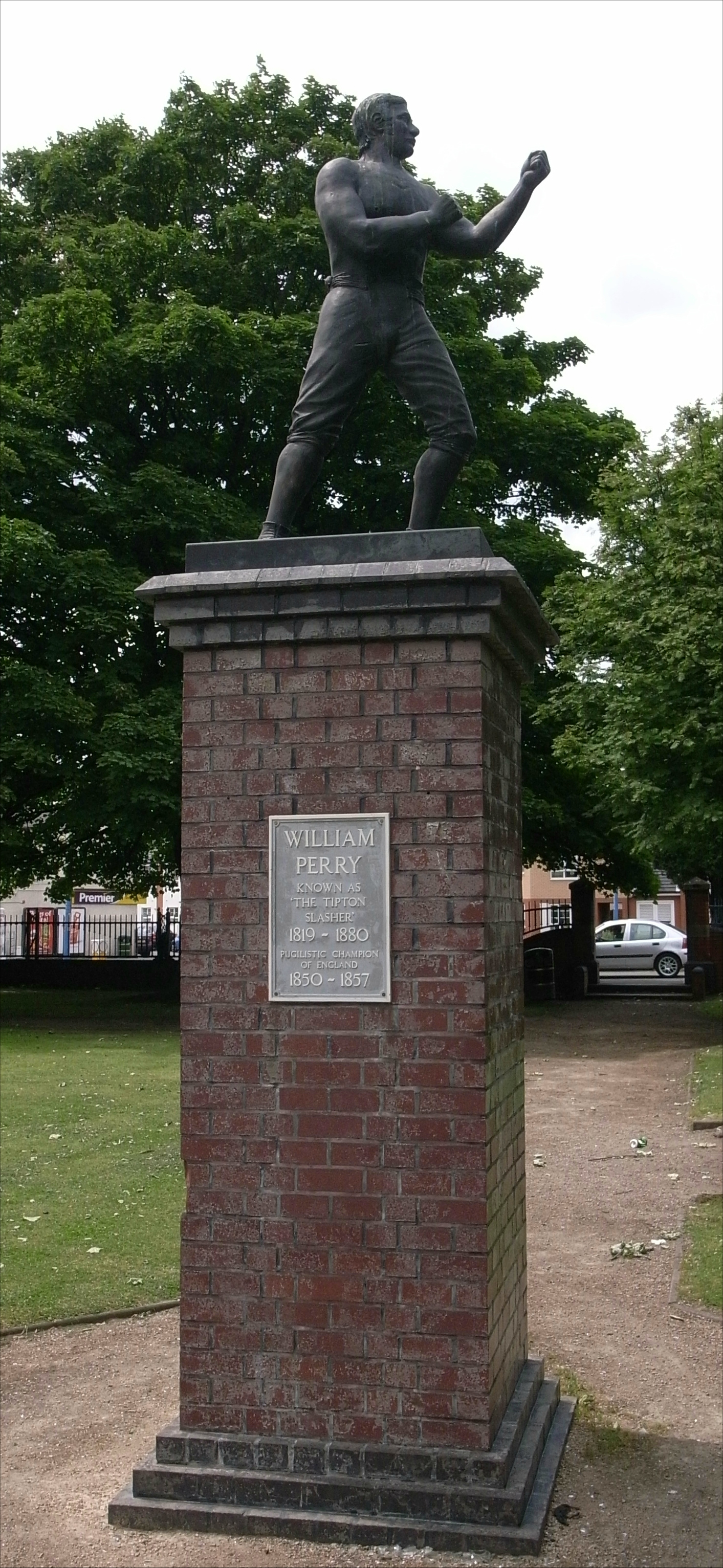
local statue of William Perry The Tipton Slasher

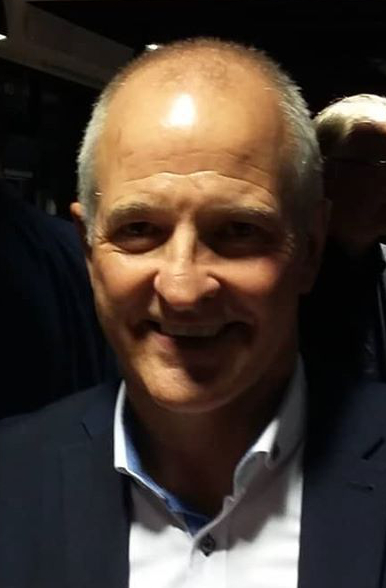
Steve Bull, 2019

- Ben Boucher (1769–1851), poet, described life in Dudley in the Black Country during the 19th century
- George Benjamin Thorneycroft (1791–1851), ironmaster and the first mayor of Wolverhampton
- Joseph Williams (c.1800–1834), coal-miner and composer of sacred music, lived in Watery Lane, Tipton
- Margaret Macdonald Mackintosh (1864–1933) and Frances Macdonald (1873–1921), artist sisters, founding work in the Glasgow style
- Sir Ebenezer Parkes (1848–1919), politician, MP for Birmingham Central from 1895 to 1918
- Francis Albert Eley Crew FRS FRSE (1886–1973), animal geneticist
- Joseph John Davies VC (1889−1976), Army staff-sergeant, recipient of the Victoria Cross
- Nicky James (1943–2007), musician and music writer; performed with acts in the early "Brumbeat" scene
- Philip Bradbourn (1951–2014), politician, MEP, attended Tipton Grammar School
- Syeda Khatun (born 1969), politician, councillor for Tipton Green; the first Bangladeshi woman elected in the Midlands

=== Sport ===
- William Perry (1819–1880), Victorian bareknuckle boxer and Champion of England, aka 'The Tipton Slasher'; there is a statue of him in the Coronation Gardens, Tipton
- Billy Jones (1881–1948), footballer who played 392 games including 183 for Birmingham City
- Bertie Stevens (1886–1943), cricketer who played 33 First-class cricket matches
- Fred Morris (1893–1962), footballer who played 287 games for The Albion and 2 for England
- William Lockett (1893–1974), footballer who played 191 games including 185 for Wolves
- Albert Langford (1899–1965), footballer who played 343 games including 135 for Charlton Athletic
- Bill Turner (1901–1989), footballer who played 281 games for Crystal Palace
- Jack Holden (1907–2004), long distance runner, ran in the Olympic and Commonwealth Games; a local public garden was named after him
- Bill Richardson (1908–1985), footballer who played 319 games for The Albion
- Ike Clarke (1915-2002), footballer, played 327 games, including 108 for The Albion
- Reg Davies (1933–2019), football goalkeeper who played 296 games including 199 for Millwall
- Alec Jackson (1937-2023), footballer, played over 300 games including for 192 for The Albion
- Roy Addison (1939–2021), middleweight boxer, competed in the 1960 Summer Olympics
- Joe Mayo (born 1951), footballer, played over 260 games including 155 for Leyton Orient
- Steve Bull MBE (born 1965), footballer, played 504 games, including 474 for Wolves and also 13 for England
- David Burrows (born 1968), footballer, played 397 games
- Brian Smikle (born 1985), footballer who has played over 250 games including 137 for Kidderminster Harriers
- Scott Baker (born 1986), darts player, plays with the Professional Darts Corporation
- Jamie Hughes (born 1986), darts player, plays with the Professional Darts Corporation
- Yan Dhanda (born 1998), footballer, played 160 games
- Chris Brookes (born 1991), professional wrestler, born in Tipton
