= Greets Green =

Area in West Bromwich, West Midlands, England

Coordinates: 52.5199°N 2.0209°W

Greets Green (usually pronounced 'Grits Green') is a residential area of West Bromwich in the West Midlands of England. The appropriate Sandwell ward is called Greets Green and Lyng. The population taken at the 2011 census was 11,769. It was mostly developed between 1920 and 1970 with a mix of private and council housing, though there are still buildings in the area which date from before the First World War. A lot of the older housing in the area has been procured by development companies and have been knocked down or are ready to be knocked down to make way for more modern housing.

The area is considered to be the birthplace of West Bromwich Albion Football Club. The club was founded in 1878 as West Bromwich Strollers. Most of the players lived and worked in Albion, a district of West Bromwich close to what is today Greets Green.

One of the main civic amenities is the Marl Hole Park (known colloquially as the Marl 'ole), bounded by Hambletts Road, Gads Lane and Guns Village Primary School. Previously the site was a source of clay for the manufacture of bricks by Joseph Hamblett's firm.

The Walsall Canal runs through the area.

As part of the Silver Jubilee celebrations in 1977, Queen Elizabeth II drove through the area, up Oak Road into West Bromwich town centre.
