= River Tame, West Midlands =

River in the West Midlands of England

River Tame
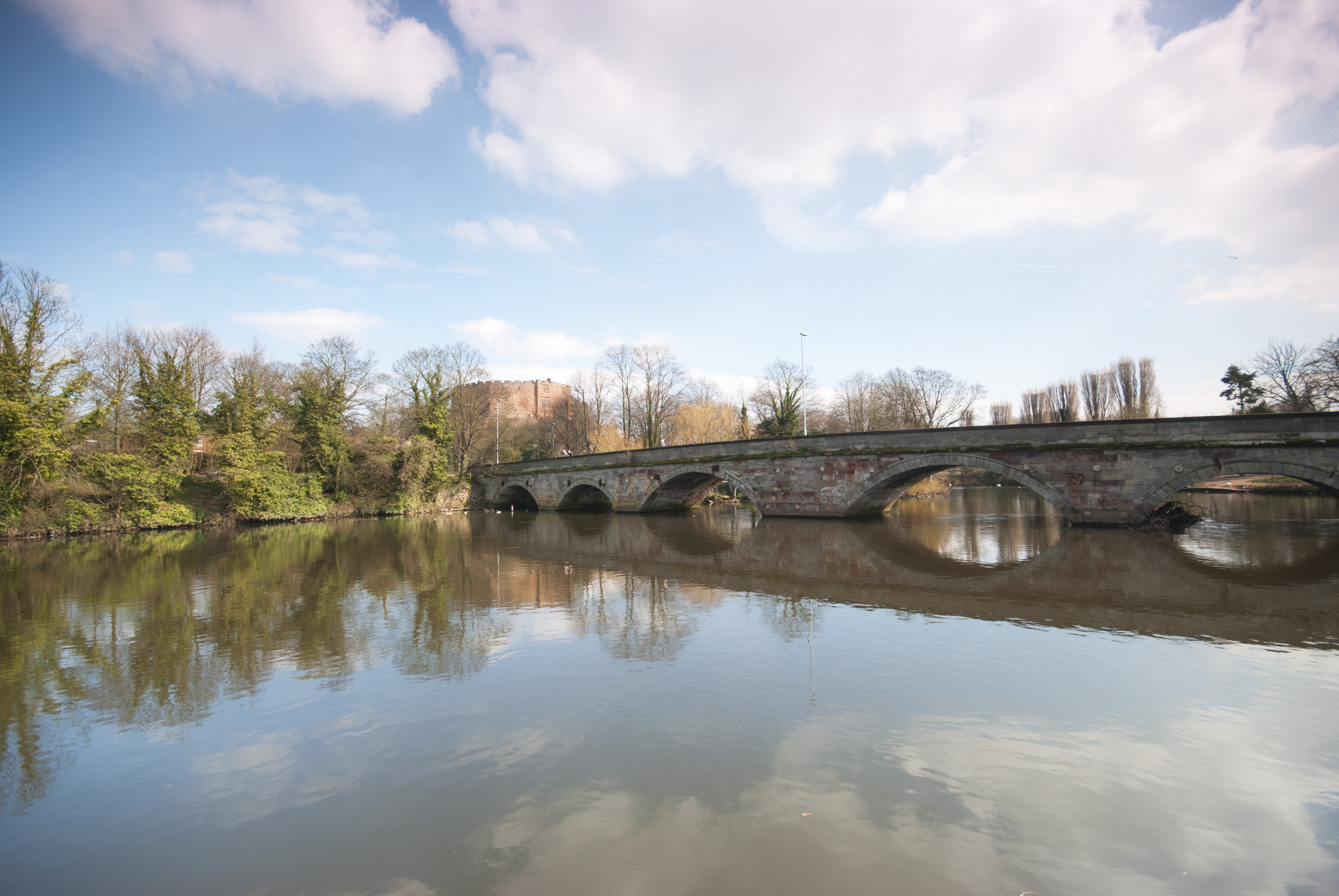
- The Tame at Tamworth, which takes its name from the river.

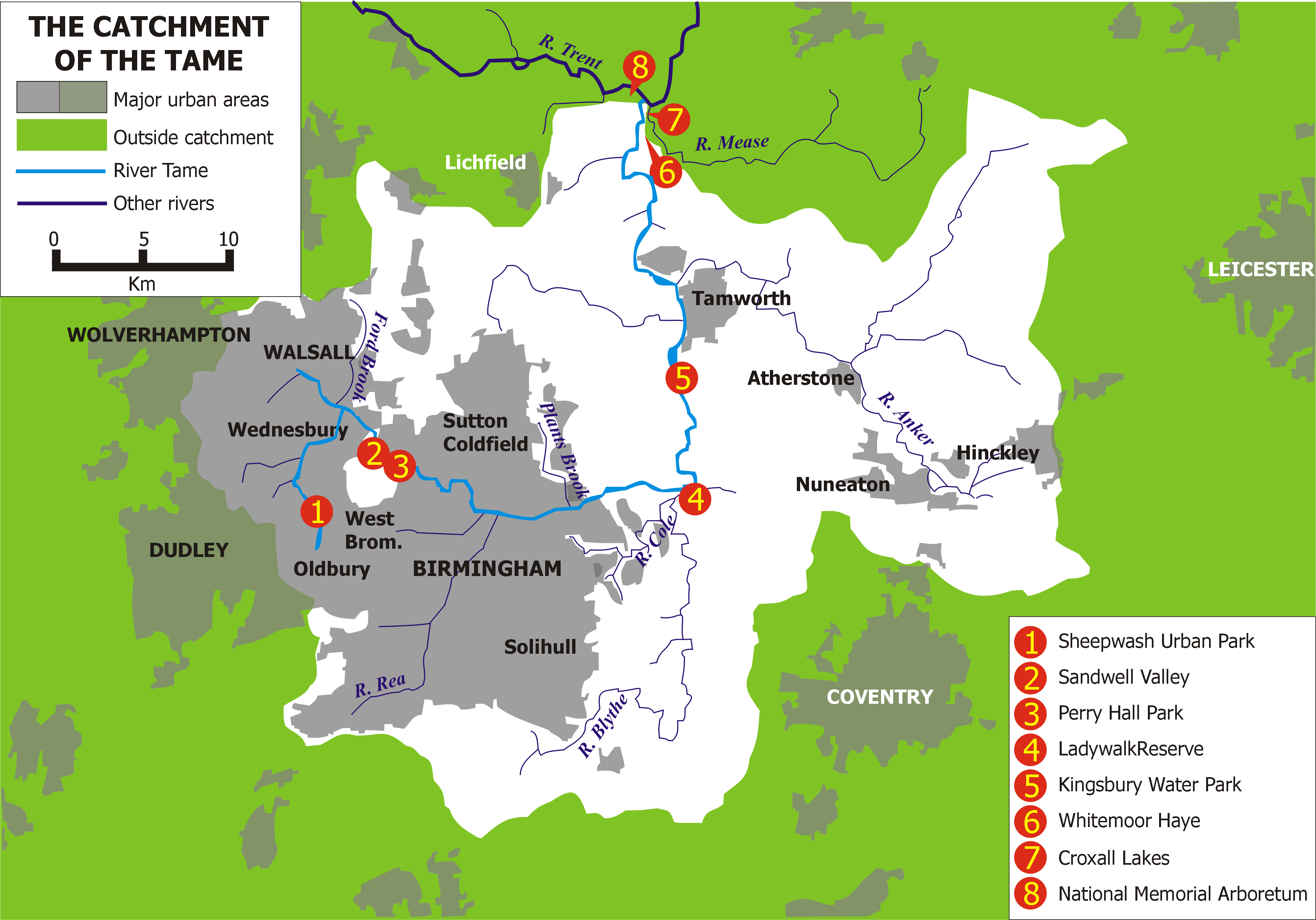
- Sketchmap of the course and catchment of the River Tame, showing locations of some features mentioned in the text

Location
- Country: England
- Counties: West Midlands, Warwickshire, Staffordshire
- Cities: Wolverhampton, Birmingham
- Towns: Oldbury, West Midlands, Tipton, Wednesbury, Willenhall, Walsall, Tamworth

Physical characteristics
- Source: Oldbury Arm
  - location: Titford, Oldbury
  - coordinates: 52.4863°N 2.0235°W
- 2nd source: Willenhall Arm
  - location: Willenhall, Walsall
  - coordinates: 52.5756°N 2.0922°W
- Mouth: Confluence with the River Trent
  - location: Alrewas, Staffordshire
  - coordinates: 52.7312°N 1.7173°W
- Length: 95 km (59 mi)
- Basin size: 1,500 km^{2} (580 sq mi)
- Discharge
  - location: Hopwas
  - average: 27.84 m^{3}/s (983 cu ft/s)
  - maximum: 435 m^{3}/s (15,400 cu ft/s)

Basin features
- Progression: Tame → Trent → Humber → North Sea
- Tributaries
  - left: Ford Brook, Full brook, Sneyd Brook, Plants Brook, Bourne Brook
  - right: Darlaston Brook, Rea, Blythe, Bourne, Anker

The River Tame is a river in the West Midlands of England, and one of the principal tributaries of the River Trent. The Tame is about 95 km (59 mi) long from the source at Oldbury to its confluence with the Trent near Alrewas, but the main river length of the entire catchment, i.e., the Tame and its main tributaries, is about 285 km (177 mi).

It forms part of the Severn-Trent flyway, a route used by migratory birds to cross Great Britain.

== Etymology ==
The name derives from the Celtic language, although it may have even earlier roots. It is usually thought to mean "dark", by analogy with the Sanskrit word tamas meaning darkness (cognate with "tamsus" in Lithuanian meaning "dark"). Other possibilities are "slow-moving" or "flowing", although the precise meaning is uncertain. The name is shared with the River Tame, Greater Manchester, and it is likely that the River Thame, the River Thames, the River Teme, the River Team, and the River Tamar all share the derivation.

== Historic significance ==
The Tame and its tributaries, extracted from John Speed's map of 1610

Birmingham and the parishes in the centre and north of the modern conurbation were probably colonised by the Tomsaete or Tomsæte ("Tame-dwellers"), an Anglian tribe living in the valley of the Tame and around Tamworth during the Kingdom of Mercia. They migrated up the valleys of the Trent and Tame from the Humber Estuary, and later formed Mercia.

== Course and catchment ==
The Tame is generally considered to have two main sources; Willenhall and Oldbury. The tributaries arising in these locations are generally known as the Willenhall arm and the Oldbury arm of the Tame. However, some of its tributary streams, including Waddens Brook, rise as far to the west and north as Bilston and Wednesfield in the city of Wolverhampton. Much of the course of the river has been modified over the centuries, and the urban sections now run mainly through culverts or canalised channels. Both arms of the Tame flow through the Black Country to their confluence at Bescot, on the edge of Walsall.

=== The Willenhall or Wolverhampton arm ===
The northern arm is easily traced from Bentley, near Willenhall. However, the SMURF project traces it back as far as a section known as Rusty Brook in Stow Heath, near Bilston, where it is marked by a marshy patch at the northern end of the City of Wolverhampton College's Wellington Road campus; hence, SMURF (Sustainable Management of Urban Rivers and Floodplains) uses the term "Wolverhampton arm" for this section of the Tame. Victorian Ordnance Survey maps trace the sources of the Tame further back, to the site of the old Stow Heath colliery, which is now Wolverhampton's East Park.

The stream runs invisibly but generally north-eastward through Stowlawn, and then cuts across the southern edge of Willenhall, appearing briefly among the warehouses, and picking up reinforcement from the Waddens Brook, which originates in Wednesfield. It appears definitively at Watery Lane and Noose Lane, even more so at Bentley, where it runs southward through the industrial part of Bentley, before turning south-eastward, following a realigned course alongside and beneath the M6 motorway, to Bescot.

The Willenhall or Woverhampton arm

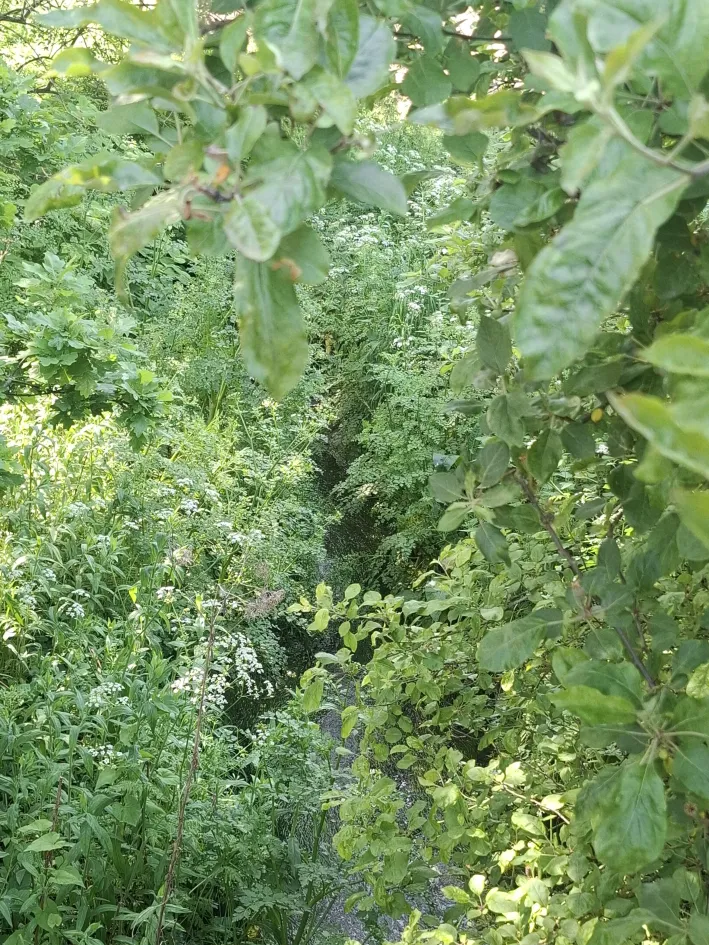
The Willenhall Arm visible along School Street, Willenhall, roughly 180 metres (590 ft) northwest of the confluence with the Waddens Brook

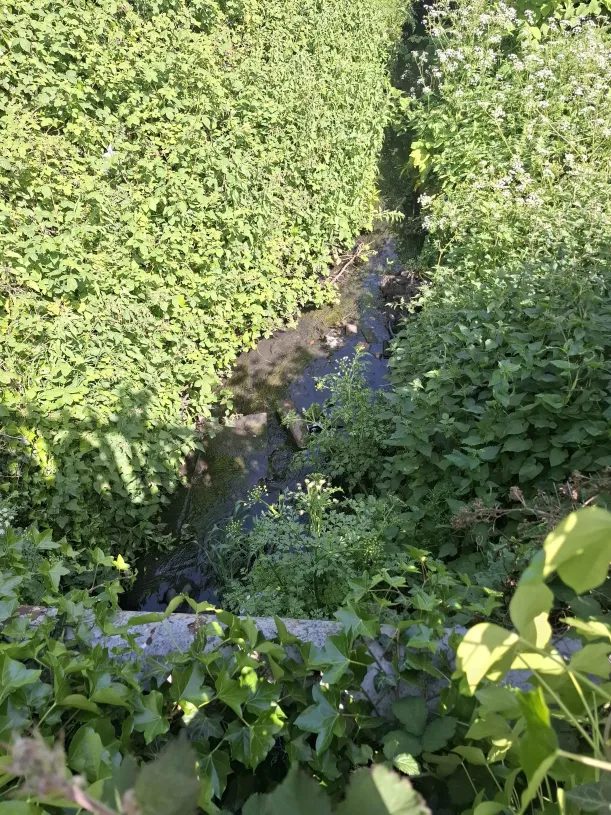
The Willenhall Arm still along School Street

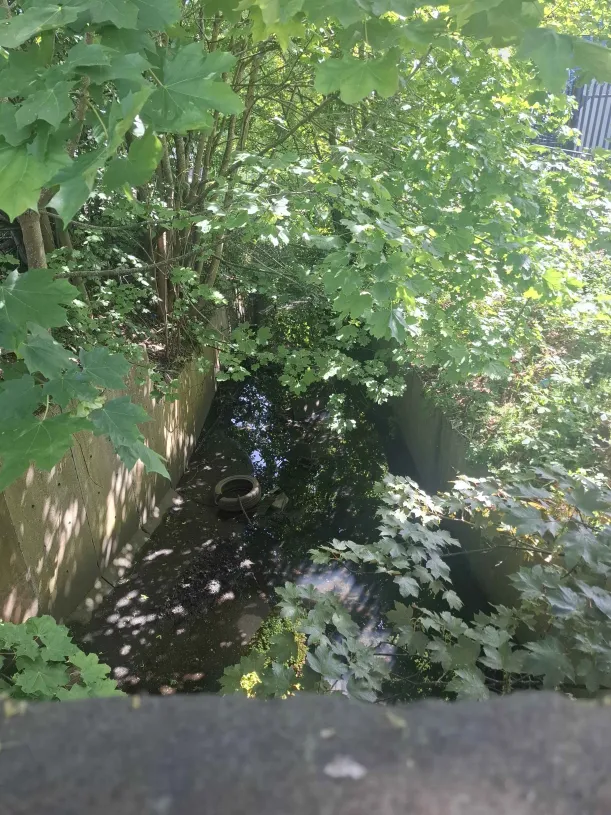
The Willenhall Arm along Somerford Place, Willenhall

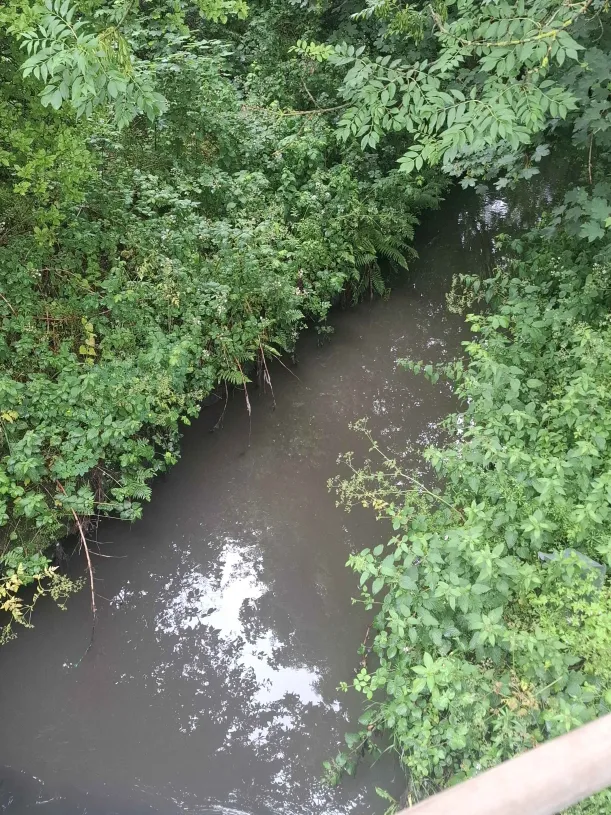
Along West Acre, this is the last time the River Tame is visible in Willenhall before it reaches Shepwell Green

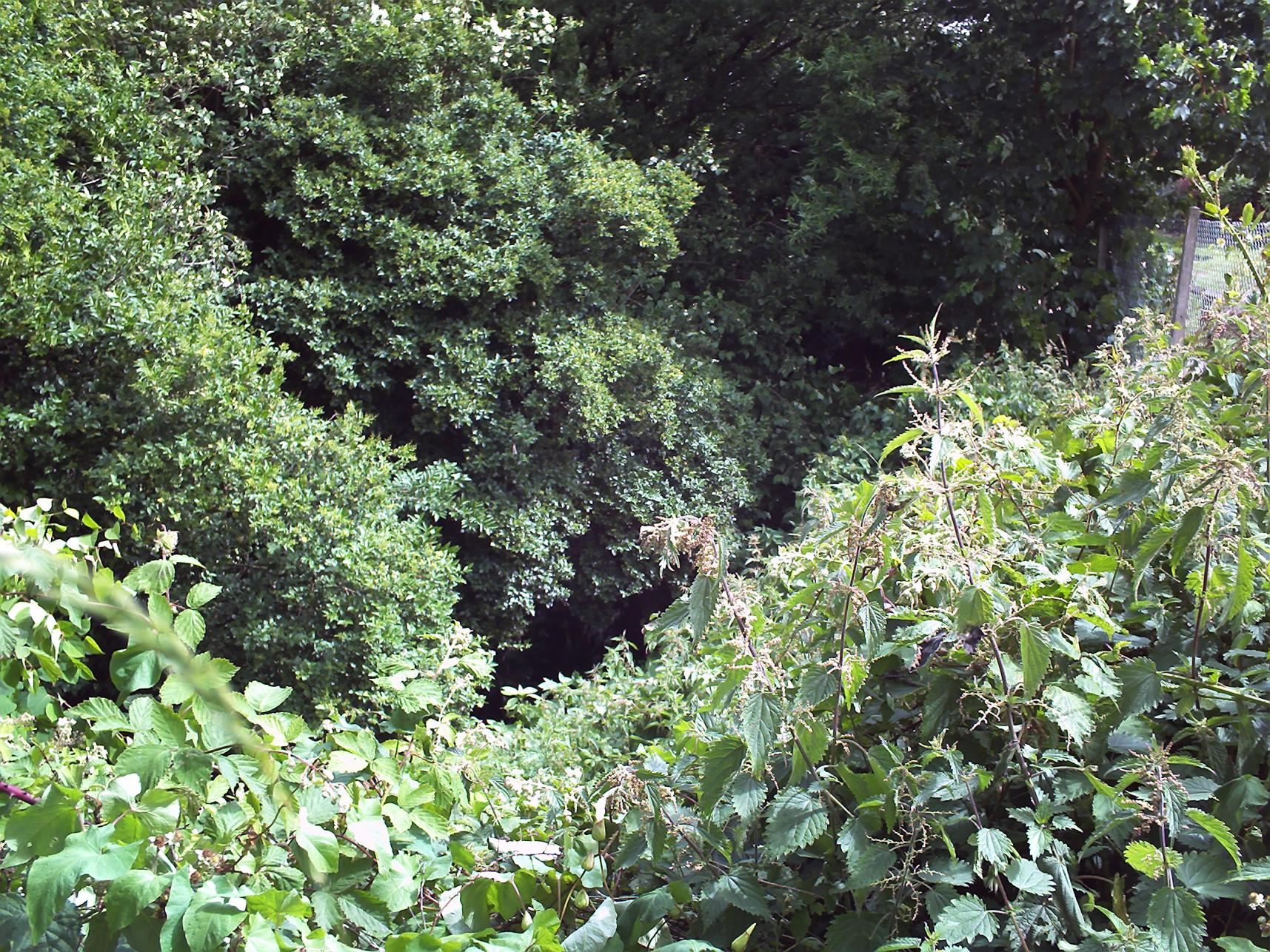
The Willenhall Arm, close to the source, among residential areas near Shepwell Green. The river is disclosed by the tiny area of reflection in the centre of the photograph - a small stream between overgrown banks, and almost inaccessible, although it forms the town's boundary.

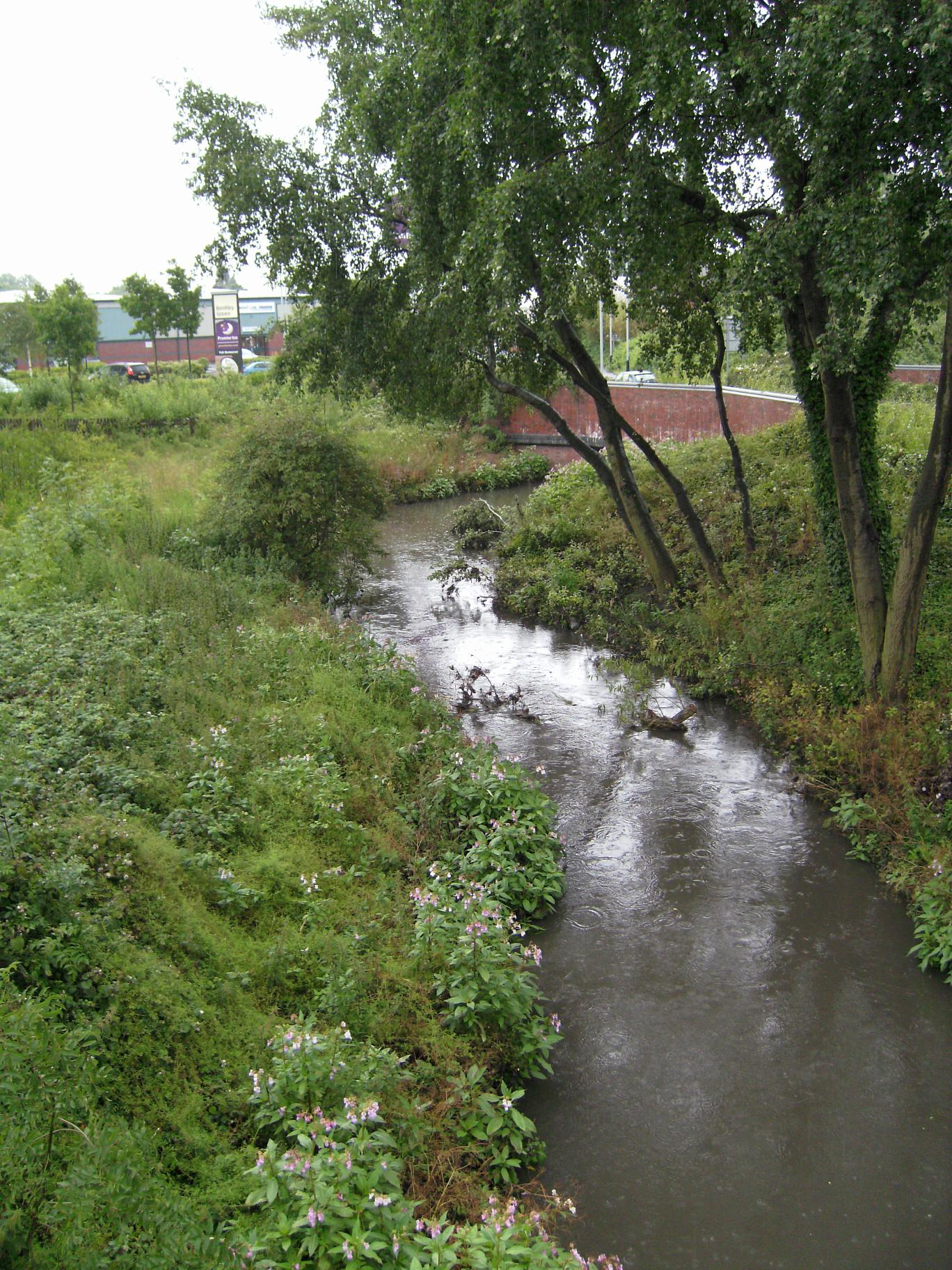
The Willenhall Arm at Bentley Green, Walsall, just after passing under the Black Country Route. Despite the appearance at this point it here enters an area of heavy industry.

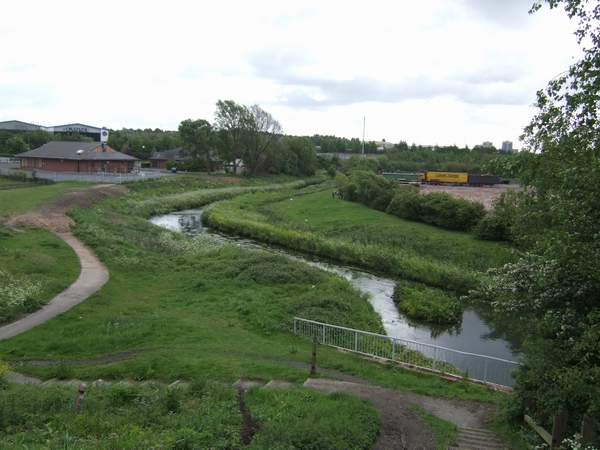
The Willenhall branch south of the Anson Branch Canal, near the Bentley Mill entertainment and retail area.

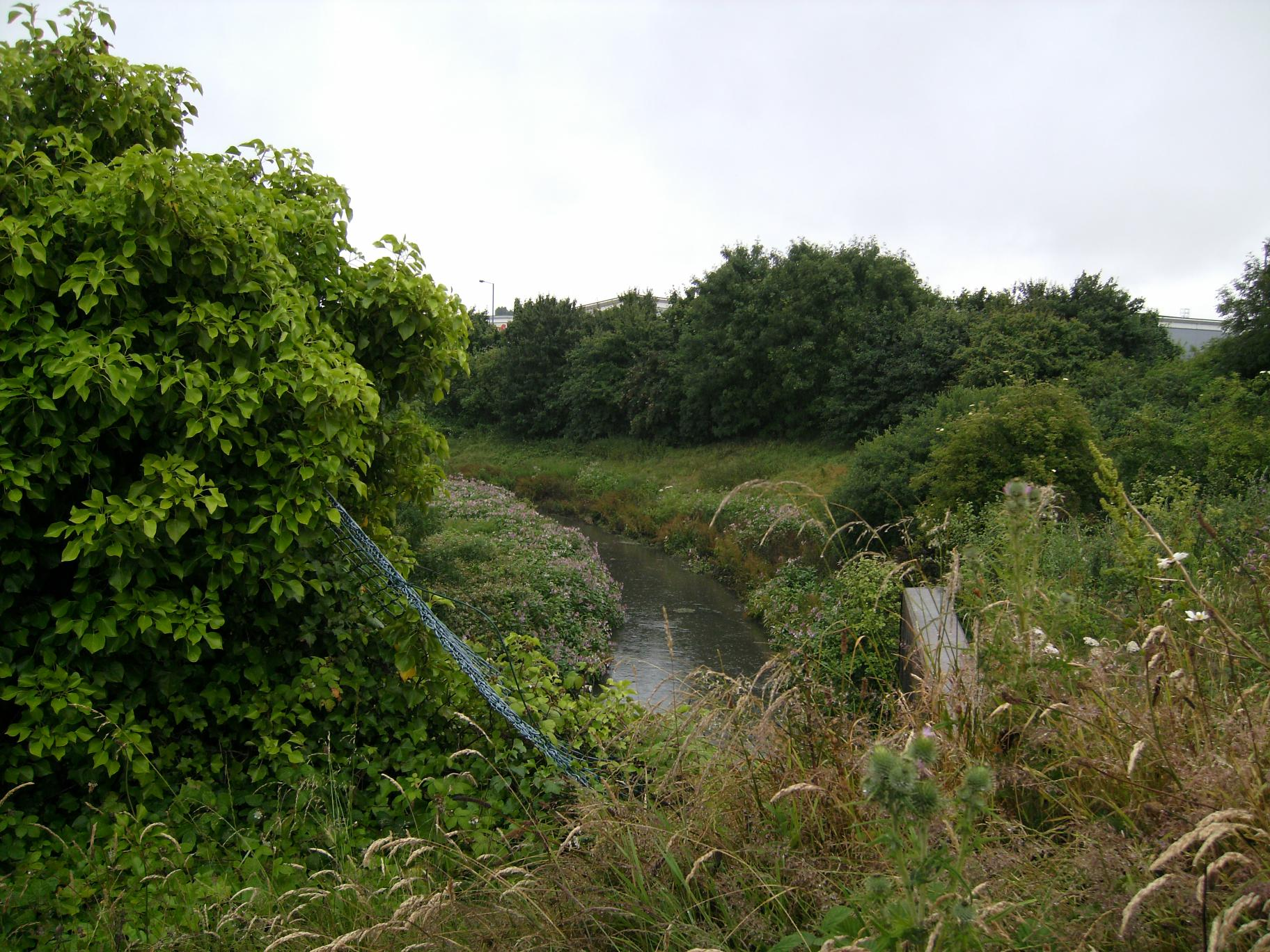
The Willenhall Arm passes a large retail development at Axletree Way, Wednesbury, formerly a heavy industrial site. The Tame is completely screened from the road and pedestrian ways at this point, though only a few metres away.

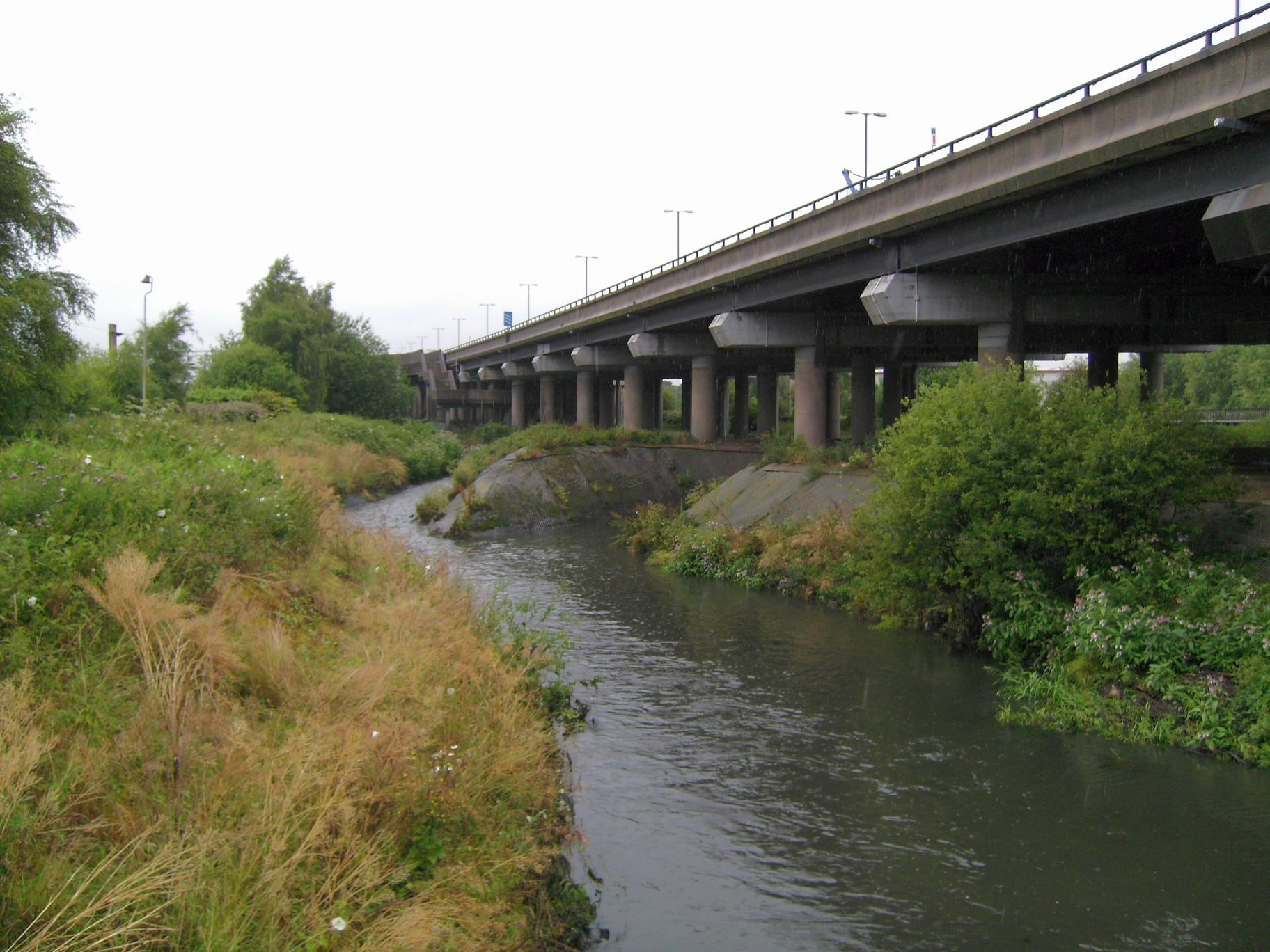
Confluence of the Oldbury Arm (left) and the Willenhall Arm (right), close to Bescot Stadium railway station, under the M6 Motorway.

=== The Oldbury arm ===
The southern arm appears prominently close to Oldbury town centre, which gives it its name, but can be traced back to an industrial area at Titford, just west of the M5 motorway, between Whiteheath and Langley Green. It winds its way up through Langley and around the southern and eastern edges of Oldbury town centre, surfacing due south of Sandwell & Dudley railway station, from which point it remains mainly on the surface and is easily traced. Bearing generally north-westward, it skirts Brades Village and flows into Tipton. Here it passes through Sheepwash Urban Park and Horseley Heath to the centre of Great Bridge. Leaving Tipton, it then zig-zags across the southern and eastern parts of Wednesbury, to meet the Willenhall or Wolverhampton arm at Bescot.

The Oldbury arm

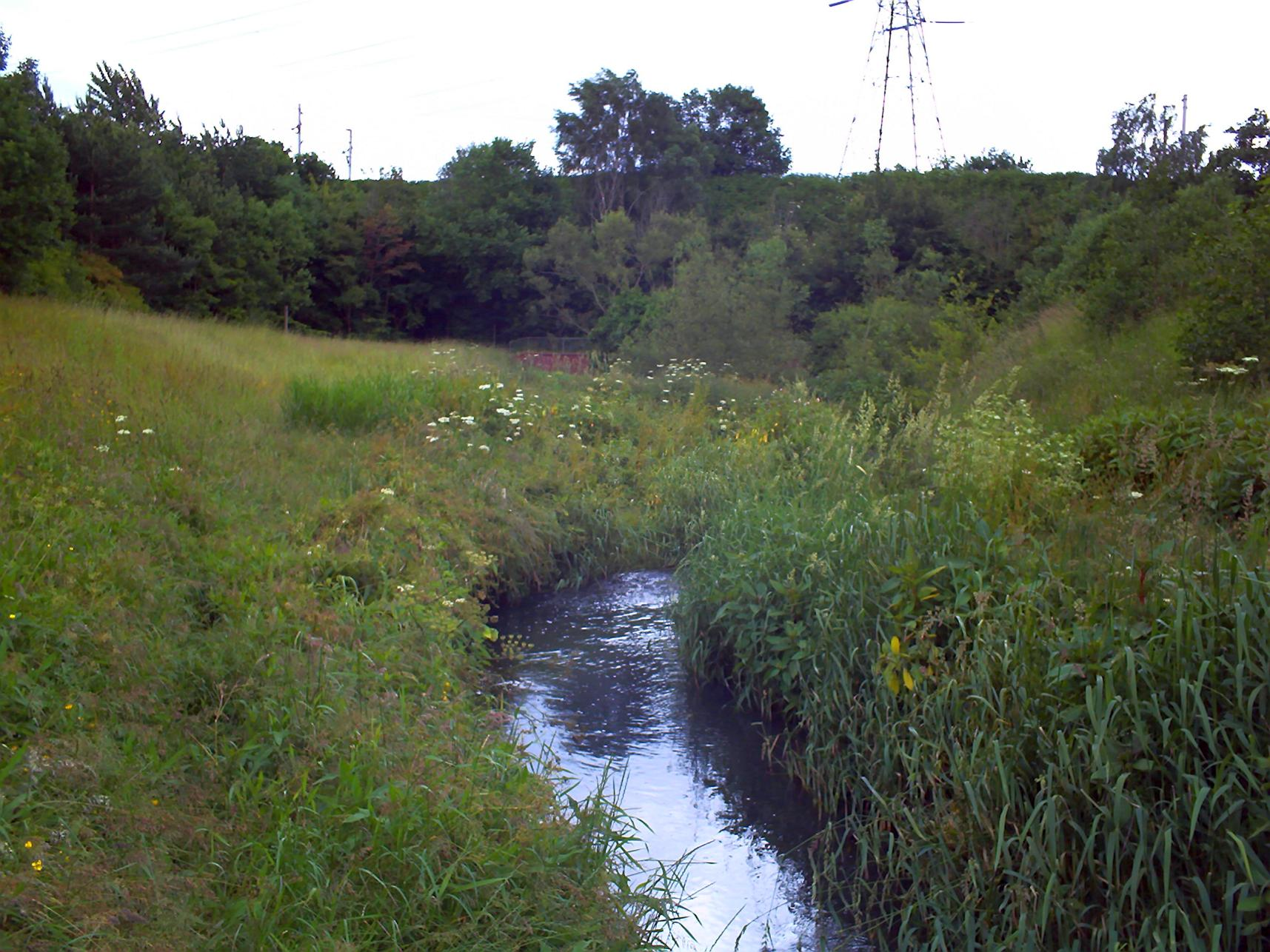
The Oldbury Arm of the Tame, close to where it enters Sheepwash Urban Park, via a culvert under the West Coast Main Line.

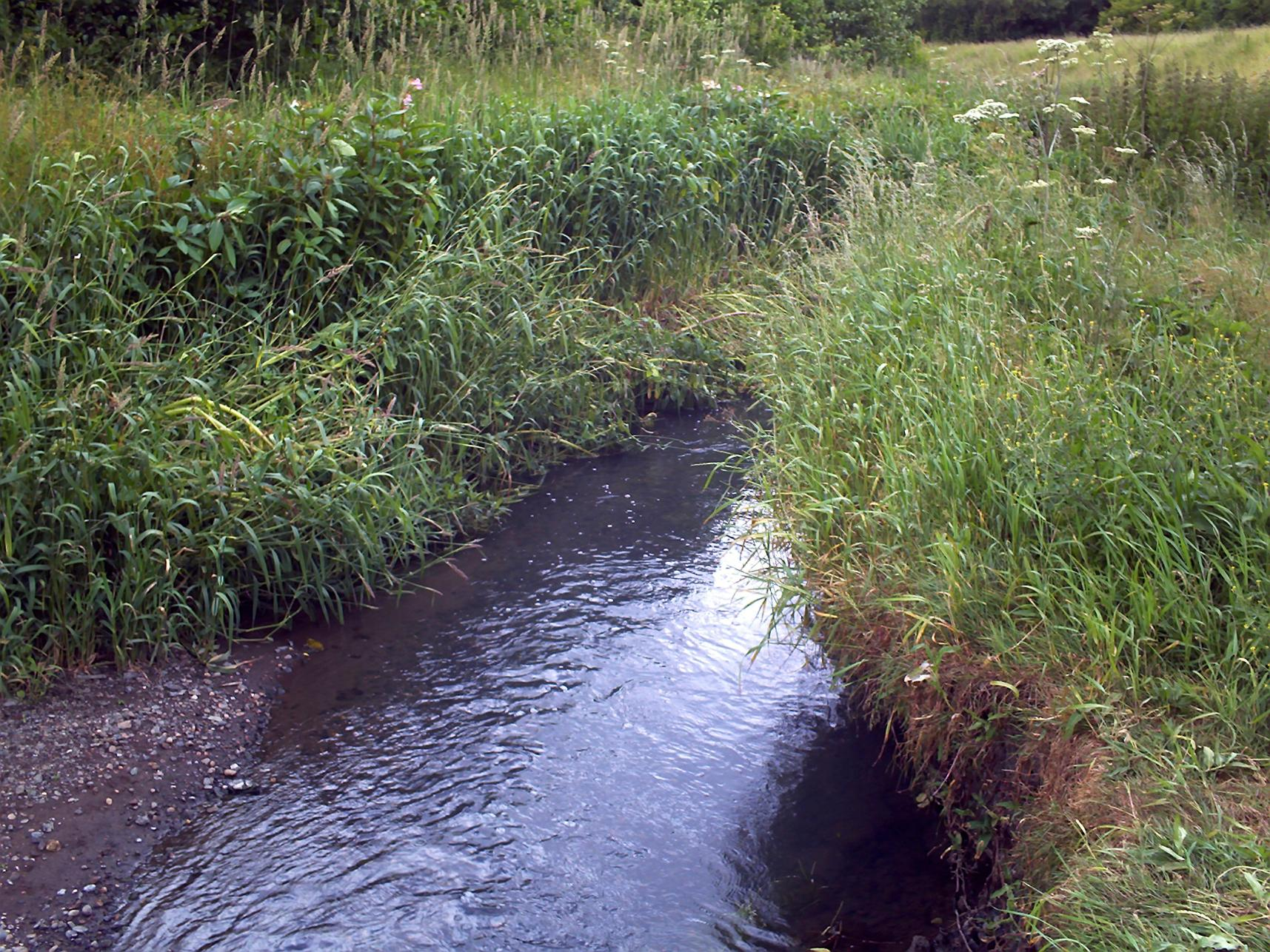
Oldbury Arm of the Tame close to its entrance to the Sheepwash Urban Park, between Great Bridge, Tipton, and West Bromwich. At this point it is still only 1–2 metres wide if not in flood.

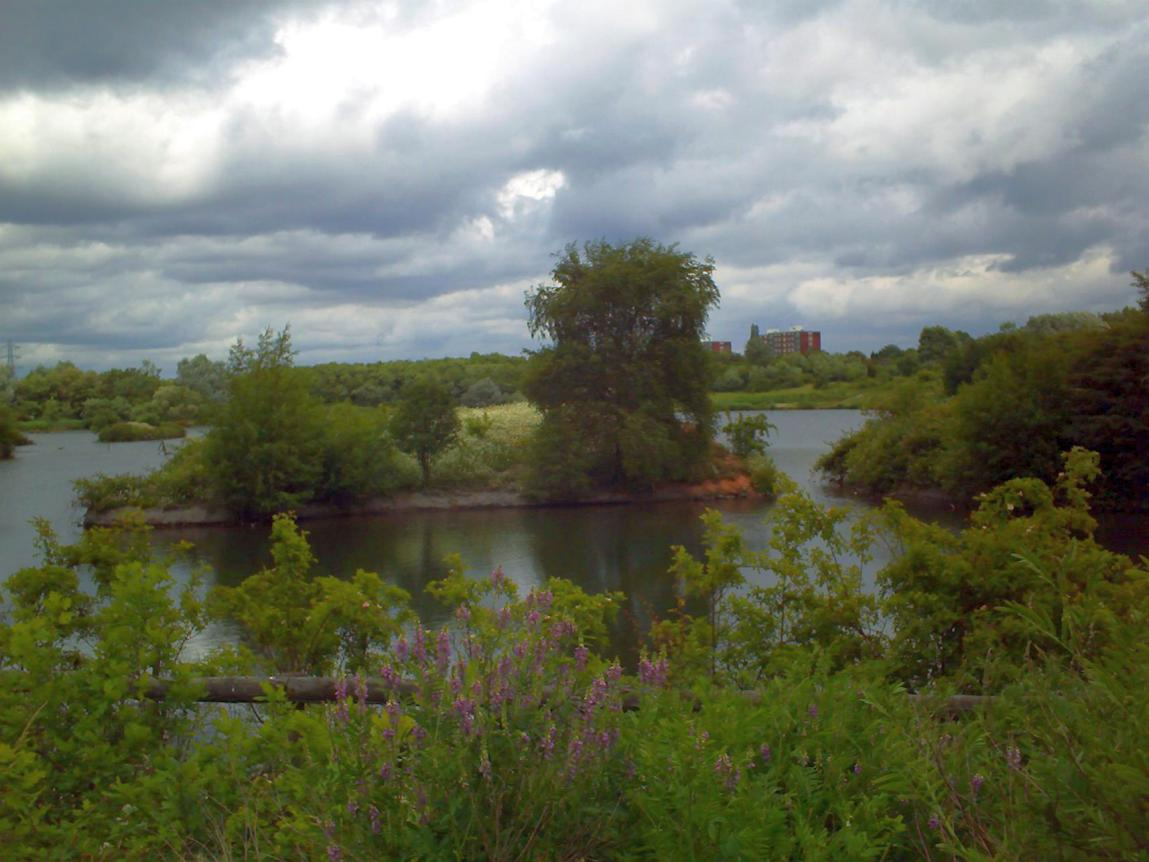
Largest of the lakes in Sheepwash Urban Park. This is a storm water retention basin, fed by the Oldbury Arm, providing an important urban habitat.

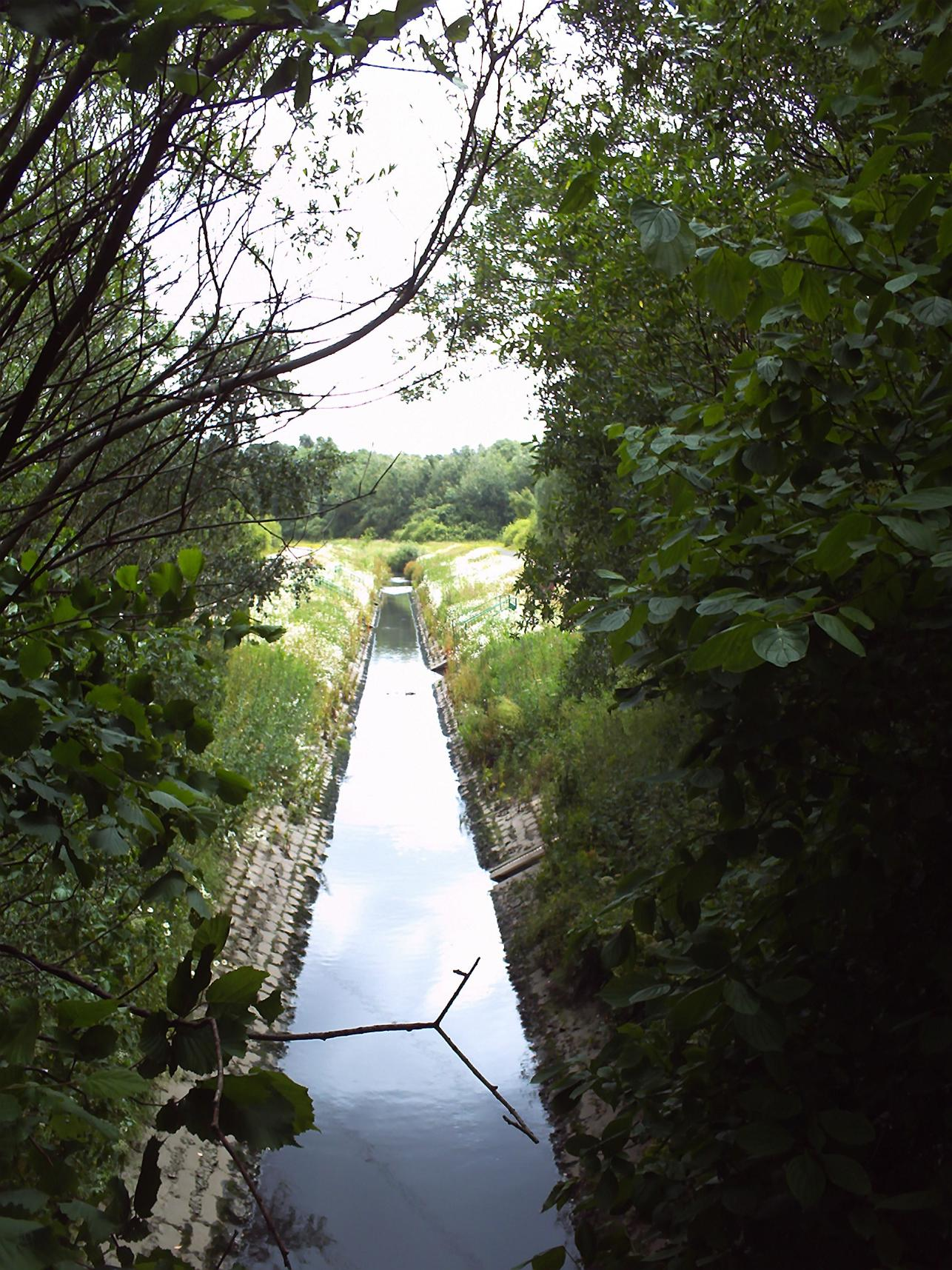
Canalised channel of the Tame. Sluices feeding the Sheepwash lakes are visible on both sides.

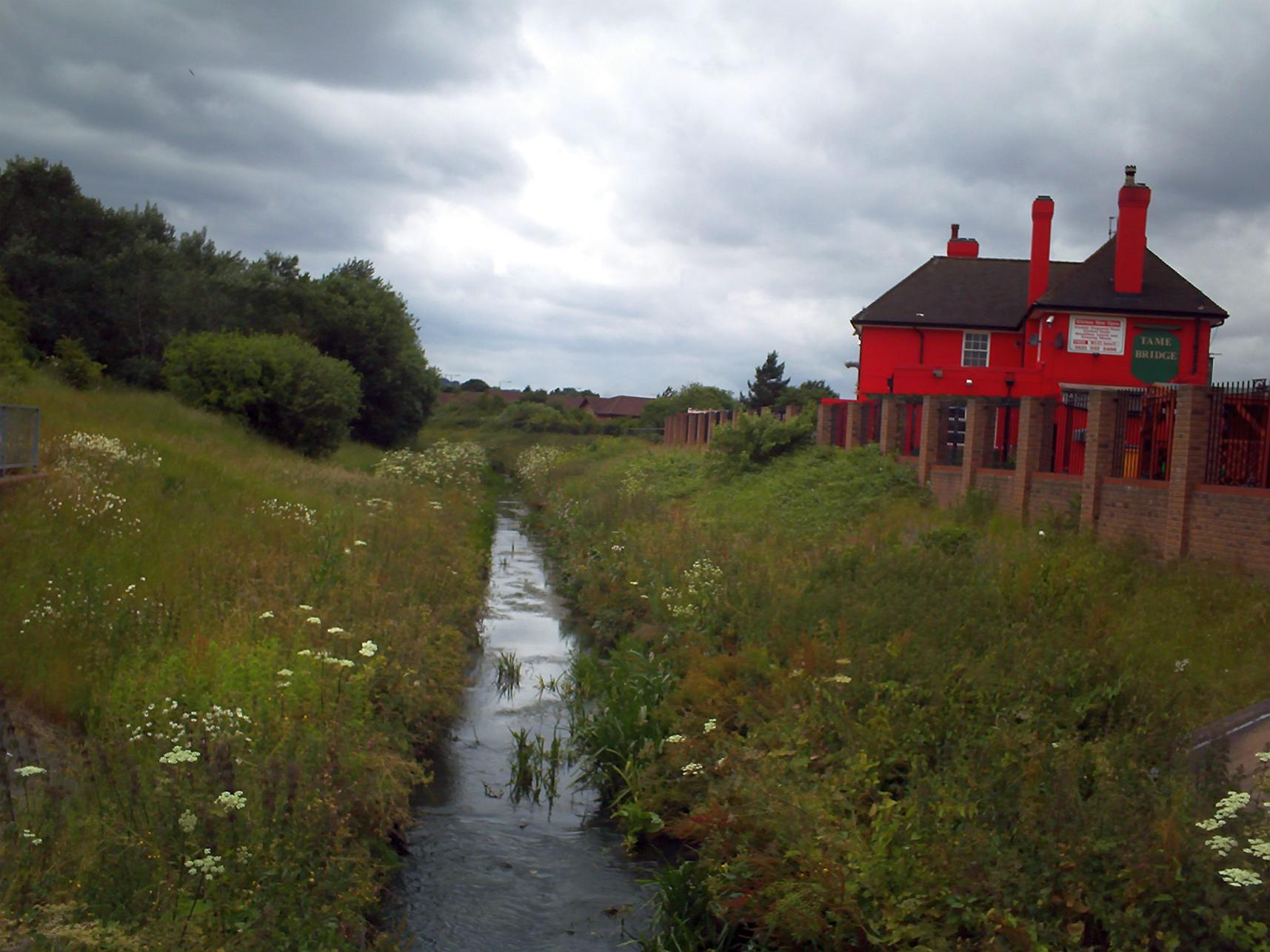
The Oldbury Arm at Tame Bridge, just south of Great Bridge.

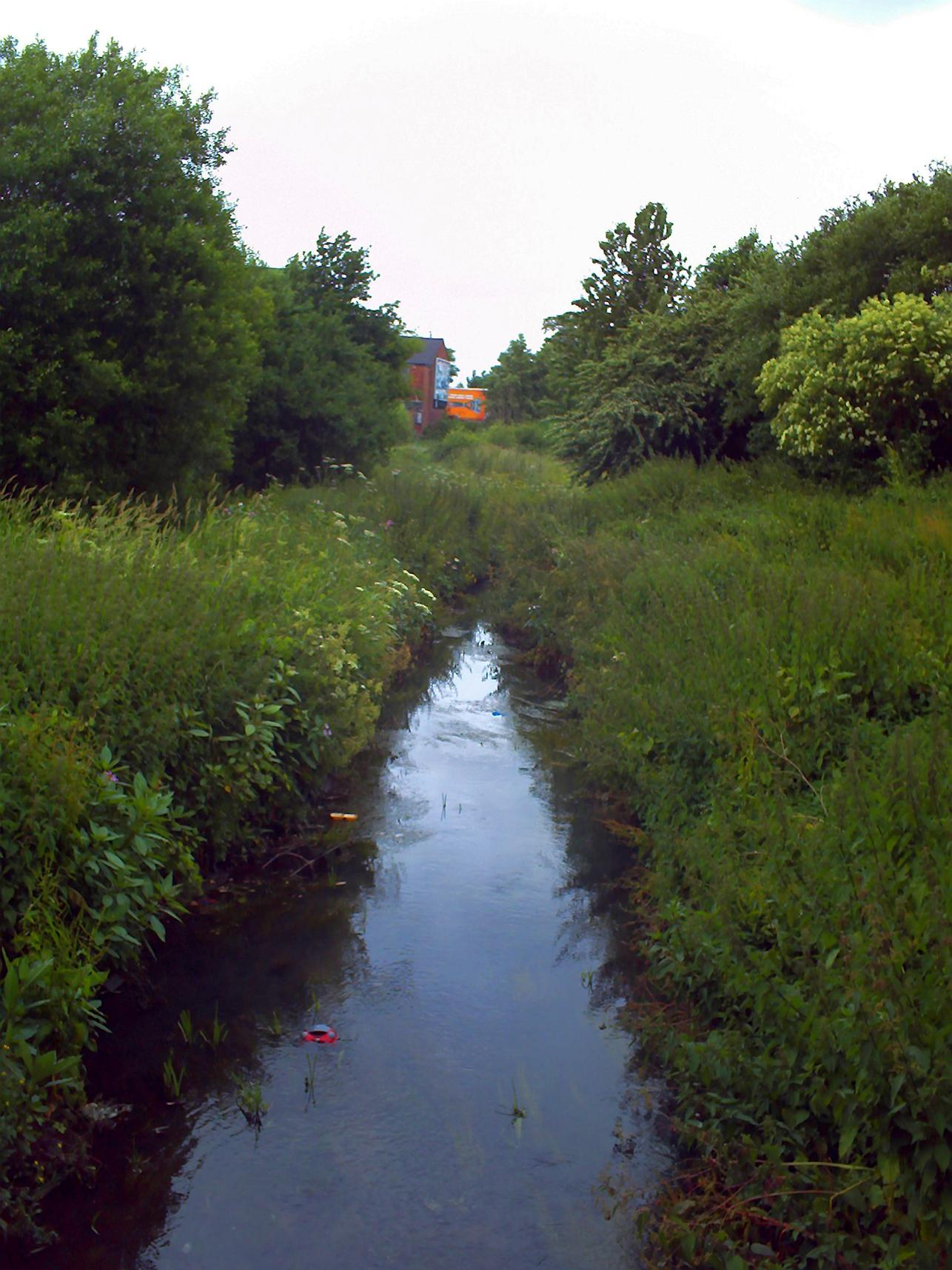
Steadily widening, the Oldbury Arm approaches Great Bridge.

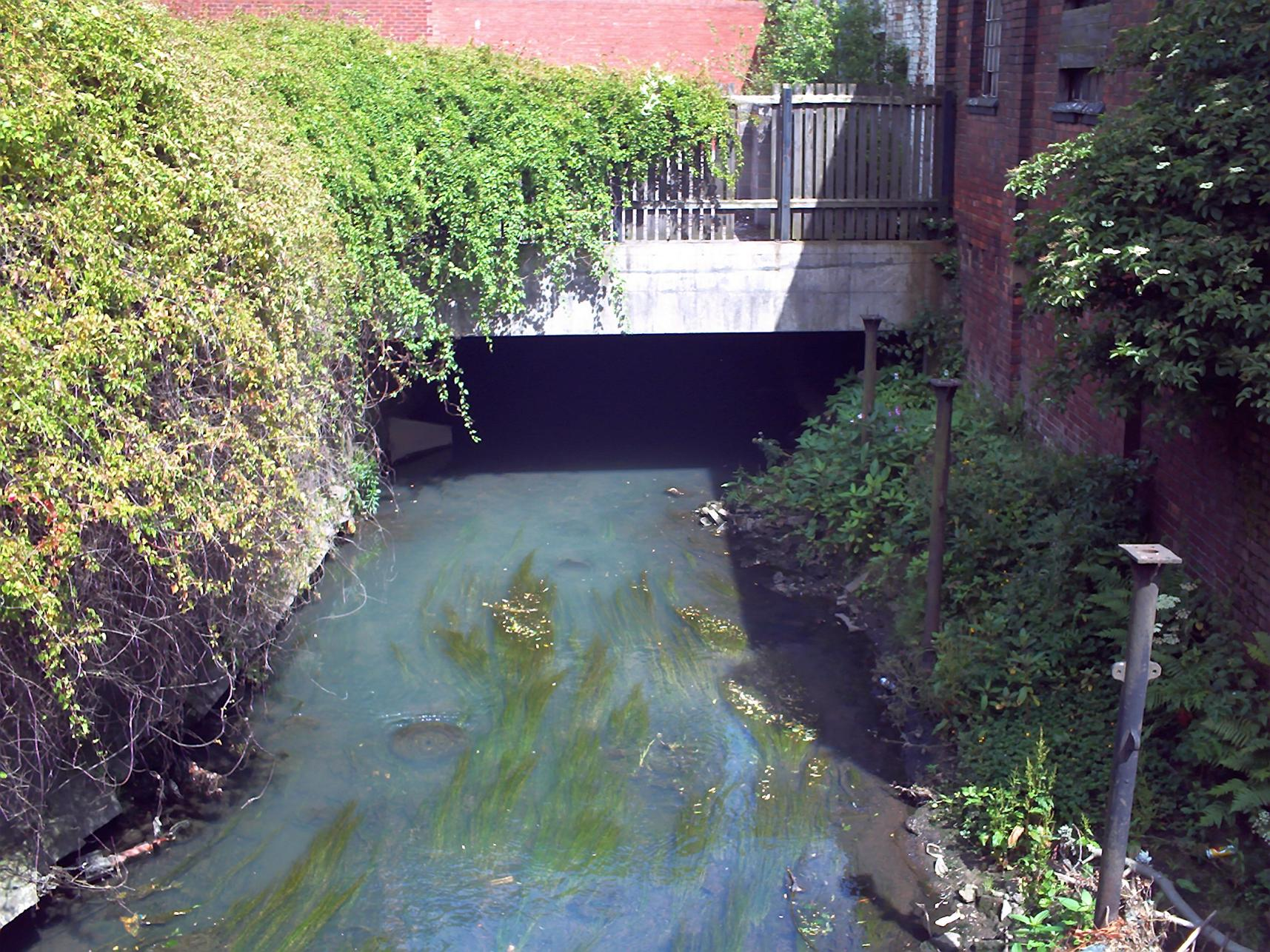
The Oldbury Arm near Hill Top, Wednesbury. This section is heavily industrial, with very little public access, and the river often passing under warehouses and factories.

=== The Main Stream ===
The unified Tame then flows—partly through channels realigned to make way for the M6 motorway and its interchange with the M5—through Sandwell Valley and into north Birmingham. It passes through Hamstead and Perry Hall Park to Perry Barr, where it is crossed by the Perry Bridge of 1711, then through Witton and beneath both Gravelly Hill Interchange (where it is fed by the Rea) and Bromford Viaduct, to Washwood Heath.

Confluence to Sandwell Valley

Confluence with Full Brook at Bescot

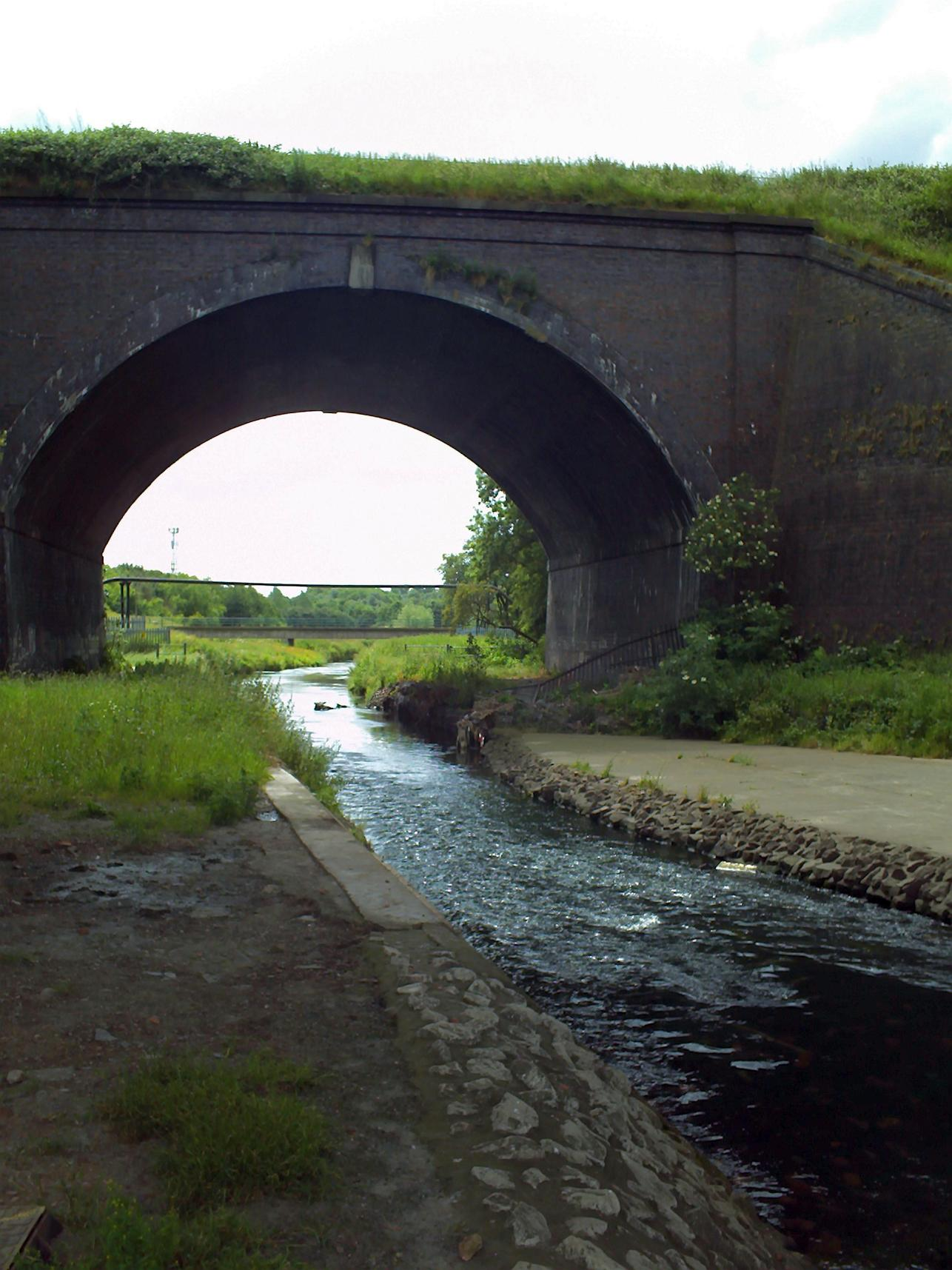
Aqueduct carrying the Tame Valley Canal over the River Tame at Ray Hall.

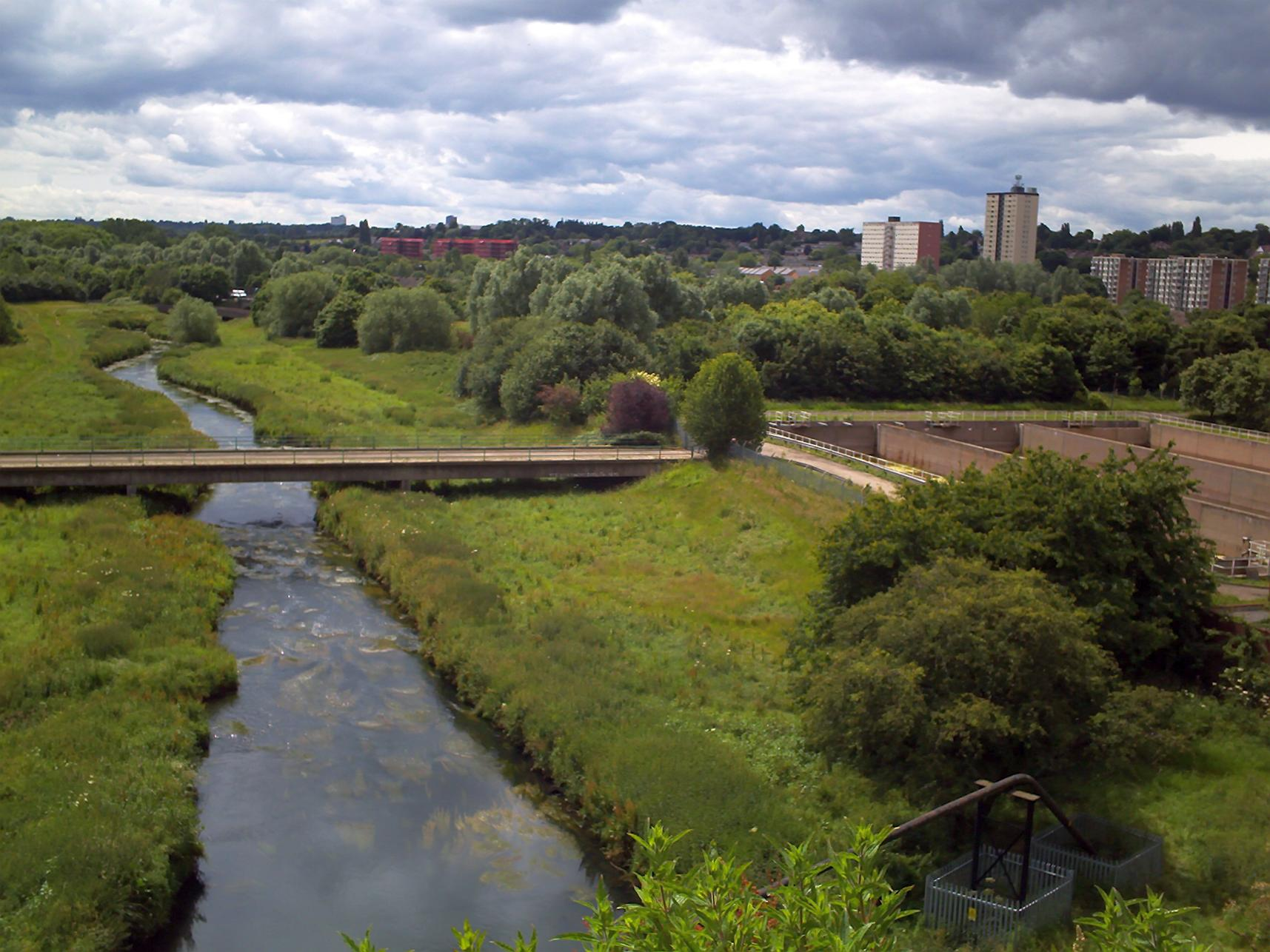
The Tame at Ray Hall sewage works, from the Tame Valley Canal aqueduct, with the Charlemont area of West Bromwich on the right.

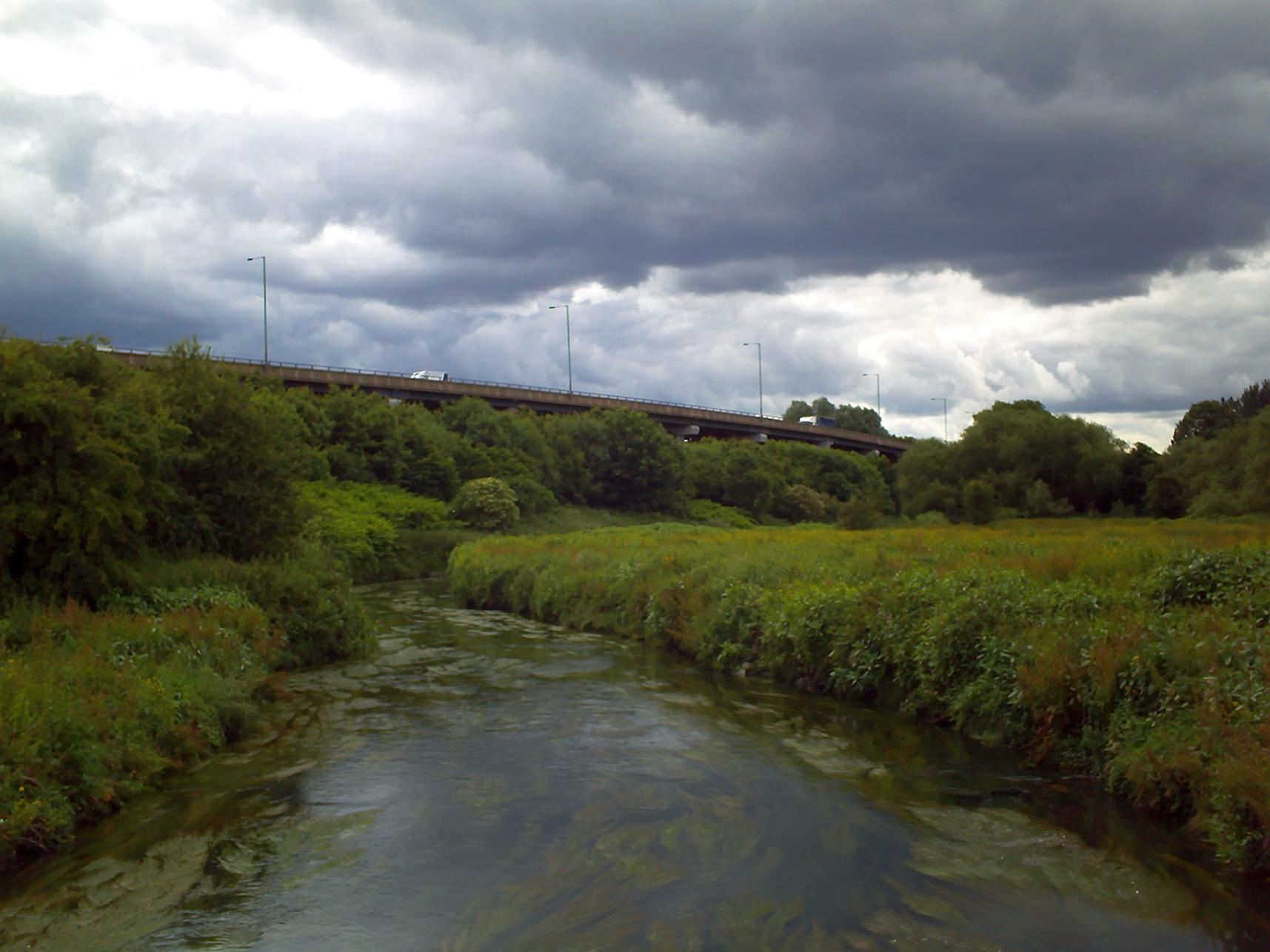
The Tame flowing under the M5 motorway interchange with the M6 motorway northbound, after which it enters Sandwell Valley.

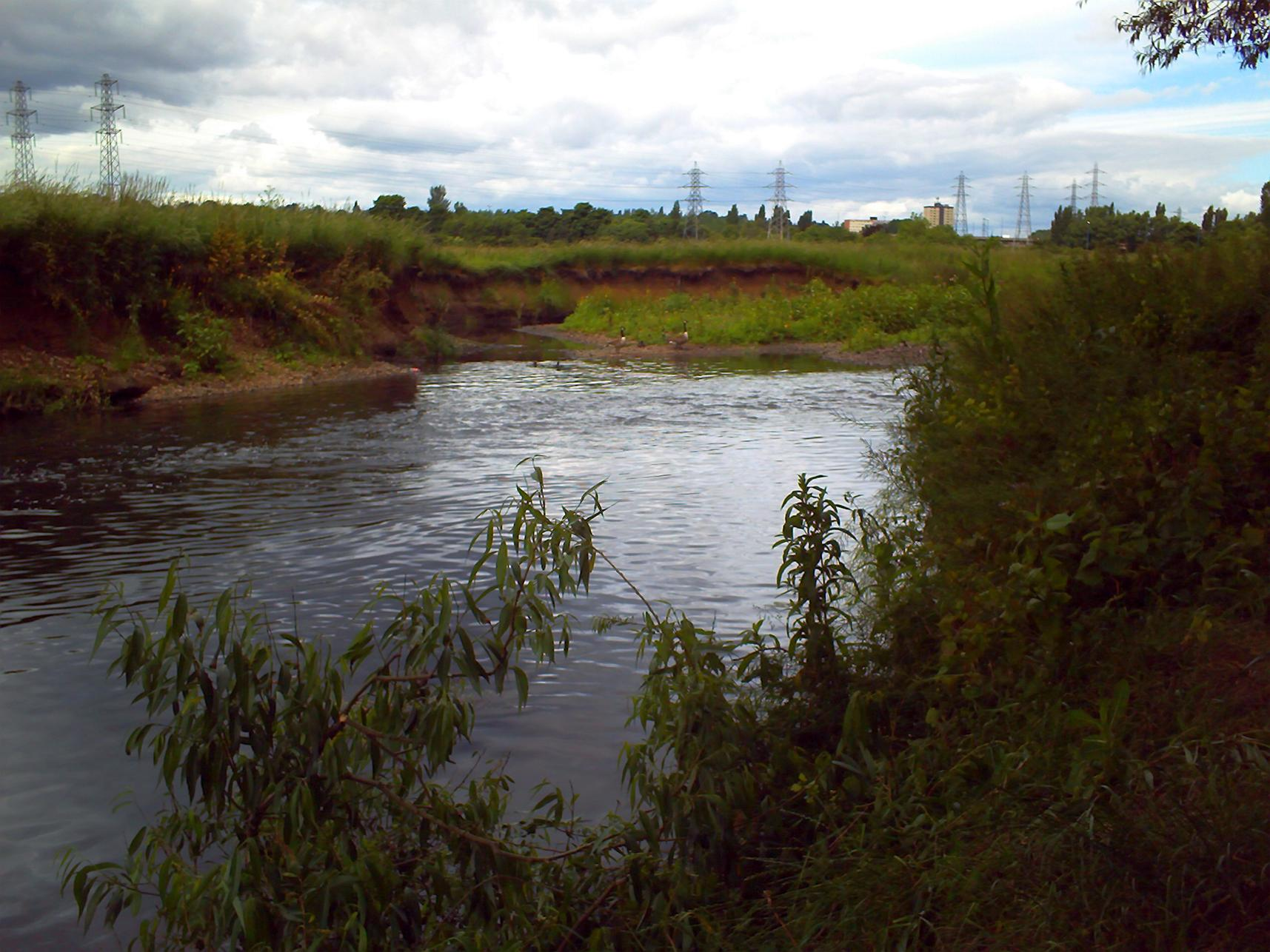
Steep, eroded banks of the Tame in upper part of Sandwell Valley.

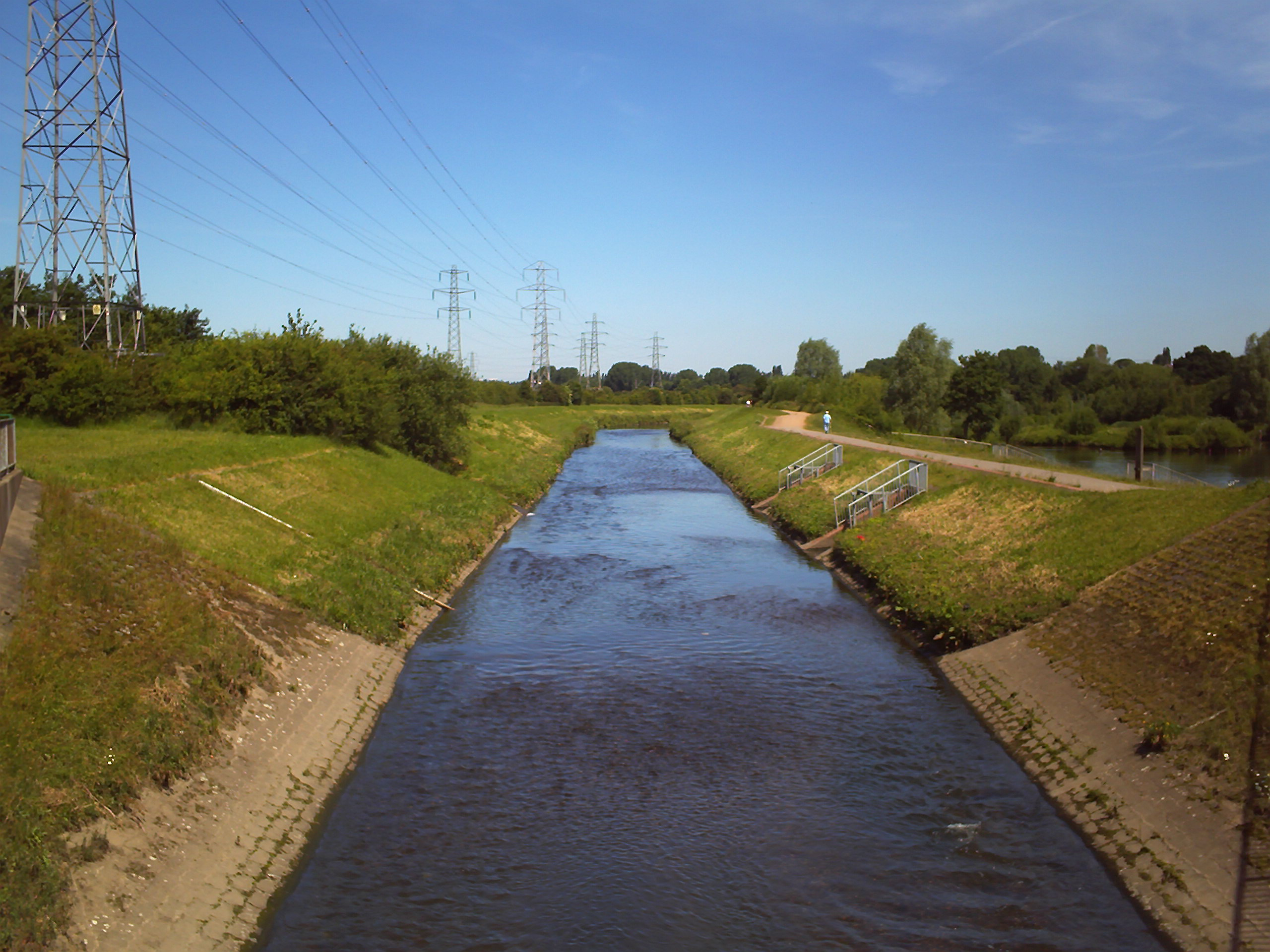
A canalised section of the Tame in Sandwell Valley, showing Forge Mill Lake to the right, separated from the river by a steep embankment.

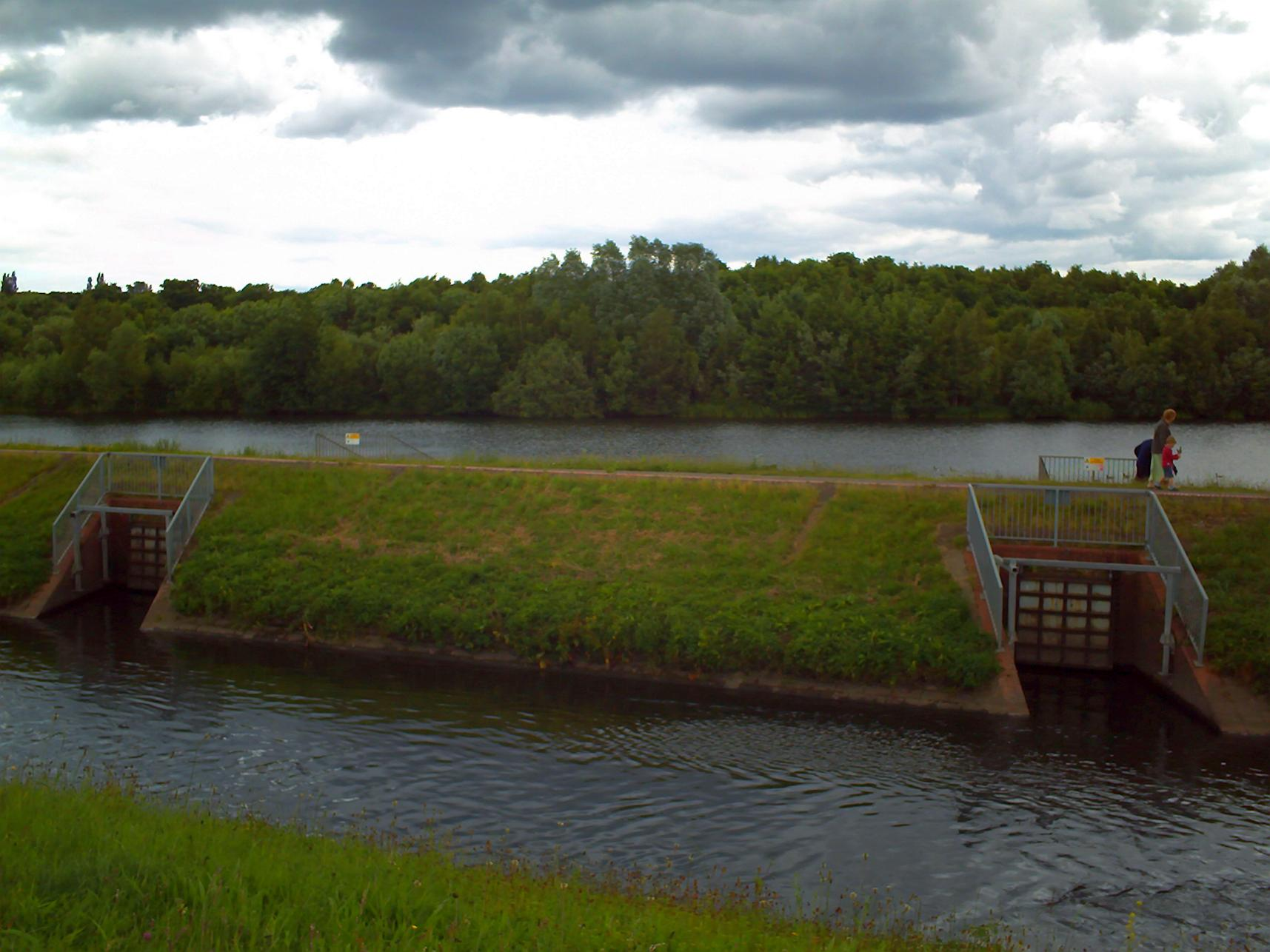
Sluices controlling the flow of water into Forge Mill Lake, a storm water retention basin.

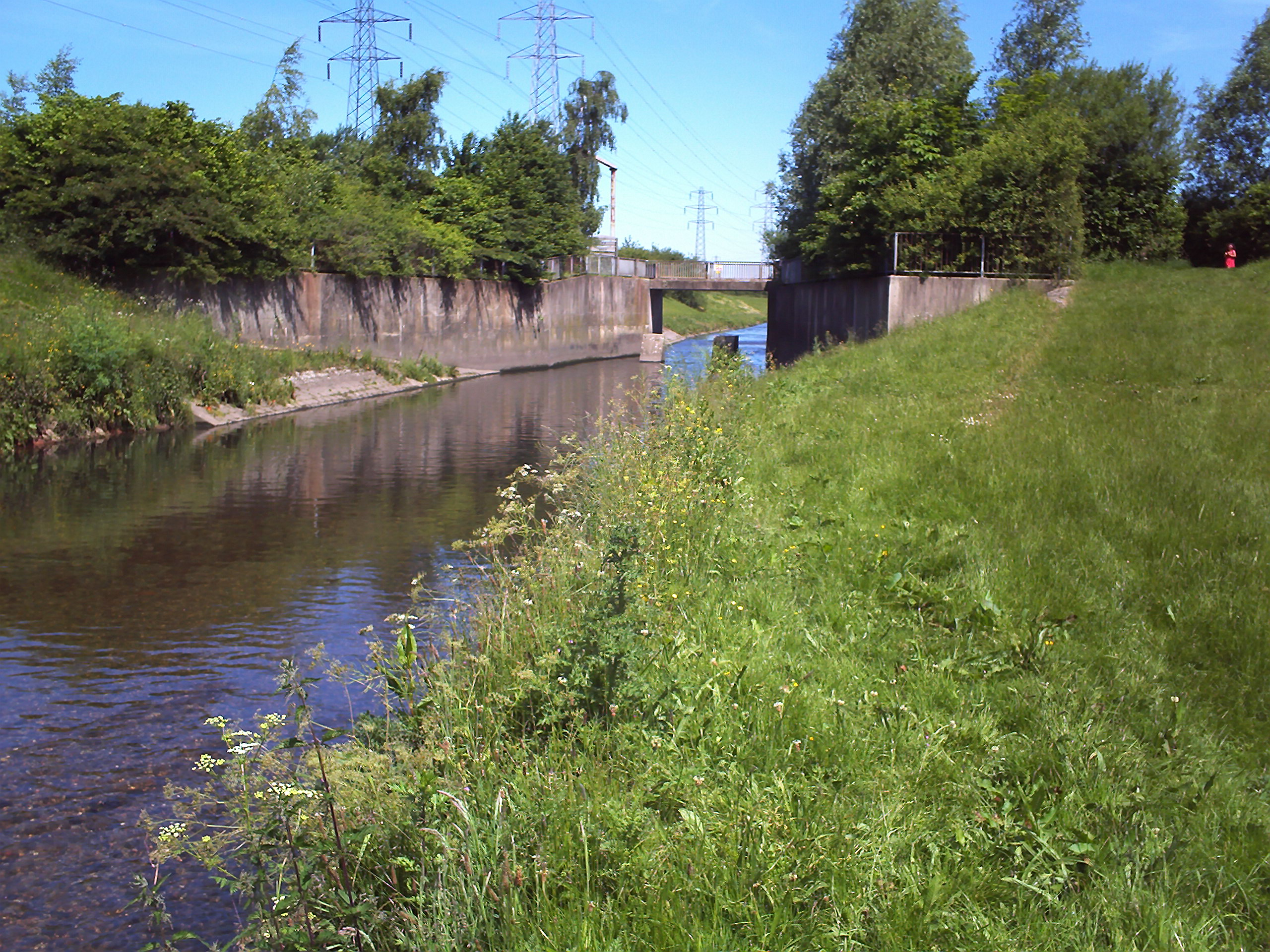
Bridge over the canalised section, linking the lake to Forge Mill Farm

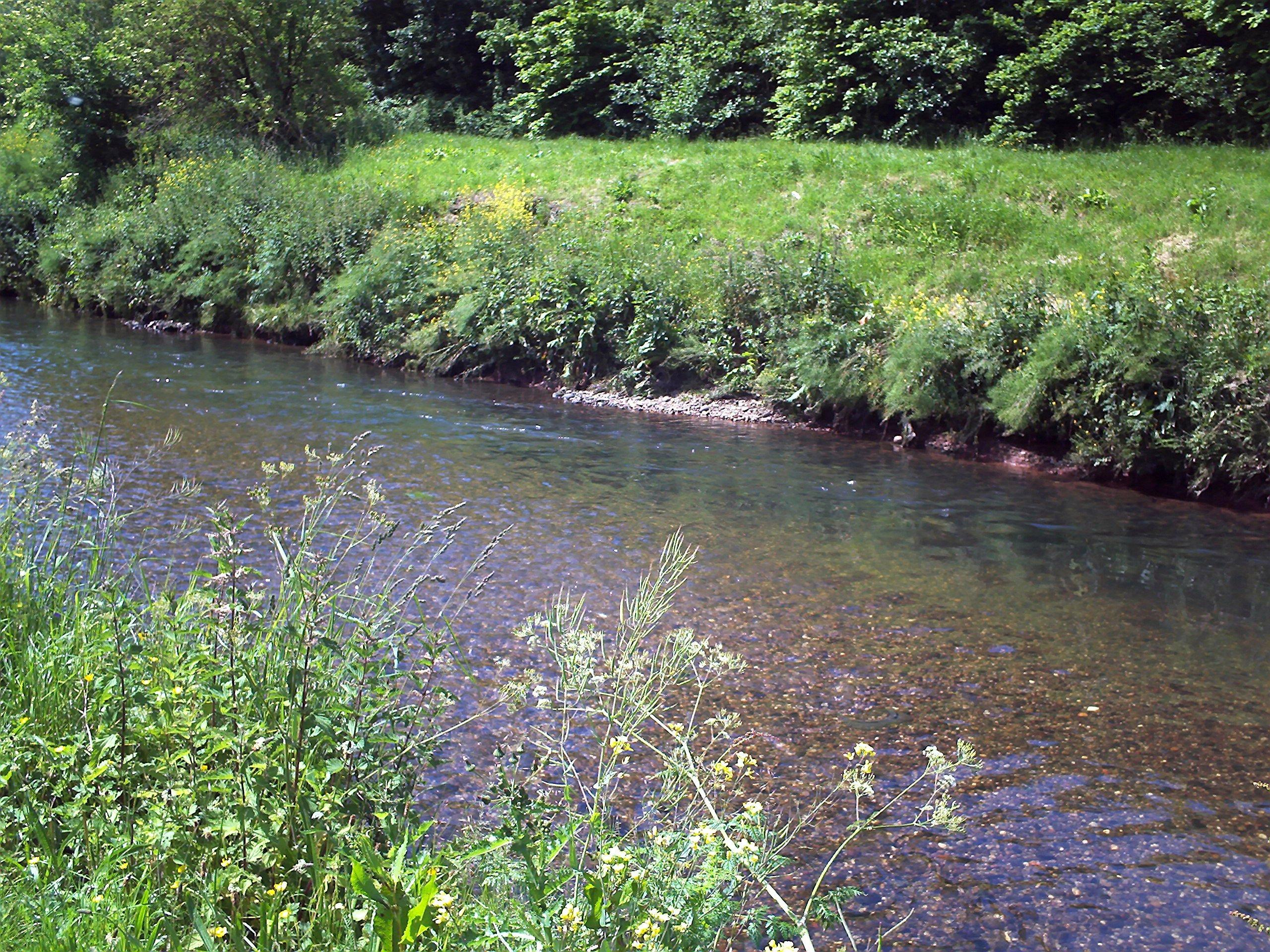
Bed and banks of the river, which is usually shallow and fast-flowing at this point.

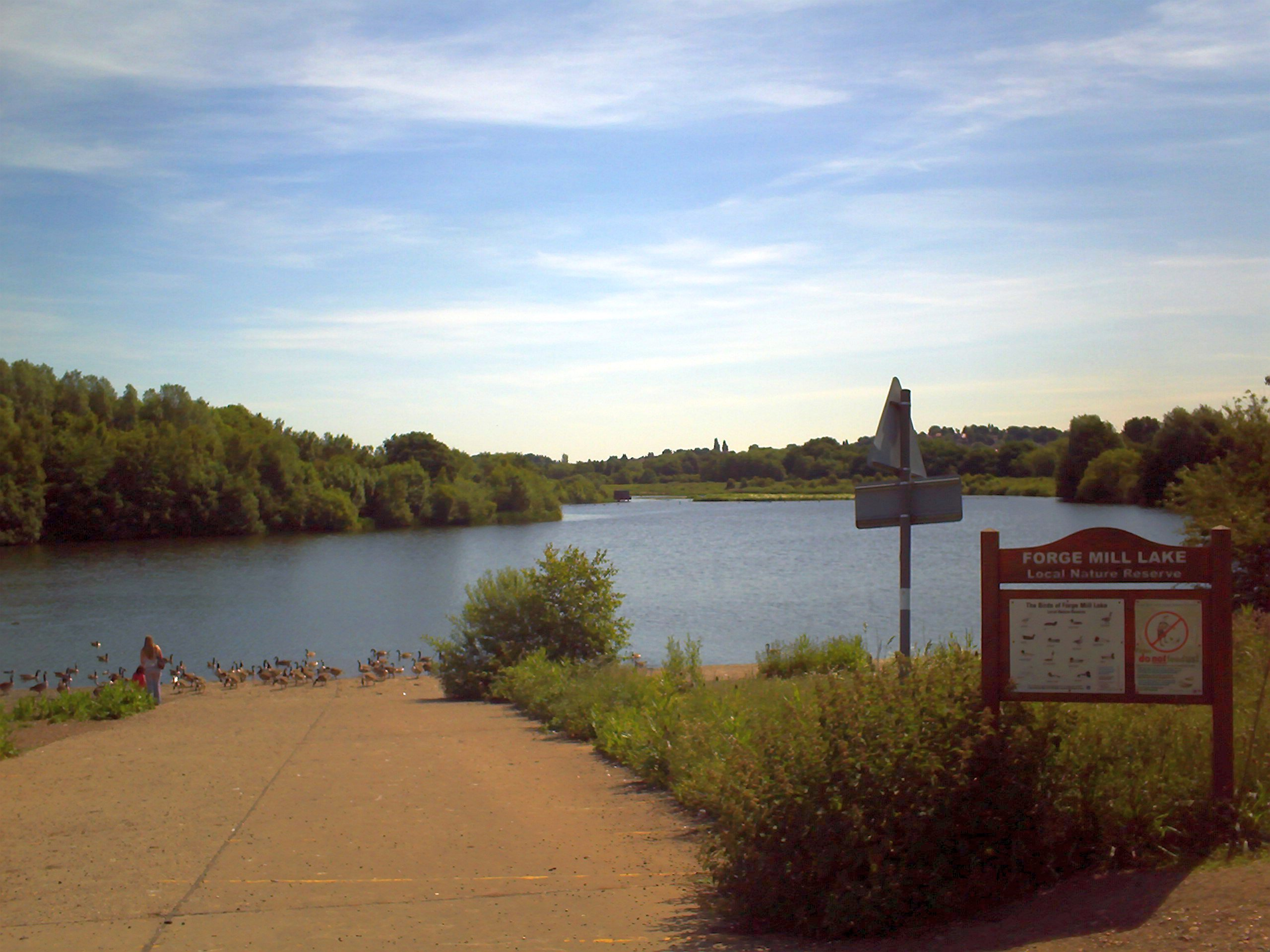
Forge Mill Lake. The RSPB reserve's bird hide is visible across the lake, in the centre of the photograph.

Skirting to the north of Castle Bromwich, it leaves Birmingham to the north-east at Park Hall Nature Reserve, passing Water Orton in Warwickshire. At Hams Hall, immediately after its confluence with the River Blythe and the little River Bourne, it turns sharply to take up a northward course, and soon feeds into the large complex of water purification lakes at Lea Marston and then Kingsbury Water Park. It then crosses into Staffordshire, flowing through Middleton Lakes RSPB reserve in a wide valley between Drayton Bassett to the west and Dosthill to the east. It then flows under Watling Street to the east of Fazeley, and under an aqueduct carrying the Coventry Canal. It continues northward to Tamworth, which takes its name from the river, where it is joined by the River Anker immediately to the east of Lady Bridge beneath the strategically positioned Tamworth Castle. The river continues its generally northward route past Hopwas, Comberford and Elford until it arrives at the National Memorial Arboretum where it forms the boundary between this and the Croxall Lakes Nature Reserve. After this, it flows under the railway at Wichnor Viaduct to its confluence with the Trent near Alrewas. The eventual outflow is into the North Sea, via the Humber Estuary. When the Tame and Trent meet, the Tame is the bigger river, the Trent effectively joining it as a tributary. However, the Trent being the longer river at that point is considered the more senior, and so the combined river bears its name.

The Lower Tame in Staffordshire

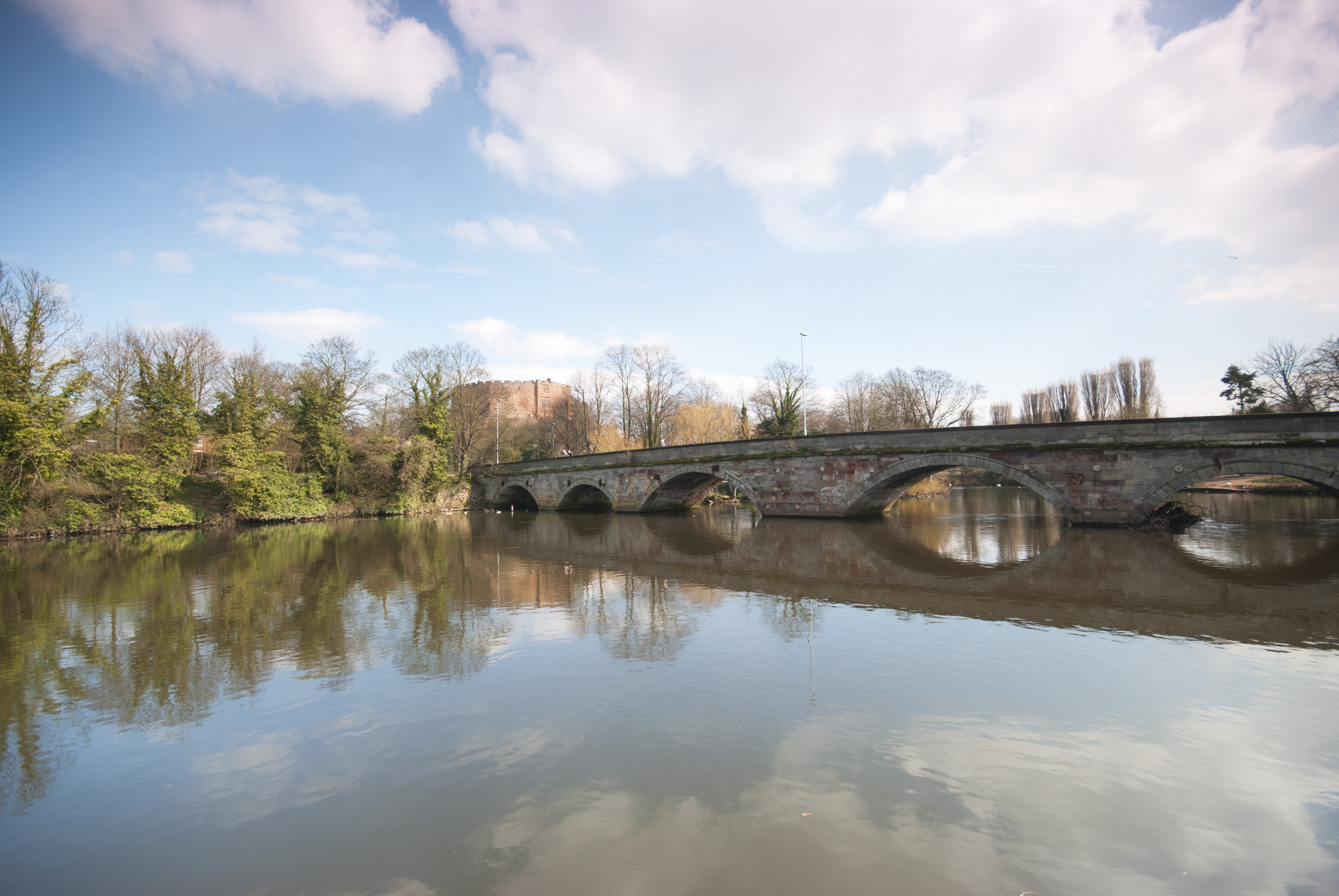
The Tame at Tamworth, with Lady Bridge in the foreground and Tamworth Castle behind.

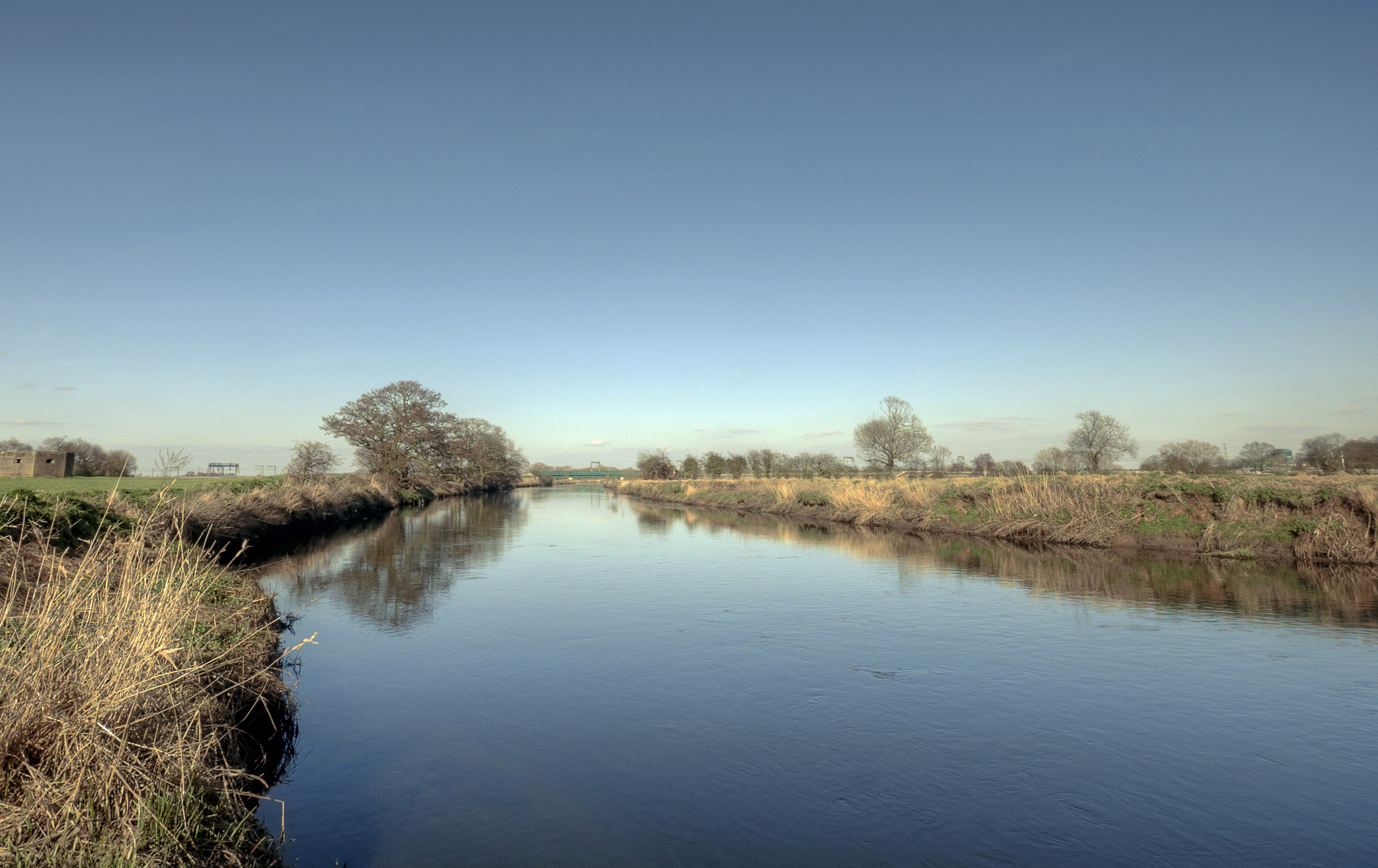
The Tame east of Hopwas

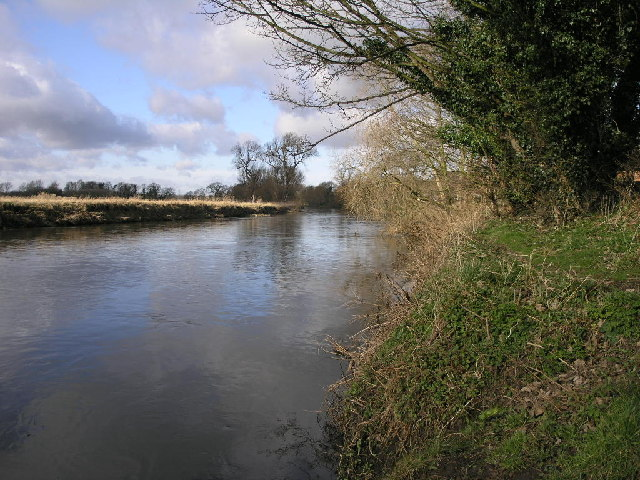
the Tame at Elford, north of Tamworth.

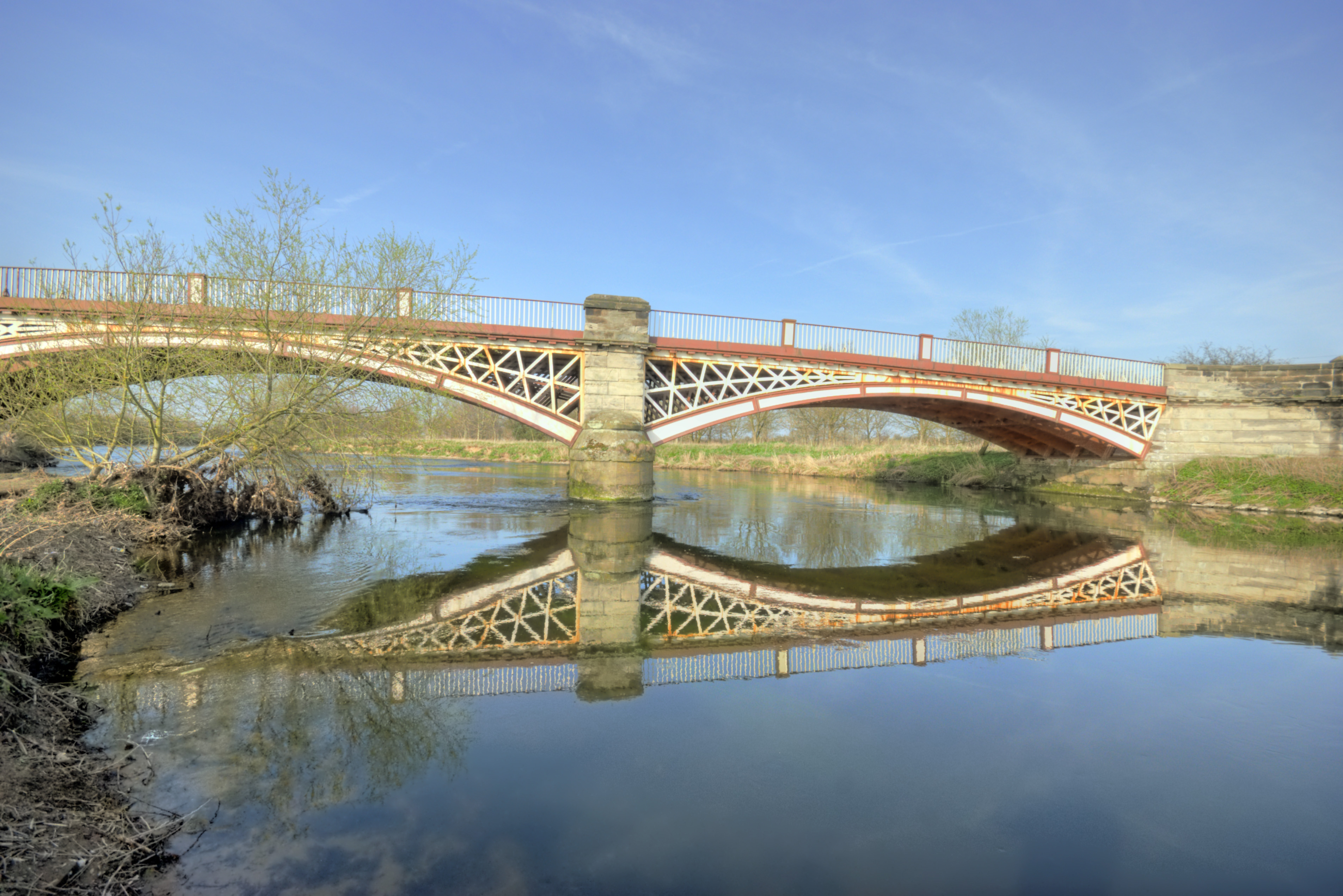
The Tame passing under Chetwynd Bridge near Alrewas, designed by Joseph Potter in 1828.

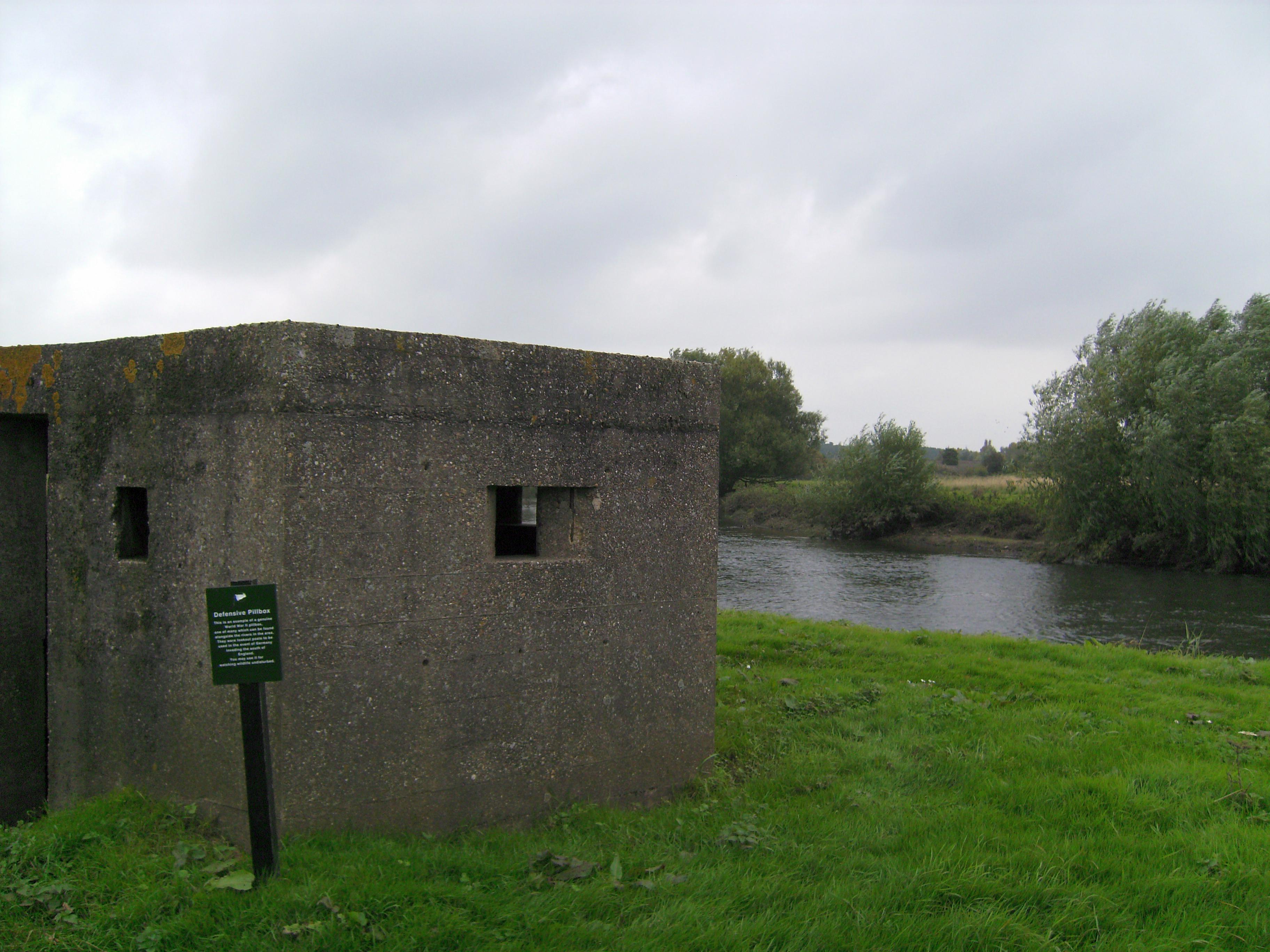
Pillbox on the west bank of the Tame, one of many defences constructed along the Midlands rivers during World War II.

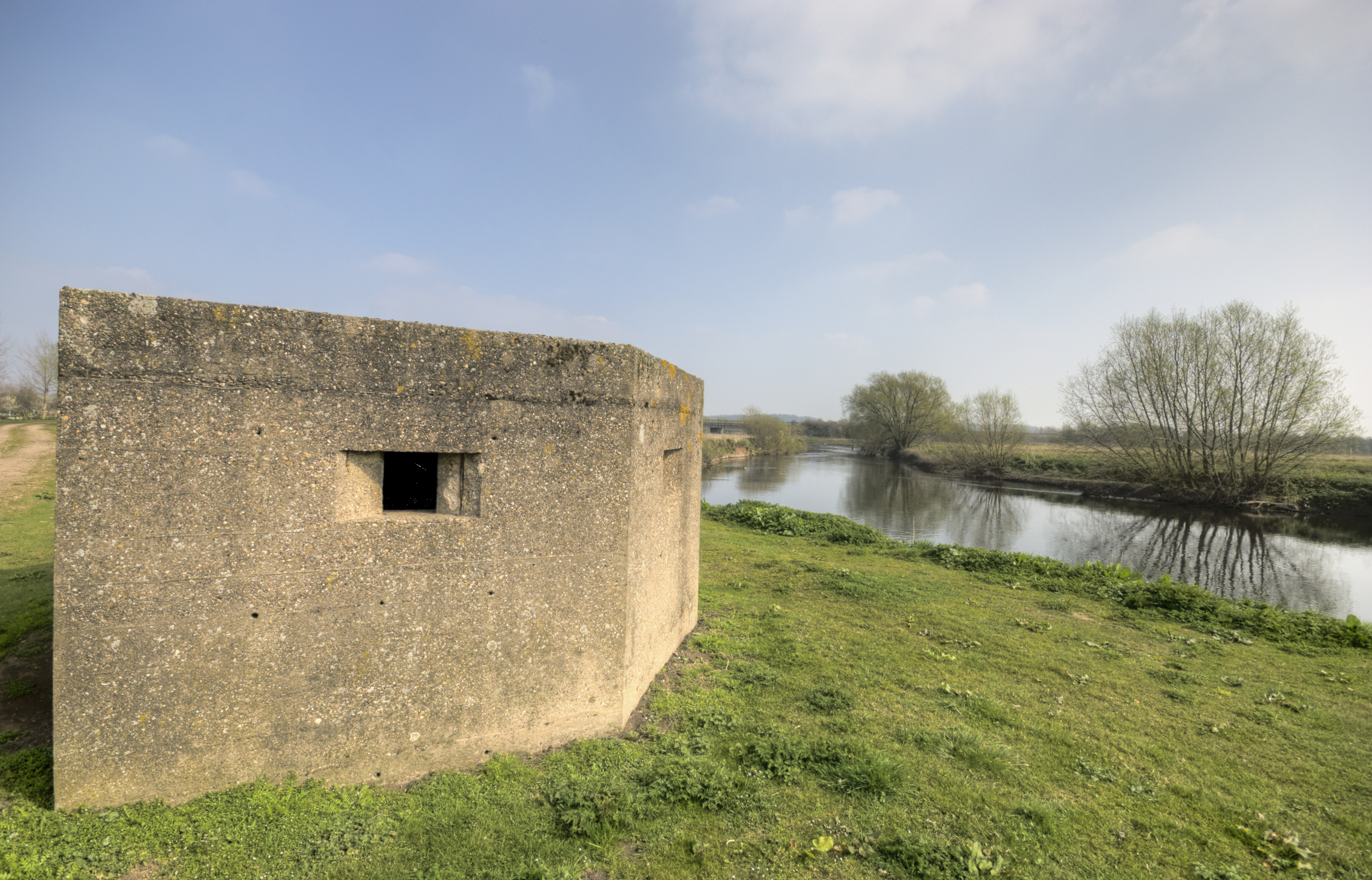
Pillbox on the west bank of the River Tame

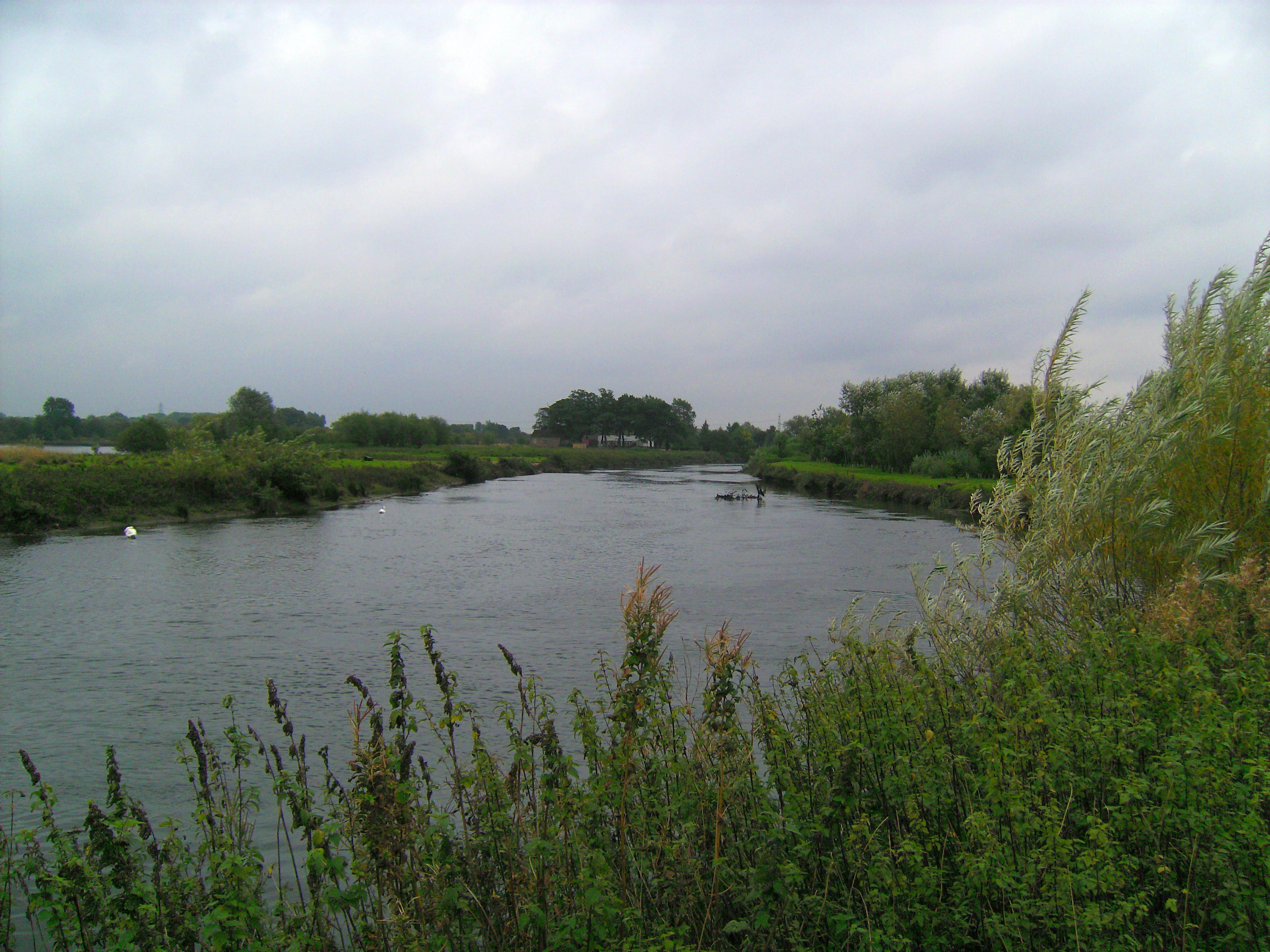
The Tame at the edge of the National Memorial Arboretum, with Croxall Lakes to the left.

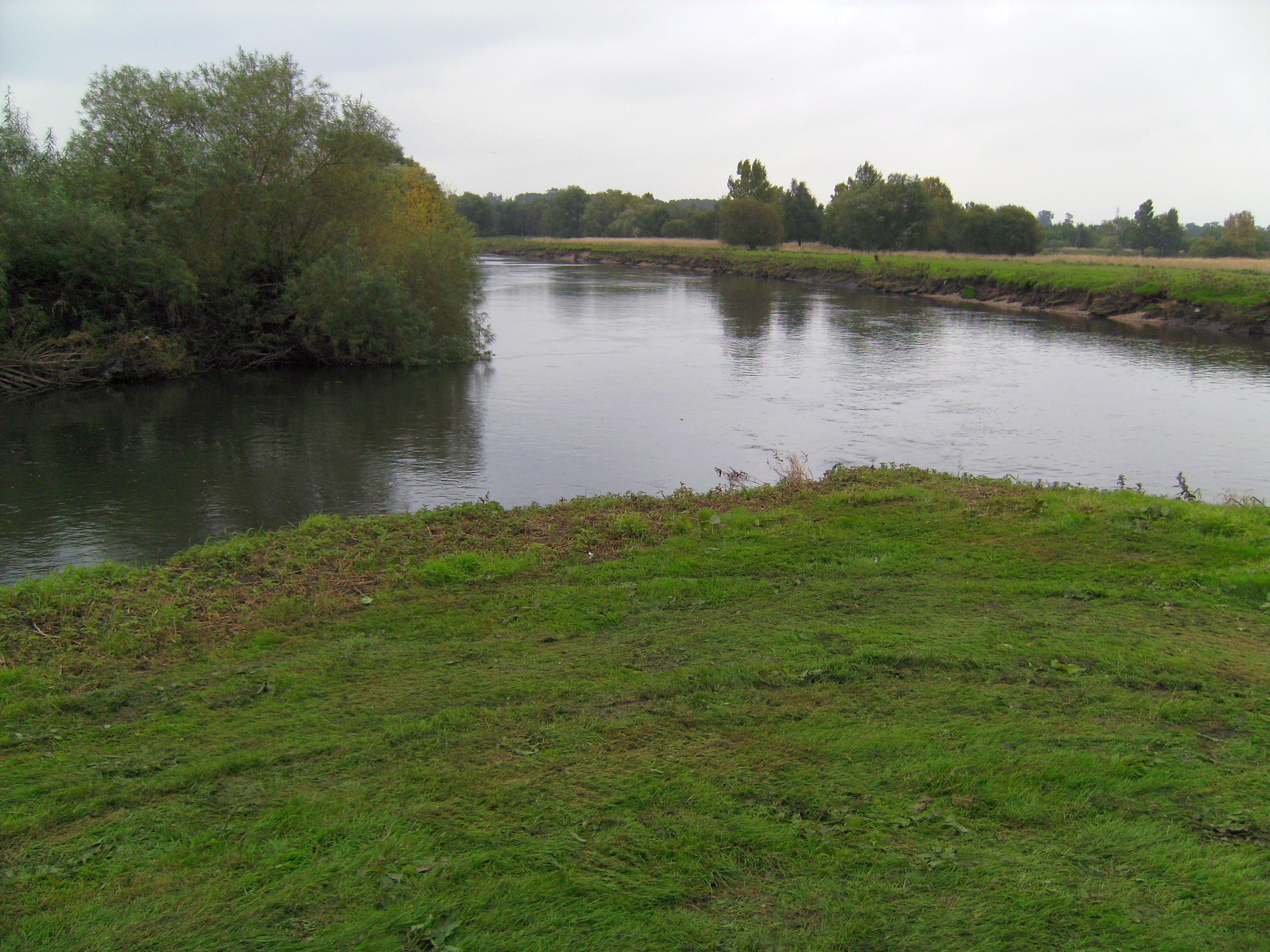
Confluence of the Tame (right) with the River Trent (left), at the northern edge of the National Memorial Arboretum.

The catchment of the Tame covers an area of nearly 1500 km^{2} and contains a population of about 1.7 million people. Approximately 42% of the Tame basin is urbanised, making it the most heavily urbanised river basin in the United Kingdom.

The traditional industries of Birmingham and the Black Country, based on coal, iron and steel, were heavily polluting, and the Tame is conducted through a series of purification lakes below Lea Marston in Warwickshire to remove pollutants, an arrangement unique in the UK. A large part of this lake area forms the Kingsbury Water Park. Clean-up operations in a notoriously polluted stretch of the river in the Witton area of Birmingham have meant that aquatic wildfowl such as ducks and swans have settled on that stretch of the river. Sandwell Valley has evolved over the last two decades into an important urban wildlife habitat.

The Tame is non-navigable throughout its course.

== Pollution ==
The Tame was once one of Britain's dirtiest rivers. It is now much cleaner, due to changes in legislation and the use of purification lakes at Lea Marston.

== Flooding ==
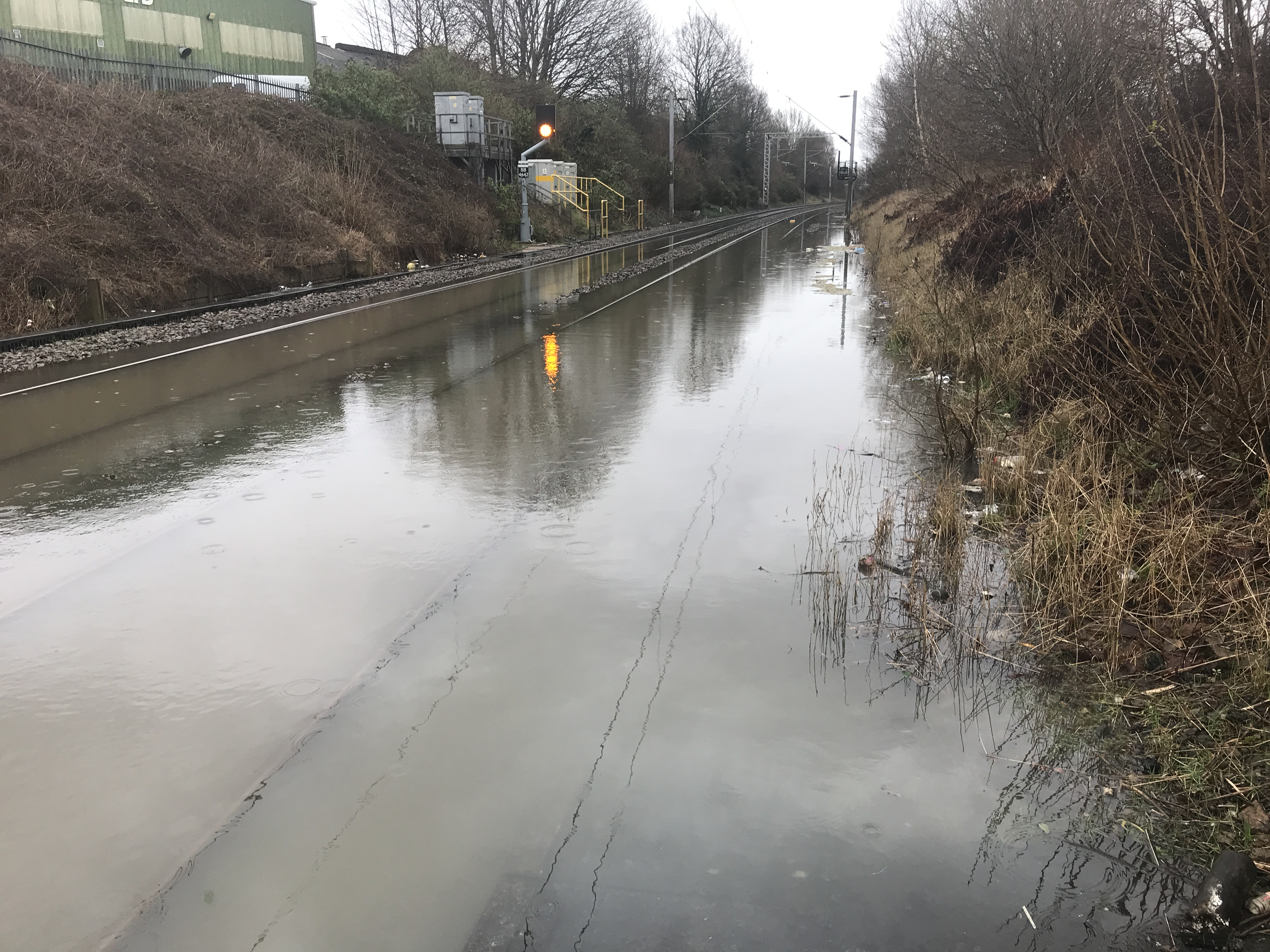
Flooding at Hamstead railway station, Birmingham, England, after the river burst its banks on 16 February 2020, during Storm Dennis

There have been major flooding problems associated with the river. These result largely from the mainly urban character of the upper catchment. Rainfall runs off the roofs and hard surfaces, raising river levels very rapidly. Rapid housebuilding and commercial development may have exacerbated the problem in recent years. Another development contributing to worse flooding has been the general rise in groundwater levels in the upper catchment area. As traditional industries have declined and been replaced by light industries and services, far less water has been taken from the river and the underlying aquifer.

The river is susceptible to spectacular flooding at the village of Hopwas, between Tamworth and Lichfield, during periods of heavy autumnal rain. The long-term persistence of the problem is attested by the Anglo-Saxon meaning of the village's name:- hop – nook of land, was – watery. There is also a substantial bend in the course of the river between Hopwas and Elford, giving rise to the name Tamhorn for the area.

=== Flood prevention ===
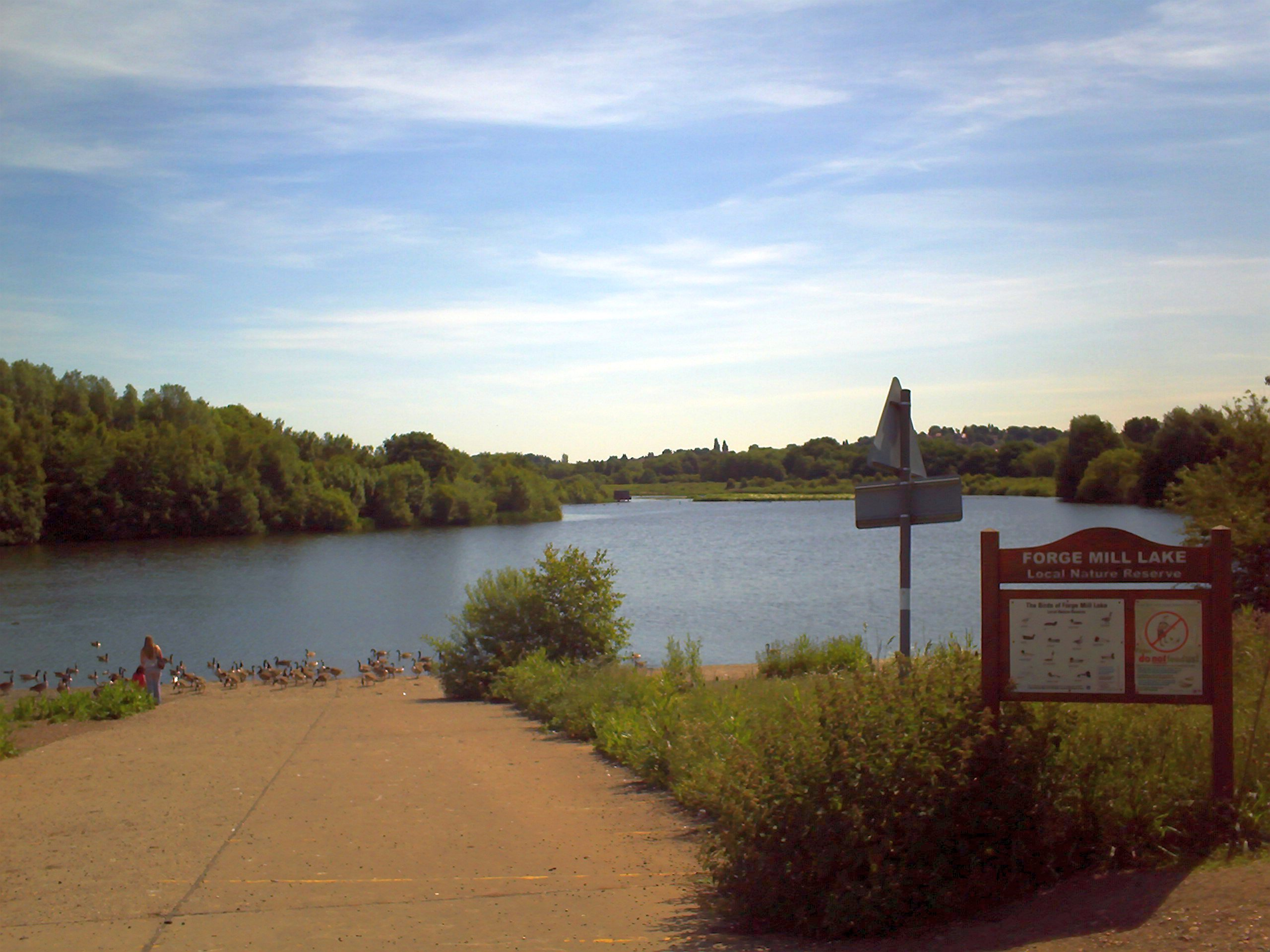
Forge Mill Lake

Flood prevention work was carried out on Sandwell Valley in the 1980s. Forge Mill Lake was created as a stormwater retention basin by enlarging an existing depression. The river was dredged to deepen it and the gravel used to construct an island in the lake. This evolved into part of a nature reserve, at present leased to the Royal Society for the Protection of Birds. At about the same time, a similar arrangement was constructed at Sheepwash Urban Park, utilising old brickworks excavations as a storm water basin to relieve flooding by the Oldbury Arm.

In 2005, the river's alignment through Perry Hall Park in Perry Barr, Birmingham, just downstream of Sandwell Valley, was remodelled to slow the flow, alleviate flooding and create improved habitats for wildlife, as part of the SMURF (Sustainable Management of Urban Rivers and Floodplains) project.

Nonetheless, in June 2007, after heavy rain, the river burst its banks in the Witton area of Birmingham (just downstream of Perry Barr) and at Kingsbury Water Park.

In 2009, the Environment Agency held a public consultation on its proposed flood alleviation measures. Subsequently, the Environment Agency undertook £380,000-worth of improvements, mainly involving dredging and clearing of obstacles. 1000 tonnes of gravel were removed from around the Chester Road Bridge at Castle Vale and deposited further downstream to improve the fish spawning habitat. The Gravelly Hill section was relieved of 900 tonnes of silt and debris. The Oldbury Arm was cleared of debris and five weirs were removed from it to facilitate fish migration. Work under this programme continues into 2011, mainly around Water Orton.

== Features ==
Point	Coordinates (links to map & photo sources)
Sheepwash Urban Park	52.5227°N 2.0395°W
Confluence of Oldbury & Wednesbury branches	52.56378°N 1.992°W
Tame Valley Canal	52.5513°N 1.9661°W
Forge Mill Lake inlet	52.531906°N 1.957956°W
Forge Mill Lake outlet, RSPB Sandwell Valley	52.531°N 1.950°W
SMURF works, Perry Hall Park	52.5253°N 1.9184°W
Confluence with Holbrook	52.525527°N 1.898008°W
Zig Zag bridge (1711)	52.52534°N 1.89711°W
Aldridge Road bridge (1932, art deco)	52.52530°N 1.89681°W
Confluence of Hockley Brook	52.508184°N 1.860258°W
Confluence of River Rea	52.504101°N 1.843814°W
Confluence of Plants Brook	52.5146°N 1.7777°W
Confluence of Churchill Brook	52.5213533°N 1.7584736°W
Confluence of River Blythe	52.52189°N 1.68879°W
Ladywalk Reserve (West Midland Bird Club)	52.5231°N 1.6812°W
Kingsbury Water Park	52.562°N 1.6958°W
RSPB Middleton Lakes	52.5774°N 1.710090°W
Lady Bridge, Tamworth; Confluence of River Anker	52.6319°N 1.6986°W
Croxall Lakes (Staffordshire Wildlife Trust)	52.727461°N 1.7204°W
National Memorial Arboretum	52.7287°N 1.7263°W
Confluence with River Trent	52.7312°N 1.7173°W

== Tributaries ==
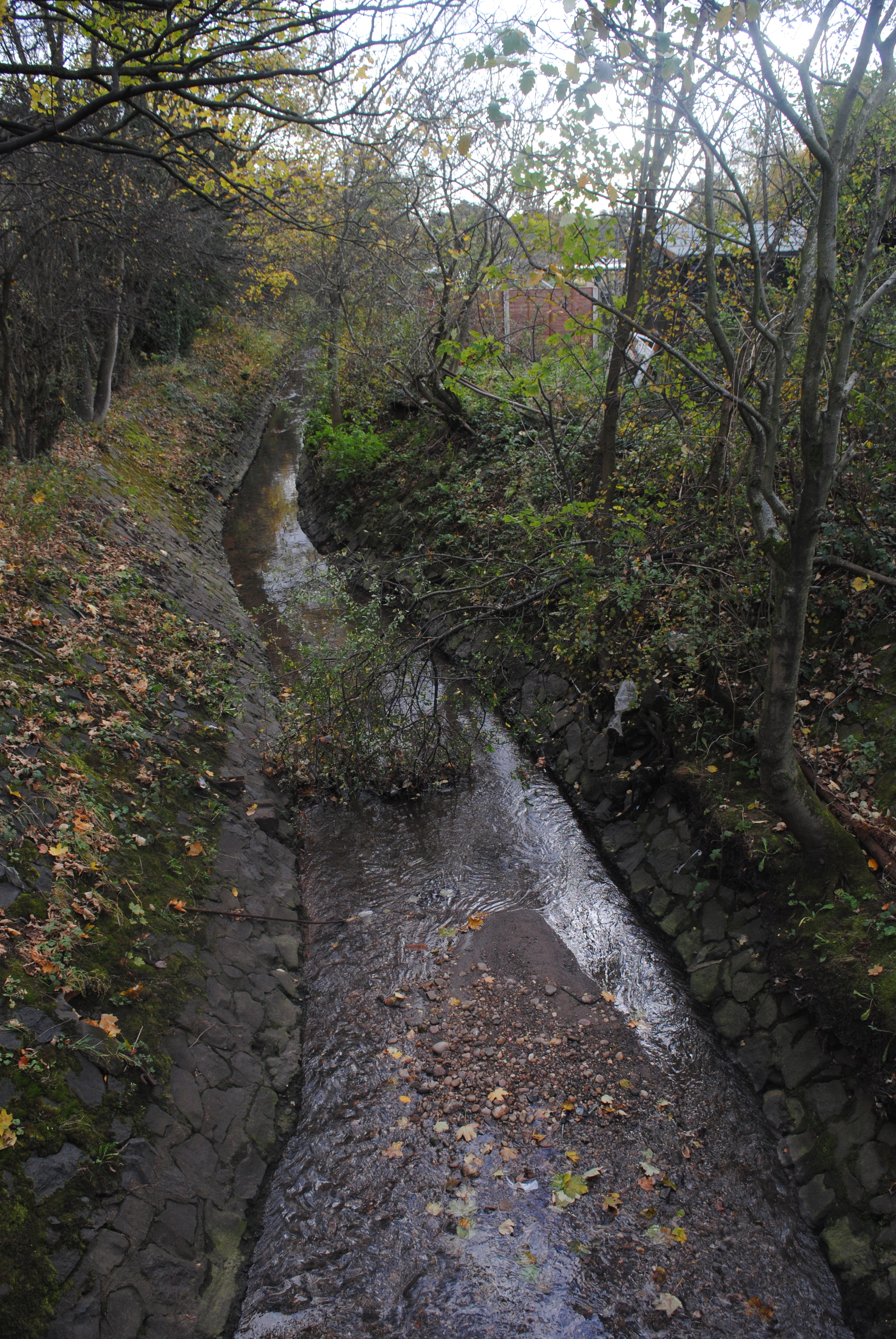
Holbrook, in a concrete-slab lined channel alongside the M6 motorway in Great Barr, Birmingham

Full Brook, Bescot near the confluence with the River Tame

See tributary

- River Anker
  - River Sence
- Bourne Brook which joins the Tame at Fazeley
- River Bourne which joins the Tame near Whitacre Junction
- River Blythe
  - River Cole
- Crane Brook
- Norton Brook
- Footherley Brook
- Little Hay Brook
- Churchill Brook
- Plants Brook
- Hockley Brook
- River Rea
- Holbrook
- Full Brook
- River Tame, Willenhall or Wolverhampton Arm
  - Rusty Brook
  - Ford Brook
  - Sneyd Brook
  - Bilston Brook
    - Woodcross Brook
  - Darlaston Brook
    - Anson Branch Stream
  - Waddens Brook
- River Tame, Oldbury Arm

== See also ==
- Brookvale Park Lake
- River Tame, Greater Manchester
- Rivers of the United Kingdom
- Tame Valley Canal
- Witton Lakes
