= Severn-Trent flyway =

Bird migration route

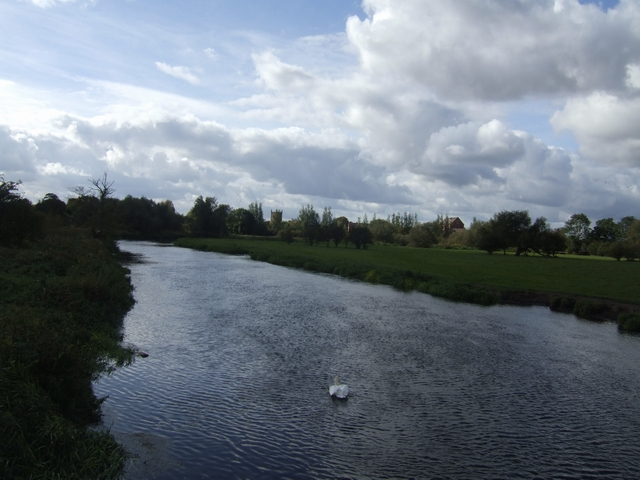
The Trent, downstream of Alrewas

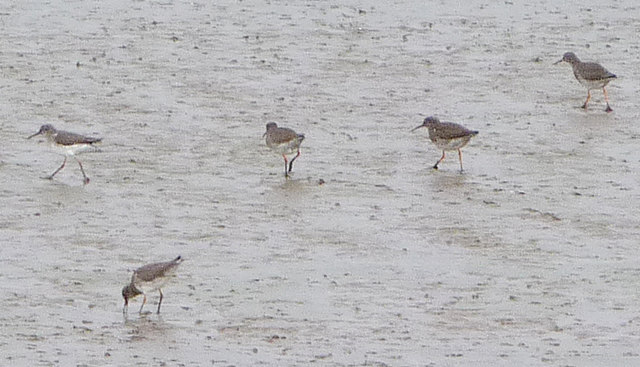
Redshank on the Humber foreshore

The Severn-Trent flyway is a migratory route, or flyway, used by birds crossing Great Britain from the Humber estuary to the Severn estuary or vice versa. It follows the Humber and its tributaries the rivers Trent and Tame, then the River Severn. The last of these is not connected to the other three, and so birds must cross the gap over the West Midlands conurbation, around Birmingham.

It is used by birds migrating locally, within Britain, and by those migrating to or from Northern and Southern Europe.

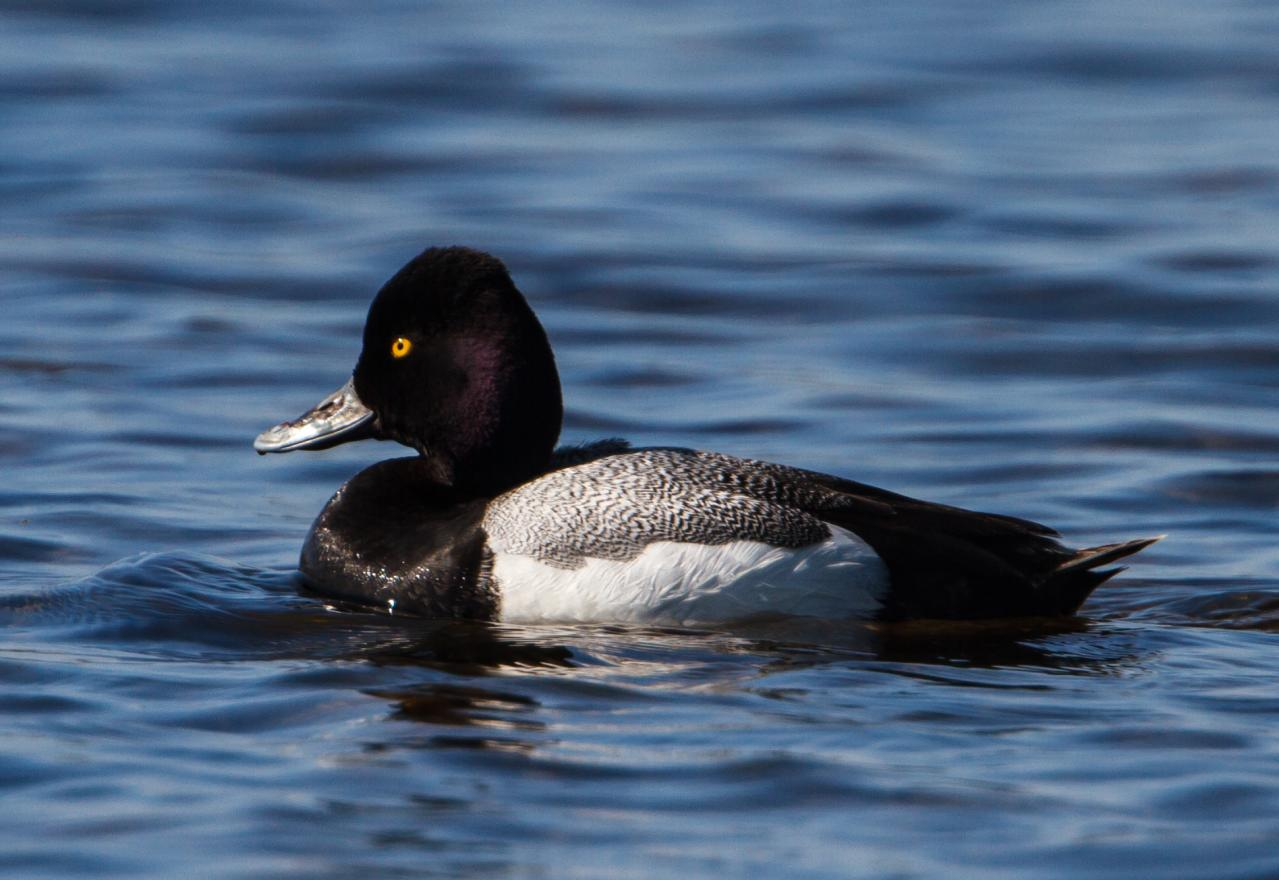
Lesser scaup (Aythya affinis)

Among the birds known to use the flyway are sea ducks such as common scoter (Melanitta nigra), terns such as Arctic tern, and vagrants from North America such as lesser scaup (Aythya affinis), along with European Aythya species.

== Sources ==
- RSPB Where To Go Wild in Britain. Dorling Kindersley. 2009. ISBN 978-1405335126.
- Knox, Alan; Parkin, David (2009). The Status of Birds in Britain and Ireland. Helm. ISBN 978-1408125007.
