= St James' Church, Eve Hill =

Church of St James the Great
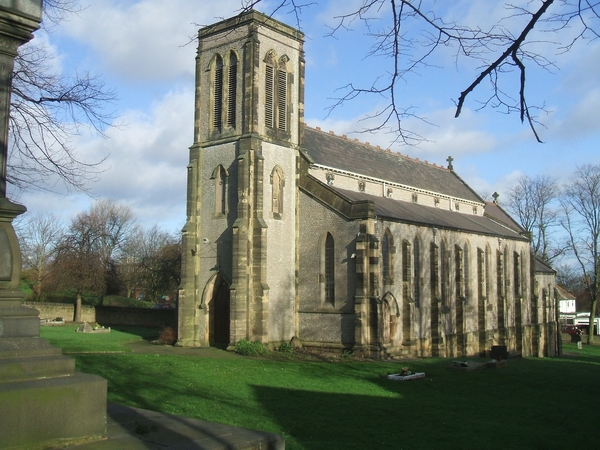
- Church of St James the Great
- 52°30′47.32″N 2°05′40.46″W
- OS grid reference: SO 93679 90588
- Location: Eve Hill, Dudley,West Midlands
- Country: England
- Denomination: Church of England

History
- Dedication: James the Great

Architecture
- Heritage designation: Grade II
- Designated: 11 March 1996
- Completed: 1840

Administration
- Diocese: Worcester

St James' Church is an Anglican church in Eve Hill, in Dudley, West Midlands, England, and in the Diocese of Worcester. It was built in 1840, and it is Grade II listed.

== History ==
Dudley grew in the early 19th century, so that the existing churches, of St Edmund and St Thomas, were insufficient for the population. St James was built as a sister church to St John's Church in the Kates Hill area of Dudley; both were designed in Early English style by William Bourne and were built from 1838 to 1840. They were dedicated by the Bishop of Worcester Robert Carr in July 1840, this church being dedicated, like Dudley Priory, to St James. The building was funded by private subscriptions, donations from the Worcester Society for erecting churches, and from the Church Commissioners. It originally seated about 1000 people, the number being later reduced.

Both churches were originally chapels of ease to the Church of St Thomas. The Parish of St James was created in 1844.

Restoration and improvements were carried out in 1869: the chancel and clerestory were rebuilt, galleries were added, and an organ chamber and vestry were added.

== Description ==
There is a nave with north and south aisles, galleries above the aisles, and a chancel. The west tower has tall lancet-shaped bell-openings in pairs on each side of the upper stage. The arcades, of seven bays, to the aisles have thin columns with foliage capitals.

There is an ornate wrought-iron rood screen. The pulpit, given to the church in 1869, is of Caen stone and depicts saints and biblical figures. The font was given to the church in 1869 by the vicar of Dudley, the Rev James Caulfield Browne. The stained-glass east window, of three lights, was given to the church by the widow of John Roberts, a surgeon who died in 1850.
