= List of public art in Dudley =

This is a list of public art in the Metropolitan Borough of Dudley, in the West Midlands, England. This list applies only to works of public art accessible in an outdoor public space. For example, this does not include artwork visible inside a museum.

== Dudley ==
=== Duncan Edwards Way ===
==== Castle Gate Island ====
Image	Title / subject	Location and coordinates	Date	Artist / designer	Type	Material	Dimensions	Designation	Owner / administrator	Notes
More images	Cannonballs	Castle Gate Island, Dudley 52.513854°N 2.073348°W	2001	Andrew Burton	Sculpture	Concrete, covered in broken brick	1.2m diameter spheres		Dudley Metropolitan Borough Council	Part of the "Medieval Life" collection of sculptures
More images	Cannon	Castle Gate Island, Dudley 52.513746°N 2.073619°W	2001	Andrew Burton	Sculpture	Bronze	4m long x 3m diameter (mouth) x 3.57m high		Dudley Metropolitan Borough Council	Part of the "Medieval Life" collection of sculptures
More images	Crucible	Castle Gate Island, Dudley 52.513694°N 2.073038°W	2001	Andrew Burton	Sculpture	Bronze	3.2m x 1.8m x 2.9m high		Dudley Metropolitan Borough Council	Part of the "Medieval Life" collection of sculptures
More images	Plough	Castle Gate Island, Dudley 52.513611°N 2.073161°W	2001	Andrew Burton	Sculpture	Corten steel and wood	3.5m high x 2.4m wide x 2cm deep		Dudley Metropolitan Borough Council	Part of the "Medieval Life" collection of sculptures
More images	Heraldic lion	Castle Gate Island, Dudley 52.513617°N 2.073367°W	2001	Andrew Burton	Sculpture	Corten steel	2.7m high x 4m long x 3cm deep		Dudley Metropolitan Borough Council	Part of the "Medieval Life" collection of sculptures
More images	Ruined wall (2 blocks)	Castle Gate Island, Dudley 52.513785°N 2.073206°W	2001	Andrew Burton	Sculpture	Ceramic blocks	first block 2.16m high x 4.4m long x 51cm deep; second block 2.75m high x 4.6m long x 51cm deep		Dudley Metropolitan Borough Council	Part of the "Medieval Life" collection of sculptures
More images	Premier Inn Dudley Town Centre sculpture	Premier Inn - Castle Gate Island, Dudley 52.513626°N 2.072004°W			Sculpture				Premier Inn	It's on the Birmingham Road side of the hotel.
More images	James Whale memorial	Showcase Cinemas - Castlegate Way, Dudley 52.515623°N 2.071857°W	2002	Charles Hadcock	Sculpture				Dudley Metropolitan Borough Council	

==== Wolverton Road ====
Image	Title / subject	Location and coordinates	Date	Artist / designer	Type	Material	Dimensions	Designation	Owner / administrator	Notes
More images	Living Fossil	between Wolverton Road and Southern By-Pass - Dudley 52.511493°N 2.074538°W	2000	Natasha Carsberg	Sculpture	Painted steel			Dudley Metropolitan Borough Council	resembles a giant seed pod surmounted by a calyx and part of the stalk
More images	Spiral Fossil	between Wolverton Road and Southern By-Pass - Dudley 52.511737°N 2.074174°W	2000	Michael Konu	Sculpture	Kilkenny limestone			Dudley Metropolitan Borough Council	inspired by a gastropod fossil
More images	Dawn of Time	between Wolverton Road and Southern By-Pass - Dudley 52.510866°N 2.075482°W	2001	Michael Lyons	Sculpture	Steel painted yellow			Dudley Metropolitan Borough Council	Suggests a sunrise
More images	Standing Stone	between Wolverton Road and Southern By-Pass - Dudley 52.511983°N 2.073884°W	2000	John Vaughan	Sculpture	Limestone			Dudley Metropolitan Borough Council	resembles two stylized, intertwined standing figures
More images	Giant Hand	between Wolverton Road and Southern By-Pass - Dudley 52.511247°N 2.074808°W	2000	Jonathan Mulvaney	Sculpture	Ferro-cement			Dudley Metropolitan Borough Council	large hand and wrist is lying on the grass, palm down
More images	Fossil sculpture	between Wolverton Road and Southern By-Pass, Dudley 52.512519°N 2.073358°W			Sculpture				Dudley Metropolitan Borough Council	

==== Flood Street Island ====
Image	Title / subject	Location and coordinates	Date	Artist / designer	Type	Material	Dimensions	Designation	Owner / administrator	Notes
More images	Salamander Obelisk	Flood Street Island, Dudley 52.507213°N 2.080823°W	2000	Steve Field	Obelisk Sculpture	Filigree steel			Dudley Metropolitan Borough Council	

==== Cinder Bank Island ====
Image	Title / subject	Location and coordinates	Date	Artist / designer	Type	Material	Dimensions	Designation	Owner / administrator	Notes
	Fire Tower	Cinder Bank Island, Dudley 52.500001°N 2.090573°W	2000	Phillip Bews & Diane Gorvin	Sculpture	Steel painted red	13cm diameter, 20m high, 1.3m wide (max.)		Dudley Metropolitan Borough Council	Six steel tubes forming a circle are welded to a circular steel base.
	Fires of Industry	Cinder Bank Island, Dudley 52.500274°N 2.090692°W	2000	Phillip Bews & Diane Gorvin	Sculpture	Steel painted red	20m long x 8m high x 31cm deep		Dudley Metropolitan Borough Council	3 steel wedges
	Heroic Worker	Cinder Bank Island, Dudley 52.500464°N 2.090956°W	2000	Phillip Bews & Diane Gorvin	Statue	Bronze	3m high x 1.65m wide x 1.1m deep		Dudley Metropolitan Borough Council	bronze statue of a workman stands on a circle of bricks

==== Scotts Green Island ====
Image	Title / subject	Location and coordinates	Date	Artist / designer	Type	Material	Dimensions	Designation	Owner / administrator	Notes
More images	Millennium (Pegasus)	Scotts Green Island, Dudley 52.502602°N 2.104897°W	2001	Andrew Logan	Sculpture	Bronze			Dudley Metropolitan Borough Council	

=== Town Centre ===
Image	Title / subject	Location and coordinates	Date	Artist / designer	Type	Material	Dimensions	Designation	Owner / administrator	Notes
More images	The Earl of Dudley	Castle Hill, Dudley 52.512349°N 2.080289°W	1888	C B Birch	Statue	Marble		Grade II listed	Dudley Metropolitan Borough Council	
More images	Green Man Entry	Castle Street, Dudley 52.512147°N 2.080901°W	2014	John McKenna	Sculpture	Cast bronze			Dudley Metropolitan Borough Council	May have been a passageway to an old ale house
More images	Apollo fountain	Coronation Gardens, Ednam Road, Dudley 52.51277°N 2.08337°W	1939	William Bloye	Statue / fountain	Bronze			Dudley Metropolitan Borough Council	
More images	Duncan Edwards	Market Place, Dudley 52.509664°N 2.080993°W	1999	James Butler	Statue	Bronze			Dudley Metropolitan Borough Council	Was in temporary storage in 2014. Re-dedicated in October 2015
More images	Drinking Fountain	Market Place, Dudley 52.510383°N 2.082499°W	1867	James Forsyth	Drinking fountain sculpture	Stone		Grade II* listed fountain.	Dudley Metropolitan Borough Council	
More images	Ben Boucher	Market Place, Dudley 52.510241°N 2.082626°W	2015	John McKenna and Steve Field	Statue	Bronze			Dudley Metropolitan Borough Council	A stone bench where people can take selfies with the statue
More images	Family Group	Near the footbridge - King Street, Dudley 52.509454°N 2.080711°W	1969	Edward Bainbridge Copnall	Sculpture	Oak	400cm high x 90cm wide x 90cm deep		Dudley Metropolitan Borough Council	depicts a man and woman back to back, with a child at their side, and supporting two children on their shoulders
More images	Figure Group	Birdcage Walk, Dudley 52.511055°N 2.080898°W	1963	Edward Bainbridge Copnall	Frieze	fibreglass and powdered aluminium	240cm high x 800cm wide		Dudley Metropolitan Borough Council	Female figure and child represent Education and Family. Two male figures represent Mining and Chainmaking.
More images	Long Entry	Alleyway - King Street to Market Place, Dudley 52.509566°N 2.082218°W	1995	Steve Field	sculpture	Painted Steel			Dudley Metropolitan Borough Council	Set of arches over a passageway depicting scenes from Medieval life
More images	Dudley Evolve Theatre stone sculpture	Dudley Evolve Theatre, The Broadway, Dudley 52.51287°N 2.08212°W	2018		Sculpture	Stone			Dudley College	Contains a quote by Rabindranath Tagore (1861 - 1941) - 'You can't cross the sea merely by standing and staring at the water'.

=== Priory Park ===
Image	Title / subject	Location and coordinates	Date	Artist / designer	Type	Material	Dimensions	Designation	Owner / administrator	Notes
More images	People Group	Near a pond - Priory Park, Dudley 52.516762°N 2.085127°W	1992	Jonathan Mulvaney	Sculpture	Wood			Dudley Metropolitan Borough Council	
	Priory Monks mosaic	opposite Registry Office in Priory Park, Dudley 52.516826°N 2.085641°W	1991	Maggie Howarth	Mosaic	Slate			Dudley Metropolitan Borough Council	
More images	Medieval Tiles	Near the Priory Ruins - Priory Park, Dudley 52.51545°N 2.084941°W	2012	Company of Artisans	Floor tiles	Ceramic			Dudley Metropolitan Borough Council	A set of 12 tiled pavements. Installed between 2012-14
More images	The Return of Dorothy Round	Near tennis courts in Priory Park, Dudley 52.517495°N 2.087585°W	2013	John McKenna	Statue	Bronze			Dudley Metropolitan Borough Council	
More images	Decorative gateway	Corner of Priory Road and The Broadway, Priory Park, Dudley 52.515255°N 2.086747°W	2013	Steve Field	Gates sculpture				Dudley Metropolitan Borough Council	

=== Black Country Living Museum ===
Image	Title / subject	Location and coordinates	Date	Artist / designer	Type	Material	Dimensions	Designation	Owner / administrator	Notes
More images	War memorial	Black Country Living Museum - Dudley 52.518832°N 2.077156°W	1923		War memorial statue	Bronze			Black Country Living Museum	Originally erected in 1923 at William Butler's Springfield Brewery in Wolverhampton. Relocated here in 2010.

=== Dudley Zoo ===
Image	Title / subject	Location and coordinates	Date	Artist / designer	Type	Material	Dimensions	Designation	Owner / administrator	Notes
	Plight of the Orangutan	Dudley Zoo	20 December 2022	Luke Perry	Statue	Steel poles			Dudley Zoo	Features 100 steel poles, 97 of them cut to symbolise the devastating effects of deforestation, mostly due to palm oil plantations. It's designed to raise awareness about the plight of the critically endangered species.

== Brierley Hill ==
Image	Title / subject	Location and coordinates	Date	Artist / designer	Type	Material	Dimensions	Designation	Owner / administrator	Notes
More images	Briar Rose	Bank Street, Brierley Hill 52.483687°N 2.121415°W			Sculpture				Centro	
	Brierley Hill War Memorial	Church Street, Brierley Hill 52.478385°N 2.125595°W	1926		War memorial	Marble, stone, brick, metal railings and cannon		Grade II	Dudley MBC	
More images	John Northwood	Merry Hill Shopping Centre, Brierley Hill 52.48259°N 2.11290°W	1999	Anthony Stones	Statue	Bronze and glass	H 250 x W (?) x D (?) cm		Merry Hill Shopping Centre	A memorial statue of John Northwood (1836-1902), mounted on a pedestal of glass bricks, alluding to the importance of the local glass-making industry. Northwood is shown in contemporary Victorian dress, proudly holding up his reproduction of the Portland Vase to the light with both hands.
	Thomas Hickinbottom	Corner of Venture Way and Mill Street, Brierley Hill 52.479483°N 2.120282°W	2009	Neil Woods and Steve Field	Statue	Bronze			Dudley MBC	Statue of a young boxing champion who died in a motorcycle accident in August 2003.

== Halesowen ==
Image	Title / subject	Location and coordinates	Date	Artist / designer	Type	Material	Dimensions	Designation	Owner / administrator	Notes
	Canal Worker	Hawne Basin Dudley No. 2 Canal, Halesowen 52.45753°N 2.03957°W			Statue	Bronze			Canal and River Trust	Depicts a canal worker (also called a boatman or legger) holding a chain. This commemorates the thousands of workers who handled the transhipment of steel tubes and minerals from the nearby Stewarts & Lloyds works. It stands near the entrance of the basin, often positioned next to an "End of Navigation" sign.
More images	You Are Here	Cross Street, Halesowen 52.44520°N 2.05688°W	July 21, 2025	Tom Hicks	Sculpture	Metal			Dudley Metropolitan Borough Council	Celebrates Halesowen's cultural history. It is a large blue, pink and white metal structure includes the engraved trade names and typefaces of local businesses and is part of a new transport hub and green public space on Cross Street.

== Lye ==
Image	Title / subject	Location and coordinates	Date	Artist / designer	Type	Material	Dimensions	Designation	Owner / administrator	Notes
More images	Sir Cedric Hardwicke Memorial	Dudley Road, Lye 52.458776°N 2.117764°W	2005	Tim Tolkien	Sculpture	Steel			Dudley Metropolitan Borough Council	
More images	Lye War Memorial	Christ Church The Lye and Stambermill, High Street, Lye 52.457408°N 2.114075°W			War memorial				Dudley Metropolitan Borough Council	

== Stourbridge ==
=== Stourbridge Town Centre ===
Image	Title / subject	Location and coordinates	Date	Artist / designer	Type	Material	Dimensions	Designation	Owner / administrator	Notes
More images	Ryemarket sculpture	Ryemarket Shopping Centre, Stourbridge 52.455834°N 2.145437°W		Steve Field	Sculpture				Ryemarket Shopping Centre	
More images	Tesco Extra sculpture	Tesco Extra, Bath Road, Stourbridge 52.457003°N 2.149448°W	2013		Sculpture				Tesco	
More images	Flight of Charles II	High Street, Stourbridge 52.460624°N 2.148608°W	2024		Pair of sculptures	Steel (laser cut)			Dudley MBC	Two panels.

=== Mary Stevens Park ===
Image	Title / subject	Location and coordinates	Date	Artist / designer	Type	Material	Dimensions	Designation	Owner / administrator	Notes
More images	Stourbridge War Memorial	Mary Stevens Park, Queen's Drive, Stourbridge 52.449683°N 2.150775°W	1923	Ernest Pickford	War Memorial				Dudley Metropolitan Borough Council	It was unveiled by the Earl of Coventry on 16 February 1923.
More images	Major Frank Foley	Council House, Mary Stevens Park, Stourbridge 52.449547°N 2.152382°W	2018	Andy De Comyn	Statue bench	Bronze			Dudley Metropolitan Borough Council	Unveiled by the Duke of Cambridge on 18 September 2018

=== Stourbridge Interchange ===
Image	Title / subject	Location and coordinates	Date	Artist / designer	Type	Material	Dimensions	Designation	Owner / administrator	Notes
More images	Glass blower	Stourbridge Interchange 52.456198°N 2.142376°W		John McKenna	Statue	Bronze			Centro	Celebrates the great history of hands glass blown items throughout Stourbridge
More images	Locomotives	Subway entrance to Stourbridge Interchange - Foster Street, Stourbridge 52.455684°N 2.144065°W			Sculpture	Painted steel			Centro	
	Cameo	Stourbridge bus interchange	1994	Steve Field	Mosaics and anamorphic columns				Centro	Mosaics of a grey heron and a cockerel, based on cameo glass from nearby Broadfield House Glass Museum.

=== Stourbridge Junction ===
Image	Title / subject	Location and coordinates	Date	Artist / designer	Type	Material	Dimensions	Designation	Owner / administrator	Notes
	Stourbridge Junction Clock	Car Park - Stourbridge Junction Station 52.447477°N 2.133608°W		Anuradha Patel	Clock Tower				Centro	

=== Oldswinford ===
Image	Title / subject	Location and coordinates	Date	Artist / designer	Type	Material	Dimensions	Designation	Owner / administrator	Notes
	Old Cross crossroads	Furniture - Hagley Road, Oldswinford, Stourbridge 52.448405°N 2.140874°W			Sculpture					Opposite the pub The Cross at Oldswinford.

== Lost or in storage ==
Image	Title / subject	Location and coordinates	Date	Artist / designer	Type	Material	Dimensions	Designation	Owner / administrator	Notes
	Industries of the Lye	High Street, Lye 52.457377°N 2.114792°W	1989	Steve Field	Mural					. Removed 2010
