= Luke Booker =

English Anglican clergyman, poet and antiquary

Reverend Luke Booker LL.D., FRLS
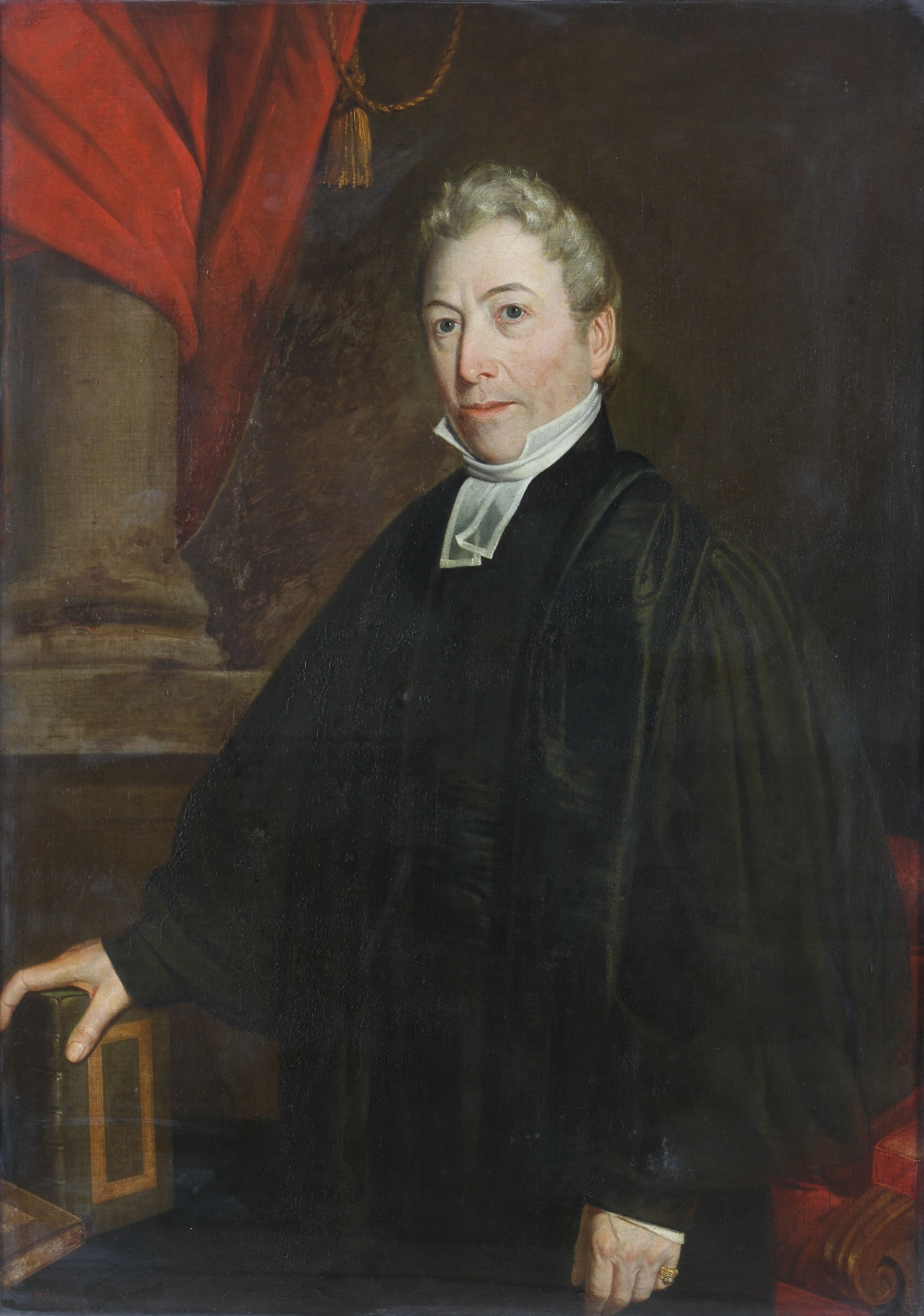
- William J. Pringle: Reverend Luke Booker (1762–1835), LLD, Vicar of Dudley; Dudley Museums Service

Orders
- Ordination: by Frederick Cornwallis, Bishop of Lichfield and Coventry

Personal details
- Born: 20 October 1762 Nottingham, England
- Died: 1 October 1835 (aged 72) Bower Ashton, England
- Denomination: Church of England
- Spouse: Ann
- Children: 2
- Occupation: Clergyman, poet, and antiquary

Rev. Luke Booker (20 October 1762 – 1 October 1835) LL.D., FRLS was an English Anglican clergyman, poet and antiquary, with a long list of published sermons and poetry. As a cleric he was strongly linked with the town of Dudley, then an exclave of Worcestershire.

== Early years ==
Booker was born in Nottingham, England. As a young man, he pursued the religious studies of the Church of England, and took Holy Orders in 1785. Frederick Cornwallis, Bishop of Lichfield and Coventry ordained Booker without a title.

== Career ==
Shortly after his ordination, Booker became a lecturer at St Peter's Collegiate Church, Wolverhampton, after which he became a curate at Oldswinford. Then for many years he served as vicar of Church of St. Edmund in Dudley. In 1806, he became rector of Tedstone Delamere, after an introduction by his brother-in-law, Richard Blakemore. He returned to Dudley in 1812 through his association with William Lord Viscount Dudley and Ward.

Booker laid the cornerstone for Dudley's St Thomas Church on 25 October 1816. He remained at Dudley until shortly before his death, having preached 173 sermons. During the Regency, Booker was one of the Chaplains in Ordinary to George IV.

"... that at a time when a gloomy spirit is pervading the country, not only diminishing the stock of harmless enjoyments, but endangering a morbid taste detrimental also to elegant literature, a drama might be constructed, though not professedly of a sacred character, against which fanaticism itself should have no just cause to allege any objection." (Booker's explanation for publishing his 1831 play, The Champion of Cyrus, a drama, in five acts.)

—

A charity preacher and an early contributor to the Anti-Jacobin Review and Magazine, Booker was a prolific publisher of poems and sermons, and at least one play. In 1823, he edited Poetical Blossoms by poet Robert Millhouse. He was a Fellow of the Royal Society of Literature, and a philanthropist. Booker also served as Justice of the Peace for the counties of Worcester, Hereford, and Stafford.

== Personal life ==
Booker married four times. One marriage was to Ann, daughter of Thomas Blakemore. Ann and Luke Booker had two children. The son, Thomas William Booker, was adopted by Blakemore, raised at Melingriffith Tin Plate Works, and became MP for Herefordshire. The daughter was Harriet-Esther Booker.

Booker died at Bower Ashton, England on 1 October 1835. William J. Pringle's portrait of him is in the Dudley Museum's collection.

== Political views ==
During his time at Dudley, Booker became involved in the controversy over political reform. In particular, he opposed the enfranchisement of Dudley both before and after the Reform Act 1832 had allowed the voters of Dudley to elect an MP for the first time in modern history.

== Selected works ==
- The Highlanders, a poem, 1778
- Poems on subjects sacred, moral, and entertaining, 2 vols, 1785
- A Sermon, preached in the parish church of old Swinford, Worcestershire, 1788
- Miscellaneous Poems, 1789
- A Sermon, preached at St. Edmund's church, in Dudley; and published for the purpose of erecting a monument, 1791
- Britain's Happiness; an assize sermon ... exhibiting an historical review of providential interpositions in favour of the British Empire, 1792
- A Sermon preached in the parish church of St. Thomas; at Dudley ... and an address to the common people, &c. on the subject of riots, 1793
- Sermons on various subjects, 1793
- Malvern, a descriptive and historical poem, 1798
- The Hop-Garden, a didactic poem, 1799
- A Discourse, (addressed chiefly to parents) on the duty and advantages of inoculating children, 1802
- Calista; or, a picture of modern life, 1803
- Poems, 1803
- Tobias, a poem, 1805
- A Moral Review of the Conduct and Case of Mary Ashford, in refutation of the arguments adduced in defence of her supposed violator and murderer, 1818
- The Foundations of a Kingdom Endangered by Iniquity, and its ruin prevented by righteousness, 1820
- Euthanasia; or, the state of man after death, 1822
- A Descriptive and Historical Account of Dudley Castle, and its surrounding scenery; with graphic illustrations, 1825
- Tributes to the Dead, consisting of ... epitaphs, 1830
- The Champion of Cyrus: a drama, 1831
- The Springs of Plynlimmon: a poem, 1834
