= St John's Church, Dudley =

Church of St John the Evangelist
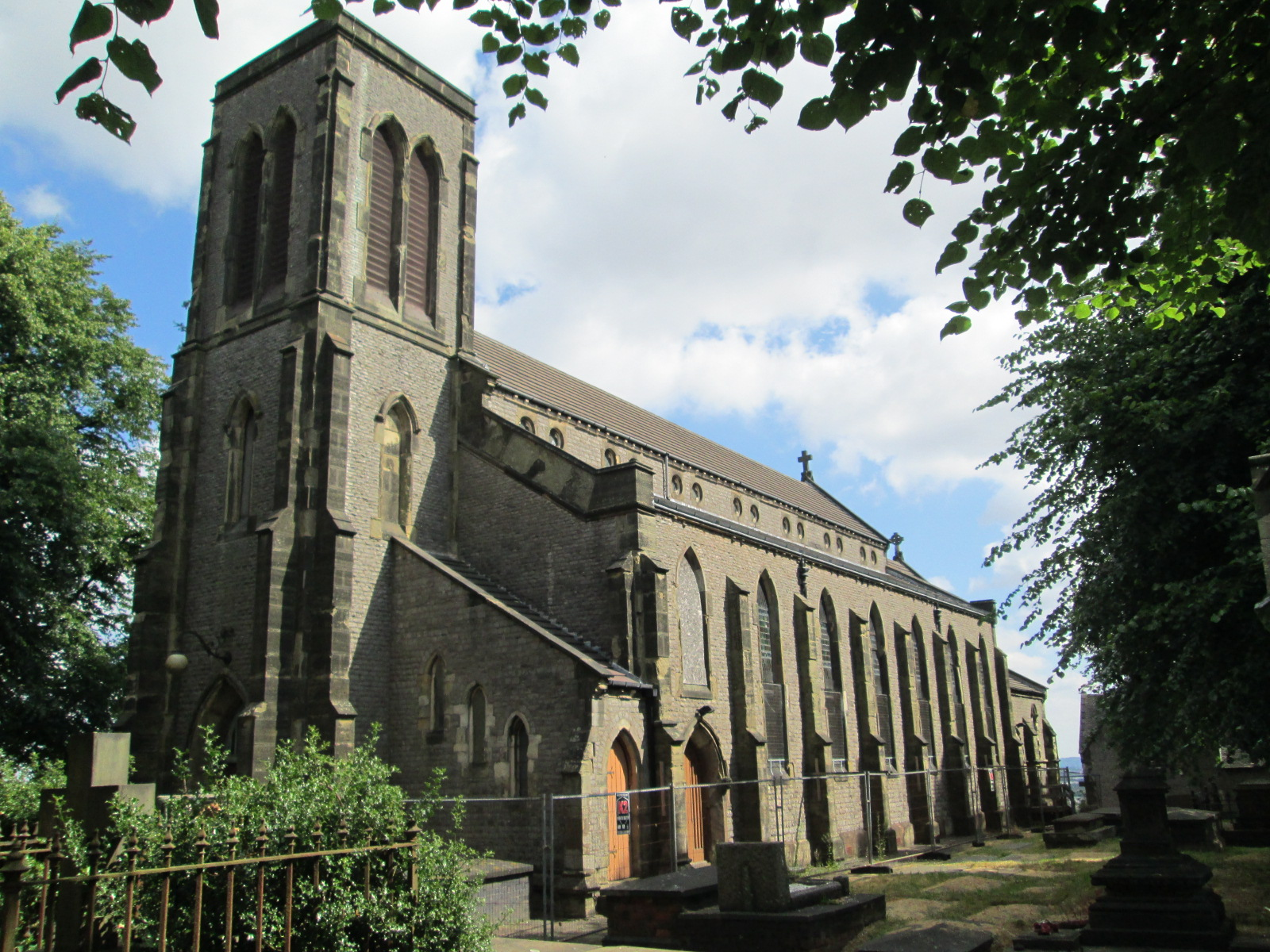
- The church in July 2018
- Church of St John the Evangelist
- 52.50831°N 2.07302°W
- Location: Kates Hill, Dudley
- Country: England
- Denomination: Church of England

Architecture
- Heritage designation: Grade II listed
- Completed: 1840

The Church of St John the Evangelist, also known as St John's, is a Church of England church, in the Kates Hill area of Dudley, England. It opened in 1840 and closed in 2002 on safety grounds. The church reopened in 2016.

It was Grade II listed by English Heritage on 21 May 2009.

== History ==
Two churches were built in Dudley at the same time and to similar designs by William Bourne; St John's and St James's, at Eve Hill. It was built when Kates Hill was still a relatively rural area, although it was soon a dense residential area following the construction of houses occupied by workers employed in local industry during the Industrial Revolution. The area became even more built up during the 1920s and 1930s when council housing was built nearby.

In the years after the church's closure, "St John's Church Preservation Group", whose patron is local historian Professor Carl Chinn, campaigned for the church to be repaired and reopened.

The St John's Church Preservation Group became leaseholders of the church on 27 July 2016, and in August it was opened to the public for the first time since 2002. It was announced that the church would be open daily from 12 September 2016, so that visitors can see the restoration work take place. On 27 July 2018, the first service in the church in 15 years was held, led by the Rector of Dudley, Rev Robert Barlow.

== Graveyard ==
The church's graveyard is the burial place of the boxer William Perry, known as 'The Tipton Slasher', who was champion of England, 1850–5; also of Marion Richardson (1892–1946), educator and author of books on penmanship and handwriting.
