= Robert Millhouse =

English Spenserian poet

Robert Millhouse (1788–1839) was an English Spenserian poet, born in Nottingham, England.

Contemporaneously compared to Robert Bloomfield and John Clare, he too obtained some fame as a provincial poet, though his own life was affected by his serial marriages, ill-health and poverty. His Poetical Blossoms was somewhat notably edited by fellow Nottingham poet, clergyman and antiquary Reverend Luke Booker, in 1823.

== Notable publications ==
- Vicissitude, a poem in four books and other pieces. 1821.
- Blossoms by Robert Millhouse. Being a selection of sonnets. 2nd edition. 1823.
- The song of the patriot, sonnets, and songs. 1826.
- Sherwood forest, and other poems. 1827.
- The destinies of man. 1832.
- The destinies of man, part second. 1834.
- The sonnets and songs of Robert Millhouse, ed. J. P. Briscoe. 1881.
