= Bishop Milner Catholic College =

Secondary school in West Midlands, England

Location
- Burton Road; Dudley, West Midlands, DY1 3BY; England; 52°31′11″N 2°06′08″W

Information
- Type: Academy
- Motto: Latin: Pro Petri Fide (For the Love of Peter)
- Religious affiliation: Roman Catholic
- Established: 1960
- Department for Education URN: 140126 Tables
- Ofsted: Reports
- Principal: Siobhan Foster
- Gender: Coeducational
- Age: 11 to 18
- Enrolment: 850
- Colour: Milner Maroon
- Alumni: Old Milnerians
- Website: http://bmilner.dudley.sch.uk/

Bishop Milner Catholic College (previously Bishop Milner Catholic School) is a Roman Catholic secondary school and sixth form with academy status, located in the Eve Hill area of Dudley, West Midlands, England. Enrolment includes students who live beyond Dudley's borders, mostly in Sandwell. The college also has enrolled a number of non-Catholic pupils. The school is named after Roman Catholic Bishop John Milner.

== History ==
The College first opened as Bishop Milner Catholic School in 1960 and was one of the first Catholic secondary schools in the Midlands. Bishop Milner Catholic College is named after John Milner, a Roman Catholic Bishop and writer who served as the Vicar Apostolic of the Midland District from 1803 to 1826. In 1963, an extension was added to the main college building as well as with a new dining hall. In 1981 a "Secretary's" block was also opened. A new classroom block for the teaching of dramatic arts, dance, music, ICT, and other general classrooms as well as sixth form studies was opened in 1994. Most of the school buildings were replaced between 2002 and 2005 at a cost over £6 million.

Bishop Milner is one of the few Dudley borough schools with a sixth form, as most were closed in the early 1990s when the UK was introducing tertiary education. In the Autumn term of 2011 the reception area was extended and additional office space created above the reception on the first floor. In 2012, the sixth form area was updated to include a café area named "The Hub" along with the formation of enhanced study facilities. Bishop Milner converted voluntarily to academy status in September 2013 and took the name of Bishop Milner Catholic College. The Academy was formed in partnership with St Chad's Catholic Primary School, Sedgley and St Joseph's Catholic Primary School, Dudley. Together, the three schools are a Multi Academy Company (MAC) and have taken the name of St John Bosco Catholic Academy.

Bishop Milner has links with local universities such as University of Birmingham, Newman University and University of Wolverhampton along with those that are further afield e.g. University of Oxford. The college also secured places on the Prime Minister's Global Fellowship programme. The college achieved its first student in the inaugural year of the programme, 2008, and in 2009 had 2 more successful applicants. The school also offers programmes such as The Duke of Edinburgh's Award. Bishop Milner has also undertaken major charitable initiatives, including Project Gambia, which took Year 11 students and staff to Gambia to help build housing and hospital facilities. In 2025, Bishop Milner became part of the St Gabriel Archangel Trust.

== Notable former pupils ==
Former pupils of Bishop Milner have been historically known as Old Milnerians.

List of Old Milnerians:

- Kyle Edwards - Professional footballer
- Reanne Evans (b. 1985) - 12 time World Women's Snooker Champion (2005-2014, 2016, 2019)
- Richard Forsyth (b. 1970) - Professional footballer
- Andy Holden - Olympian and track and field athlete, representing Great Britain at the 1972 Summer Olympics
- Warren Nettleford - Television presenter/reporter and Royal Television Society Award recipient
- Lembit Öpik - Politician and leader of the Welsh Liberal Democrats
