= Priory Hall, Dudley =

Priory Hall
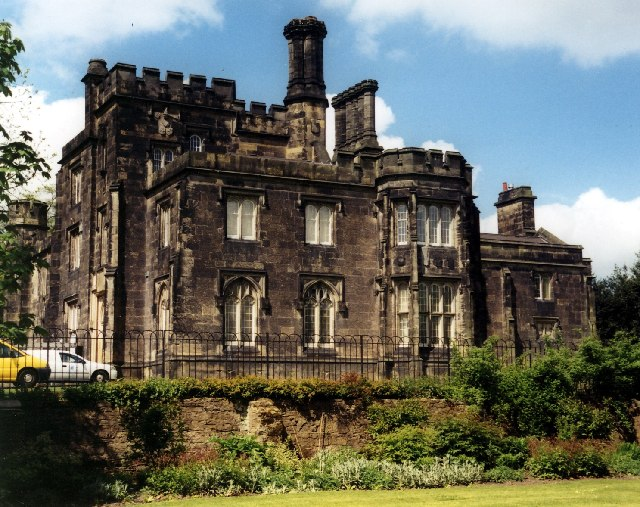

General information
- Status: Grade II listed
- Architectural style: Tudor
- Location: Dudley, West Midlands grid reference SO 942 910
- Coordinates: 52°31′0.5″N 2°5′10.9″W
- Completed: 1825

Priory Hall is a building in Dudley, West Midlands, England, formerly owned by the Earls of Dudley. It is in Priory Park, and is a Grade II listed building.

== History ==
The hall was built in 1825, in the grounds of Dudley Priory. The priory and its estate had been granted, after the Dissolution of the Monasteries, to Edward Sutton, 4th Baron Dudley in 1554.

John Ward, 1st Earl of Dudley, the later inheritor of the estate, built the hall on a site north-west of the remains of the priory. The ruins, which had been occupied by businesses, were cleared of industrial debris and made into a picturesque feature; a driveway was created through the ruins.

The hall was built in Tudor style, with battlements and corner turrets. It was intended as the family residence in Dudley; it became the home of the Earl's mining agent, Francis Downing.

The hall and surrounding land remained the property of the Earls of Dudley until 1926, when it was acquired by Dudley Borough Council. The hall is now Dudley register office.
