= Stevenage Clock Tower =

- Interactive map of Stevenage Clock Tower
- 51°54′06″N 0°12′06″W

History
- Built: 1959

Site notes
- Architect: Leonard Vincent

Listed Building – Grade II
- Designated: 1998
- Reference no.: 1246827

Stevenage Clock Tower is a Grade II listed structure in Town Square in the centre of Stevenage New Town. A panel on the tower records the visit of Elizabeth II in 1959. The Queen unveiled it as part of the ceremony to open the first phase of the town centre.

Designed by Leonard Vincent, the architect of Stevenage Development Corporation, the tower is 19 meters high. It is constructed of reinforced concrete with granite cladding. The fact that the concrete is not exposed gives the design a modernist rather than brutalist appearance. It has been described as "iconic".

In 1974 Harold Wilson unveiled a bronze relief sculpture by Franta Belsky on the west face of the clock tower. It depicts Lewis Silkin, a Labour politician who served as Minister of Town and Country Planning implementing the New Towns Act of 1946 which set up development corporations to construct new towns.

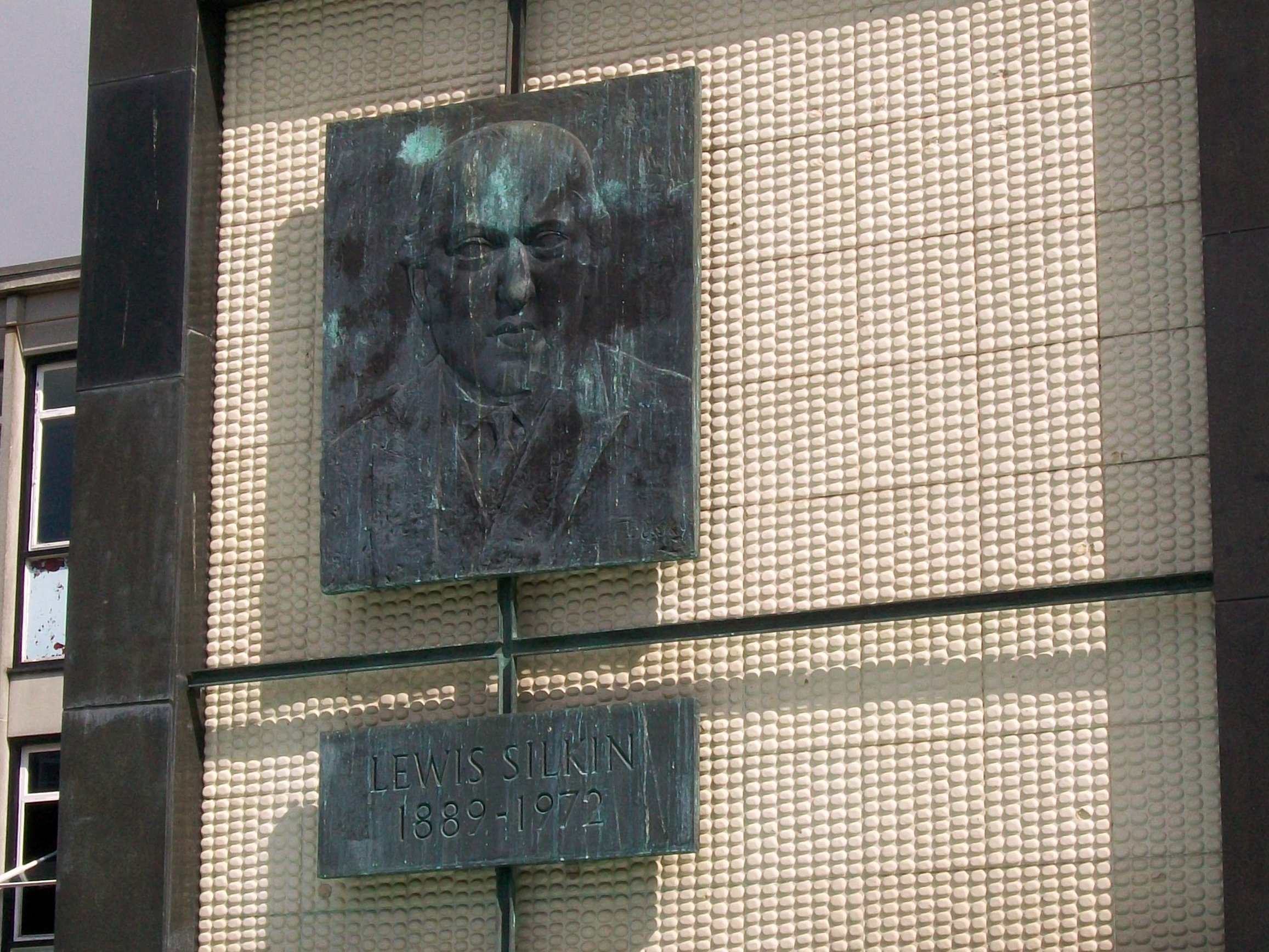
Sculpture of Lewis Silkin

== Protection of the tower and its surroundings ==
The tower is set in a pool with a fountain, which is also protected. The listing in 1998 applied to "clock tower and surrounding raised pool".

Town Square is included in a Conservation Area. There are two other listed structures in Town Square, the sculpture "Joy Ride" by Franta Belsky and a ceramic mural on the former Co-Operative House (now Primark). Like the tower, these examples of public art were created in the 1950s.

== Related structures ==
Stevenage clock tower is reminiscent of other English clock towers of the mid-20th century, such as the earlier Chrisp Street Market Clock Tower and the later Shipley Clock Tower.

Saints Andrew and George Church in Stevenage town centre has a much narrower structure for its bell tower, or campanile as it is usually known (evidently not designed for change-ringing). Basil Spence used a design similar to Stevenage Clock Tower for a series of bell towers in Coventry which were intended to house a ring of bells.

== Regeneration of Stevenage town centre ==
In the 21st century a need has been identified to regenerate the town centre. Planners have looked at Stevenage in the context of town centres across the United Kingdom "undergoing dynamic, often negative changes, leading to high vacancy levels and a deteriorating urban fabric". Historic England regards the Conservation Area as vulnerable and in 2017 included it on the Heritage at Risk Register, where it still remained as at 2025.

New uses are being sought for some buildings. In 2021 "North Block" was redesigned to include co-working space in a refurbishment which respected the original frontages onto Town Square. There are also proposals to include more housing as well as updated shops. While this is unlikely to affect the Clock Tower directly, there is a possible threat to the character of the surrounding buildings, which were designed in accord with clear zoning policies which differentiated shopping centres from industrial areas, residential areas etc.

== Stevenage Clock Tower in art ==
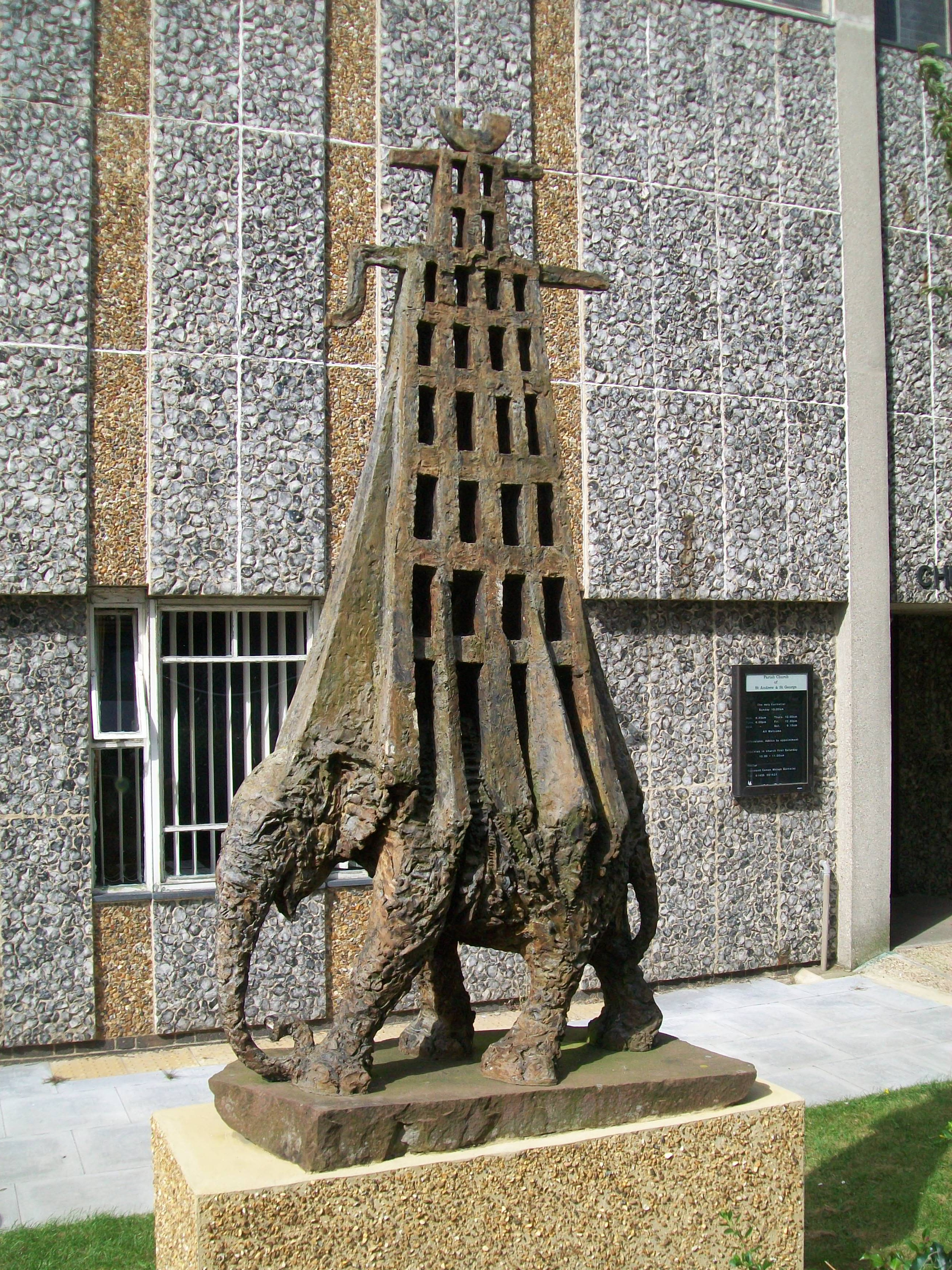
"Urban Elephant" by Andrew Burton

"Urban Elephant" of 1992, is a fibreglass sculpture by Andrew Burton in St George's Way, commissioned by the Stevenage Museum. The tower on the elephant represents the clock tower.
