= Dudley College =

Dudley College of Technology

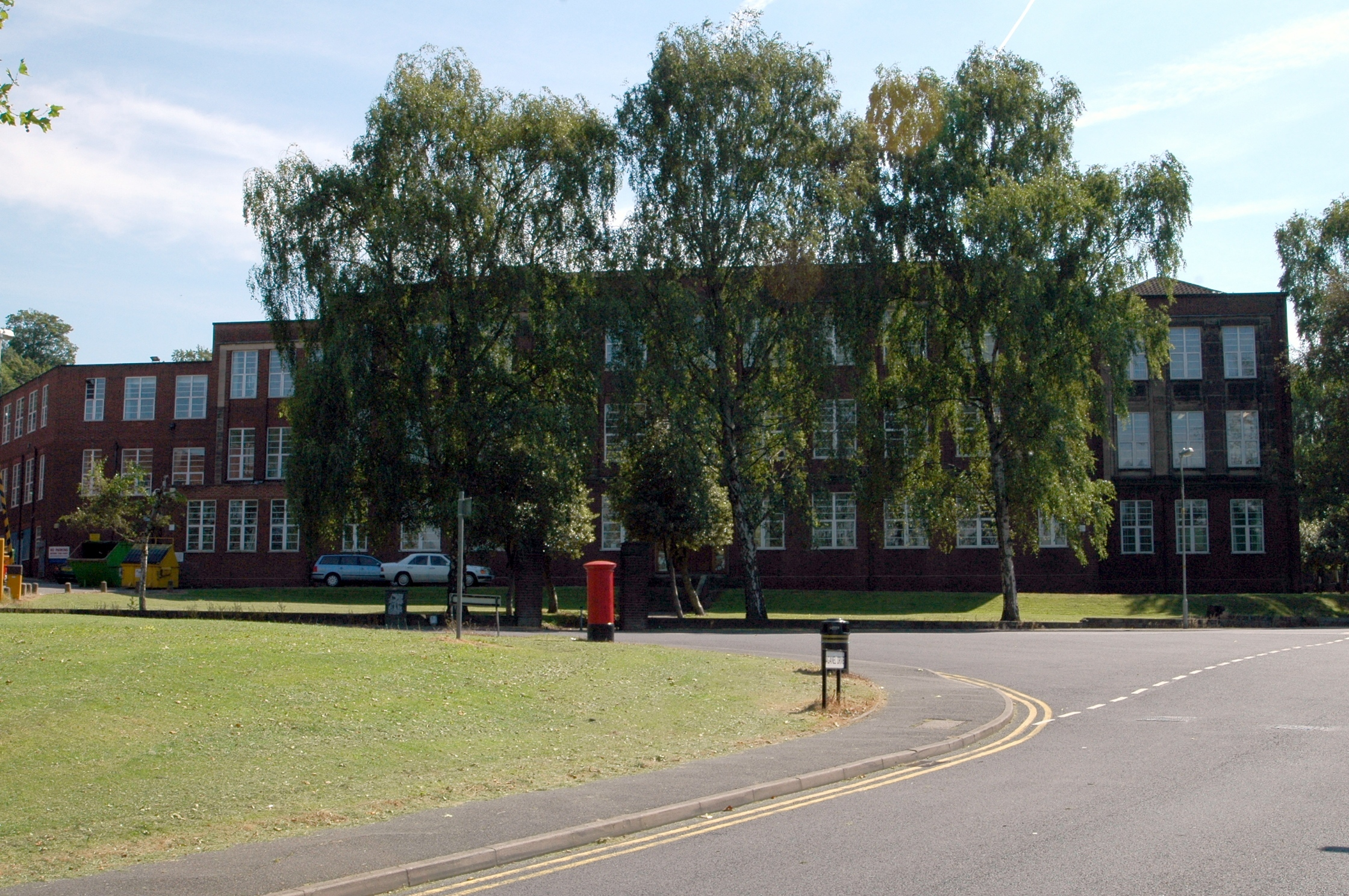
- Main campus

Location
- The Broadway; Dudley, West Midlands, DY1 4AS; England; 52.515°N 2.083°W

Information
- Type: Further Education
- Established: 1936 (current site); 1926 - Dudley Technical College; 1862 - Dudley Mechanics' Institute
- Local authority: Dudley Metropolitan Borough Council
- Department for Education URN: 130475 Tables
- Ofsted: Reports
- Principal: Diana Martin
- Gender: Mixed
- Age: 16+
- Colour
- Website: www.dudleycol.ac.uk

Dudley College of Technology is a further and higher education college based in Dudley, England. The college's history dates to 1862, when the Dudley Public Hall and Mechanics Institute was first built. Since that date the college has continued to provide technical and vocational education. In November 2023 Ofsted rated the college as a good provider. In total the college received a 'good' grade in all of the eight key areas reviewed.

== History ==
In 1862 the Dudley Public Hall and Mechanics Institute was built. In 1896 additional accommodation in Stafford Street was acquired and the institution became Dudley Technical school – renamed the Dudley Technical College in 1928.

1931 building works began to relocate the college on a five-acre site at the Broadway which was officially opened in 1936. This site was further expanded to include facilities for the training in Electrical Engineering, Metallurgy and Meteorology.

In 1966 the college became the sole responsibility of Dudley Council. A period of further expansion took place during the 1960s and 1970s with facilities for Motor Vehicle and Hydraulic training being created. In 1973 HRH Duchess of Kent opened an additional center at Brierley Hill for skills training for the glass industry.

In 2002, Dudley College acquired the University of Wolverhampton's campus at Castle View in the Eve Hill area of Dudley. The newer buildings were retained as part of the college, but the oldest building (dating from 1905) was demolished and is now occupied by a development of private houses and flats.

In recent years the college has continued to expand to meet increased demand with the creation of the Dudley Learning Quarter encompassing Dudley Evolve and Dudley Sixth, Aspire Living and Aspire Works as well as bespoke centres for Engineering and Built Technologies named Advance I and Advance II. The Learning Quarter also hosts a 3G all weather football complex, which is used by students and the wider community.

== Notable alumni ==
- Bill Etheridge, UK Independence Party MEP
- Nichola Hanson-Jones, Photographer
- Duane Henry, Actor known for NCIS
- Matthew Hudson-Smith, Olympian and Team GB athlete
- Stuart Lampitt, Cricketer
- Gregory Piper, Actor known for Line of Duty
- Vee Kativhu
