= Vee Kativhu =

British-Zimbabwean education activist

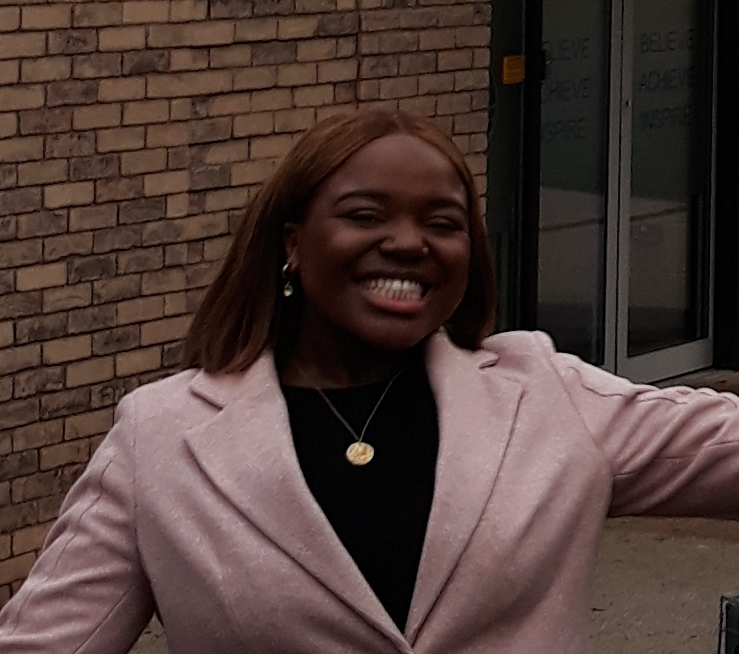
- Kativhu in 2021
- Born: Varaidzo Kativhu; Zimbabwe
- Education: Dudley College, Lady Margaret Hall, Harvard University (Ed.M), Claremont Graduate University
- Occupations: Activist; speaker; author
- Awards: Diana Award (2021)

Varaidzo "Vee" Kativhu is a British-Zimbabwean girls' education activist, international speaker, author, and social-media personality. She received a Diana Award in 2021 and was listed on the BBC's 100 Women list in 2023.

== Early life and education ==
Kativhu was born in Zimbabwe and grew up speaking Shona. At the age of seven, following the death of her father, she and her sister moved to England to join their mother. At the age of twelve, the family relocated to Pontypridd, Wales, before later moving to the West Midlands in England.

Kativhu attended Dudley College and went on to study classical archaeology and ancient history at Lady Margaret Hall at the University of Oxford. In 2021, she graduated with a master's degree in international education policy from Harvard University, completing her studies online due to the COVID-19 pandemic. She subsequently pursued doctoral research in educational leadership at Claremont Graduate University in California, graduating in 2026.

== Career ==
While studying at Oxford in 2017, she launched a YouTube channel, vlogging about her university experiences. Her friend and fellow student Malala Yousafzai appeared in several of her videos.

Kativhu later founded Empowered by Vee, an initiative aimed at making higher education more accessible for students from underrepresented and financially disadvantaged backgrounds. In 2021, she published a self-help book, titled Empowered: Live Your Life with Passion and Purpose.

== Awards and recognition ==
In 2021, Kativhu received the Diana Award and was selected by the United Nations as a Young Leader for the Sustainable Development Goals. She was named to the BBC's 100 Women list in 2023 as one of the world's inspiring and influential women. In 2024, Kativhu was awarded an honorary degree by the University of Bradford.

== Publications ==
- Kativhu, Vee (2021). Empowered: Live Your Life with Passion and Purpose. London: Penguin Random House UK imprint Square Peg. ISBN 978-1529110456.

She has also written opinion pieces on global education and climate action for platforms including The New Humanitarian.
