= Carl Chinn =

British historian, author and broadcaster

Carl Chinn MBE DL
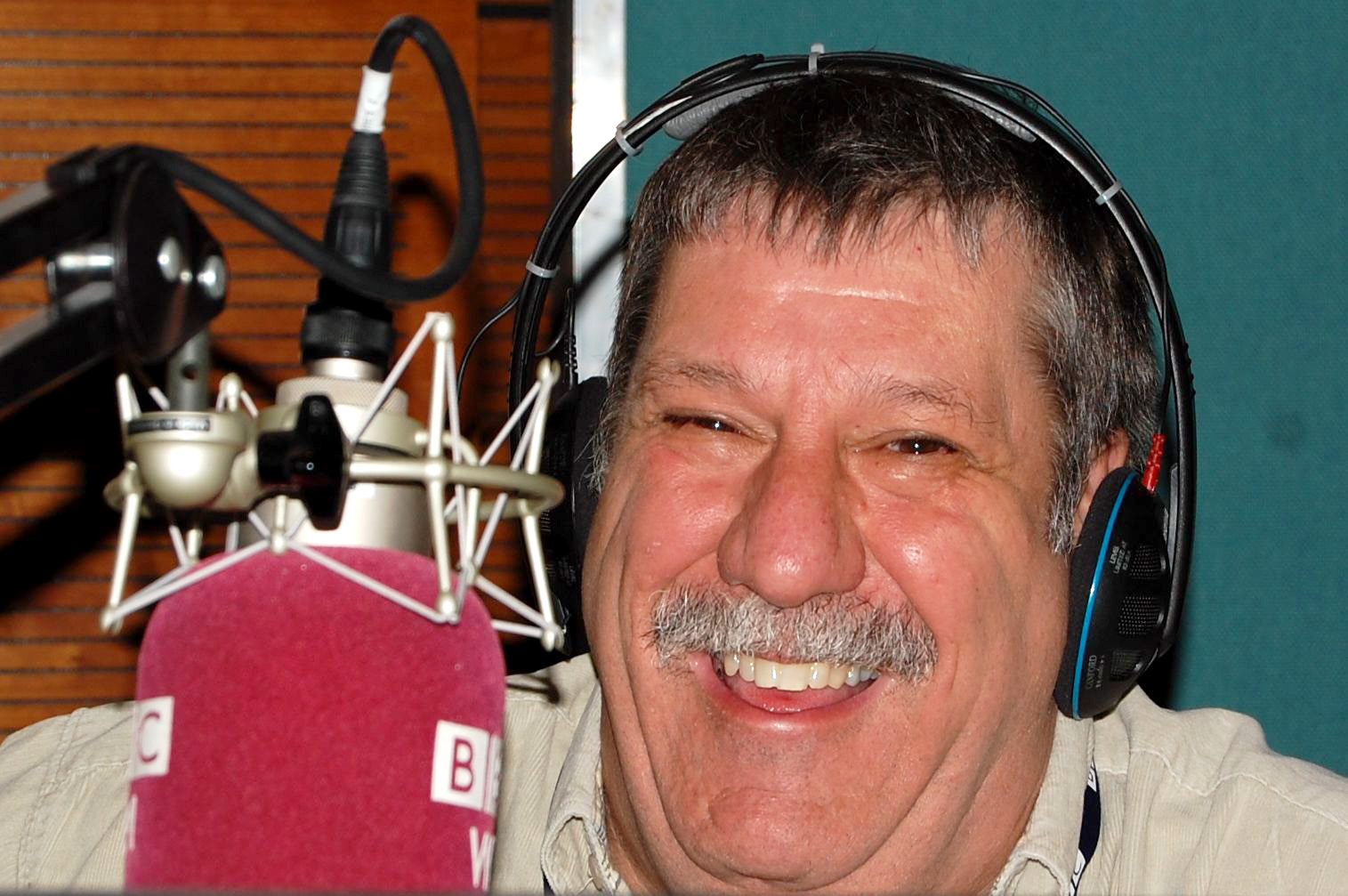
- Chinn in 2011
- Born: 6 September 1956 (age 69); Moseley, Birmingham, England
- Occupations: Historian; author; radio presenter; magazine editor; newspaper columnist
- Spouse: Kathleen Doyle (m. 1978)
- Children: 4
- Chinn's voice On the significance of Birmingham's marketplaces First published 7 September 2011
- Website: Carl Chinn’s Brum

Carl Steven Alfred Chinn MBE DL (born 6 September 1956) is an English historian, author and radio presenter whose working life has been devoted to the study and popularisation of the city of Birmingham. He broadcast a programme on the BBC from the mid-1990s focusing on Birmingham's history.

In 1990, he was contracted to lecture at the University of Birmingham, where he subsequently became a full professor in 2002. During this year he was appointed a Member of the Order of the British Empire (MBE) for his "services to local history and to charities".

== Early life ==
Chinn was born at Sorrento Hospital in Moseley, Birmingham. His father, Alfred (died 26 April 2010), was known as "Buck" and was a notable football supporter and local activist from Sparkbrook. His mother, Sylvia, was known as "Sylvie" and was from Aston. Chinn grew up in Birmingham and was educated at Moseley School and the University of Birmingham.

== Career ==
Chinn initially followed his father and grandfather into bookmaking before entering academia, gaining his PhD in 1986.

His work in the community made him a popular figure, and in 1994 he was invited by the Birmingham Evening Mail to write a two-page feature on local history. This proved extremely popular and Chinn wrote a weekly column for the paper until 2016.

Chinn held the position of Professor of Community History at the University of Birmingham until 2015 and is now Emeritus Professor. He was also Director of the Birmingham Lives multimedia archive at UoB (formerly at South Birmingham College). He is the author of over thirty books on the history of Birmingham and the urban working class in England. He often appears on local television programmes such as Midlands Today; and wrote a weekly local history column for the Express & Star. He presented a weekly radio programme on BBC Radio WM from 1994 until it was axed in 2013. He has made three videos and provided spoken links on two CDs of songs about Birmingham.

In 2000 Chinn was a leading figure in the temporarily successful, but eventually doomed, campaign to save the Longbridge car factory from closure. In the 2001 Birthday Honours, he was appointed Member of the Order of the British Empire (MBE) "for services to the community, especially Local History, in the West Midlands." When the rebuilt Bull Ring was opened in 2003 Chinn criticised it for the lack of concern its developers and planners had shown towards market traders who had been the mainstay of the Bull Ring for the 800 years up to 1964, when the much-criticised previous shopping centre was built on the site. Chinn has also been prominent in the campaigns to save the last back-to-back houses in Birmingham, now a National Trust museum in Inge Street; and for a memorial to the victims of the Second World War Blitz on the city, sited in Edgbaston Street in the Bull Ring. In October 2007 he became patron of the St John's Church Preservation Group, which is campaigning for the reopening of St John's Church, Dudley.

In December 2010 he appeared on Ian Hislop's BBC television show Age of the Do-Gooders, in which he championed George Dawson; a "non-conformist preacher, and a bit of a showman". He has also appeared on the BBC's Question Time. In 2020 appeared in 'Britains' Biggest Dig' in BBC 4 television mini series exploring HS2 archaeology dig in Birmingham.

== Politics ==
In the 1980s he was briefly a member of the Social Democratic Party, which broke from Labour in protest at its perceived leftward shift, and later went on to merge with the Liberal Party to form the Liberal Democrats. He stood in the 1983 general election in Birmingham Sparkbrook as an independent, campaigning for import controls to protect local industry, and more investment in council housing. He came last with 281 votes (0.9%).

== Personal life ==
Chinn married Kathleen Doyle in 1978; they have a son and three daughters, one of whom, Tara, has sung professionally on stage with her father.

Chinn is a supporter of Aston Villa FC and has a season ticket at Villa Park.

Chinn is a descendant of Peaky Blinders gangster Edward Derrick. In 2023, he was appointed a deputy lieutenant of the West Midlands.

== Bibliography ==
- They Worked All Their Lives: Women of the Urban Poor in England, 1880–1939 (1988). Manchester University Press. ISBN 0-7190-2437-4.
- Homes For People: Council Housing and Urban Renewal in Birmingham 1840–1999 (1989). Birmingham Books. Expanded and revised edition (1999). Brewin Books. ISBN 1-85858-138-9.
- Keeping the City Alive: Twenty-one years of Urban Renewal in Birmingham (1993). Birmingham City Council.
- Birmingham: The Great Working City (1994). Birmingham City Council.
- Poverty Amidst Prosperity: Urban Poor in England, 1834–1914 (1995). Manchester University Press. ISBN 0-7190-3990-8.
- Brum Undaunted: Birmingham During the Blitz (1996). Birmingham Library Services.
- Our Brum (1997). Birmingham Evening Mail.
- The Cadbury Story: A Short History (1998). Brewin Books. ISBN 1-85858-105-2.
- Our Brum: Volume 2 (1998). Birmingham Evening Mail. ISBN 0-9534316-0-6.
- 1,000 Years of Brum (1999). Birmingham Evening Mail.
- From Little Acorns Grow: History of the West Bromwich Building Society (1999). Brewin Books. ISBN 1-85858-124-9.
- Our Brum: Volume 3 (1999). Birmingham Evening Mail.
- Brum and Brummies (2000). Brewin Books. ISBN 1-85858-181-8.
- We Ain't Going Away!: The Battle for Longbridge (2000). Brewin Books. Co-authored with Steve Dyson. ISBN 1-85858-174-5.
- Proper Brummie: A Dictionary of Birmingham Words and Sayings (2001). Brewin Books. Co-authored with Stephen Thorne. ISBN 1-85858-227-X.
- Brum and Brummies: Volume 2 (2001). Brewin Books. ISBN 1-85858-202-4.
- Birmingham: Bibliography of a City (ed.) (2001). University of Birmingham Press. ISBN 1-902459-24-5.
- Brum and Brummies: Volume 3 (2002). Brewin Books. ISBN 1-85858-213-X.
- Birmingham Irish: Making Our Mark (2003). Birmingham City Council. ISBN 0-7093-0241-X.
- The Streets of Brum: Part One (2003). Brewin Books. ISBN 1-85858-245-8.
- Better Betting with a Decent Feller: A Social History of Bookmaking (2004). Aurum Press. ISBN 1-84513-009-X.
- Black Country Memories (2004). Brewin Books. ISBN 1-85858-266-0.
- The Streets of Brum: Part Two (2004). Brewin Books. ISBN 1-85858-262-8.
- Peaky Blinders: The Real Story – The new true history of Birmingham's most notorious gangs. London: John Blake Publishing Ltd. 2019. ISBN 9781789461725. OCLC 1136540063.
- Peaky Blinders: The Legacy – The real story of Britain's most notorious 1920's gangs. London: John Blake Publishing Ltd. 2020. ISBN 9781789462937.
- Peaky Blinders: The Aftermath – The real story behind the next generation of British gangsters. London: John Blake Publishing Ltd. 2021. ISBN 9781789464511. OCLC 1309300519.
