= Warren Nettleford =

English television presenter

- Born: Dudley, England
- Occupations: Television presenter Reporter

Warren Nettleford is an English television presenter and reporter from Dudley in the West Midlands. He is of Black British heritage.

== Education ==
He attended Bishop Milner RC School in Dudley (now Bishop Milner Catholic College) where he was Deputy Head Boy.

He attended Lancaster University where he read History and Politics and was a member of The County College.

In his final year he was elected as the Students Union President at Lancaster University

He also studied journalism at City University in London.

== Career ==
Warren began his career working in current affairs and factual television, including BBC Newsnight, before becoming a News Trainee at Channel 4 News.

After leaving Channel 4 News he worked for several years as a roving reporter at BBC London TV News. He moved to Channel 5 News where he presented the news bulletins in 2014 and 2015.

In Winter 2015 he started the media production company Right Thing Films.

Warren continues to report for Channel 5 News. In August 2019 he was appointed as Trustee for the charity, Christians in Media.

In February 2021 Warren won a Royal Television Society Award for journalism for the political series NEED TO KNOW alongside former Snapchat Executive Seth Goolnik. The judges praised their ability to "make political journalism engaging for young people."
