= The County College, Lancaster =

Constituent college of the University of Lancaster

Coordinates: 54.0126°N 2.7843°W

The County College
- University of Lancaster
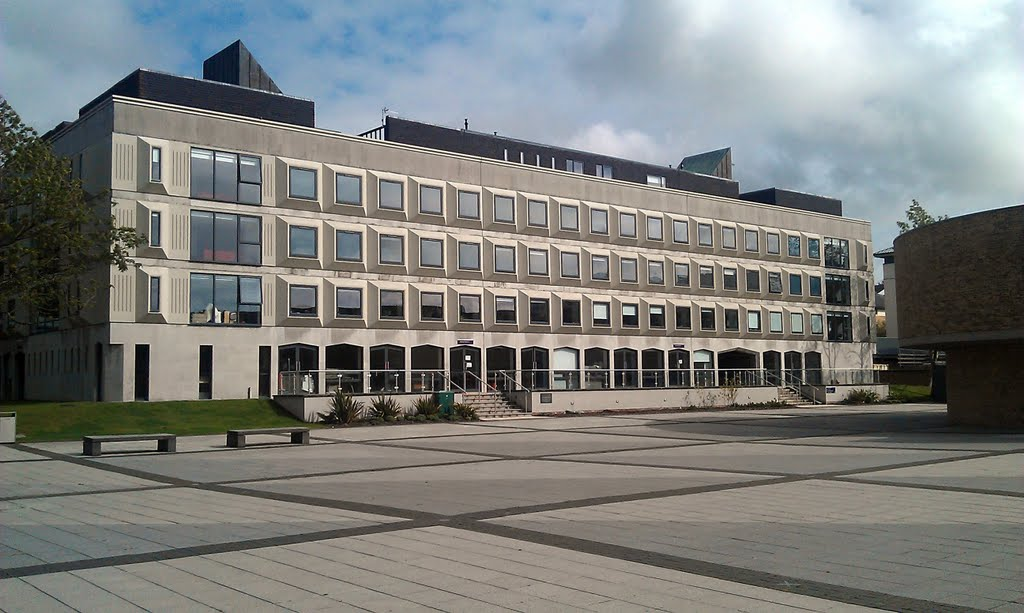

- Motto: Sine Consilio Nihil (Latin)
- Motto in English: Nothing Without Counsel
- Established: 1967
- Named for: Lancashire County Council
- Colours: Blue; Yellow
- Sister college: Halifax College, York
- JCR President: Yasir Shahbaz
- Vice principal: Vacant
- Dean: Stuart Powers
- Undergraduates: 1900
- Website: The County College; The County JCR

The County College, also known as County College or County, is a constituent college of the University of Lancaster. The establishment of the college was financed through the benefaction of Lancashire County Council and it is named after it. The original college building, County Main, was opened by The Queen in 1969.

== History ==
County college was the only college to be named after its benefactors, the County Council, who donated a generous sum of money towards its construction and promised to donate £50,000 a year for ten years towards the university's running costs. A commemorative plaque situated outside the college office remembers their generous contribution. It was decided that County college should be based upon the old Oxonian idea of building colleges around a quadrangle because it adds to the collegiate nature of the university and expresses the idea of an individual community. The only way that a square could be incorporated into County was around an old oak tree that had been spared as a sapling by an agricultural labourer over 200 years ago. This original college building is now known as County Main. The building was erected around the tree without damage to its roots. The college is very conscious of its responsibility for the health of the tree and beneath its shade are two bench seats erected in memory of two former College Officers.

== Expansion ==
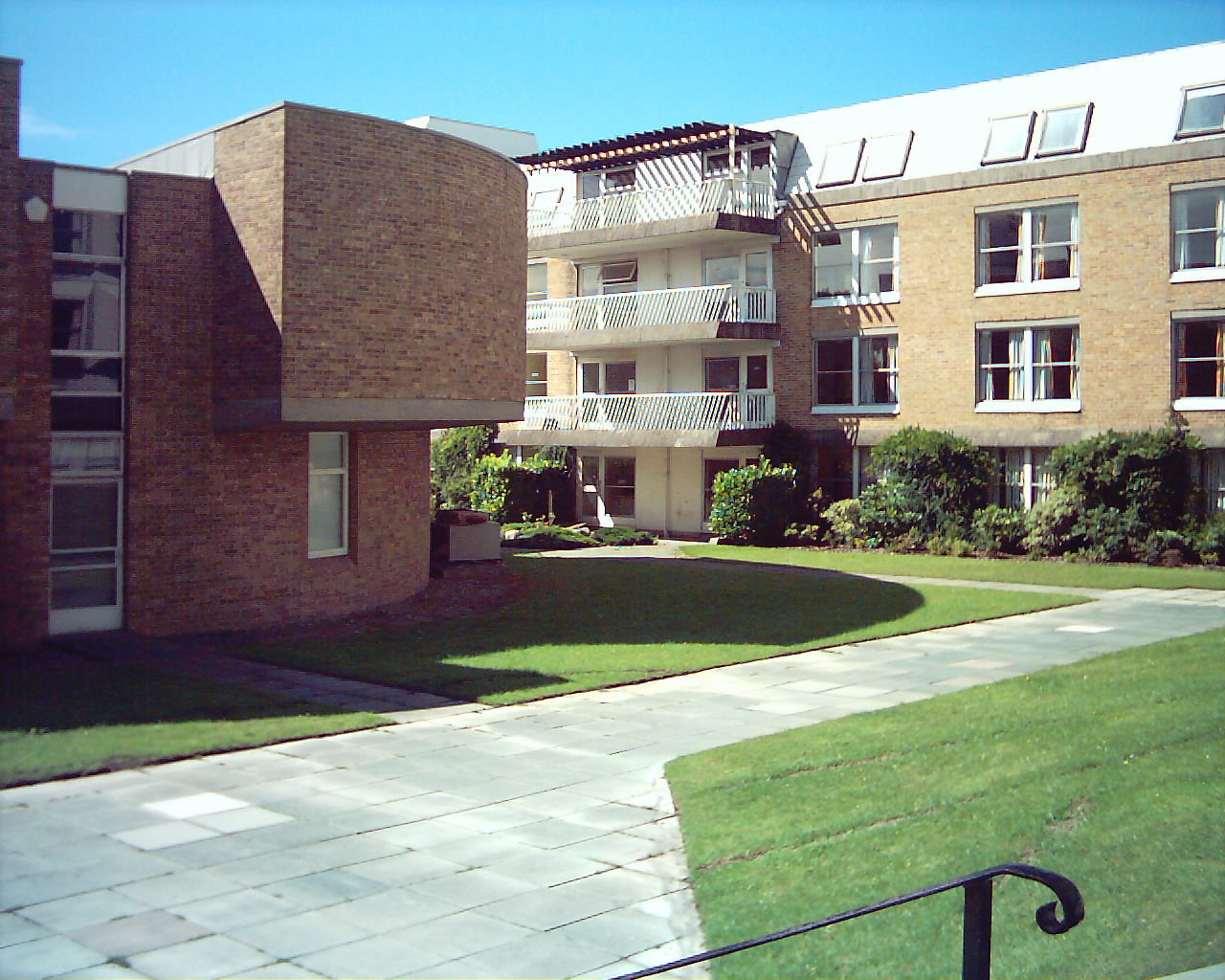
The Roundhouse (foreground, left) and County West (background), before its demolition.

The college residences were expanded in 1978 with the construction of County West. In 2004 the college further expanded, after being granted buildings that had been vacated by Cartmel College. These buildings have since been renovated and named County South and now house a relocated college bar. In October 2006 County South expanded with the opening of three large residence houses built on the site of demolished Cartmel College residence blocks. County West was demolished in August 2007 and in January 2008 the new construction of the 'Townhouses' on County Field was completed. Following this expansion, the existing 'County Main' block was also renovated to include modern standard accommodation on the top two floors and classrooms and offices on the bottom two floors.

== Symbols ==
An oak leaf is used as a symbol of the college, and it is included on its coat of arms which was granted by the College of Arms. The college colours are blue and yellow. The college unofficial motto is Do it for The Tree.

== Sport ==
The college partakes in all of the inter-college sport events and competitions which are an integral part of collegiate life. These competitions relate to the Carter Shield and the George Wyatt Trophy. The college darts, pool, football and netball teams have all achieved much over recent years with the women winning all three of their events in the 2006 George Wyatt Trophy and the retaining their darts title in 2007 and 2008, giving County Ladies darts 3 wins in a row. As well as Men's B-team pool and Dominoes also winning their leagues in 2008. County College is noted for its football teams and their particular "bar golf" championship. For the first time in 2009, members of the college will be able to compete in an intra-college sports event for the Michael Mullet Shield - named after a former Principal and a founding father of the college. Each residential area of the college (Main, South, Creed, Town Houses and off campus) will vie for the shield in a number of sporting events. As of 2010 County also participates in the Legends Shield, which was originally a four-way competition with Fylde, Pendle and Grizedale colleges. The 2011 competition, however, did not feature Grizedale. The sports range from Wii Sports to hockey to bar sports. In 2011 the football's A, B and C teams were successful in winning all summer cups and in 2012 the A and B teams managed to retain the titles with the C team losing a hotly contested final. In 2013 the combined County football teams won 5 out of the 6 possible inter-college trophies.

== Gallery ==
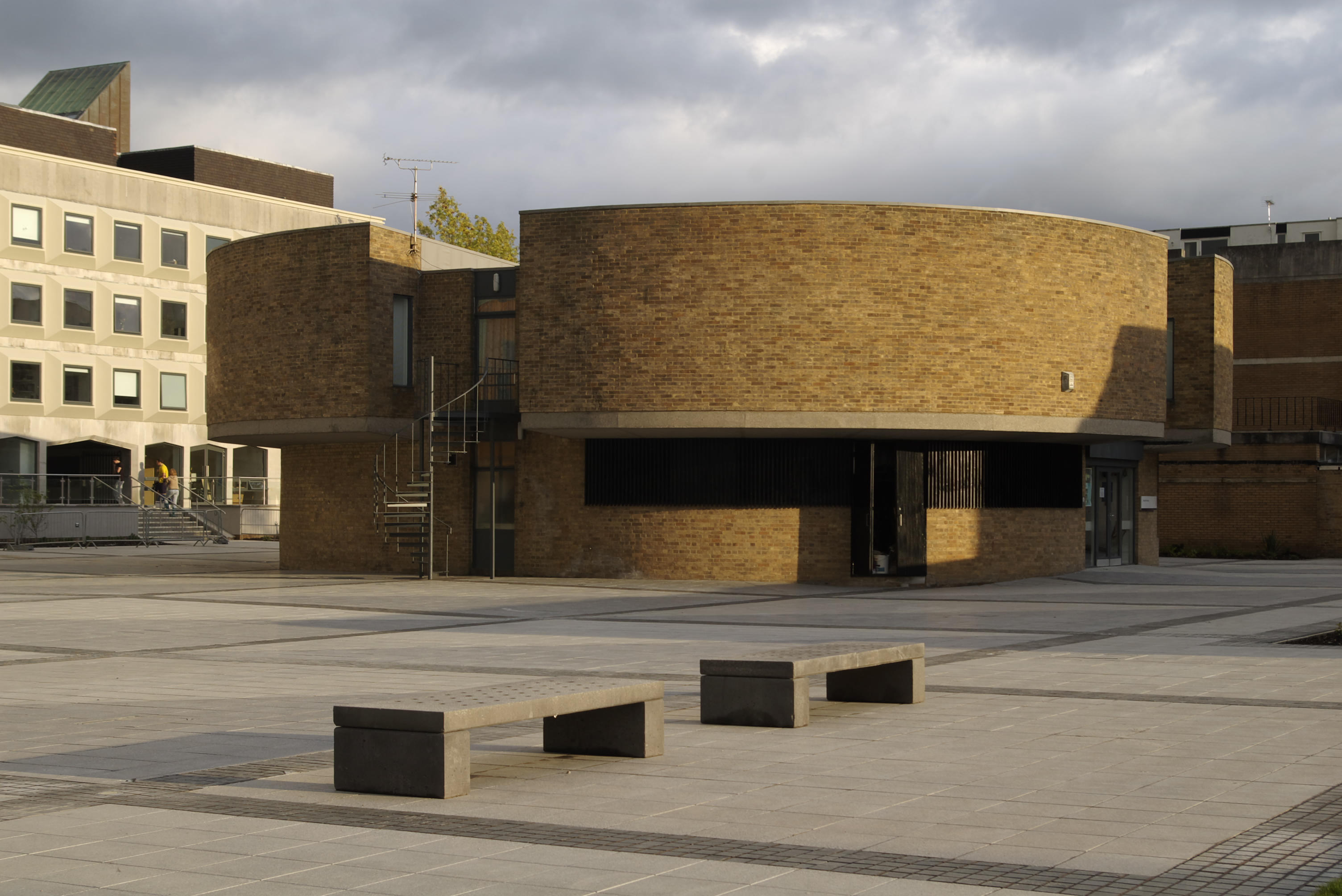
County Main (left) and the Roundhouse (centre)

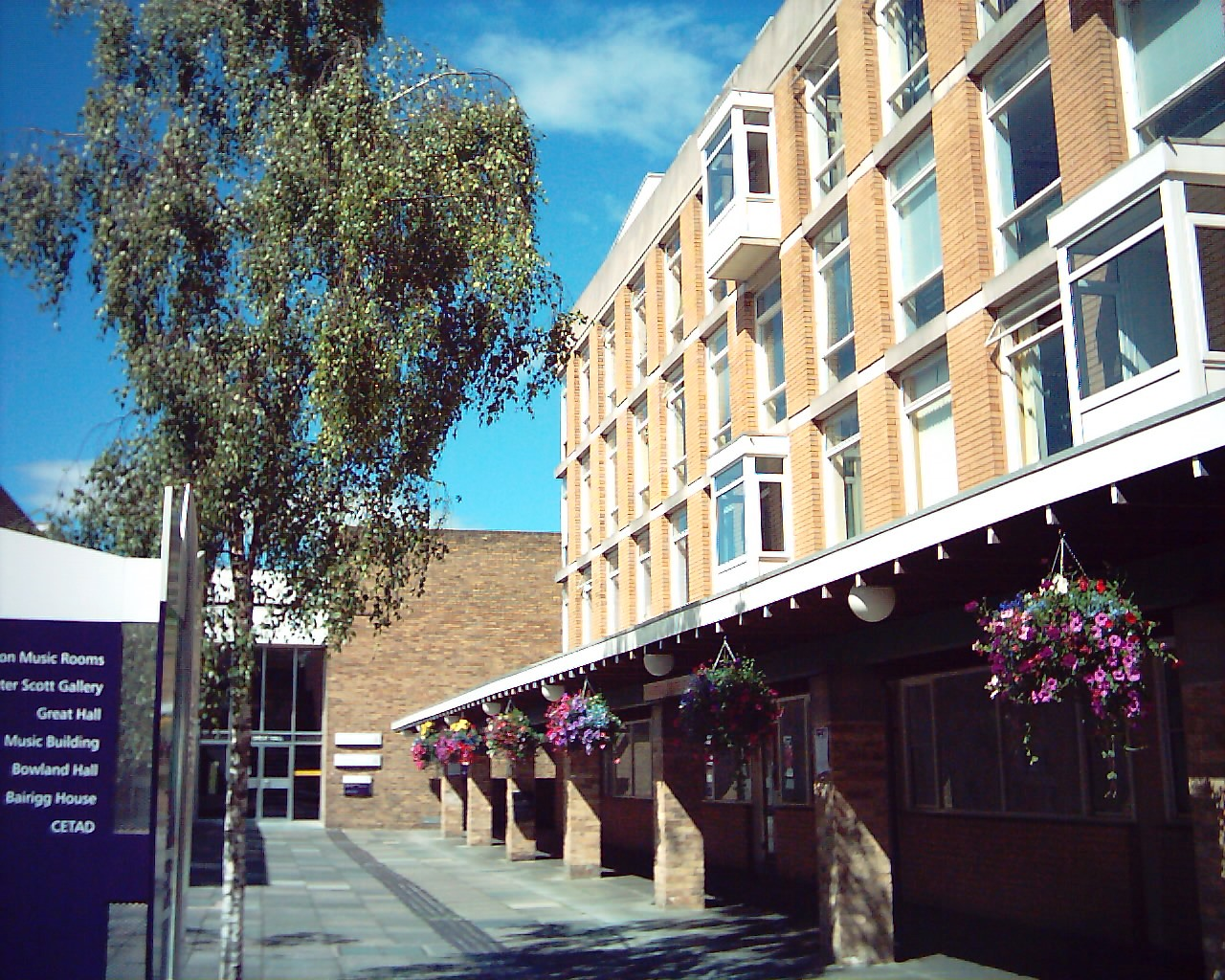
County South (pictured in 2005)

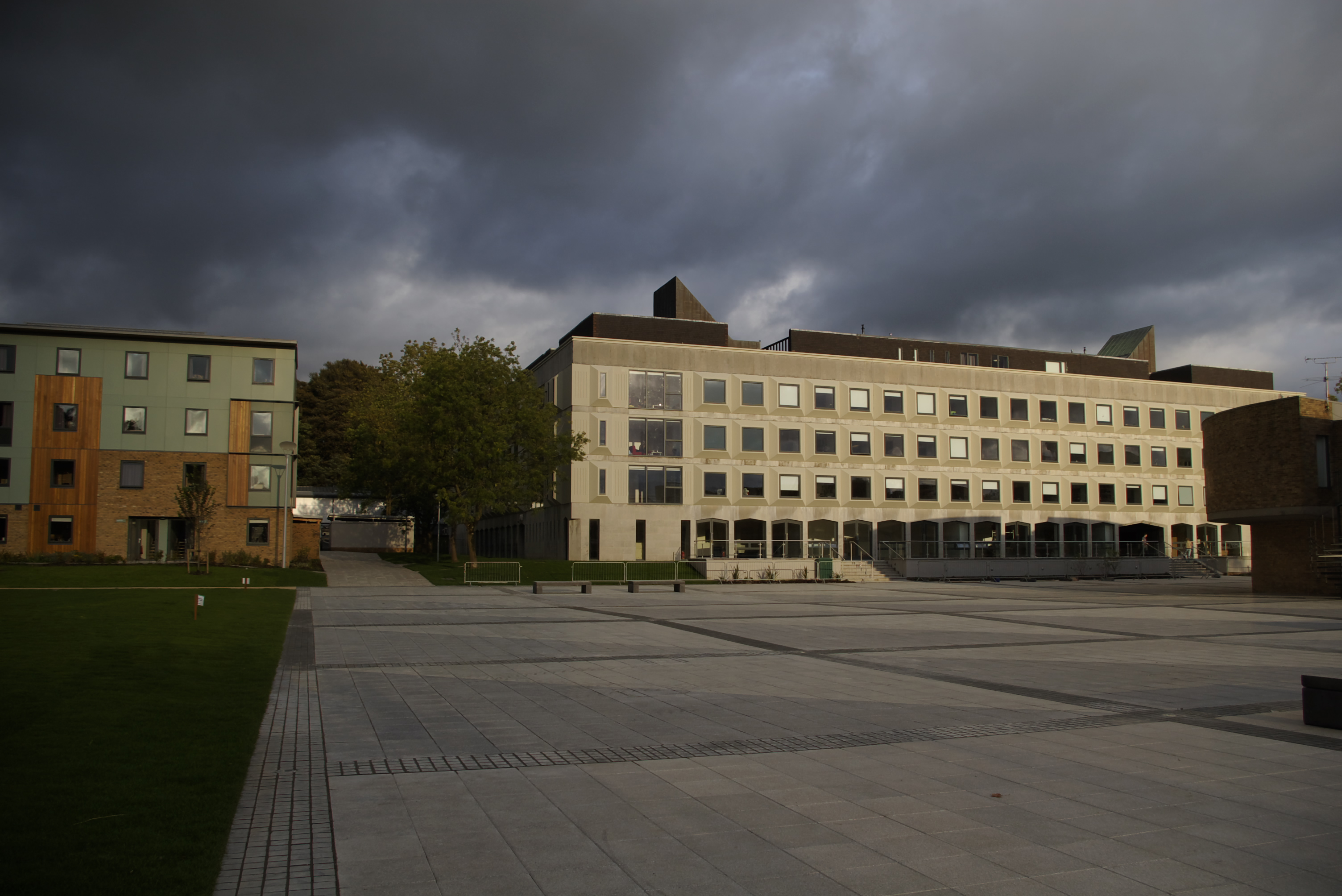
A County Field townhouse (left), Lancaster Square (foregound, centre), and County Main (right)

== Governance ==
The College Syndicate is responsible to the Council of the University of Lancaster for the good governance of the college. The syndicate meets once each academic year. and is composed of the entire Senior Common Room and the Junior Common Room Executive Committee. The current President of the Junior Common Room is Callum Slater, who was elected by the students of the college.

The day-to-day running of the college is carried out by the college Executive Committee, which is a sub-committee of the College Syndicate. The Executive Committee is composed of the College Officers and the JCR Executive. The College Executive committee meets three or four times a term.

=== College Officers ===
- Principal: Rachel Fligelstone
- Vice-Principal: Vacant
- Dean: Stuart Powers
- College Manager: Ali Moorhouse

== Notable alumni ==
- Andy Serkis, actor
- Warren Nettleford, television presenter and reporter
- Dave Snowden, knowledge management researcher and consultant
