= Priory Park, Dudley =

Public park in Dudley, West Midlands, England

Priory Park
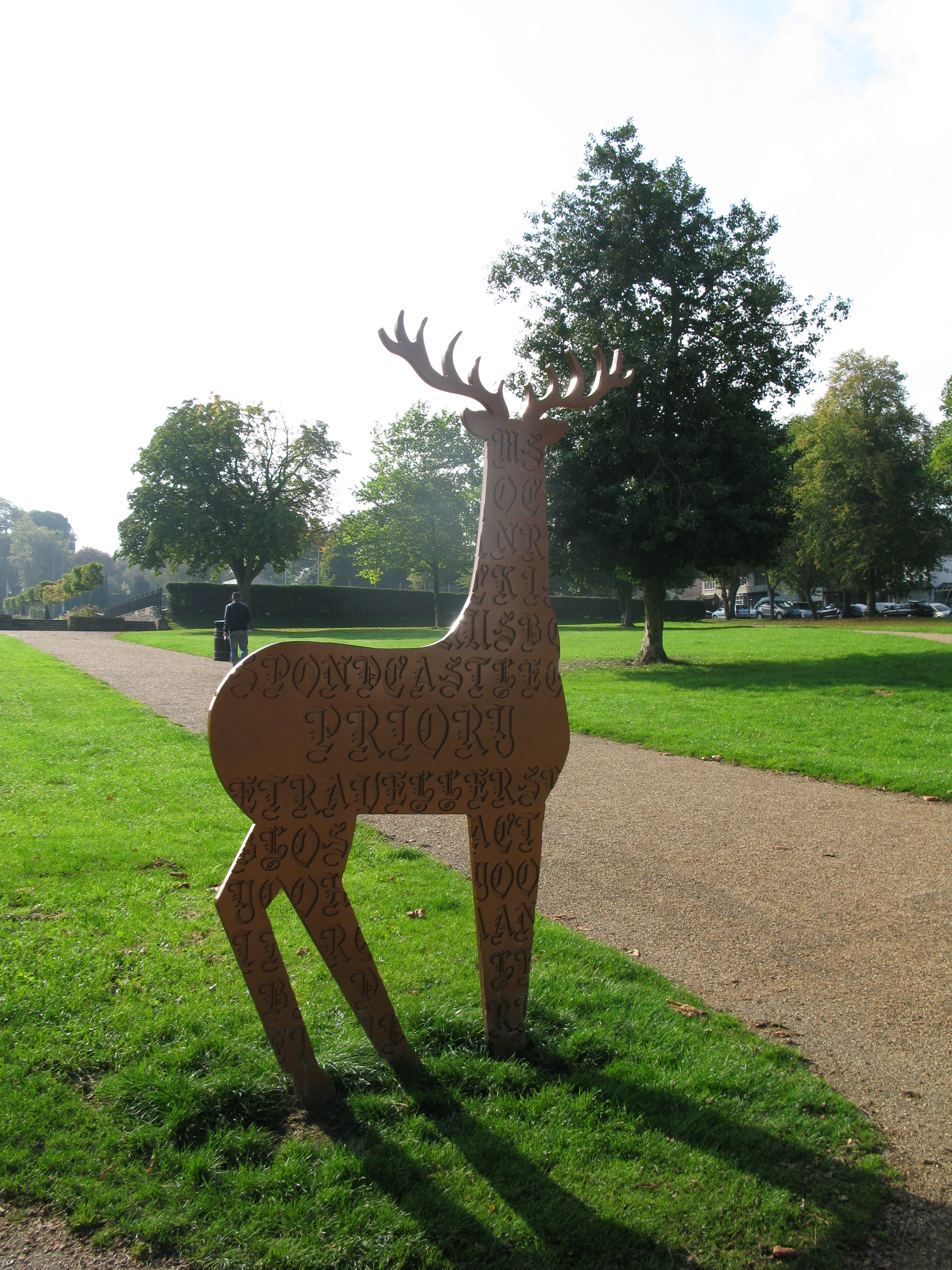
- Stag sculpture at the entrance to Priory Park
- Interactive map of Priory Park
- Location: Dudley, West Midlands
- Nearest city: Wolverhampton
- Coordinates: 52.517°N 2.086°W
- Area: 7.7 hectares (19 acres)
- Created: 1932
- Operator: Dudley Metropolitan Borough Council
- Status: Grade II listed

Priory Park is a public park located in Dudley, West Midlands, England, just north of the town centre. It is in the historic grounds of Dudley Priory.

== Description ==
The park covers an area of 7.7 hectares (19 acres). It has a wooded area, playing fields and a lily pond. It also has tennis and basketball courts, a bowling green, a cricket area a five-a-side football pitch and an orienteering course.

It is listed Grade II in English Heritage's Register of Historic Parks and Gardens of Special Historic Interest, and it is a Green Flag Award winner.

== History ==
The park is on the site of a Cluniac priory founded about 1180 by Gervase Paganell, baron and lord of Dudley Castle. In the late medieval period it was customary for the Barons Dudley to be buried here.

The priory and its estate were granted, after the Dissolution of the Monasteries, to Edward Sutton, 4th Baron Dudley in 1554. The site fell into decline and stone was taken for constructing local houses; manufacturing businesses occupied parts of the site.

John Ward, 1st Earl of Dudley, the later inheritor of the estate, built Priory Hall in 1825, on a site north-west of the remains of the priory. The ruins were cleared of industrial debris and made into a picturesque feature; a driveway to the hall was created through the ruins.

=== Twentieth century and later ===
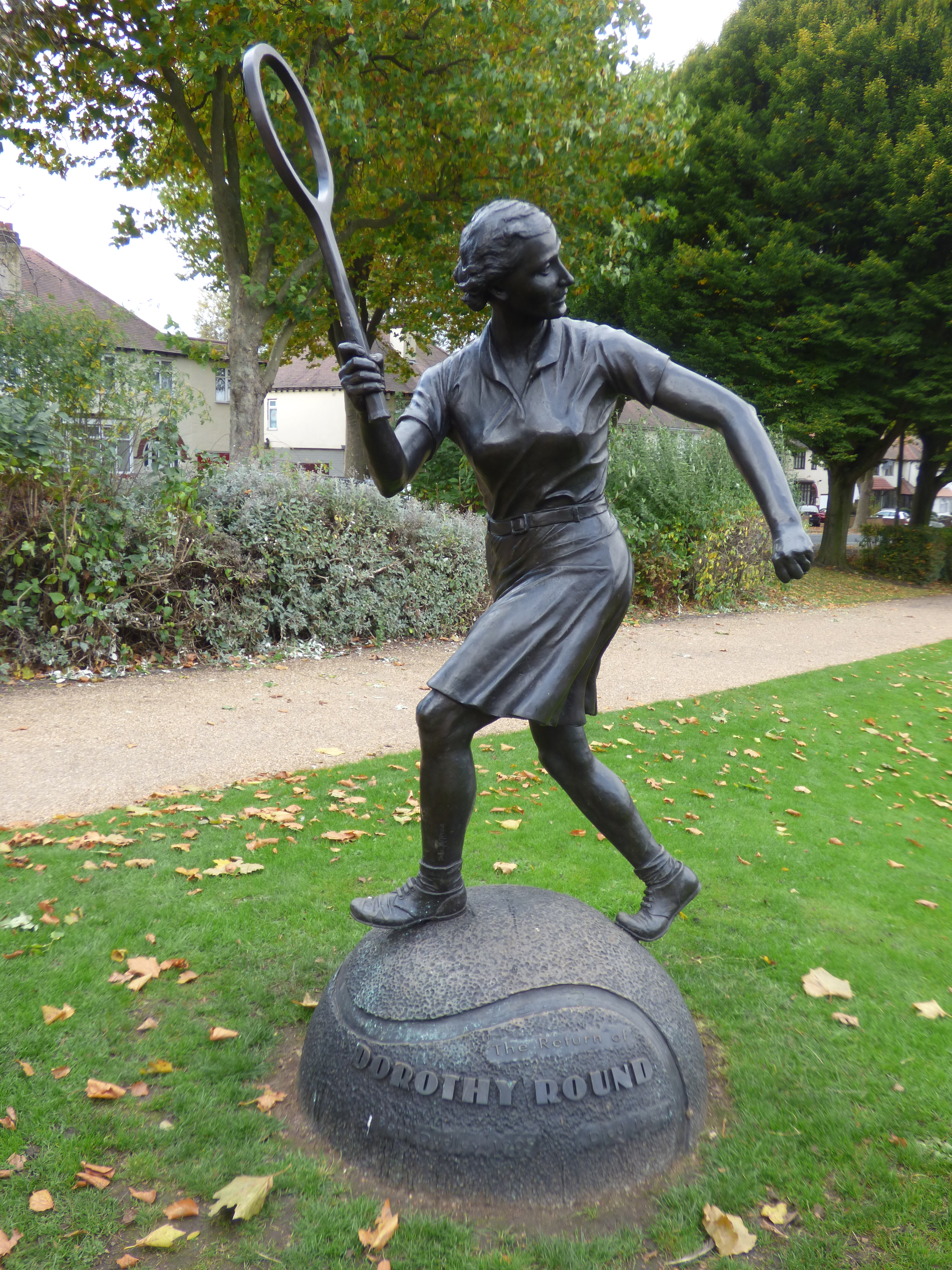
Statue of Dorothy Round in Priory Park

The hall and surrounding land remained the property of the Earls of Dudley until 1926, when it was acquired by Dudley Borough Council. Edward Prentice Mawson was commissioned to develop the site, creating a housing estate – Priory Estate – and a public park. The park, retaining the ornamental ground south of the hall, included walks, flower beds, sports pitches, shelters, lawns and hedges; it was opened in 1932.

A restoration project for the park, supported by the National Lottery Heritage Fund, was completed in 2017. Restoration work included extending and refurbishing the pavilion; installing new benches; restoring paths, shrub areas and the rose garden; creation of a 5-a-side pitch and restoration of the bowling green; and installing a statue of the Dudley-born tennis player Dorothy Round.
