= Gregory Piper (actor) =

British actor

- Born: March 15, 1998 (age 28); United Kingdom
- Occupation: Actor
- Years active: 2012–present
- Television: Line of Duty

Gregory Tyler Piper (born 15 March 1998) is a British actor best known for playing Ryan Pilkington in Line of Duty.

== Line of Duty ==
He was 13 years old when he first appeared in Line of Duty series 1 playing young criminal Ryan Pilkington.

Following complaints from some viewers, Ofcom found that the BBC had made a "serious lapse" in its duty of care for Piper by "failing to ensure that a child welfare counsellor or psychologist had considered the appropriateness or potential emotional risk to the boy of his involvement", given the violent nature of some of his scenes.

Piper reprised the role as a more prominent antagonist in series 5, initially as a member of the Organised Crime Group (OCG) and latterly as a Central Police cadet. In series 6, Pilkington appears more extensively as an officer in the murder investigation team secretly working as a mole for the organised crime syndicate before being killed off in the fifth episode.

== Filmography ==
Year	Title	Role	Notes
2012, 2019–2021	Line of Duty	Ryan Pilkington	Series 1, 5 & 6
2013	Frankie	Richard Preston	Series 1, Episode 3
2021	Fixed (2021)	Jimmy Clemance	Thriller

== Awards and nominations ==
Year	Association	Category	Nominee(s)	Result	Ref.
2012 Royal Television Society Midlands Awards	Line of Duty (series 1)	Best Acting Newcomer	Gregory Piper	Won	
