= Eve Hill =

Area of Dudley, West Midlands, England

Coordinates: 52.5167°N 2.0987°W

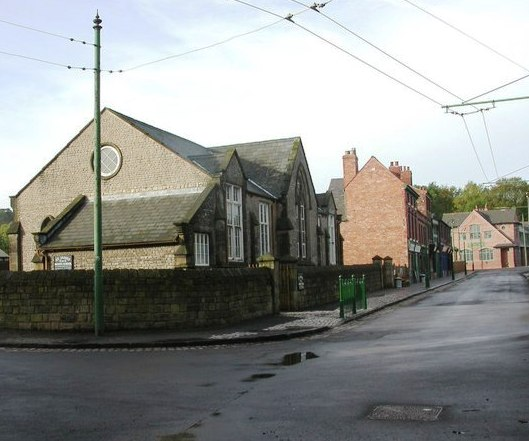
St James' School, built 1842 in Eve Hill, preserved locally at the Black Country Living Museum

Eve Hill is a residential area of Dudley in the West Midlands of England. It was part of Worcestershire until 1966 and briefly part of Staffordshire until 1974. The area was a key location during the Industrial Revolution.

== History ==
The development of Eve Hill as a residential area began in the mid-19th century, as the population of Dudley was soaring as a result of the Industrial Revolution. Hundreds of houses were built in the area around Salop Street which formed part of the main road leading to Sedgley and eventually Wolverhampton. St James's Parish Church was opened at this time to serve Eve Hill and the surrounding area. A new infants' school, St James's, was opened on the corner of Salop Street and Himley Road in 1842. An area in the west, along Himley Road, became known as London Fields.

Dudley Teacher Training College (later absorbed into the University of Wolverhampton) opened off Salop Street in 1905.

Further development took place in the 1930s, 1940s and 1950s, with a mix of private and council housing being built on the land stretching towards the Priory Estate that was developed before the Second World War.

The original part of Eve Hill, however, was still standing by the start of the 1960s, and by this stage most of the houses in the area were in an unfit condition with outdoor toilets, tin baths, and no electricity or running water. Dudley council decided to demolish the bulk of the older houses around Eve Hill in 1962, and by the end of the decade the landscape had altered drastically. The older houses had been levelled, with many families being rehoused on new council estates like Russells Hall, and the site had been redeveloped with three multi-storey blocks of council flats – Millfield Court, Prince of Wales Court, and Butterfield Court – being occupied by 1969. These tower blocks were 19, 19 and 16 storeys high respectively. A shopping parade with a butcher's shop and a post office was built in the shadow of Millfield Court.

However, the tower blocks soon fell into disrepair and were blighted by crime, and refurbishment and concierge programmes in the late 1980s and early 1990s did little to solve these problems. In March 1998, the council decided to demolish the two tallest tower blocks while retaining the third, and by the following April all of the 170 residents in the condemned tower blocks had been rehoused. The tower blocks were flattened in a controlled explosion on 18 July 1999, by which time the remaining block had been refurbished.

Meanwhile, the University of Wolverhampton sold the old Teacher Training College and the 1960s extensions on the completion of a new campus in Wolverhampton city centre in 2002. The modern buildings were taken over by Dudley College, while the Dudley Training College for Teachers was demolished and redeveloped as a private housing estate.

Shaver's End Water Works opened on Highland Road at Eve Hill in 1926.

Bishop Milner Catholic College opened on Burton Road in 1960 and remains in existence today, although most of it was rebuilt during the early-to-mid 2000s decade.

The Eve Hill area effectively expanded in 1966 when Sedgley Urban district was absorbed into Dudley, and the borders of Dudley as a town were extended approximately one mile north-west. This area included Burton Road Hospital, parts of which dated back to an 1859 workhouse and had only become a hospital in about 1900. The hospital remained open until December 1993, then the site was soon redeveloped for upmarket private housing. An ambulance station was opened next to the hospital a few years before its closure, while since its closure a new fire station (replacing the building on Tower Street in the town centre) opened in the old hospital grounds in 1998.
