= Andrew Burton (sculptor) =

English sculptor

Andrew Burton FRSS (born 1961) is an English sculptor and academic. He has created many public sculptures by commission, which stand in locations in Britain.

== Life ==
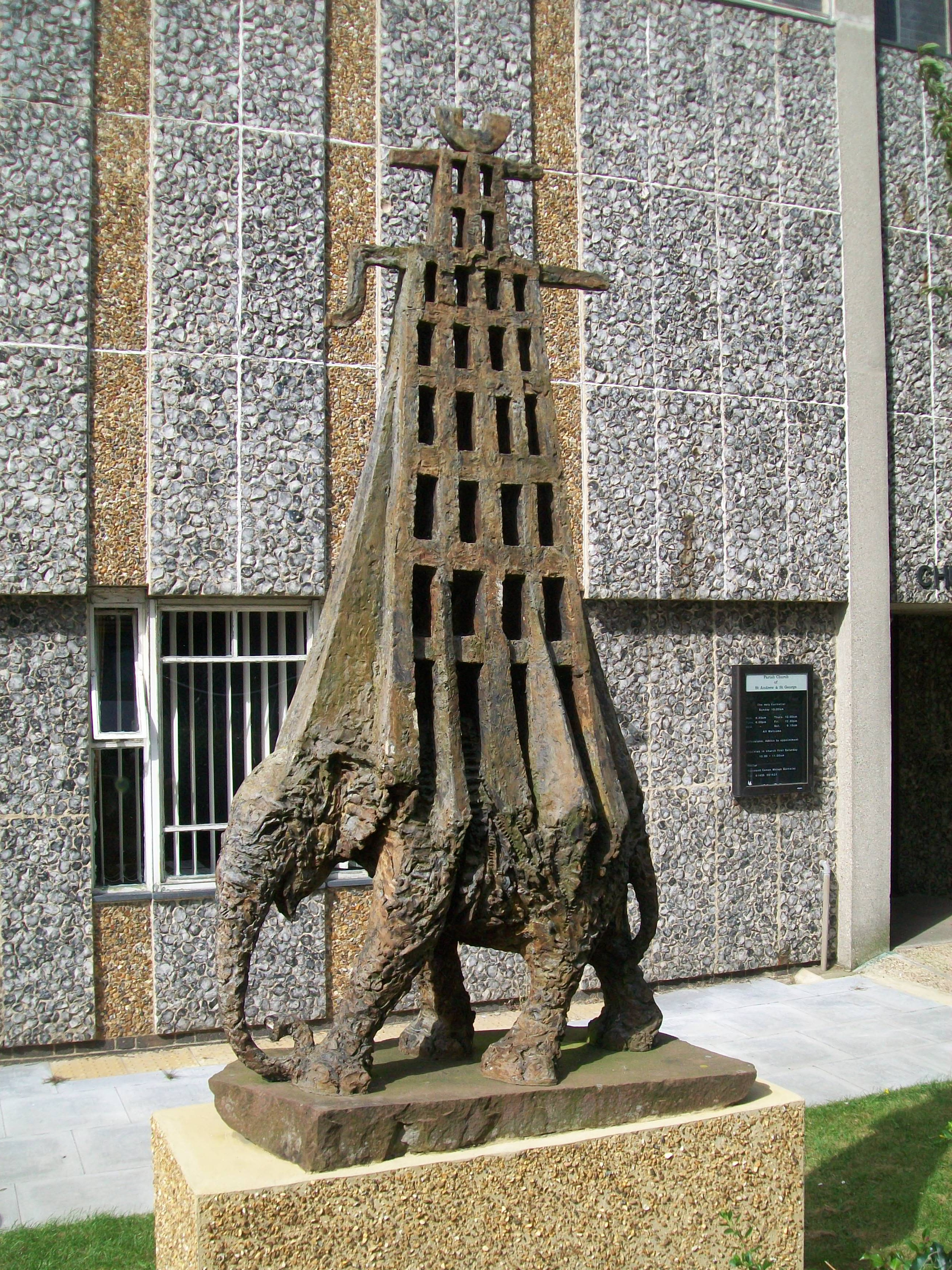
"Urban Elephant", in Stevenage, Hertfordshire

Burton was born in Kent, and studied at Newcastle University, gaining a first-class honours degree in 1983 and a master's degree in 1986. He afterwards visited India on a British Academy Travelling Scholarship. He has exhibited since 1990, at the Royal Academy and elsewhere. He is a professor of Fine Art at the School of Arts and Culture, within Newcastle University; he is a Fellow of the Royal Society of Sculptors, and a member of the International Academy of Ceramics.

== Works ==
Burton's works include the following:

Three bronze sculptures were commissioned for the Gateshead Garden Festival of 1990: "Lion", "Elephant under a Moroccan Edifice" and "Tipping off the World". They are now in Newcastle Business Park.

"Urban Elephant" of 1992, is a fibreglass sculpture in St George's Way, Stevenage, Hertfordshire, commissioned by the Stevenage Museum. The tower on the elephant represents Stevenage Clock Tower.

"Rudder", a bronze sculpture representing a ship's rudder, and "Column and Steps", an abstract steel sculpture, both of 1996, are in Keelman Square, Newcastle upon Tyne. They were commissioned by Tyne & Wear Development Corporation.

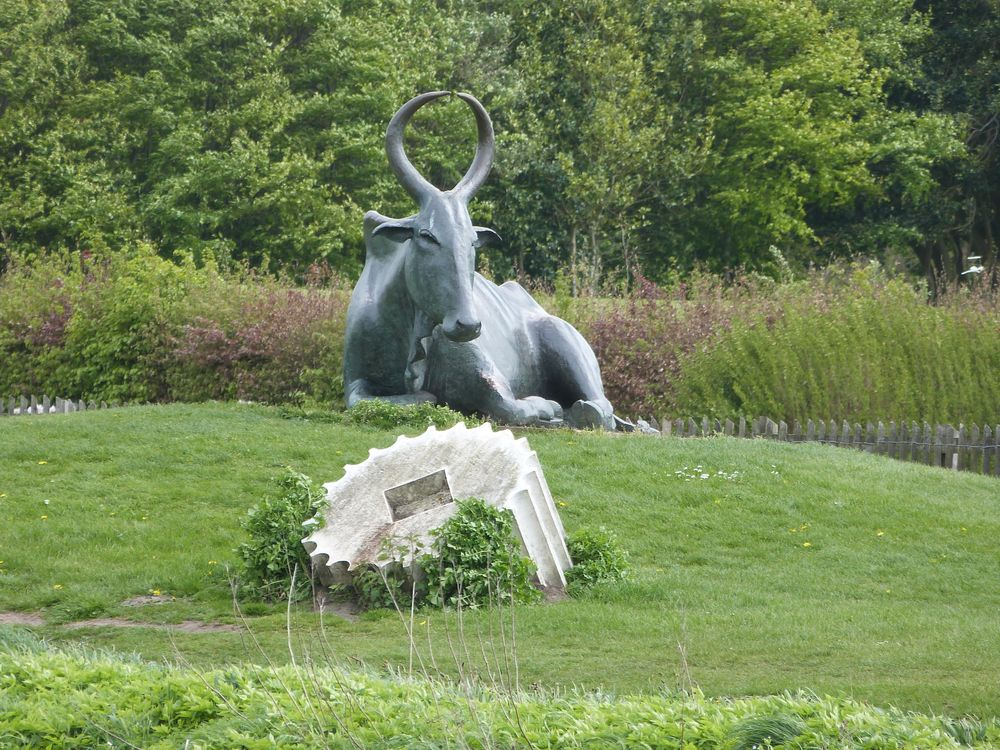
The Durham Cow

"The Durham Cow", commissioned by the City of Durham Council, was unveiled on 15 July 1997. It is a bronze statue of a cow, situated on the bank of the River Wear, and is part of the Durham City Heritage Sculpture Trail. It is inspired by a legend that monks bringing the remains of Saint Cuthbert from Lindisfarne to Durham, where the cathedral was subsequently erected, were guided there by a milkmaid who was bringing her cow to the same place.

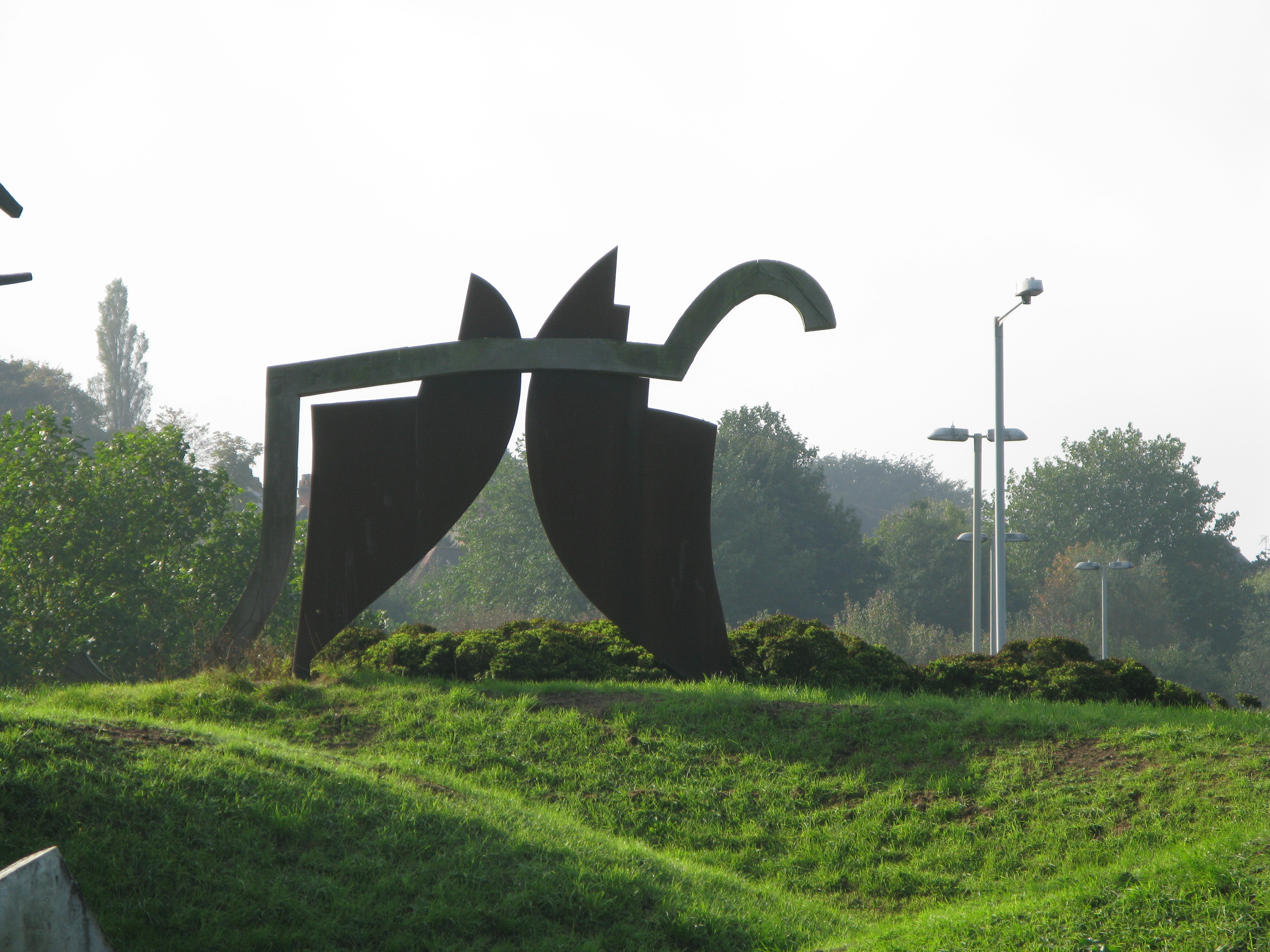
A plough, part of "Medieval Life", at Castlegate Roundabout, Dudley

"Medieval Life", is a set of five pieces at Castlegate Roundabout, Dudley, West Midlands, unveiled in July 2001. It was commissioned by Dudley Metropolitan Borough Council. There is a giant crucible with two pairs of tongs, a bell-shaped cannon with a pyramid of ten cannonballs, a two-dimensional lion passant, a ruined wall and a plough.

"The Orangery Urns", of 2018, was a temporary collection inspired by the Georgian urns in the orangery at Gibside, a historic estate near Newcastle upon Tyne. They were created for Mapping Contemporary Art in the Heritage Experience, a research project of Newcastle University. Burton said, about working in this way for a heritage site, that "... you're always having to come back to the story, back to the narrative.... Part of the point of the project is that the art does actually reveal something about the history of Gibside and something about the people...."
