= Church of St Edmund, Dudley =

Church of Saint Edmund
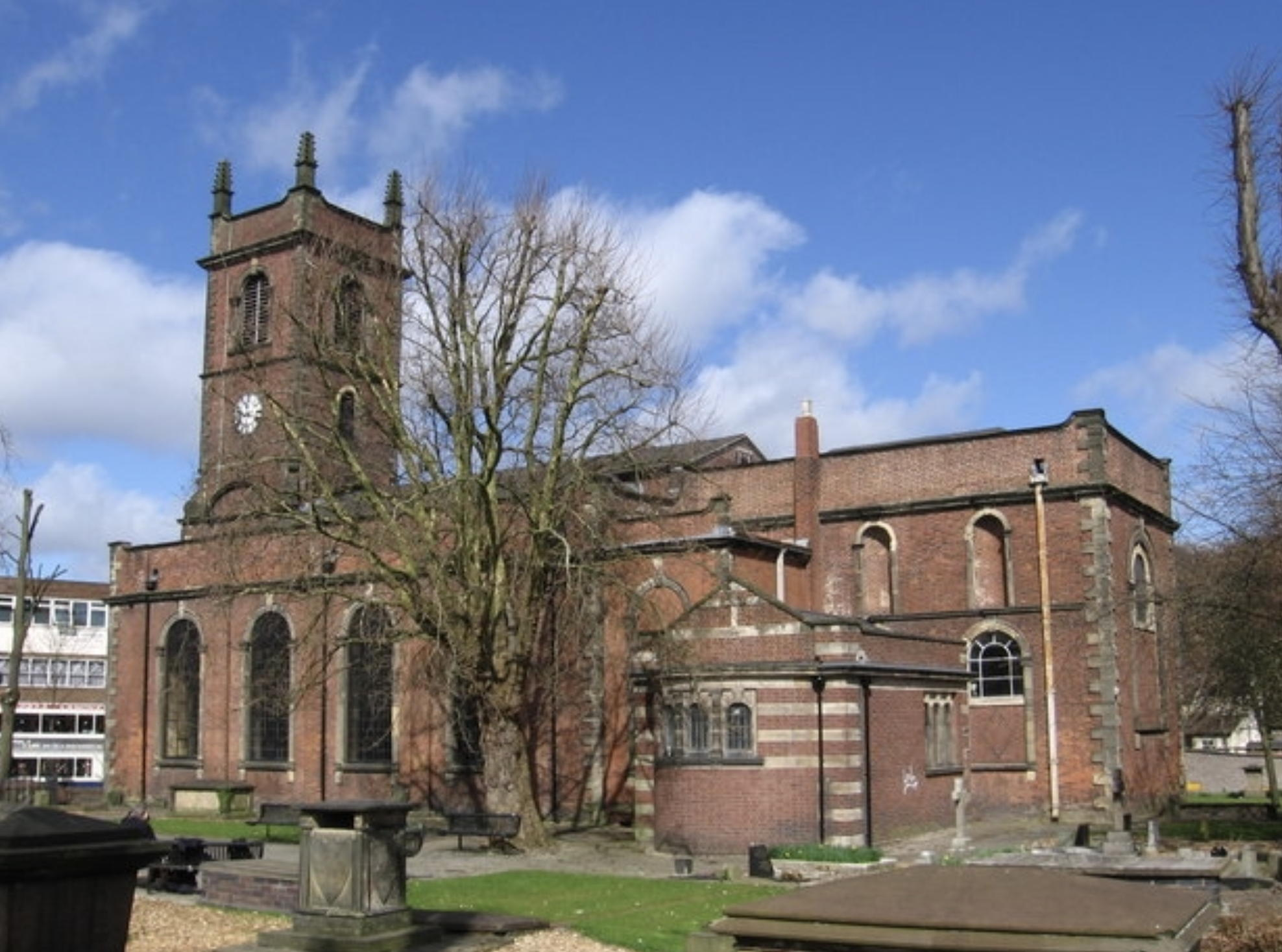
- St Edmund's Dudley, rebuilt 1724
- Interactive map of the Church of Saint Edmund area

General information
- Type: Church
- Architectural style: Palladian
- Location: Dudley, England
- Coordinates: 52.5119°N 2.0804°W
- Completed: c. 1724

Design and construction
- Awards and prizes: Grade II* listed building

The Church of Saint Edmund is a Grade II* listed Anglo-Catholic parish church on Castle Street in the town of Dudley in the West Midlands County of England. It is known locally as "Bottom Church", as opposed to St Thomas's parish church in High Street which is known as "Top Church".

The dedication is to the Anglo-Saxon King and Martyr, Edmund indicating the original church dated from the Anglo-Saxon period. Since Edmund died in 869 or 870 then the church must date from after this time, although there are no references to the church before the twelfth century. At the front of the present church are two sculptures showing a metal crown pierced by arrows – referring to the martyrdom of Edmund.

In 1190, it was noted as being within the possession of Dudley Priory. In 1646, during the English Civil War, Colonel Leveson ordered the demolition of the church. As a result, residents in the parish congregated at St. Thomas's Church in Dudley, which was repaired, and the parishes united.

St. Edmund's Church was subsequently rebuilt and was completed circa 1724. The reconstruction of the church was paid for by brothers Richard and George Bradley and by subscriptions from the parishioners. It was built of red brick with stone dressings and consisted of a chancel, nave, aisles, south porch and an embattled west tower.

The tradition of the church is Anglo-Catholic.

== Chapel of ease within the parish of St Thomas, 1646 to 1844 ==
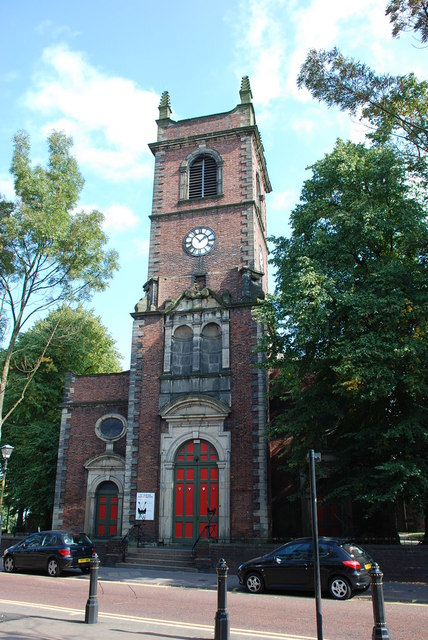
The tower of St Edmund's

Following the 1646 union of the parish with that of St. Thomas's and though the church was rebuilt in 1724 it was as a chapel of ease to St. Thomas's and it did not become the centre of a separate parish again until 1844.

The interior of the church was altered in 1864, although the church still retains its early pews, pulpit and panelled gallery.

On 14 September 1949 the building received Grade B listed status. This has since been upgraded to Grade II* listed status.

A school for children aged 5–11 years was built near to the church on Birmingham Street during the 19th century, but this closed in 1970 when it merged with St John's School on Kates Hill to form the Church of England Primary School of St Edmund and St John, located at a new site on Hillcrest Road. The school building survives, however, and since 1978 has been the Dudley Central Mosque.
