= Church of St Thomas, Dudley =

St. Thomas', Dudley
- Parish Church of Saint Thomas
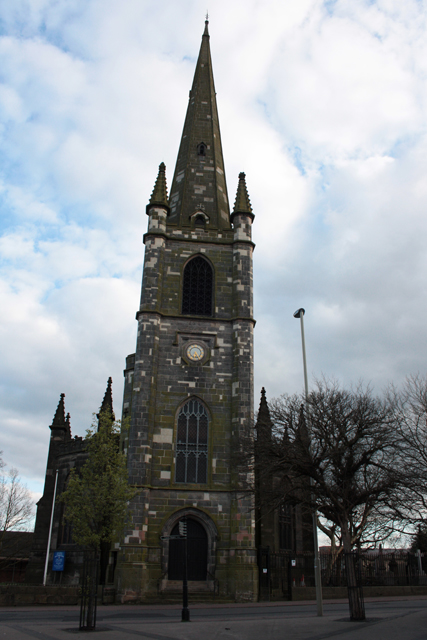
- St. Thomas' Church in Dudley, viewed from the North

- Location within the West Midlands
- 52.5085°N 2.0866°W
- OS grid reference: SO 94217 90082
- Location: Dudley, West Midlands
- Country: England
- Denomination: Anglican

History
- Status: Parish church
- Founded: c. 1182
- Dedication: St Thomas and St Luke
- Earlier dedication: Thomas Becket
- Events: Rebuilt in 1815

Architecture
- Functional status: Active
- Heritage designation: Grade II* Listed
- Designated: 14 September 1949
- Architect: William Brooks
- Style: Neo-Gothic
- Years built: 1815–1818
- Construction cost: £12,650

Specifications
- Materials: Bath Stone

Administration
- Province: Canterbury
- Diocese: Worcester
- Archdeaconry: Dudley
- Parish: Dudley; St. Thomas & St. Luke

Clergy
- Bishop(s): Martin Gorick, Bishop of Dudley

The Church of Saint Thomas is a Grade II* listed Church of England Anglican parish church in Dudley in the West Midlands County of England. Known locally as 'Top Church', as opposed to the 'Bottom Church' of St. Edmund's, it was originally established in the 12th century, when it was dedicated to Thomas Becket who had been murdered a few years before.

The church is mentioned in a Papal Declaration of 1182, which granted it to the nearby Priory of St. James. At some point in its history, the church's dedication changed to the Apostle St Thomas. The current building dates from the 19th century. It was rebuilt in 1815 under an act of parliament after the existing building was declared unsafe, for a cost of £12,650.

On 7 September 1940, the Luftwaffe dropped a bomb opposite the front of the church, blowing out most of the windows and leaving shrapnel damage which is still evident.

The church is in the Anglican Diocese of Worcester, despite the town of Dudley being transferred into the county of Staffordshire in 1966, and later the West Midlands county upon its creation in 1974. The church's original parish, Dudley St. Thomas, was abolished in 1969 to form the current Dudley St. Thomas & St. Luke Ecclesiastical Parish.

The church building was granted Grade II* listed status in 1949.
