= List of schools in Dudley =

This is a list of schools in the Metropolitan Borough of Dudley, West Midlands, England.

== State-funded schools ==
=== Primary schools ===
- Alder Coppice Primary School, Sedgley
- Amblecote Primary School, Amblecote
- Ashwood Park Primary School, Wordsley
- Beechwood CE Primary School, Dudley
- Belle Vue Primary School, Wordsley
- Blanford Mere Primary School, Kingswinford
- Blowers Green Primary School, Dudley
- Bramford Primary School, Coseley
- Brierley Hill Primary School, Brierley Hill
- Brockmoor Primary School, Brockmoor
- Bromley Hills Primary School, Kingswinford
- The Bromley-Pensnett Primary School, Pensnett
- Brook Primary School, Wordsley
- Caslon Primary Community School, Halesowen
- Christ Church CE Primary School, Coseley
- Church of the Ascension CE Primary School, Wall Heath
- Colley Lane Primary Academy, Halesowen
- Cotwall End Primary School, Sedgley
- Cradley CE Primary School, Cradley
- Crestwood Park Primary School, Kingswinford
- Dawley Brook Primary School, Kingswinford
- Dingle Community Primary School, Kingswinford
- Dudley Wood Primary School, Dudley
- Fairhaven Primary School, Wordsley
- Foxyards Primary School, Coseley
- Gig Mill Primary School, Norton
- Glynne Primary School, Kingswinford
- Greenfield Primary School, Stourbridge
- Halesowen CE Primary School, Halesowen
- Ham Dingle Primary Academy, Pedmore
- Hawbush Primary School, Brierley Hill
- Hob Green Primary School, Stourbridge
- Howley Grange Primary School, Halesowen
- Huntingtree Primary School, Halesowen
- Hurst Green Primary School, Halesowen
- Hurst Hill Primary School, Hurst Hill
- Jesson's CE Primary School, Dudley
- Kates Hill Primary School, Dudley
- Lapal Primary School, Halesowen
- Lutley Primary School, Halesowen
- Maidensbridge Primary School, Wall Heath
- Manor Way Primary Academy, Halesowen
- Milking Bank Primary School, Milking Bank
- Mount Pleasant Primary School, Quarry Bank
- Netherbrook Primary School, Netherton
- Netherton CE Primary School, Netherton
- Newfield Park Primary School, Halesowen
- Northfield Road Primary School, Netherton
- Oldswinford CE Primary School, Stourbridge
- Olive Hill Primary Academy, Halesowen
- Our Lady and St Kenelm RC School, Halesowen
- Pedmore CE Primary School, Pedmore
- Peters Hill Primary School, Amblecote
- Priory Primary School, Dudley
- Quarry Bank Primary School, Quarry Bank
- Queen Victoria Primary School, Sedgley
- Red Hall Primary School, Lower Gornal
- The Ridge Primary School, Wollaston
- Roberts Primary School, Lower Gornal
- Rufford Primary School, Stourbridge
- Russells Hall Primary School, Dudley
- St Chad's RC Primary School, Sedgley
- St James's CE Primary School, Wollaston
- St Joseph's RC Primary School, Dudley
- St Joseph's RC Primary School, Stourbridge
- St Margaret's at Hasbury CE Primary School, Hasbury
- St Mark's CE Primary School, Pensnett
- St Mary's CE Primary School, Kingswinford
- St Mary's RC Primary School, Brierley Hill
- Sledmere Primary School, Dudley
- Straits Primary School, Lower Gornal
- Tenterfields Primary Academy, Halesowen
- Thorns Primary School, Quarry Bank
- Wallbrook Primary Academy, Coseley
- Withymoor Primary School, Brierley Hill
- Wollescote Primary School, Wollescote
- Woodside Primary School, Woodside
- Wrens Nest Primary School, Dudley

=== Secondary schools ===
- Beacon Hill Academy, Sedgley
- Bishop Milner Catholic College, Dudley
- The Crestwood School, Kingswinford
- Dormston School, Sedgley
- The Earls High School, Halesowen
- Ellowes Hall Sports College, Lower Gornal
- Kingswinford Academy, Kingswinford
- Leasowes High School, Halesowen
- The Link Academy, Netherton
- Old Swinford Hospital, Stourbridge
- Pedmore High School, Pedmore
- Pegasus Academy, Dudley
- Redhill School, Stourbridge
- Ridgewood High School, Wollaston
- St James Academy, Dudley
- Summerhill School, Kingswinford
- Thorns Collegiate Academy, Quarry Bank
- Windsor High School, Halesowen
- The Wordsley School, Wordsley

=== Special and alternative schools ===
- The Brier School, Kingswinford
- Cherry Tree Learning Centre, Dudley
- Halesbury School, Halesowen
- The Old Park School, Brierley Hill
- Pens Meadow School, Wordsley
- Rosewood School, Coseley
- Sutton School, Dudley
- Sycamore Short Stay School, Dudley
- Woodsetton School, Woodsetton

=== Further education ===
- Birmingham Metropolitan College (Stourbridge Campus)
- Dudley College of Technology
- Halesowen College
- King Edward VI College

== Independent schools ==
=== Primary and preparatory schools ===
- The King Alfred School, Lower Gornal

=== Senior and all-through schools ===
- Elmfield Rudolf Steiner School, Stourbridge

=== Special and alternative schools ===
- Coombswood Special School, Halesowen
- Impact Independent School, Haden Hill
- Priory Park Community School, Dudley
- The Rowan School, Coseley
- The Wenlock School, Dudley

== See also ==
- Defunct schools in the Metropolitan Borough of Dudley
