= Rosland Secondary School =

Defunct school in Dudley, England

Coordinates: 52.5116°N 2.0702°W

Information
- Established: 1932
- Closed: 1990

Rosland Secondary School was a secondary school located in Dudley, England. It was built in 1932 to serve the expanding Kates Hill area of the town, and closed in 1970. Its buildings became part of The Blue Coat School, previously based several hundred yards away in Bean Road, until the entire school moved to the Rosland site in 1981.

It remained in use as a school until July 1990, a year after the Blue Coat School had merged with The Dudley School to form Castle High, with the old Rosland building being used as an annexe to Castle High for the oldest two year groups of former Blue Coat pupils.

It is now a community centre owned by St Thomas's Community Network.
