= Park Secondary School =

Secondary school in Dudley, England

Coordinates: 52.5111°N 2.0949°W

Park Secondary School was a secondary school located in Dudley, West Midlands (formerly Worcestershire and later Staffordshire), England.

It was opened in 1896 as Park (Demonstration) School to serve the expanding area to the west of Dudley town centre on Wolverhampton Street and Wellington Road.

The school's popularity dipped during the 1960s following the completion of the new Holly Hall School and by the early 1970s closure was looking likely as a result of the falling numbers on the school roll. The last major change to the school took place in September 1972 when it became a 12-16 school, following the local authority's decision to increase the secondary transfer age from 11.

The school finally closed its doors in July 1975 when it merged with the town's Grammar and High Schools to form The Dudley School, which in turn became Castle High in September 1989 on its merger with The Blue Coat School.

However, the Park School buildings remained in use for two years as an annexe of the Dudley School, being demolished soon after falling into disuse in the summer of 1977 to make way for the new building of Jesson's Middle School which opened in 1980.
