= St Thomas's Community Network =

Coordinates: 52.5117°N 2.0703°W

St Thomas's Community Network is a community facility which served the St Thomas's parish of Dudley, West Midlands, England.

The opportunity for a large community centre in the Kates Hill area was on the horizon in October 1988, when Dudley council confirmed that the Blue Coat School on Beechwood Road (a building which had started life in 1929 as Rosland Secondary School) would be merging with The Dudley School in the town centre with effect from September 1989 to form Castle High School, and that the Beechwood Road buildings would close in July 1990 after a year as the Castle High annexe.

The dream of a community centre for one of the most deprived areas of Dudley became reality in 1991, when St Thomas's Community Network opened at Beechwood Road.

It offers youth club facilities to children and teenagers, as well as educational support to young people who require assistance with literacy, numeracy or English as a second language. A qualified tutor is employed for these sessions. This education support was a particularly important asset in the St Thomas's area, as it has a larger percentage of Asian residents.

Despite campaigns by local residents, the centre closed in September 2015 and was demolished just over a year later.
