= Leasowes High School =

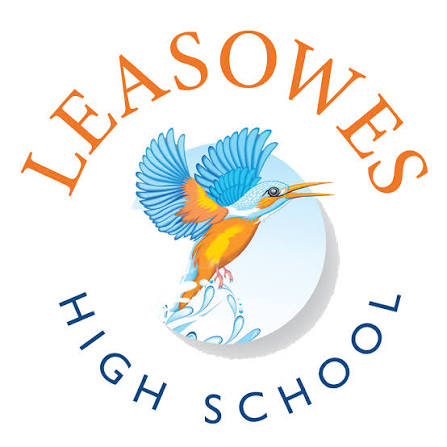

Location
- Kent Road; Halesowen, West Midlands, B62 8PJ; England; 52.4597°N 2.0276°W

Information
- Type: Academy
- Motto: Aspire and Achieve
- Established: c. 1972
- Local authority: Dudley
- Trust: Invictus Education Trust
- Department for Education URN: 103861 Tables
- Ofsted: Reports
- Headteacher: Chris Papadopoullos
- Gender: Coeducational
- Age: 11 to 16
- Enrolment: 755 pupils
- Houses: C1 and C2, K1 and K2, N1 and N2, S1 and S2
- Colours: Blue & Orange Ties: Year 7 = Orange & Blue, Year 8 = Blue, Year 9 = Purple, Year 10 = Orange Year 11 = Grey
- Website: https://www.leasoweshighschool.co.uk/

Leasowes High School is a coeducational secondary school located in Halesowen in the West Midlands of England.

It regularly performs well in the Dudley Borough's GCSE league tables; and there is a high application rate amongst primary school leavers, meaning that some local children have to attend schools further afield, such as Earls High School and Windsor High School.

== History ==
The school was opened in September 1972 as a 13-18 mixed secondary school, as Halesowen borough council had abandoned the traditional 5-7 infant, 7-11 junior and 11-16/18 secondary schools in favour of a three-tier system of 5-9 first, 9-13 middle and 13-18 secondary schools. Leasowes High School effectively replaced Hill & Cakemore Secondary Modern Schools on Long Lane, with the old school becoming Greenhill Middle School.

Halesowen was absorbed by Dudley (which had adopted 5-8 first and 8-12 middle schools in 1972) in April 1974, but the system in Halesowen continued until September 1982, when the traditional age ranges were reinstated, although the remaining parts of Dudley did not revert to this system for another eight years. Leasowes became an 11-16 comprehensive as a result of this reorganisation, resulting in the closure of Greenhill Middle School. The three oldest year groups at Greenhill moved up to Leasowes, while the youngest year group were transferred to Olive Hill Primary School. Sixth form education in Halesowen was then centralised to an expanded Halesowen College.

The Greenhill Middle School site remained in use until 1987, as an annexe to Leasowes until new buildings on the Kent Road site were opened to accommodate the sufficient pupil numbers. It was demolished soon after.

In September 2004 Leasowes Community College was awarded specialist school status, giving them the title of Business and Enterprise College. This has allowed the college to expand by the addition of a new £2.5 million building to provide modern and well equipped ICT learning and teaching equipment to accommodate its status.

Halesowen Education Trust is the first of its kind in the UK. Launched in late 2007, the area's secondary schools, Earls High School, Windsor High School and Leasowes Community College, have formed a Trust federation with Halesowen College, with the support of the Wolverhampton University, Dudley Local Authority and business partners.

In 2008 Leasowes Community College was awarded "Outstanding Winner 2008" at the 21st Century Learning Alliance Awards.

The school suffered a tragedy on 7 March 2013 when 16-year-old pupil Christina Edkins was stabbed to death on a bus travelling along nearby Hagley Road on her journey to school. The tragedy has been the focus of local and national media attention.

Previously a foundation school administered by Dudley Metropolitan Borough Council, in December 2016 Leasowes High School converted to academy status. The school is now sponsored by the Invictus Education Trust.

== Trilby Multimedia ==
Leasowes has a close working relationship with Trilby Multimedia. In October 2004 Leasowes worked closely with Trilby to create the Mediaonics Fantasia. For two weeks the Ruskin Centre, Stourbridge, hosted staff and pupils from Halesowen Education Trust and Industry Partners to create the Garden Of Imaginary Delights, a Mediaonics Fantasia installation on a large scale with influences from Hawkstone Park and Follies.
