= Birmingham Metropolitan College =

College in Birmingham, England

Location
- Jennens Road; Birmingham, West Midlands, B4 7PS; 52°34′3″N 1°49′18″W

Information
- Type: FE College
- Motto: Shaping futures, realising dreams
- Local authority: Birmingham
- Department for Education URN: 130466 Tables
- Ofsted: Reports
- Gender: mixed
- Age: 16+
- Enrolment: 20,000
- Website: http://www.bmet.ac.uk/

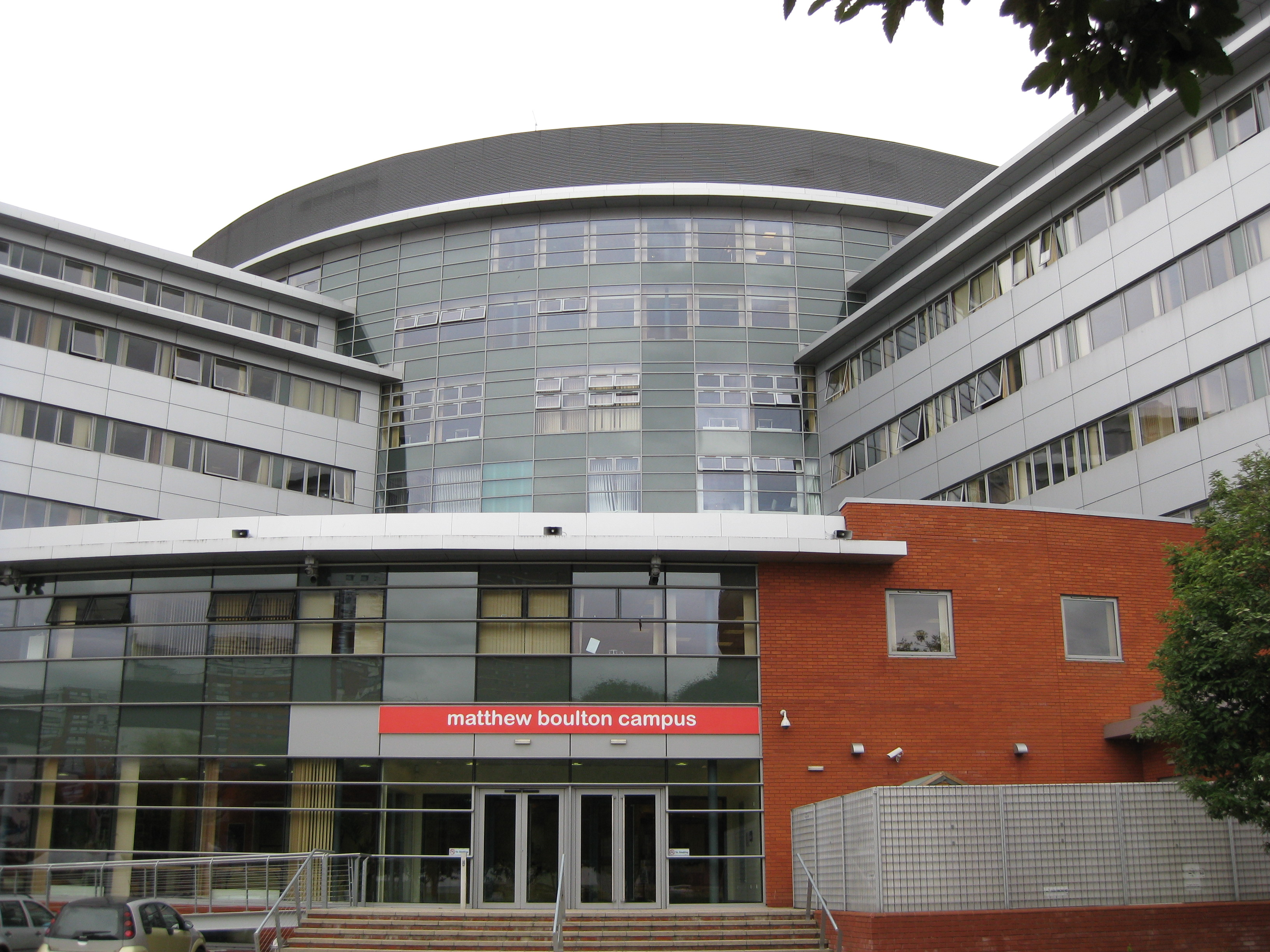
The Matthew Boulton Campus viewed from Aston University Lake.

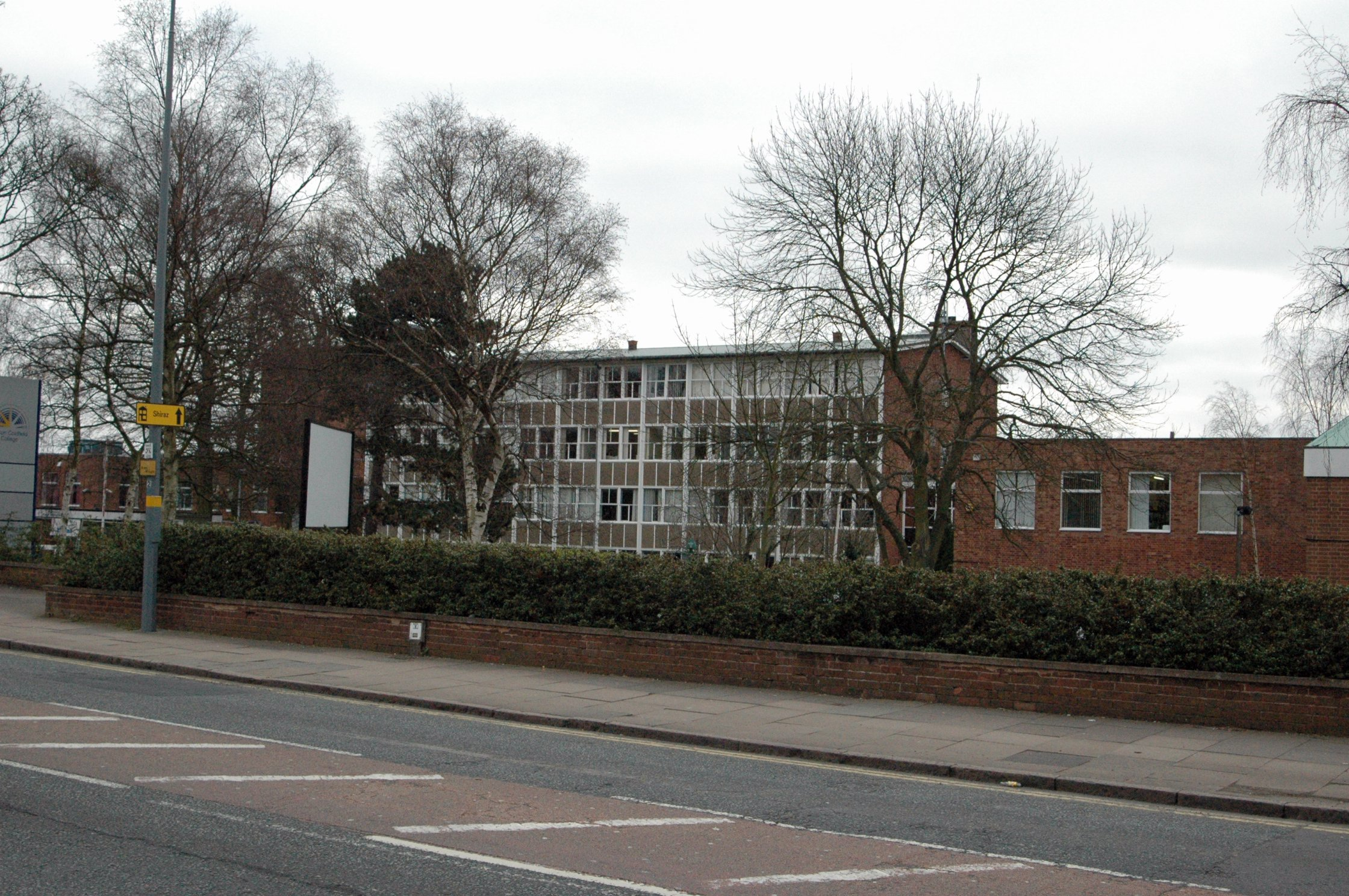
The Sutton Coldfield Campus viewed from Lichfield Road prior to the 2008 refurbishment.

Birmingham Metropolitan College is a further and higher education college with 10 campuses distributed within Birmingham, England. The college was created in 2009 as an amalgamation of Matthew Boulton College and Sutton Coldfield College. The main site is Matthew Boulton College based at Jennens Road in Birmingham City Centre.

In addition to the existing campuses and facilities, there are proposals for the construction of a new campus in Perry Barr, although these plans are currently on hold due to funding issues. The college is a member of the Collab Group of high performing schools.

== History ==
=== Matthew Boulton College ===
The origins of Matthew Boulton College are related to the Municipal Technical School, which was located on Suffolk Street in Birmingham. Construction commenced on the college on 18 November 1893 and it was opened on 16 September 1895. The purpose-built premises were used by 34 staff and approximately 2,000 students. The classes available were Chemistry, Physics, Mechanical & Electrical Engineering, Metallurgy, Mathematics, Handicrafts and Typography and Drawing.

By the mid-1930s, a new site had been acquired in Gosta Green and another college called the College of Technology, Commerce and Art was constructed, although construction was delayed by World War II. The Gosta Green site became the UK's first College of Advanced Technology (CAT), later Aston University, receiving its royal charter in 1966. In 1957, it was decided to rename the separate Suffolk Street building and in November 1957, it became the Matthew Boulton Technical College, named after Matthew Boulton, a prominent local industrialist of the Industrial Revolution.

During the 1950s and 1960s, a new college was constructed on Sherlock Street and the courses were moved there in a phased approach throughout the 1960s. By the late 1990s, these premises had become unfit for purpose and it was deemed uneconomic to refurbish them, so Matthew Boulton College sought a new location on Jennens Road in the Eastside area of the city in late 1999 close to the Aston University Campus. The 18,000-square-metre (193,750 sq ft) site was purchased by the college from Aston University in 2003 and a three-month demolition programme on the site commenced in September 2003. Construction started in January 2004 and was completed by July 2005 to allow the building to be opened to students for the new academic year in September 2005. The project cost £37.9 million, £13.2 million was given by the Birmingham and Solihull Learning and Skills Council, the largest awarded in the Midlands and the second largest in the country to a college of further and higher education. Construction cost approximately £23 million. Bond Bryan Architects were commissioned to design the scheme while Davis Langdon were appointed to manage the construction and costs of the project.

The Sherlock Street buildings were purchased by the regional development agency Advantage West Midlands and were demolished in late 2008.

=== Sutton Coldfield College ===
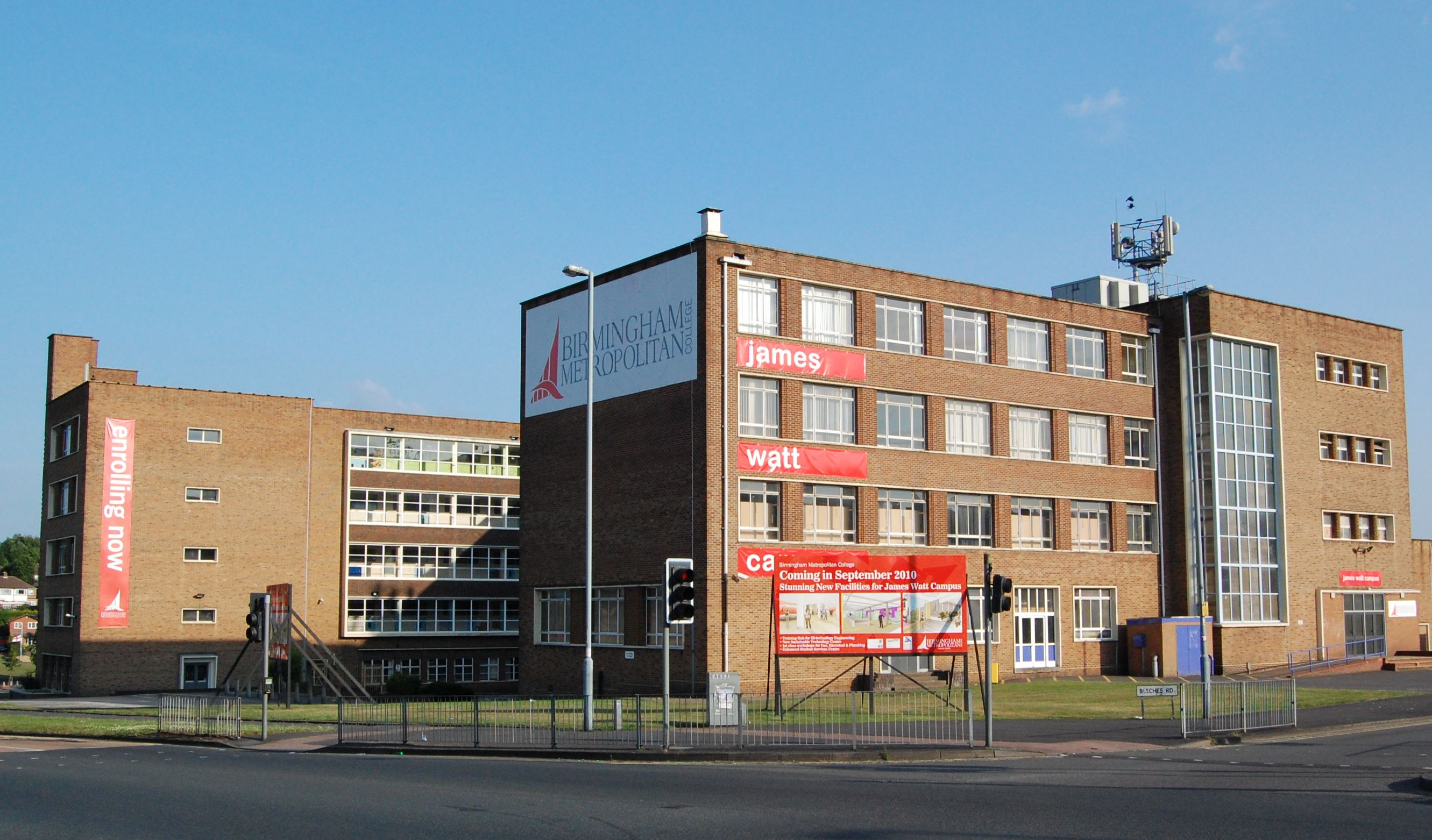
James Watt Campus in June 2010

Sutton Coldfield College originated in 1896 as a technical school, then expanded in 1964 as a further education college. Preparations for the further education college began in the 1950s when its purpose-built facilities at Lichfield Road were constructed. In 2003, plans were submitted to the Government for North Birmingham College, formerly Brooklyn Technical College, to be merged with Sutton Coldfield College. The plans were laid before Parliament on 19 May 2003 and subsequently approved by Margaret Hodge. North Birmingham College was then dissolved with all of its property being transferred to Sutton Coldfield College on 1 August 2003, with the college buildings becoming the Great Barr campus (It is now known as BMC's 'James Watt Campus'). In 2006, plans were put before Parliament for the merger of Josiah Mason Sixth Form College and Sutton Coldfield College. They were approved by the Secretary of State and Josiah Mason College was dissolved on 1 August 2006, with its properties being transferred to Sutton Coldfield College.

A new Sixth Form Centre, designed by SMC Hickton Madeley Architects, at the Lichfield Road campus was completed in 2001. Also recently completed is an Amenities Building and a new entrance to the Design Centre. The 1950s buildings at the Lichfield Road campus underwent an extensive refurbishment in 2008 which also saw the partial demolition of the Student Services building which was then reconstructed to become the Business Development Centre.

=== Merger ===
In 2008, Matthew Boulton College and Sutton Coldfield College collaborated in providing courses. In the same year, they applied to the Government to allow the two colleges to merge, and also applied for funding from the Learning and Skills Council for the construction of a new £42 million campus on a former dairy site alongside the River Tame, in Perry Barr, named the Riverside. To allow the merger of the two colleges, Matthew Boulton College was dissolved and all of its properties transferred to Sutton Coldfield College. The merger to create 'Birmingham Metropolitan College' was approved by the Secretary of State in June 2009 and came into effect from 1 August 2009. Upon the merger, the new college had a combined student population of 27,000, making it one of the largest further and higher education institutions in the United Kingdom.

Before the 2013–2014 academic year, the college prohibited garments obscuring the face, for which it was congratulated by the Prime Minister, David Cameron.

== Campuses ==
Birmingham Metropolitan College manages eight campuses within Birmingham, most of them the result of previous college mergers. The main site is Matthew Boulton College in Birmingham City Centre. Sutton Coldfield College at Lichfield Road in Sutton Coldfield is home to the college's administrative offices, a sixth form college and further education facilities. The buildings were mostly constructed in the 1950s as purpose-built structure although the college also obtained the Grade II* listed Moat House which was built in the 17th century by Sir William Wilson. They also obtained the Old Art School, further up Lichfield Road adjacent to Bishop Vesey's Grammar School, which is now being used as a performing arts centre. On Sutton Coldfield High Street is the college's Media Centre which is based within the Emmanuel Court office complex. The college has a separate campus in The Mall Sutton Coldfield, also known as the Gracechurch Shopping Centre, in Sutton Coldfield town centre that serves as the college's IT campus. Another campus in Sutton Coldfield is the Design Centre, a specially converted building on the periphery of Sutton Coldfield town centre.

There are two campuses in the Erdington area of north Birmingham; Slade Road and Mason Road. The Slade Road campus was originally occupied by Josiah Mason College until it merged with Sutton Coldfield College. Josiah Mason College also occupied another campus in Castle Vale that is now occupied by Birmingham Metropolitan College. The Castle Vale campus was completed as part of the C3 complex on the High Street in December 2005 at a cost of £3.7 million and shares the building with Castle Vale Library. The building was designed by Associated Architects and was officially opened on 6 March 2006. The building received funding from the council, European Regional Development Fund and the Learning and Skills Council. There are 27 public computer terminals and an additional 60 study places in the 600 m^{2} (6,458 sq ft) building. The distinctive building features a curved double-height corner feature, topped by a sharp Tecu Bronze-clad apex. The other campus, James Watt Campus, located in north Birmingham is the Great Barr facility that was formerly North Birmingham College, and before that Brooklyn Technical College.

Matthew Boulton campus, formerly the main Matthew Boulton College building, serves as the second largest campus for Birmingham Metropolitan College. The nine-storey building is located on Jennens Road in the Eastside district of Birmingham City Centre, adjacent to Aston University.

=== Riverside campus ===
Plans for a new campus for Sutton Coldfield College in the Perry Barr area of Birmingham came to light in 2005. The site chosen was the former Express and Avonmore Dairy complex on Aldridge Road and the initial plans included the construction of a four-storey building, which received approval from Birmingham City Council in November 2005. The services offered at the Great Barr and Mason Road campuses were to be consolidated into the single campus at Aldridge Road. The sale of the campuses would fund the construction and plans were put forward for the construction of 89 houses and 31 flats of two and three storeys on the Great Barr campus site.

The merger of Josiah Mason College and Sutton Coldfield College led to the plans being put on hold in 2006. Work towards the start of construction of the campus were due to commence in 2007 following the appointment of Christine Braddock as college principal from Matthew Boulton College. However, the college decided to change the plans following the merger so that the services at the Josiah Mason campus and Castle Vale campus could be incorporated onto the site. Tendering for a contractor commenced in March 2008. The new designs by Nicholas Hare Architects LLP for the campus were unveiled in mid-2008 and the project progressed with appointment of various companies to help manage the project. In August 2008, Concept were appointed as project managers while BAM Construction were appointed to construct the scheme and BAM Design were appointed as structural engineers. and the planning application was submitted on 16 October 2008. The planning application was approved by the city council on 18 December 2008. The approved designs included a six-storey building with 22,000 m^{2} (236,806 sq ft) of space on the 7.5-acre (30,351 m^{2}) site. The scheme is estimated to cost £44 million. It was believed that construction would commence in April 2009 with completion due for the start of the new academic year in September 2010.

Construction of the campus was reliant on the college being able to obtain a £21 million grant from the Learning and Skills Council. However, in early 2009, the Learning and Skills Council announced that they were putting a freeze on capital programmes due to a lack of funds. LSC then announced that they would launch a cost-cutting programme. There were worries that the Riverside scheme could be classed as a "rebuild" by LSC, who had announced that a small number of "rebuild" projects would receive full funding. In July 2009, Sutton Coldfield College learned that it was not one of the thirteen shortlisted colleges to receive funding, placing the Riverside project in jeopardy as the college would only be able to apply for funding next in 2011.

=== Stourbridge campus ===
Stourbridge College was formed in 1958 as the Foley College of Further Education and College of Art, through the merger of the Stourbridge College of Art (founded in 1848) and the Stourbridge Technical School (founded in 1891). It was renamed Stourbridge College of Technology and Art in 1979. The college became a further education corporation in 1992, after the Further and Higher Education Act 1992. The college merged with BMET in 2013.

The main campus, built during the 1970s, is situated south of Stourbridge Town Centre. A second campus opened in 1990 within the buildings of the former Longlands School, after the school had closed to merge with High Park School to form the Ridgewood High School.

A third campus opened in 2001 at the Merry Hill Waterfront, some four miles away in Brierley Hill. An additional Brierley Hill campus opened in September 2011, housing a new Art and Design centre, with a new technology centre currently being planned for the same site.

Stourbridge College was closed down in 2019, leading to a call for enquiry from Stourbridge's MP, Margot James, alongside students being transferred to nearby Dudley College and Halesowen College, although many students chose not to - many citing issues with travel time and cost.

== Alumni ==
- Scott Adkins†
- David Benson†
- Ashley Blake†
- Frederick Carder ‡
- Gideon London ‡
- Nigel Mansell*
- David Reekie ‡
- Mike Skinner†
- Samantha Tross*
- Ian Walters ‡
- Neville Weston ‡

* - Matthew Boulton College

† - Sutton Coldfield College

‡ - Stourbridge College

== See also ==
- Education in Birmingham
