= A Bolt from the Blue =

A Bolt from the Blue may refer to:

- A Bolt from the Blue (play), a British comedy book and play by David Tristram
- A Bolt from the Blue (film), a 2014 Japanese comedy-drama film
- A Bolt from the Blue and Other Essays, a 2002 book by Mary McCarthy
- A Bolt from the Blue, an episode of Lois & Clark: The New Adventures of Superman
- A Bolt from the Blue, an episode of The Worst Witch
