= Norman Whiting =

English cricketer

Personal information
- Born: 2 October 1920; Wollaston, Warwickshire
- Died: 23 February 2014 (aged 93)
- Batting: Right-handed
- Bowling: Right-arm off-break

Career statistics
Competition	First-class
Matches	59
Runs scored	1,583
Batting average	18.62
100s/50s	2/5
Top score	118
Balls bowled	1,134
Wickets	13
Bowling average	50.53
5 wickets in innings	0
10 wickets in match	0
Best bowling	2/27
Catches/stumpings	32/–
- Source: Cricinfo, 8 November 2022

Norman Harry Whiting (2 October 1920 – 23 February 2014) was an English first-class cricketer who played 59 matches for Worcestershire in the late 1940s and early 1950s. He was born in Wollaston, which at that time lay within Worcestershire. Primarily a batsman, he also bowled a little in later seasons and occasionally stood in as wicket-keeper.

== Career ==
Whiting made his first-class debut in August 1947 against Northamptonshire, opening the batting with Don Kenyon and scoring 7 and 23. He appeared three more times that season, and six times in 1948, but after a match in May 1949 he had played 18 first-class innings with a top score of a mere 36. Demoted to the Second XI and playing in the Minor Counties Championship, he immediately started to score more heavily and consistently, with eleven successive innings at that level producing scores of between 27 and 87, and at the end of August he was recalled to the first team against the Combined Services, making 56 — his maiden first-class half-century — and 1.

In late May 1950 Whiting scored the first of his two hundreds when he hit 118 against Essex at Romford, sharing a fourth-wicket partnership of 198 with Laddie Outschoorn. Although Whiting played 20 matches in all that year, he made only one further half-century — 58 against Nottinghamshire in late June — and finished the season with a batting average of a bare 20.

1951 saw Whiting experience a good start to his summer, with 68* against Sussex and 51* against Essex in his first two matches, but these were to prove his only substantial scores of a season in which he was dismissed for scores of 5 or below in 13 of his 22 innings, and in which his average fell markedly even from the previous year to 14.66. Some slight redemption was gained from his first first-class wickets: he took nine, the first being that of Essex's Frank Vigar.

In 1952 Whiting suffered another poor year, and although he averaged slightly above 26, this was not a true reflection of his County Championship form as almost all his significant scores came in university games. He made 111 and 83 in May against Oxford University, and 39 and 31 against Cambridge University; in the latter game he also took his last wicket, that of Mike Stevenson. These matches apart, 32 against Warwickshire was his highest score of the summer.

Although Whiting never played first-class cricket again, he did return in his fifties to captain his county in the Second Eleven Championship between 1974 and 1976. He was not at all successful with the bat, however, only twice reaching 20 in more than forty innings for the side. He died at the age of 93 in 2014.
