= Daniel Batham and Son =

Brewery in Brierley Hill, West Midlands, England

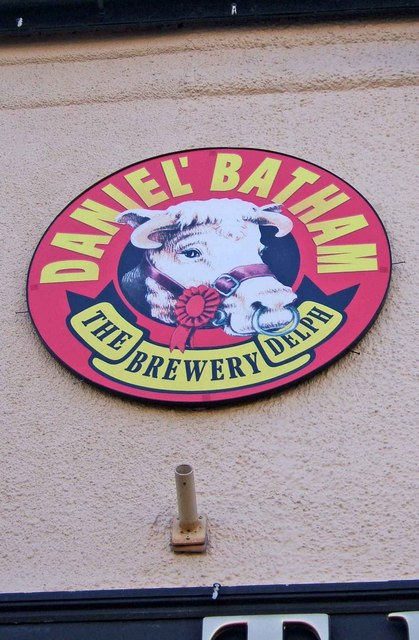
- Interactive map of Daniel Batham and Son
- Location: Brierley Hill, West Midlands, England
- Coordinates: 52.4758°N 2.1265°W
- Opened: 1877; 149 years ago
- Website: www.bathams.co.uk

Active beers
Name	Type
Bathams Best Bitter	Best bitter
Bathams Mild Ale	Mild

Seasonal beers
Name	Type
Bathams XXX	Strong ale

Bathams is a brewery in Brierley Hill, West Midlands, England established in 1877 in a former slaughterhouse. The brewery is described by the CAMRA Good Beer Guide as "A classic Black country small brewery". It produces three cask conditioned beers, Best Bitter (4.3%), Mild (3.5%) and XXX (6.3%), a Christmas special. The Best Bitter won its highly contested class at the Great British Beer Festival in 1991. Bottled versions are also available at Bathams pubs.

The Brewery is currently run by brothers Tim and Matt Batham, having been in the Batham family for five generations. It is one of few breweries that still use 54-gallon hogshead casks.

Bathams owns twelve pubs in the Black Country and West Midlands:

- The Britannia Inn, Upper Gornal, Dudley
- The Bird in Hand, Oldswinford, Stourbridge
- The Fox and Grapes, Pensnett, Brierley Hill
- The Lamp Tavern, Dudley
- The King Arthur, Hagley, Stourbridge
- The New Inn, Wordsley
- The Plough and Harrow, Kinver
- The Plough Inn, Shenstone (near Kidderminster)
- The Royal Exchange, Stourbridge
- The Swan Inn, Chaddesley Corbett
- The Unicorn, Wollaston, Stourbridge
- The Vine, Brierley Hill. The Home of Batham's Beer, also known as the Bull & Bladder.
