= David Tristram =

British writer

David Tristram (born 1957 or 1958 in Quarry Bank, UK) is an English comic playwright. He has published 33 plays and comedy novels, and produced and directed three films. Widely performed by amateur and professional groups, his plays have parodied such pop-culture genres as soap operas and detective stories.

Educated at Dudley Grammar School and Birmingham University, where he studied English and music, Tristram was a commercial copywriter before turning to comedy. In 1985 he founded the Flying Ducks Theatre Company, which has now become a professional touring company.

Tristram's plays take a farcical view of sex, alcohol, drugs, crime, politics, and theatre itself. Tristram claims he writes only comedy because he cannot take himself too seriously. He usually tests his new work at a small theatre in Bridgnorth near his home in Highley before wider release. His plays have been performed in South Africa, New Zealand, Mexico and Europe among other locations.

His 2015 film Doreen includes cameo appearances from Robert Plant, Nick Owen, and Steve Bull.

== Books ==
- 2006 A Bolt from the Blue ISBN 978-1900997072
- 2014 Doreen - From Rug-Rats to Riches: Autobiography of a Lazy Cow ISBN 978-1900997140

== Films ==
- 2011 Inspector Drake: The Movie
- 2012 Inspector Drake 2: The Seagull
- 2015 Doreen: The Movie
