= Marion Richardson =

British artist

Marion Elaine Richardson (9 October 1892 – 12 November 1946) was a British educator and author of books on penmanship and handwriting.

== Biography ==
Marion Richardson was born on 9 October 1892 in Ashford, Kent, the second daughter of Walter Marshall Richardson and his wife, Ellen.

=== Education ===
She was the middle of three sisters, and apparently used to entertain the other two with stories after lights out in the bedroom which they shared. She often serialised these over many nights. She joined a story-writing group when still a child – her nom de plume was 'A Mere Girl'.

Richardson was educated at Winchester High School for Girls, Uplands School, and Milham Ford School in Oxford. She trained to be an art teacher at Birmingham Municipal School of Arts and Crafts from 1908 to 1912 where she studied under Robert Catterson Smith who influenced her future work.

=== Teaching career ===
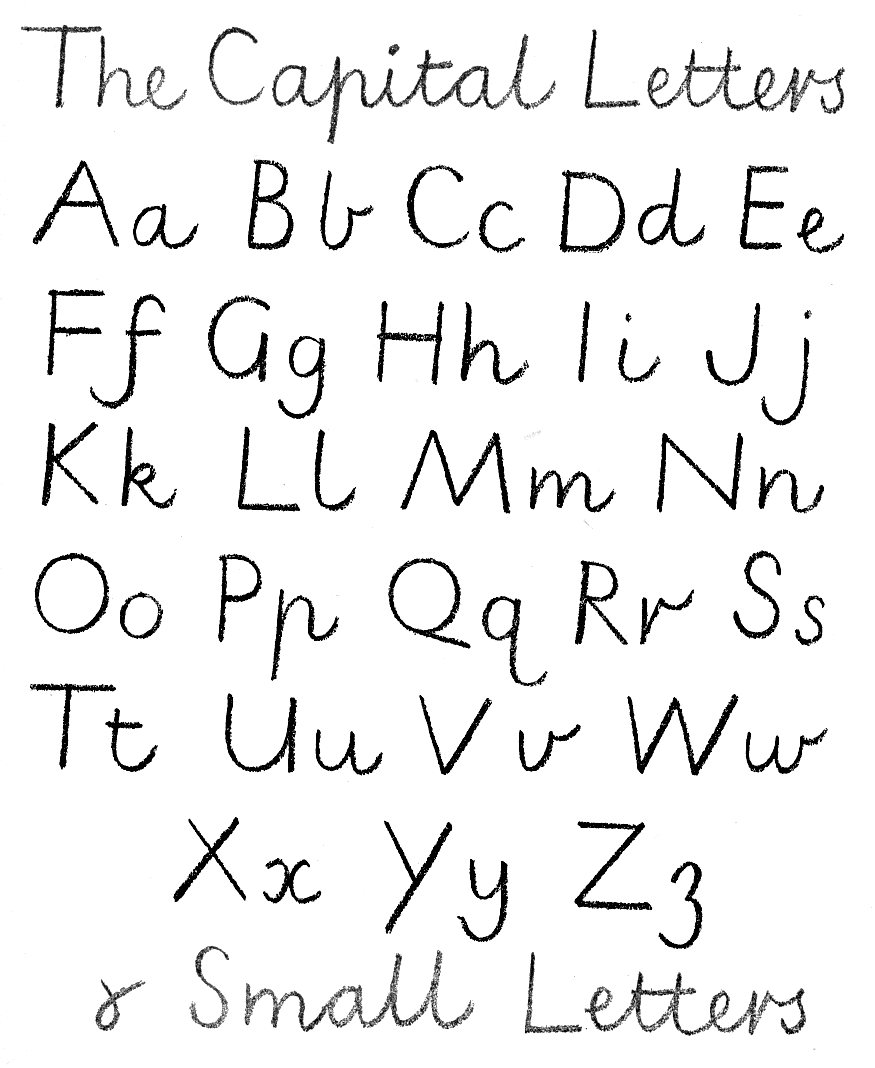
Image from Richardson's Writing and Writing Patterns

During her training she was a pupil teacher at Moseley School of Art, where she also worked as a junior assistant teacher. From 1912 to 1923, Richardson was the art mistress at Dudley Girls High School. In 1915–16 she published a drawing syllabus which was similar to the standard Board of Education drawing programme, but within a year she began to encourage her pupils to produce work with little instruction. She developed her own child-centred methods for teaching art which encouraged self-expression and allowed the pupils to evaluate their own work.

In 1917, her pupils' work was exhibited by Roger Fry, who brought her work to public attention. Richardson was also close to his sister, Margery Fry, who encouraged her to teach art in prisons, including Winson Green prison in Birmingham.

In 1923, Richardson moved to London where she took private pupils and taught voluntarily at Holloway prison. An exhibition of her Dudley pupils' artwork in London in 1923–24 attracted much interest and created a greater demand for her work. In 1924 she visited schools and prisons with her pupils' work in Sweden, Finland and Russia. In 1924 she returned to Dudley part-time and lectured at the London Day Training College to trainee art teachers. She also taught at part-time at Benenden School, Kent, and Hayes Court School, Oxford.

In 1930 she was appointed the inspector of art to the London County Council and continued to run courses for art teachers. She toured Canada in 1934 and in 1935 published Writing and Writing Patterns, a set of hinged cards and booklets for teaching handwriting. In 1938 she organized a large and successful exhibition of children's art at County Hall, London.

=== Later life ===
She retired in 1942 due to her deteriorating health. In September 1945 she returned to Dudley and died on 12 November 1946. She was buried at St John's Church, Kates Hill, Dudley on 15 November 1946.

=== Legacy ===
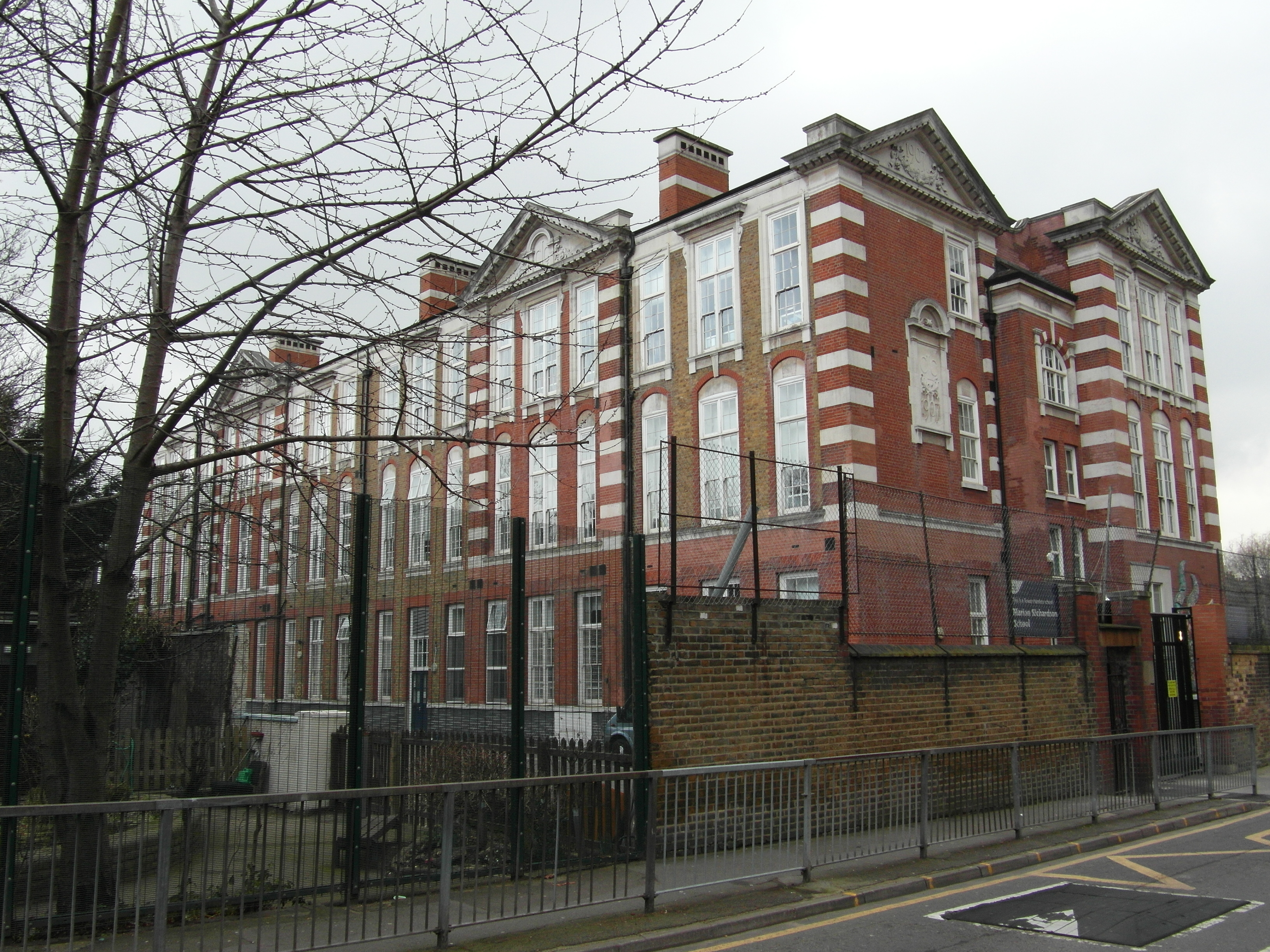
Marion Richardson School in Stepney

Her last work Art and the Child was published posthumously in 1948, and was a great success. Sir Kenneth Clark wrote in his introduction that "I believe that I recognise the same tone of voice which I hear in the dialogues of St. Catherine of Sienna."

Her influence remained after her death and her Writing and Writing Patterns was still used in schools in the 1980s. The Senrab Street School in Stepney, east London was renamed Marion Richardson Primary School in her memory.

Her grave has been rediscovered by the St John's Church Preservation Group. The grave is now being maintained and a start has been made on forming a Marion Richardson Society.

In 2012 an exhibition at Dudley Museum and Art Gallery celebrated her work.

== Publications ==
- Richardson, Marion Elaine (1928). The Dudley Writing Cards. London: G Bell & Sons.
- Richardson, Marion Elaine (1935). Writing & Writing Patterns. London: University of London Press.
- Richardson, Marion Elaine (1948). Art and the Child. London: University of London Press.

== Primary sources ==
The personal papers of Marion Richardson are held in the Birmingham City University Art and Design Archives.

== Published sources ==
- Everitt, Sian (May 2006). "Richardson, Marion Elaine (1892-1946)". Oxford Dictionary of National Biography. Oxford University Press. doi:10.1093/ref:odnb/57053.
- Holdsworth, Bruce, (2009) 'Marion Richardson (1892–1946)'. Eds. Steve Herne (et al.) Readings in Primary Art Education, (Intellect, Bristol) ISBN 978-1-84150-242-7, pp 161–175.
- Smith, Chris, (2010) Tales From A Churchyard, St John's Church, Kates Hill, Dudley, Vol. 1, (St John's Church Preservation Group, Dudley), ISBN 978-0-9555484-2-0. Chapter 3 is devoted to the life of Richardson.
- Sassoon, Rosemary, (2013) Marion Richardson: Her Life and Contribution to Handwriting, ISBN 978-1841505435
