= Dudley Girls High School =

Location
- Priory Road; Dudley, Worcestershire/West Midlands; England; 52.5118°N 2.0829°W

Information
- Type: Grammar school
- Established: 1910
- Closed: 1975 (merged with Dudley Boys Grammar School to form The Dudley School)
- Local authority: County Borough of Dudley/West Midlands
- Gender: Girls
- Age: 11 to 18 (12-18 from 1972)

Dudley Girls' High School was a selective higher education school which provided education for girls aged 11–18 years.

== History ==
It was located in Dudley, England, and opened on 8 December 1910 near the town centre in Priory Road, 12 years after Dudley Grammar School (for boys) moved to neighbouring premises. The school was also known as Dudley High School.

The school traditionally served the 11-18 range, but from September 1972 it served pupils aged 12–18 due to a local reorganisation of education. Despite being a single sex school, the school co-hosted many dramatic and musical productions with the Boys' Grammar School, and by the 1960s boys and girls from the two schools were taught together for some subjects at sixth form level.

Dudley Girls High School served Dudley and its surrounding area for 65 years, before it merged with the grammar school - as well as the Park Secondary Modern School - to form The Dudley School in September 1975, nine years after proposals to merge the two schools were first made. From this date onwards, boys and girls aged 12–18 years were taught in the buildings of both the former grammar school and the high school. The old Park School buildings were retained for two years as an annexe of The Dudley School.

=== After the high school ===
By the mid-1980s, further plans for school reorganisation were afoot, and another merger came in September 1989, this time when the Dudley School merged with The Blue Coat School to form Castle High School - the new school also taking in some of the Sir Gilbert Claughton School pupils upon that school's phased closure, and the creation of the new school was completed in September 1990 with the arrival of some pupils from the closed Mons Hill School.

The creation of Castle High School also led to a decision for the new school to eventually operate solely from the former grammar school site.

The former grammar school buildings were expanded between 1990 and 1995, leaving the former high school buildings disused after February 1995, although a sports hall which had existed on the site since about 1960 was retained for more than a decade afterwards, with a new entrance being built from the old grammar school site to enable the old high school to be demolished.

Dudley council had considered using the old high school as council offices, but these plans were scrapped in favour of demolition, which took place in early 1996.

The site of the school was converted into public car park in 1997, with a campus of Dudley College being opened on the site in September 2012. Although the main school building was demolished, during the site's use as a car park the original wall and site entrance on Ednam Road were retained.

=== Headteachers ===
- Miss M. B. Ambrose - 1950s-1960s
- Miss Fisher - Acting Head
- Freda Kellett - 1964

=== Former teachers ===
- Marion Richardson, art

== Notable alumnae ==
- Mary Percy Jackson, medical practitioner
- Sue Lawley, television newsreader
- Dorothy Round, tennis player
- Jenny Tonge, Baroness Tonge, former Liberal Democrat MP (1997-2005) for Richmond Park, and former doctor
- Jenny Wilkes, BBC Radio WM radio presenter
