= St James's School, Dudley =

St. James's School
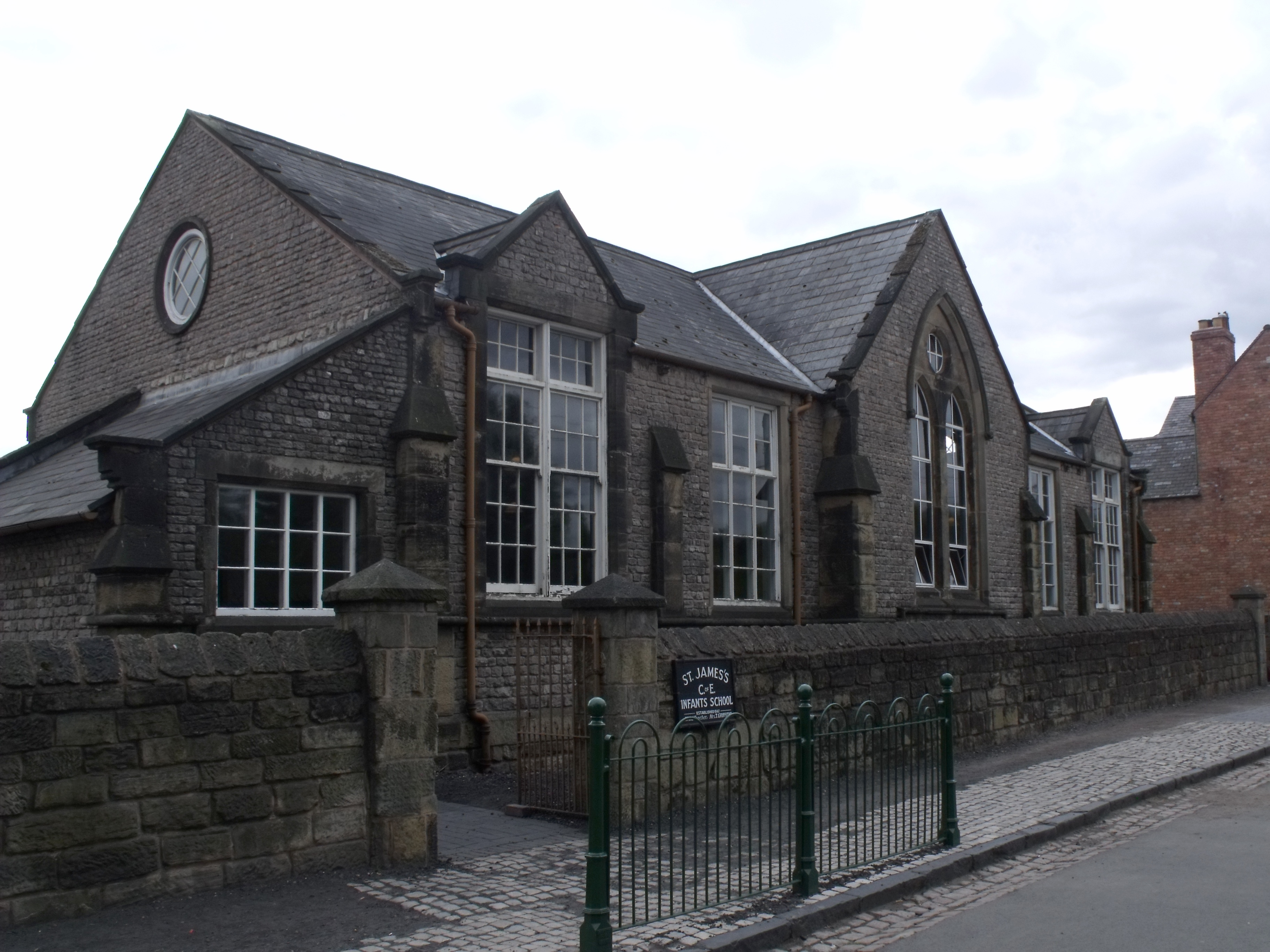

Location
- Salop Street; Dudley, West Midlands; England
- Coordinates: 52°31′21″N 2°04′33″W

Information
- Type: Museum
- Religious affiliation: Church of England
- Established: 1842
- Closed: 1980
- Gender: Coeducational
- Age: 5 to 11

St. James's School opened in the Eve Hill area of Dudley in 1842 for pupils aged 5–11. In 1989–1990 it was demolished, then rebuilt at the Black Country Living Museum.

== History ==
The school was designed by William Bourne, who also designed the nearby church of St James around the same time (the parish of St James was created in 1844). The design of the school was intended to reflect its support from the church.

The school cost just under £500 with the majority of the funds being raised by public subscription. The running costs were to be raised by annual sermons, public donations and the two pennies that the children paid for their schooling every Monday morning. The school opened in 1842 and fund raising methods included the selling of medallions in order that the school could be of sufficient size to accommodate 300 pupils with a new extension at the rear. An alternative estimate was that the two rooms, which could be divided by a partition, were the main focus for a school roll of 200 pupils. They were separated mainly by gender, either side in three or four classes. Early documents referred to each side of the partition as the boys' school and the girls' school. Religious education was emphasised by concentration on the catechism, church doctrine and principles being taught twice every week. The Bible was to be read daily.

The teachers were judged on results and records show that pupils were just taught arithmetic, reading and writing in the weeks before the exams. The teachers were paid £60 or £30 depending on whether they were male or female; female teachers were preferred as they were cheaper. In 1868 the mistress of the school was made redundant when the school management decided that the boys' and girls' schools education could be combined under the previous headmaster, Mr Westbury. In the 1890s the school was upgraded with plaster on the walls, heating and cloakrooms. In 1906 it became an infants school, preparing children for transfer to the Jesson's School when they reached junior age.

== A free school for everyone ==
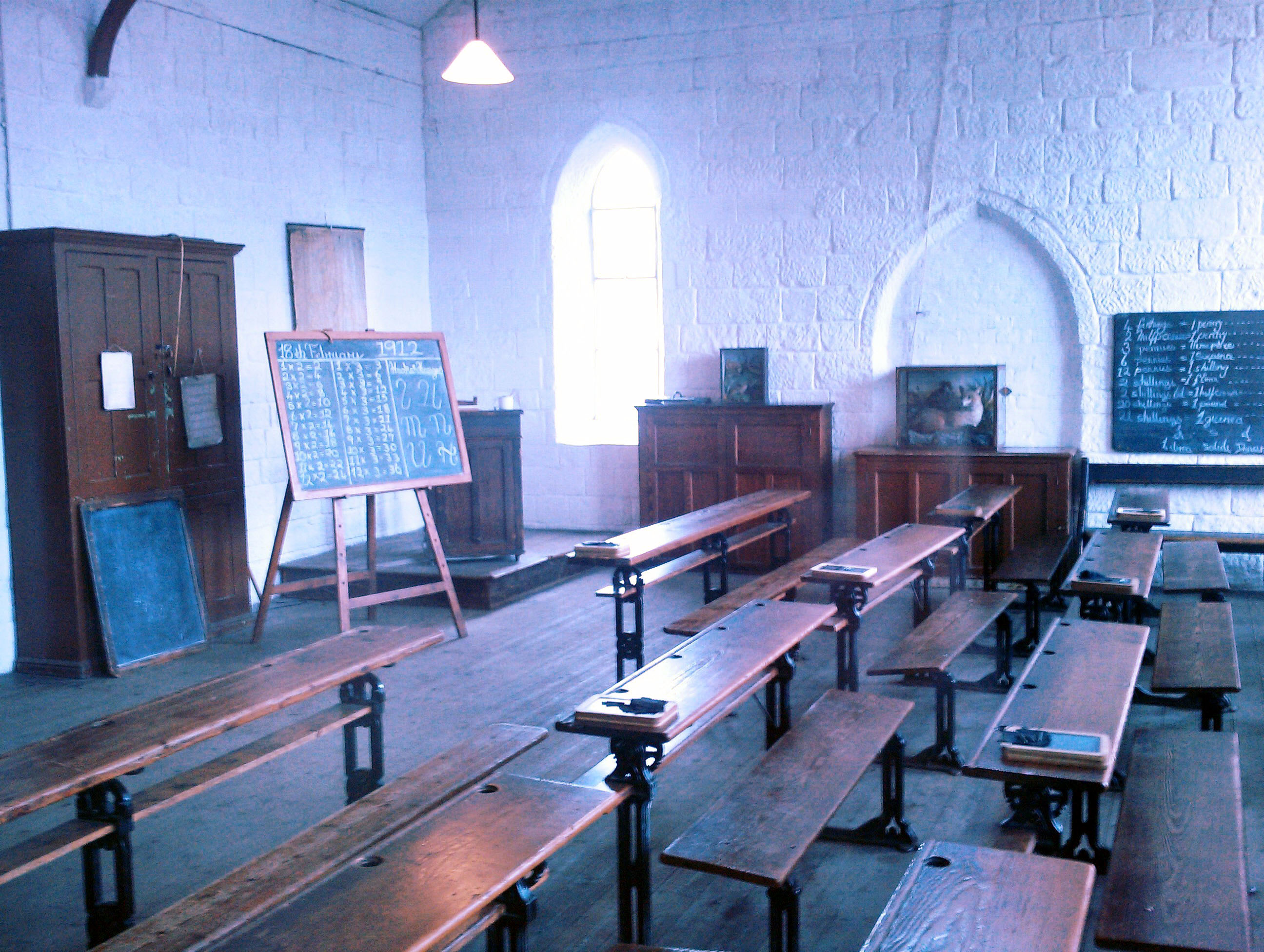
The classroom set out as it was thought to be in 1912

The school was refurbished in 1912, the windows being enlarged substantially, after the school first became free and compulsory. It still suffered from absenteeism around the time of the hop harvest and the Dudley School Board issued medals to encourage attendance.

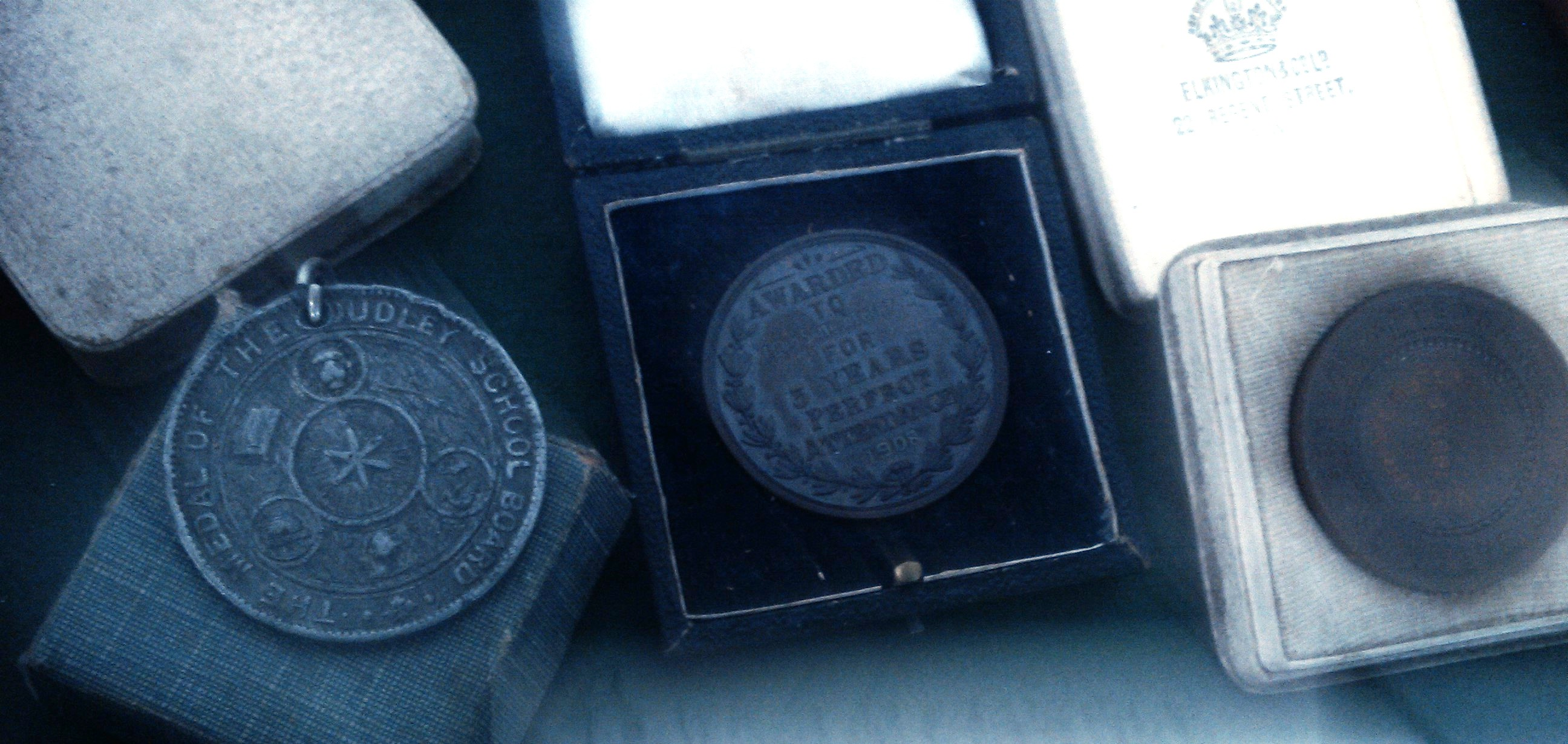
School attendance medals

The school building was improved again in the 1930s. It remained in use until the early 1940s, when the children were moved out until the end of the war so that American forces could use the building. The school was then open again until July 1972, when it finally ceased to be a school in its own right. The building remained in use as a school for a further eight years as overflow for the reorganised Jesson's Middle School (formerly the junior school) until a new school building opened on the Jesson's site in 1980. That was the end of the building as a school after 138 years, but it survived for another a decade at its Eve Hill site. When Jesson's Middle School vacated the building, it was converted into a youth centre before falling short of modern health and safety standards and was thought to be structurally unsafe by 1989.

== As a museum exhibit ==
Black Country Museum officials decided to move the building to its current site in 1989 and the relocation was completed in October 1990, with the exhibit opening to the public in 1991. The move was funded by the Charles Hayward Trust. The Duke of Gloucester carried out an official re-opening on 12 May 1992. The museum drew on the memories of former students to reconstruct how the school would have appeared in 1912, using period fixtures and fittings.
