= Defunct schools in the Metropolitan Borough of Dudley =

Former schools in the West Midlands, England

This article details a number of defunct schools that were only located in the Metropolitan Borough of Dudley.

== Dudley Boys Grammar School ==
Dudley Boys Grammar School was a selective higher education school for boys aged from 11 to 18 years. Founded in 1562, it was located in Dudley, Worcestershire, and opened in July 1898 on its final site in St James's Road. 12 years later Dudley Girls High School opened in nearby buildings on Priory Road. The pupils of the two single-sex schools regularly held drama productions together, and a number of teachers taught at both establishments. The pupils of the two schools mixed on occasions for sixth-form Physics lessons.

In 1966, plans were unveiled for the grammar and high schools to merge and form a mixed comprehensive school, though it would be nearly a decade before the plans would be implemented. In September 1972, the age range had changed from 11-18 to 12-18 as part of a reorganisation by Dudley council which saw the entry age for secondary school increased in the towns of Dudley, Sedgley, Coseley and Brierley Hill. Dudley Grammar School closed in July 1975 after 413 years, when it merged with Dudley Girls High School to form The Dudley School with effect from September 1975. The merger also included the smaller Park Secondary School, which was located near the town's Grange Park, the buildings of which were briefly used as an annex to the new school until 1977.

After more than a century, the buildings of Dudley Grammar School are still in existence. They now house Castle High School, which was formed in September 1989 on the merger of The Dudley School and The Blue Coat School. The grammar school buildings were expanded between 1990 and 1995 as the old High School building was gradually emptied and eventually demolished at the start of 1996. However, the grammar school swimming pool was closed and demolished in 1990 to make way for part of the expansion. The pool had opened in 1951 as a memorial to the former grammar school pupils who had died in the First World War and Second World War. Former pupils of the school were known as Old Dudleians.

Notable former pupils of Dudley Grammar School include Lionel Harry Butler (Principal Royal Holloway College 1973–81), Ian Serraillier (children's author who taught English at the school from 1939 to 1946), Martin Dunn (newspaper editor), Roger Cashmore, David Tristram and Hugh Walters.

== The Dudley School ==
The Dudley School was a mixed comprehensive school in Dudley, West Midlands, England. It was founded in 1975 on the merger of the town's two single-sex grammar schools, Dudley Grammar School and Dudley Girls High School, and was located on the two sites near Dudley town centre. The formation of the school also involved a merger with Park Secondary Modern School, the buildings of which were annexed into the Dudley School for two years until the buildings were closed and demolished to make way for the new Jessons Middle School.

The Dudley School catered for pupils aged from 12 to 18 years. In 1985, just ten years after the Dudley School's formation, Dudley council unveiled plans for it to merge with at least one smaller secondary school to create The Ednam School. One plan put forward at this time was for the Priory Road buildings (formerly the Girls High School) to be developed as a school for children aged up to 16 years, with the former Boys Grammar School buildings being converted into a sixth form college. By 1988, it had been decided that the Dudley School would merge with The Blue Coat School on Kates Hill with effect from September 1989. The school's pupils voted for the new school to be called Castle High, a name which was selected in the spring of 1989. The plan was for Castle High to exist solely at the Dudley School site, but for the first year it also incorporated the Blue Coat buildings for that school's oldest two year groups as sufficient space was not available at the Dudley School site until new buildings were completed and the sixth form was closed due to falling pupil numbers and a decision by the local authority to relocate most of the borough's sixth form facilities from schools to further education colleges. The last intake of sixth form students began their studies at the school in September 1988 and remained there until the sixth form closed in July 1990; there were no admissions to the sixth form at the new school in September 1989. The new school also took in some of the Sir Gilbert Claughton School pupils, with all but the oldest year group in that school being transferred to new schools before it closed completely in July 1990.

The school's final head teacher was Mr Joseph Kenneth "Ken" West, who was head for the final four years until the merger following the retirement of Mr Alfred "Fred" Austin (born Fredi Stiller as a Jew in Czechoslovakia in 1928; and who became Fred Austin upon his adoption by a British family at the outbreak of World War II). Mr Austin had been head since the formation of the Dudley School in 1975 and Mr West was a teacher of Mathematics at the school.

Ian Austin, who served as Member of Parliament for Dudley North, was a pupil at the school from 1977 until 1983. He was the adoptive son of the school's former head teacher.

== Flax Hall Primary School ==
Flax Hall Primary School was a primary school located in Woodsetton, West Midlands, England. It was built in the 1950s in Eve Lane - on the border with Dudley - to serve a newly completed council housing estate which was developed on adjoining farmland. From 1954 to 1981 it was called Parkes Hall Primary School. Pupils attending were aged 5 to 11 years, but from September 1972 the school also provided education for 12-year-olds. Falling numbers on the school roll during the 1980s saw the local authority decide that it was no longer viable, and the school closed in July 1989, merging with Sycamore Green Primary School. However, the Flax Hall buildings were retained as an annexe to Sycamore Green until December 1991, when an extension to the main Sycamore Green site meant that all pupils were taught there and Flax Hall was converted into a training centre for DMBC employees. 52.5323°N 2.1012°W The centre was demolished in 2019 and by the middle of 2020 had been replaced with a new housing estate, built on what is now called Shearing Close.

== Greenhill Middle School ==
Greenhill Middle School was a 9-13 middle school situated in Halesowen, West Midlands (formerly Worcestershire), England. It opened in September 1972 within the buildings of the former Hill & Cakemore Secondary Modern boys and girls schools situated on Long Lane. Its opening coincided with the reorganisation of schools in Halesowen which saw 5-7 infant, 7-11 junior and 11-16/18 secondary schools replaced by 5-9 first, 9-13 middle and 13-18 secondary schools. The old Hill & Cakemore Secondary Modern School was relocated to a site in Kent Road which became known as Leasowes High School, serving pupils aged 13–18. However, three-tier education in Halesowen was a short-lived experiment that lasted only 10 years. It was abolished in July 1982, although the buildings remained as an annexe of Leasowes High School, mostly for the teaching of pupils at the lower end of the new 11-16 age range. The Greenhill site remained in use until 1987, when extensions were completed at the main Leasowes site to accommodate the younger pupils. The Greenhill buildings fell into disuse and were demolished soon after.

== High Park School ==
High Park School was a secondary school located in Stourbridge, West Midlands, England. It was built around 1960 as a secondary modern school to serve the Wollaston area of the town, adopting comprehensive status in September 1975. By the 1980s, pupil numbers at the school were falling and Dudley MBC decided to merge High Park with nearby Longlands School. The merger was completed in September 1990, when Ridgewood High School opened within the High Park buildings. The Longlands School buildings were taken over by Stourbridge College. At the time of Ridgewood's formation, new buildings were added to the High Park site to accommodate the pupils from the old Longlands School.

== Cradley Middle School ==
Cradley Middle School was a 9-13 middle school situated in the Cradley area of Halesowen, West Midlands (formerly Worcestershire), England. It opened in September 1972 when Halesowen Urban District Council abolished the traditional 5-7 infant, 7-11 junior and 11-16/18 secondary schools in favour of 5-9 first, 9-13 middle and 13-16/18 secondary schools. It was situated within the buildings of Cradley Secondary Modern School, which had opened in 1939. In 1974, Halesowen and neighbouring Stourbridge (which had stuck with the traditional school age ranges) were merged into the Metropolitan Borough of Dudley, which had adopted 5-8 first, 8-12 middle and 12-16/18 secondary schools in 1972. The first and middle schools in Halesowen were abolished in July 1982, with the traditional age ranges being reinstated with effect from the school year beginning September 1982. The reorganisation of schools in Halesowen saw Cradley Middle School close down and re-open as Cradley High School, which was based within its buildings. However, the buildings were unsuitable in the long term as a modern secondary school, and by 1990 they had all been demolished as the new Cradley High buildings were developed in pieces. Cradley High was a short-lived school, closing in July 2008 due to falling pupil numbers. The school buildings were knocked down in 2010.

== Longlands School ==
Longlands School was a secondary school located in Stourbridge, West Midlands, England. It was built in 1912 to serve the expanding Stourbridge area as a secondary modern school. The school later gained comprehensive status, but by the 1980s, pupil numbers were falling. Dudley MBC decided to merge Longlands with nearby High Park School, and the merger was completed in September 1990 when Ridgewood High School opened within the High Park buildings. The former Longlands School buildings were then taken over by Stourbridge College, which used the site as a campus for nearly 20 years.

== Mons Hill School ==
Mons Hill School was a secondary school on the Wren's Nest Estate in Dudley, England. It was opened in April 1965 as Wrens Nest Secondary School, to replace Wolverhampton Street School (which had been open since 1880) in Dudley town centre, and gave education to pupils aged 11 to 16 years (with the starting age rising to 12 from September 1972). Construction began in 1963 with the intention of having the school open for the beginning of the academic year in September 1964, but it missed the target completion date by seven months.

On the introduction of comprehensive education across Dudley borough in September 1975, Wrens Nest Secondary School was renamed Mons Hill School. Soon afterwards, Mons Hill was widely regarded as the worst secondary school in the borough; pupil numbers fell and O-Level (GCSE from 1988) results were dismal. By September 1988, just over 200 pupils were on the school roll and Dudley council decided that the school was no longer viable. The school was set to close in July 1991 as part of a reorganisation of education in the borough, which involved several secondary schools being closed or merged, as well as the secondary school entry age in the north of the borough being reverted to 11. However, the loss of some pupils to other local schools, as well as a smaller than expected number of 12-year-olds transferring to the school from primary schools in September 1989, enabled the closure date to be brought forward a year to July 1990, after which remaining pupils and staff were split between Castle High School and the Coseley School. This brought the future of the 25-year-old school buildings into uncertainty. The Coseley School expressed interest in using it as a temporary annex for a few years until adequate classroom space could be created at their Ivyhouse Lane site, and there was also a suggestion that some of the site could be incorporated into Wren's Nest Nature Reserve. However, in September 1990, it became a campus of Dudley College and a multi-million-pound extension with high-quality facilities for skilled trades such as construction, hairdressing and motor engineering was completed in 1993. This replaced a previous annex of Dudley College on nearby Sedgley Road West. However, most of the facilities were transferred to new buildings in Dudley town centre in September 2012. The bulk of the Mons Hill buildings were demolished three years later. Part of the site, including the Construction Centre, remained in use for a further six years, when further new buildings for Dudley College were opened in the town centre. These buildings were then taken over by the Wenlock School, which caters to pupils with special needs. The site of the demolished buildings has since been redeveloped for housing.

Sam Allardyce, former manager of the England national football team, attended the school from 1966 to 1970. 52.527°N 2.094°W

== St. Edmund's Primary School ==
St. Edmund's Primary School was a primary school for pupils aged from 5 to 11 years. It was located in Dudley, West Midlands, England, and was opened during the 19th century. The school merged with St John's Primary School during the 1970s to become St Edmund's and St John's Primary School; it relocated to a site on Kates Hill. The old buildings of St Edmund's have been retained and are currently used as Dudley Central Mosque, although there have been ongoing plans for it to be relocated to a new site in nearby Dixon's Green. 52.5124°N 2.0788°W

== St John's Primary School ==
St John's Primary School was a Church of England primary school situated in Dudley, West Midlands, England. It served the Kates Hill area of the town and was built in 1840 along with the neighbouring parish church on St John's Road. The area of Kates Hill was expanding as a residential area at this time, mostly housing workers who were moving into the Black Country during the Industrial Revolution. The school remained open for 130 years, finally closing in 1974 on its merger with St Edmund's Primary School (on Birmingham Street in the town centre) to form St Edmund's and St John's Church of England Primary School. The new school was located in a building on Hillcrest Road. The old St John's School, now 170 years old, is still in existence and for most of the time since the school's closure the buildings have been in commercial use. The current occupants of the building are a recruitment agency. 52.5088°N 2.0714°W

== Saltwells Secondary School ==
Saltwells Secondary School was a secondary school located in Netherton, West Midlands, England. It was built in 1962+ to replace Halesowen Road School - known locally as The Iron School due to its corrugated iron construction. The school closed in July 1986 due to falling numbers on the school roll, and most of the remaining pupils and staff were transferred to The Hillcrest School, now the only secondary school in Netherton. The school's status changed from secondary modern to comprehensive in September 1975 as part of a borough-wide change to secondary education. The age range changed from 11-15/16 to 12-16 in September 1972, also to fit in with a reorganisation of local education (which was not reverted until 1990). The school buildings remain in use to this day as the site of Saltwells Education Development Centre - the educational development centre which serves the entire Dudley borough.

== Sir Gilbert Claughton School ==
Sir Gilbert Claughton School was a secondary school located on Blowers Green Road in Dudley, England, in the Queen's Cross area of the town. It opened in 1904 and closed in 1990. It opened in 1904 as the Dudley Upper Standard School, but after three years it became the Higher Elementary School. Another name change came in 1929, when it became the Dudley Intermediate School. In December 1957, it adopted the Gilbert Claughton title as the Sir Gilbert Claughton Grammar Technical School. A new classroom block was added in the late 1950s, mostly for the teaching of Science and other practical subjects. The age range was altered from 11-18 to 12-18 in September 1972 and its status changed to comprehensive in September 1975. However, by the mid-1980s numbers were starting to fall and the sixth form centre had been axed, sparking fears that it would close. In 1985, there was talk of The Dudley School being merged with another local secondary school to form The Ednam School, and Sir Gilbert Claughton was one of the schools mentioned in the proposals for this new school. In 1988, there was talk of the school merging with The Blue Coat School on Kates Hill. However, in October 1988 Dudley council decided to merge the Dudley School with Blue Coat to form Castle High (at the main Dudley School site), which opened in September 1989, although Blue Coat would remain open for a year as an annex for the older pupils. In June 1989, just weeks before the end of the academic year, it was announced that all second year (12- to 13-year-old) and third year (13- to 14-year-old) pupils would be transferred from Sir Gilbert Claughton to Castle High or Holly Hall Schools with effect from September - along with the pupils starting secondary school at that time who had originally selected Sir Gilbert Claughton as their destination. However, the oldest remaining year group at the school would remain there until completing their secondary education in July 1990, when the school finally closed after 86 years. It was then turned into offices by Dudley Metropolitan Borough Council, who designated it as the Claughton Centre.

== Walton Girls School ==
Walton Girls School was a girls secondary modern school situated in Halesowen, West Midlands, England. It was built during the 1930s to serve the central area of Halesowen. It remained open for some 50 years, and during the final years of its existence was the only all-girls secondary school in the Dudley borough (which Halesowen became part of in 1974). It was originally a school for girls aged 11 upwards, but was reorganised into a 13-18 comprehensive in September 1972, when three-tier education was introduced in Halesowen. It was reorganised into an 11-16 comprehensive school in September 1982, when it gained two younger year groups but lost its sixth form as all of the town's sixth form facilities were relocated to an expanded Halesowen College. Walton finally closed its doors in July 1985 when it merged with nearby Richmond Boys School to form Windsor High School. The new school was located entirely at the Richmond site from its opening in September 1985, and the Walton buildings were taken over by Halesowen College, who retained it for 18 years before expanding their main Whittingham Road site, after which the Walton Campus was demolished and replaced by housing.

== See also ==
- List of schools in Dudley
