= Maureen Brennan =

English educator and CEO (born 1954)

Dame Maureen Brennan (born 1954) is an English educator from the West Midlands. She is the previous CEO of Matrix Academy Trust, a position she accepted after serving as headteacher at Barr Beacon School and as principal at Hillcrest School and Community College in Netherton, West Midlands.

== Early life and education ==
Born in Erdington before moving to Small Heath where she spent most of her childhood, Brennan attended Holy Family Primary School. Her father was a Detective Superintendent in the West Midlands Police. She was accepted into St Agnes RC Grammar School for Girls before achieving a Bachelor of Education in 1976 from Newman College (now Birmingham Newman University) at the University of Birmingham.

== Career ==
Brennan's first teaching role was as a Geography and PE teacher at St Chad's RC School - a split site school between Aston and Hockley. She then moved to Ladywood School in 1980 where she was Head of Geography. After spending five years working with the Birmingham Advisory and Support Service as a Staff Development Tutor and Equal Opportunities Coordinator, in 1990 she moved to Great Barr School in Great Barr, Birmingham

Brennan worked at Great Barr as a Deputy Head Teacher to over 2,400 students. After a decade at Great Barr, she took over as Principal of Hillcrest School and Community College. Brennan let it be known that Hillcrest School had "no structures, systems or routines" when she took over in September 2000 when it was in special measures. By 2003, the school was rated as "very good" by Ofsted and had "rapidly and impressively improved over the last two and a half years from weakness to its present high position. The School's progress was recognised by the accolade of a national School Achievement Award in 2002. By 2007, Hillcrest was rated Outstanding by Ofsted and Brennan was praised for the turnaround at the school. The report said "Leadership and management at all levels are of the highest standard and make an outstanding contribution to raising attainment within the school."

One of her recipes for changing that was the introduction of a "house system and a prefectorial system". She introduced formal routines such as pupils standing up when someone walks into the classroom; she also got rid of the bells that sounded the end of each lesson. Other measures included a sin bin or exclusion room (dubbed the "doom room" by the pupils) where misbehaving pupils could go for a period of isolation from their peers.

In April 2007, Brennan was appointed as Headteacher of Barr Beacon School, which was also in Special Measures at the time. By 2011, the school was rated Good by Ofsted and since 2014 has been rated Outstanding. Brennan was again praised in the reports. "The Headteacher is relentless in her pursuit for excellence and has brought about significant improvements in the quality of teaching and learning, and the achievement and behaviour of pupils."

In 2017, Brennan was appointed as CEO of Matrix Academy Trust. The Trust currently sponsors five schools across the Midlands, holding over 5,500 students. Both Etone College and Bloxwich Academy have improved from Inadequate to Good ratings under her leadership with Matrix Academy Trust. Her Majesty's Chief Inspector for Ofsted at the time, Sir Michael Wilshaw, praised Brennan in a letter from 2015 regarding Etone College. "Your determined and highly effective leadership, and strong support from senior leaders and the governing body, have played a key part in bringing about rapid changes with the college."

== Other work in Education ==
Brennan contributed to the 2005 Steer Report (Chaired by Sir Alan Steer) on Social Behaviour and Discipline for the Department for Education. She attended five meetings and visited 10 Downing Street for the sixth meeting to discuss the group's findings with the Prime Minister, Secretary of State for Education and the Minister for Schools. The group subscribed to six core beliefs in the report, including how "school leaders have a critical role in establishing high standards of learning, teaching and behaviour."

In 2006 and between 2015 and 2022, Brennan was designated as a National Leader of Education. She was re-elected to the West Midlands Regional Schools Commissioners Headteacher Board in 2017, which consists of a group of academy leaders to help shape the future of schools within the region.

In 2004, Brennan also gained national attention when she uncovered pupils in school were using Rosary beads as a prop for drug dealing. She recognised they were being used in this way and subsequently banned them while she was at Hillcrest School.

== Honours ==
Brennan has over 45 years of experience working in Education. She was awarded Dame Commander of the Order of the British Empire (DBE) in Her Majesty the Queen's Birthday Honours List 2005, for her services to education.

In 2012, Brennan was awarded a Fellowship from the University of Worcester.

== Attendance manipulation charges ==
On 12 December 2007 it was reported that Brennan and her recent senior management team was under investigation for fraudulent reporting of attendance figures during the time she was headteacher at Hillcrest School and Community College.

Dudley Council's investigations ended and the case was passed to the West Midlands Police Economic Crime Team. Brennan was identified in the Dudley report for leading a team of senior managers who EWS (Educational Welfare Service) investigators claim manipulated registers to make the school appear more successful than it actually was. In their interim report, EWS officers alleged that the records created a false impression of improved attendance which promoted the school's image and resulted in higher pupil numbers. West Midlands Police decided there was no case to pursue.

On 13 November 2012 Brennan faced a Teaching Agency professional conduct panel in Coventry. Teaching Agency presenting officer, Bradley Albuery, claimed evidence of “deliberate” misrecording to “pretend attendance was better than it was” and to boost perceptions of Hillcrest School. He said GCSE figures were also distorted from 2004 and 2007 by between two and four per cent showing an “inflation” of results. “It is fanciful to suppose that this headteacher did not know what was going on in her school,” Mr Albuery said. “The evidence suggests these were not occasional errors by teachers.

Brennan faced an allegation of failing to ensure pupils received a statutory level of education. The hearing was told how fraud police launched an investigation in 2007, but no charges were brought. This charge was dismissed early in the hearing. The charge of failing to provide an education was dropped and the three were found not to have altered the PLASC return which could have misrecorded achievement in the school.

On 28 November 2012, Brennan, was found guilty of unacceptable professional conduct by the Teaching Agency. The disciplinary hearing heard “inappropriate” alterations were made to attendance registers for some pupils between 2004 and 2007. The Panel decided no sanction was appropriate in this case. The report stated there was "no suggestion of any harm to children", no "personal financial gain" and Dame Maureen "expressed remorse" and had "an impeccable previous history."

== Departure ==
In July 2022, it was announced Brennan will be retiring from her role as Chief Executive of Matrix Academy Trust.
