= Milking Bank =

Residential area of Dudley, West Midlands, England

Coordinates: 52.516°N 2.117°W

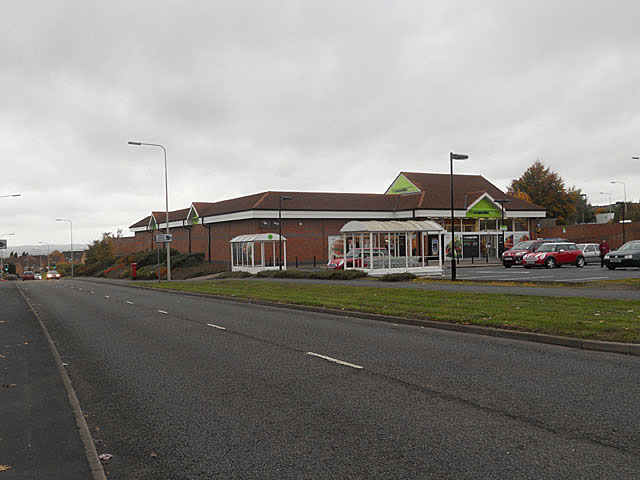
The local Co-op at Milking Bank

Milking Bank is a residential area of Dudley, West Midlands, England.

It is a modern development which began in about 1984 with the construction of new houses in an isolated area more than a mile to the west of Dudley town centre, near the border with Sedgley, which had been mined for coal since the 19th century. Further developments of private housing took place on this land between Himley Road and Dibdale Road and by the end of the 1980s there were several hundred houses in Milking Bank, as well as a primary school.

Further development took place after the demolition of nearby Burton Road Hospital in 1994, with the construction of further housing on the north side of Dibdale Road. At the end of the decade, further houses - as well as a Co-operative society supermarket - were built on the west of Milking Bank joining onto Grosvenor Road. This latest development was a mix of private homes as well as ones leased out by a housing association.

The estate is served by a public house, the Meadow Lark, as well as a doctor's surgery.

A Spar minimarket opened in the mid-1980s, around the time that the first houses were built. This later became a Bargain Booze store, but it was burnt down in a suspected arson attack in 2011. This was then rebuilt and for a short time opened as a Costcutter, but by January 2015 had closed. As of June 2018 this shop is now occupied by a "local" shop franchise.
