= The Link Academy =

- Logo of the school

Location
- Simms Lane; Netherton, Dudley, West Midlands, DY2 0PB; England; 52.4929°N 2.0879°W

Information
- Type: Academy
- Established: 2018-19
- Local authority: Dudley
- Trust: Dudley Academies Trust
- Department for Education URN: 144952 Tables
- Ofsted: Reports
- Principal: Emma Edwards-Morgan
- Gender: All
- Age: 11 to 16
- Capacity: 1050
- Telephone: 01384 986550
- Website: Official website

The Link Academy, formerly known as the Hillcrest School and Community College, is a secondary school located in the Netherton area of Dudley, West Midlands, England.

== History ==
The school was first opened in 1958 as one of two new secondary schools in Netherton, the other being the Saltwells Secondary School. Both schools replaced a smaller pre-fabricated school in Halesowen Road, known locally as "The Iron School". Saltwells School closed in 1986, with pupils and staff transferred to an expanded Hillcrest, though due to a lack of capacity some pupils had to attend other nearby schools.

In January 2019, Mrs Emma Edwards-Morgan was appointed the new Principal of The Link Academy by Dudley Academies Trust. Previous Headteachers of The Link Academy have included: April Garratt, who took over in Easter 2007. Her predecessor, Dame Maureen Brennan, was appointed a Dame Commander of the Most Excellent Order of the British Empire in December 2005, in recognition of her services to local education after turning around the formerly struggling school. However, allegations of fraud involving doctoring attendance records emerged after her departure from the school in 2007.

In February 2017, plans were announced for the school to become part of a new academy sponsored by Dudley College, alongside Castle High School, Holly Hall School, and High Arcal School. The academy opened in September 2017, with the school's name officially changing a year later.
