= Don Kenyon =

English cricketer

Personal information
- Full name: Donald Kenyon
- Born: 15 May 1924; Wordsley, Staffordshire, England
- Died: 12 November 1996 (aged 72); Worcester, England
- Batting: Right-handed
- Bowling: Right-arm medium

International information
- National side: England
- Test debut: 2 November 1951 v India
- Last Test: 7 July 1955 v South Africa

Career statistics
Competition	Test	First-class
Matches	8	643
Runs scored	192	37,002
Batting average	12.80	33.63
100s/50s	0/1	74/180
Top score	87	259
Balls bowled	–	206
Wickets	–	1
Bowling average	–	187.00
5 wickets in innings	–	0
10 wickets in match	–	0
Best bowling	–	1/8
Catches/stumpings	5/–	326/–
- Source: CricInfo, 7 November 2022

Donald Kenyon (15 May 1924 – 12 November 1996) was an English first-class cricketer, who played in eight Tests for England from 1951 to 1955. He captained Worcestershire between 1959 and 1967.

Cricket writer, Colin Bateman, noted, "A polished batsman who relished taking on fast bowlers, he became the heaviest scorer in Worcestershire's history with more than 37,000 first-class runs to his credit".

== Life and career ==
Kenyon was born in Wordsley, Staffordshire on 15 May 1924, and lived most of his adult life in nearby Wollaston, West Midlands. He played all his county cricket for Worcestershire, but when international opportunities came along, Kenyon was unable to produce his run-making abilities on the highest stage. He fell in single figures in eleven of his fifteen England innings, although his Test career was rather sporadic in nature. Kenyon played three Tests on the 1951/52 tour to India, two more in 1953, with three more appearances in 1955, but life in the fast lane did not seem to suit his temperament.

He was a captain of Worcestershire and captained the club in its first ever County Championship winning season in 1964 and second title the following year. He retired from first class cricket in 1967 and later became an England Test selector, and President of his county side.

Kenyon died in November 1996, in Worcester, at the age of 72.

Sporting positions
Preceded by Peter Richardson	Worcestershire County Cricket Captain; 1959–1967	Succeeded by Tom Graveney
