= Jesson's Church of England Primary School =

Location
- School Street; Dudley, West Midlands, DY1 2AQ; England
- Coordinates: 52.5111°N 2.0949°W

Information
- Type: Voluntary aided primary school
- Religious affiliation: Church of England
- Established: 1856; 170 years ago
- Founder: John Williams Jesson
- Local authority: Dudley Metropolitan Borough Council
- Department for Education URN: 103845 Tables
- Ofsted: Reports
- Head teacher: Sarah Lea
- Gender: Mixed
- Age range: 3–11
- Enrolment: 628
- Capacity: 627
- Website: www.jessons.dudley.sch.uk

Jesson's Church of England Primary School is a 3–11 mixed, Church of England, voluntary aided primary school in Dudley, West Midlands, England. It has existed since the 19th century, but the current school building was erected in 1980 on part of the site that was occupied by Park Secondary School until the 1970s.

The school traditionally existed as separate infant and junior schools, but merged to form a single primary school in September 1989.

== Location ==
Jesson’s Church of England Primary School is located in the central Dudley area and is surrounded by Edwardian housing and some light industry. It occupies part of the site once belonging to Park School. School buildings have dominated this area for a good century.

“In 1885 the area was an expanse of open fields, bordered by Grange Road, (a mere track) to the west and Russell Street to the south. To the North were large grounds that belonged to a large building known as “The Shrubbery”,

The shrubbery has long gone, but the name Jesson has remained and was appropriately used for the new school which now stands where Park School used to be, maintaining an important historical link with this area of Dudley.

1895 was the year Park (Demonstration) School opened and the O.S Map for 1901 shows the school building dominating what used to be open fields. Terraced housing now encloses the square on three sides with only the Shrubbery site remaining unchanged. To coincide with the establishment of the school, School Street was built to link Grange Road with another new thoroughfare, Nelson Road. Dividing Park Boys School from the girls and infants, another new road, Grange Street, was added.

A field adjacent to the square occupied by the school was needed to meet the increase in population. New housing went hand in hand with the new school and both Alexander Street and Edward Street were built at this time. It is heartening to discover however that the open space the other side of Grange Road to the west of the school site, which was developed into The Grange Recreation Ground between 1885 and 1901, still exists today as Grange Park.

== History pre-1927 ==
Jesson’s School was founded in August 1856 by the "Will and Foresight" of John Williams Jesson (1767–1855)). Old directories list him as a Boot and Shoe Maker, Cheapside, Dudley. Mr. Jesson died, from bronchitis, aged 75, at Victoria Terrace on 13 March 1855. He was buried in his vault in St. Edmund churchyard on the 20th of the same month. His portrait hangs in the entrance hall of the present school.

Early in his will, only written 10 days before his death, John Williams Jesson named nine trustees to whom he bequeathed £10,000 which was to be invested:

‘towards supporting and establishing a school in Dudley for the education of boys between the age of seven and fourteen years being children of poor persons who from time to time for the time being shall at the time of their admission of their children upon the foundation of the school to be established under this my will be parishioners of and inhabitants with the Parishes of Dudley and Sedgley or within one mile of the said Parishes.’

The original Charity School opened on Monday 7 July 1856 in rented premises at nearby Shaver’s End. The boys were to be taught reading, writing and arithmetic; they were clothed and at 14 were placed into apprenticeships or ‘otherwise placed in the world’ – ensuring a suitable position in society.

Over the years the school increased its numbers to forty. By 1880 a more suitable accommodation was purchased at Eve Hill where it continued to flourish for a further 28 years as a boys’ Charity School.

In 1902 changes in Education were afoot and Jesson’s became a public elementary school and in 1906 it took in the older children from nearby St. James' School.

In 1908 Regulations, drawn up by the Dudley Educational Foundation, set out the conditions under which boys could become "Free placers" at Grammar School.

== History post 1926 ==
As a result of the Hadow Report, Jesson’s became a Junior Mixed School. At the end of 1927, after the Managers of the seven Dudley Voluntary Schools had submitted proposals for the extensions of their schools, it was decided the Jesson Charity School should be adapted: ‘as a school for children of both sexes’.

Two years later the extensions were seen to be:

‘such as to amount to the provision of a new school, which on completion would provide accommodation for not more than 198 Junior Mixed Children.’

During the years 1968 and 1969 there was a great deal of debate regarding the future of Church Schools in Dudley, the outcome of which was to be the substitution of St Thomas’s Voluntary Aided School for a School in the former Park Primary School, to be known as Jesson’s Church of England Voluntary Aided School.

In 1970, following the re-organisation in Central Dudley, Jesson’s was re-established with separate departments - Nursery, Infant (5–7 years) and Junior (7–11 years). In 1972, it became a 5-8 First School and 8-12 Middle School. The oldest year group in the school were taught at the former St James's Church of England school on Salop Street.

Plans for a new school had been discussed throughout the 1970s. The Foundation Trustees, supported by the endowments of St. Thomas’s and St. James’s schools, fulfilled their obligations and financed a new building for the Middle School children, which was opened in September 1980. This saw the St James's site declared redundant and the building converted into a youth centre; it closed in 1989 to be relocated brick by brick to the Black Country Museum.

In September 1989, Jesson’s turned full circle when the first and middle schools amalgamated to form Jesson’s Church of England Primary School. However, the newly formed school was housed in separate buildings. A further change took place a year later when the leaving age across the borough was reduced from 12 to 11.

The Foundation Trustees saw fit to finance an extension to the existing Junior building in order to house the Infant Department. The ‘true’ amalgamation was complete in September 1996, with the coming together of all the Departments on one site.

The nursery and what was the old swimming pool, which housed two Reception classes, was replaced with a brand new Foundation Unit for the education of the nursery and reception children. This building was opened in January 2006. It was later blessed by the Bishop of Worcester.

In February 2014, Jesson's CE Primary School was chosen from a list of sixty schools to star in a video showcasing a day in the life of a Church of England school. The video was sent to every Diocese in the country to coincide with Education Sunday; this is a national day that has been marked every year since 1827 and is traditionally the ninth Sunday before Easter.
