= A Bolt from the Blue (play) =

A Bolt from the Blue is British comedy book and play by David Tristram.

First published in 2006 and subsequently performed by Tristram's Flying Ducks troop, it follows his normal genre of comedic investigation.

== Synopsis ==
Edward Jones was just an ordinary man, doing ordinary things - until the day before his fortieth birthday. What happened next was, quite literally, incredible. It defies belief. It defies logic. It defies the fundamental laws of science and nature. But it happened. And it came like a bolt from the blue.

== Cast ==
Min.

- 2xMen
- 1xWoman
