= Shenstone, Worcestershire =

Village in Worcestershire, England

Coordinates: 52.360191°N 2.202759°W

Shenstone
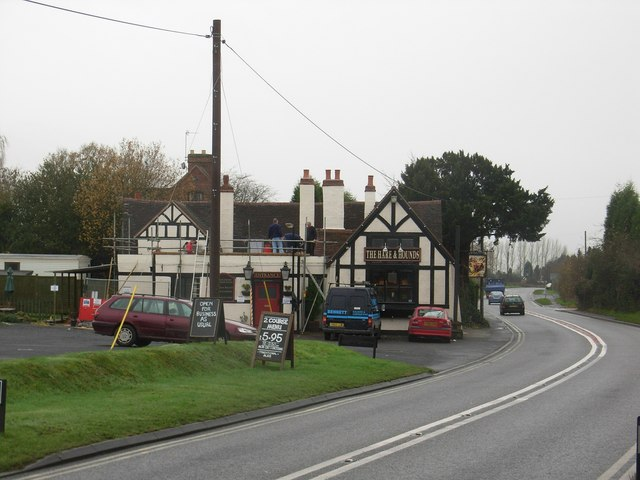
- The Hare and Hounds

- Location within Worcestershire
- OS grid reference: SO862735
- Civil parish: Stone
- District: Wyre Forest
- Shire county: Worcestershire
- Region: West Midlands
- Country: England
- Sovereign state: United Kingdom
- Post town: KIDDERMINSTER
- Postcode district: DY10
- Police: West Mercia
- Fire: Hereford and Worcester
- Ambulance: West Midlands

Shenstone is a village in Worcestershire, England, located near Kidderminster. It lies within the civil parish of Stone, which in 2021 had a population of 793.
