= Ridgewood High School, Wollaston =

Ridgewood High School

Location
- Park Road West; Wollaston, West Midlands, DY8 3NQ; England
- Coordinates: 52.4577°N 2.1738°W

Information
- Type: Academy
- Motto: Achieving Excellence Together
- Local authority: Dudley
- Department for Education URN: 141712 Tables
- Ofsted: Reports
- Headteacher: Rae Cope
- Gender: Coeducational
- Age: 11 to 16
- Enrolment: 840
- Houses: Ash, Maple, Oak, Chestnut
- Website: http://www.ridgewood.dudley.sch.uk/

Ridgewood High School is a coeducational secondary school, a part of the Stour Vale Academy Trust situated in Wollaston (near Stourbridge), in the West Midlands county of England.

== History ==
Ridgewood High School opened in September 1990 on the merger of High Park School and Longlands School (former secondary modern schools), and exists within the buildings of High Park School, which were laid out some thirty two years earlier.

The reorganization of schools which saw the creation of Ridgewood was part of borough-wide changes in 1989 and 1990 which saw another new school, (Castle High), being created by a merger of two schools as well as two small secondary schools closing down.

In the autumn of 2008, a new building was added which included a dance studio, music rooms, Science lab and ICT suites. This followed the building of an Eco-centre at the rear of the school which is used as a Science lab and a community meeting room.

Previously a foundation school administered by Dudley Metropolitan Borough Council, Ridgewood High School converted to academy status in March 2015 and in 2018 changed to join the Stour Vale Academy Trust

== Ofsted ==
Ridgewood High School was inspected by Ofsted for the first time after becoming an academy between 27–28 February 2018 resulting in an overall effectiveness rating of Inadequate.

As of 2021, the school's most recent inspection was in 2019, with a judgement of Requires Improvement.
