= Wollaston, West Midlands =

Village in the West Midlands, England

Coordinates: 52.46193°N 2.16627°W

Wollaston
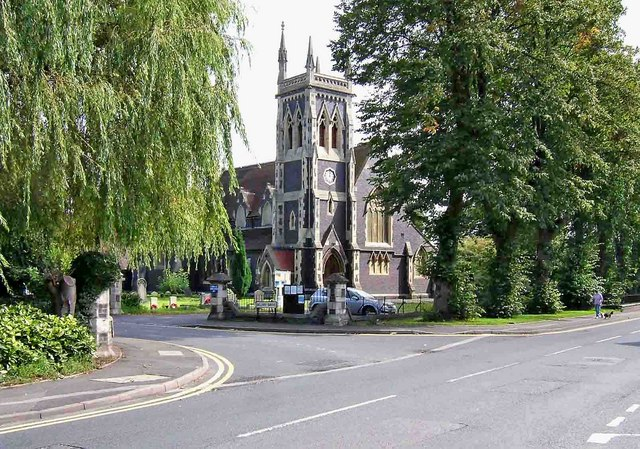
- St James C of E Church

- Location within the West Midlands
- Population: 13,092 (2011.Ward. Wollaston and Stourbridge Town)
- OS grid reference: SO888849
- Metropolitan borough: Dudley
- Metropolitan county: West Midlands
- Region: West Midlands
- Country: England
- Sovereign state: United Kingdom
- Post town: Stourbridge
- Postcode district: DY7 DY8
- Police: West Midlands
- Fire: West Midlands
- Ambulance: West Midlands
- UK Parliament: Stourbridge

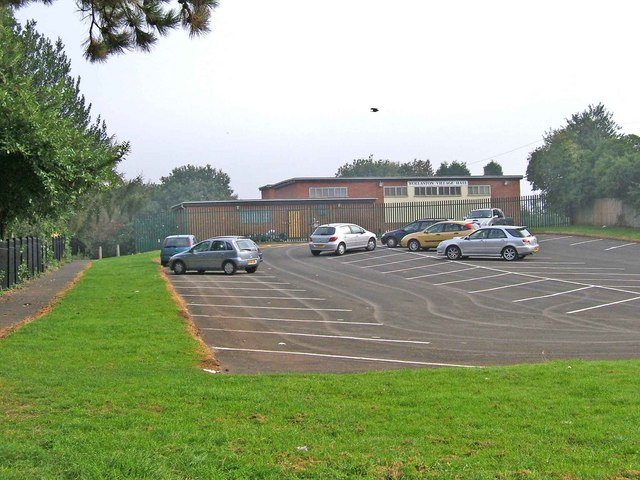
Wollaston Village Hall Community Centre and car park

Wollaston is a village on the outskirts of Stourbridge, in the county of the West Midlands, England. It is in the south-west of the Metropolitan Borough of Dudley, about one mile to the west of Stourbridge town centre.

== Etymology ==
The name Wollaston is taken to originate from the personal name Wulflāf and farm. Documents show various forms of the name, including Woolweston in 1708.

== History ==
Unlike namesakes Wollaston, Northamptonshire and Wollaston, Shropshire, this Wollaston is not listed in the Domesday Survey of 1086.

A map from 1782 shows Wollaston Hall and a cluster of cottages where today Vicarage Road meets High Street. By 1827 this oldest part of the village included a windmill and the Barley Mow Inn; in addition there was a watermill on the Stour and a few cottages around the Gate Hangs Well Inn where High Park Avenue meets the Bridgnorth Road.

Wollaston was formerly a township and chapelry in the parish of Old Swinford, in 1866 Wollaston became a separate civil parish, on 1 April 1974 the parish was abolished. In 1951 the parish had a population of 5747.

Until 1974 when the West Midlands metropolitan county was created, Wollaston was in Worcestershire.

=== Wollaston Hall ===
Wollaston Hall was a 17th-century mansion which stood in the village until 1926. Victoria County History of 1913 describes the front elevation of "five gables filled with ornamental half-timbering disposed in quatrefoil panels". The Hall was later disassembled and shipped to North America, although nobody has been able to determine what happened to it. Panelling and a fireplace from the Hall are in the Edsel and Eleanor Ford House in Grosse Pointe Shores, Michigan. The Wollaston Hall site was redeveloped for housing in the 1930s.

=== Birthplace of steam locomotive ===
The Stourbridge Lion, built in Wollaston, was the first steam locomotive to run on a commercial line in the United States. Built by Foster, Rastrick and Company in Wollaston, the Stourbridge Lion's historic first run took place on 8 August 1829. The locomotive is now on view at the B&O Railroad museum, Baltimore MD, on loan from the Smithsonian Institution, Washington.

The foundry in Lowndes Road where the Stourbridge Lion was built, was under threat of demolition until work started in 2013/2014 to form the multimillion-pound Lion Health Centre.

=== Wollaston village school ===
Wollaston New Schools next to St James' Church opened on 28 February 1859. G Bidlake of Wolverhampton was architect. The buildings initially housed a mixed infants school and a separate school for older boys. A Girls' School had opened by 1861. Edward Hackwood, the first headmaster of the Boys' School held the position for 40 years. Joe Pearson, who had previously played football for Aston Villa and was a member of the club's 1905 FA Cup winning team was appointed headmaster in September 1919. The schools had capacity for 534 children in 1926. Pearson retired as headmaster in April 1946; he was also Mayor of Stourbridge for two years from November 1941. The school was extended in 1959 with the building of a hall, two classrooms, offices and a lavatory block and became a Junior School after the Infants were transferred to Meadow Park Infants' School. Wollaston School closed in 1984; the original buildings have been converted for use as offices.

=== Historical population ===
Population of Wollaston township/parish taken from national censuses.

Population growth in Wollaston 1871–1951
Year	Pop.	±%
1871	2,166	—
1881	2,414	+11.4%
1891	2,333	−3.4%
1901	2,655	+13.8%
1911	3,088	+16.3%
1921	3,160	+2.3%
1931	4,048	+28.1%
1951	5,747	+42.0%
Source: A Vision of Britain through Time

=== Wollaston Farm ===
The land of Wollaston Farm began to be developed for housing in the early 1950s. The almost circular Kingsway is the main road; roads off were named after English counties. The Wollaston Free Church building on Somerset Drive started out as the clubhouse of Stourbridge Rugby Club. It was first used for worship in 1967; a foyer, heightened roof and illuminated spire have since been added.

=== Wollaston Illuminations ===
The "Wollaston Illuminations" in Leonard Road were an annual Christmas lights display which attracted people from all over the Black Country to raise money for a chosen charity. Johnny Briggs, who played Mike Baldwin in the ITV soap Coronation Street and who lived in Stourbridge, switched on the lights several times over the years. In 2006, residents of Leonard Road decided to cancel the illuminations as a protest to food and drink vendors 'cashing in' on the fundraising event.

== Present ==
Wollaston's main thoroughfare is Bridgnorth Road (A458), which is home to a few pubs, restaurants and shops. The Unicorn Inn is a Bathams pub which was built in 1859.

In 2014, Lion Health medical centre opened in the renovated former foundry of Foster, Rastrick and Company, a Grade II listed building. The next phase of regeneration on the foundry site will create parkland next to Stourbridge Canal with a "heritage and community hub" named Riverside House.

== Governance ==
Wollaston is part of the Wollaston and Stourbridge Town ward for elections to Dudley Metropolitan Borough Council. For elections to the House of Commons it is part of Stourbridge constituency.

Public services were the responsibility of the Vestry Committee from the formation of the parish in 1860 until the Local Government Act, 1894 curtailed its powers. The Vestry Committee, among other functions, installed streetlamps, named new roads and renamed existing ones, provided number plates for houses and street name signage, and was responsible for road maintenance. Wollaston chose to become part of Stourbridge Urban District rather than becoming a separate civil parish and in December 1894 elected three of twenty one councillors to serve on the new urban district council. Wollaston also elected one councillor to Worcestershire County Council.

== Education ==
Wollaston has two primary schools – The Ridge Primary School, which opened in 1968 and St James's C of E Primary, a merger in 1984 of the village school with Meadow Park Infants' School.

Ridgewood High School is on the site of High Park School, which opened in 1958. High Park merged with Longlands School in 1990 to form Ridgewood.

== Religious sites ==
Authorisation for the creation of the new parish of Wollaston was given by the Ecclesiastical Commissioners on 10 November 1859. Prior to this Wollaston was part of the ancient parish of Oldswinford. St James' Church was formally opened on 15 April 1960 on land donated by William Orme Foster of John Bradley & Co iron works and Member of Parliament for South Staffordshire. The church is of blue brick and bath stone and The Builder describes the style as fourteenth-century Gothic. The architect was G Bidlake of Wolverhampton. The church and its surrounding railings and gatepiers together with the vicarage are Grade II listed. A vestry was added in October 1935 and the church hall was opened in June 1995.

== Transport ==
The Stourbridge Canal skirts around the village linking the Staffordshire and Worcestershire Canal with the Dudley No. 1 Canal, this places Wollaston on the Stourport Ring.

The nearest railway station is Stourbridge Town.

The Stourbridge to Bridgnorth A458 road runs through the village. The route was turnpiked from 1816 until 1877.

Between 1901 and 1930, Wollaston was served by an electric tramway, the Kinver Light Railway. Following the tramway's closure Midland Red buses served the village, followed by West Midlands Passenger Transport Executive by 1976 and West Midlands Travel from 1986. The main bus services are National Express West Midlands service 7 and 8 which connects Wollaston to Stourbridge, Dudley and the Merry Hill Shopping Centre. The 8 service continues to Wolverhampton but it is quicker to change on to service 16 at Stourbridge Interchange. Diamond Bus service 25/25A also serves the area. Diamond Bus 242 serves the village every hour, providing another service to Stourbridge and a service to Kinver.

== Public houses ==
Wollaston has had fifteen public houses over the years. The oldest extant is The Gate Hangs Well on High Park Avenue which is shown on a map from 1827. The Barley Mow, High Street is shown on the same map but its rebuilt premises have been converted into a Sainsbury's Local. The Forester's Arms and The Plough both on Bridgnorth Road at the western edge of the village are recorded in trade directories of 1852 and 1851 respectively. The Unicorn also on Bridgnorth Road is listed in a 1865 trade directory and is currently owned by local brewer, Bathams.

== Notable residents ==
- Frank Short, British printmaker and teacher of printmaking was born in Wollaston.
- Norman Whiting, English first-class cricketer was born in Wollaston.
- Don Kenyon, English first-class cricketer lived most of his adult life in Wollaston.
- Jan Pearson, actress known for her roles in Holby City and Doctors, was born and raised in Wollaston.
