= Windsor High School, Halesowen =

Windsor High School and Sixth Form

Location
- Richmond Street; Halesowen, West Midlands, B63 4BB; England

Information
- Type: Academy
- Motto: Excellence for All
- Established: 1939
- Local authority: Dudley
- Specialist: Sports College
- Department for Education URN: 136618 Tables
- Ofsted: Reports
- Headmaster: Gavina Raindi
- Staff: 90+
- Gender: Co-Educational
- Age: 11 to 18
- Enrolment: 1,700+ pupils
- Houses: Tudor, Stuart, Lancaster, York, Hanover
- Colours: [Badge] Yellow, Blue, Red and Silver. [Ties] Yellow, White, Red, Green and Blue.
- Coordinates: 52°27′5.5″N 2°3′31.9″W

Windsor High School is a secondary school with academy status located on Richmond Street, Halesowen, West Midlands, England. It is among the largest schools in the region, with capacity for 1,700 pupils aged 11 to 18, and is heavily over-subscribed.

== History ==
The school was built during the 1930s by Worcestershire County Council as Halesowen County Secondary Modern Boys' School, a secondary modern school. Girls living in the local area attended nearby Halesowen County Secondary Modern Girls' School.

During the late 1960s and early 1970s the school was known as the Halesowen County Secondary School for Boys (HCSSB). The school colours were maroon and yellow.

In September 1972, the schools became "Richmond Boys' School" and "Walton Girls' School", initially as secondary modern schools providing education for pupils aged 13–18 years, following a reorganisation of education in Halesowen which saw a switch to three-tier schooling. A reorganisation in September 1982 saw both schools convert to 11–16 age range, with the sixth form being abolished in favour of a move to tertiary education which saw all of Halesowen's post-16 education facilities incorporated into an expanded Halesowen College.

In September 1983, the first Windsor High School pupils joined, co-existing with the pupils from last two years of Richmond High School for Boys. Windsor High School came into existence in September 1985 when the two single-sex schools merged into one mixed comprehensive, after this period of dual-school name. This was the end of single-sex state schools in the Dudley borough; all the other remaining single sex schools had been abolished in July 1975 in favour of mixed comprehensives from September of that year.

The new school was located entirely on the site of the boys' school, with substantial extensions. In the early 1990s Windsor High became a Grant Maintained school. The Walton site on Bundle Hill was taken over by Halesowen College, who used it as an annexe until July 2003. It was demolished shortly afterwards and replaced by a housing estate.

A sixth form centre opened at Windsor High in September 2010, marking a return of sixth form facilities in Halesowen secondary schools after an absence of nearly 30 years.

== Academics ==
Windsor High School and Sixth Form is currently one of the highest-performing schools in Dudley Local Education Authority (LEA). It is currently ranked third in Dudley, behind Old Swinford Hospital and Bishop Milner Catholic School. In 2005 65% of pupils at the school achieved 5 A*-C grades in their GCSEs, and in 2006/2007, 90% of pupils achieved an A* grade.

The number of admissions for the year commencing 1 September 2007 was 280, which became the approved admissions number. The school has been awarded Artsmark Gold and Sportsmark Gold as well as the National Achievement Award for Improvement in Examinations in recent years.
