= The Blue Coat School, Dudley =

School in West Midlands, United Kingdom

The Blue Coat School

Location
- Beechwood Road; Dudley, West Midlands, DY2 7QA; England
- Coordinates: 52°30′41″N 2°04′11″W

Information
- Established: 1869
- Closed: 1989
- Local authority: Dudley
- Department for Education URN: 127146 Tables
- Ofsted: Reports
- Gender: Coeducational
- Age: 12 to 16 (at time of closure)

The Blue Coat School was a mixed secondary school located in Dudley, England. It was opened in 1869 within buildings in Bean Road, several hundred yards east of Dudley town centre. It expanded in 1970 to take in the buildings of Rosland Secondary School, Beechwood Road, at nearby Kates Hill, but the Bean Road site was still used for some lessons until 1981, when it was finally declared redundant after 112 years and sold to make way for a residential development.

Rosland Secondary School first opened in 1932, serving the new council estates which were being built as an extension to the 19th century Kates Hill area.

Perhaps its most famous pupil was British comedian Lenny Henry, who attended from 1969 until 1974. Robert Hawthorne, the Sky Sports TV commentator, was also a pupil from 1977 to 1981, and James Whale was a student in the 1910s.

The school traditionally had an entry age of 11 years, but in September 1972 it was redesignated as a 12–16 school (gaining comprehensive status three years later) and this age range remained in place until the school's closure.

By 1988, the school's future was under threat as it was named by Dudley MBC as one of the schools being considered for closure as part of a restructuring of education in the borough.

The Blue Coat School finally closed in August 1989 when it merged with The Dudley School to form Castle High School, although the Blue Coat buildings remained in use for the 1989/90 academic year to accommodate the oldest two-year groups who had previously been at Blue Coat. By the time the Blue Coat as a separate school closed its doors for the last time on 14 July 1989, just 334 pupils were on the roll (averaging at 83 or 84 pupils per year group) and the closure was deemed necessary as it was too small for modern secondary school standards and the site was too confined for any substantial expansion; the re-opening of Dudley secondary schools to 11-year-olds in September 1990 would have created further difficulties in accommodating extra pupils at the school.

The doors closed to pupils for the last time in July 1990, when the oldest year group finished their secondary education and the year group below transferred to the main Castle High site for the final year of their secondary education.

In December 1985, Dudley council had considered creating a new school called the Ednam School by a merger between the Dudley School and at least one other smaller secondary school in the town – and the Blue Coat School had been one of the schools mentioned in these plans. However, by the time the 1988/89 academic year began, Blue Coat's future was still uncertain and there was even a suggestion that it could merge with Sir Gilbert Claughton School. However, it was decided in October 1988 that Blue Coat and Dudley School would merge to form a new school to be concentrated at the Dudley School site.

The buildings at Beechwood Road were reused in 1991 as the base of St Thomas's Community Network, which closed in September 2015 and were demolished just over a year later.

The Beechwood Road site has since been replaced with a new housing development called Blue Coat Drive.
