= Halesowen College of Further Education =

Halesowen College
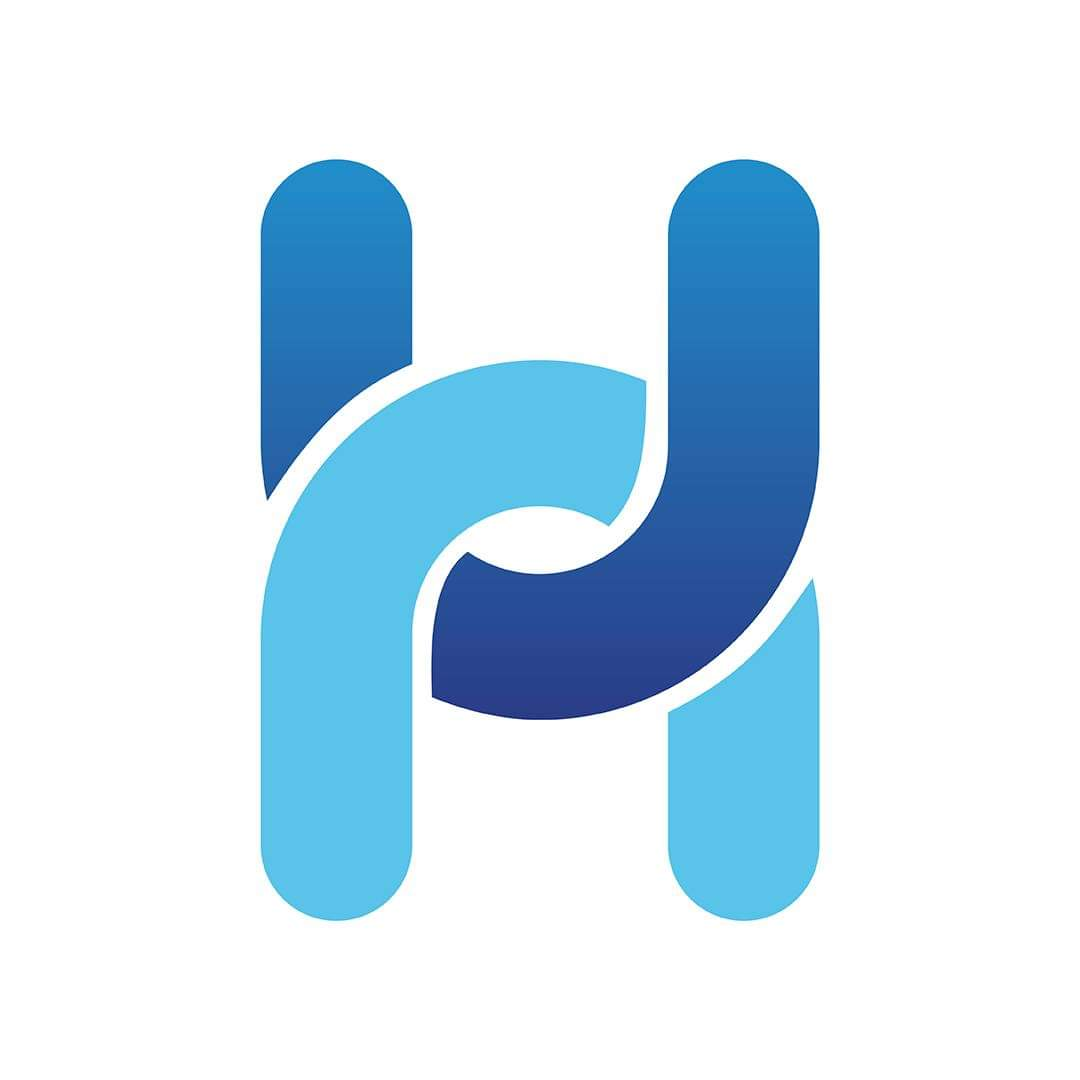

Location
- Whittingham Road; Halesowen, West Midlands, B63 3NA; England
- 52.4564°N 2.0513°W

Information
- Type: Further education
- Local authority: Dudley Metropolitan Borough Council
- Department for Education URN: 130476 Tables
- Ofsted: Reports
- Chair: Jo Chilton
- Principal and Chief Executive: Jacquie Carman
- Gender: Co-educational
- Age: 16+
- Telephone: 0121 602 7777
- Website: Official website

Halesowen College is a further and higher education college in Whittingham Road, Halesowen, West Midlands. It was established in 1982 as a tertiary college. The college also has a Business Centre about a mile away at Coombswood that opened in September 1999.

== History ==
Founded in 1982, it replaced a former small further education college. It was created as a tertiary college following the Metropolitan Borough of Dudley's reorganisation of post-16 studies.

From 1985 to 2003, the Walton Campus (previously Walton Girls School) was part of Halesowen College.

The college was founded in 1966 and on its completion consisted of one large building – which was later designated as Block 0 following the construction of more buildings.

Its current principal is Jacquie Carman.

Four more buildings (Block 1, Block 2, Block 3 and Block 4) were built in 1982 when the college underwent the most significant transformation in its history as part of a reorganisation of education in Halesowen, which saw sixth form facilities withdrawn from secondary schools as well as compulsory education being reorganised to traditional infant, junior and secondary schools from the three-tier system that had been introduced 10 years earlier. This was a landmark change in education in the Dudley borough, sparking a similar reorganisation in the rest of the borough within a decade.

In September 1985, the college further expanded when it took over the former Walton Girls School in Highfield Lane as a campus.

Block 5 was opened in 1997 to accommodate a new library and learning centre. Block 6 (Sports Studies) and Block 7 (ICT and Performing Arts) were opened in late spring of 2003 to replace the facilities at the Walton Campus, which was sold off to make way for a housing estate. The new building was officially opened on 22 September 2003 by Charles Clarke, the education minister.

Halesowen College purchased Shenstone House office block, on Dudley Road, in the summer of 2005 and converted into a Health and Beauty academy.

In 2024 they purchased office blocks at the nearby Trinity Point to service digital technologies and media courses.

== Buildings ==
=== Block 0 ===
This was the original Halesowen College building. It accommodated a refectory, maths and science hub computer suite, science laboratories and an animal care centre. It was built in 1966 but by 2004 there were plans for complete reconstruction of the block. The block was extended to include an admissions centre in the early 1980s but refurbishment in 2003 saw this area converted into a computer suite called the Hawne Room. Students based here studied many different subjects, from Animal Care and Separate sciences to Applied science courses such as forensics and medicine.

Part of the building was demolished in 2008 to make way for a new building which forms the first phase of a complete replacement of Block 0; it was completed in the summer of 2009 and the phased rebuilding was completed by 2012, leaving no trace of the original 1966 college.

=== Block 1 ===
One of four blocks which were built in the early 1980s. Includes a lecture theatre, staff room, and classrooms for business studies, and the senior management offices.

=== Block 2 ===
The second of four blocks which were built for the 1982 reorganisation. It originally housed the staff centre and, since 2003, the admissions centre, skills centre and an individual needs office. The Catering and Hospitality Department is also situated in this block. This block was renovated in 2019-2020 as the Student Hub incorporated student services, the library, computers and spaces for socialising. The catering department still remains in Block 2.

=== Block 3 ===
The third of four blocks which were built for the 1982 reorganisation. It houses the Art & Design Department and the Earth Science Department.

=== Block 4 ===
The last of the four blocks which were added for the 1982 reorganisation. This was renovated in 2020 and now houses the 'Business Hub' and is where the teaching of business, maths and English takes place.

=== Block 5 ===
It opened in September 1997, and includes multi-purpose classrooms. The library and learning centre covered most of the upstairs of the building until it was reduced in size in 2003 following the opening of several learning centres across the college, to make was for the Humanities department. As of 2020, this block is currently being refurbished with plans for its reopening later this year.

=== Block 6 ===
Opened in the late spring of 2003. It houses the Sports Studies Department and a sports hall which is also used for examinations.

=== Block 7 ===
Opened in September 2003. Houses Media, Music and Performing Arts Departments. (It also housed ICT until 2011 when block 9 was constructed.)

=== Block 8 ===
Opened in September 2009. Houses Health and Social Care Faculty. In September 2013, a new kitchen was added specializing in the Bakery course, which was used until the end of the academic year of 2018.

=== Block 9 ===
Opened in September 2011. Houses Computing, ICT, Science and Animal care. ICT and Computing moved here from Block 7.

=== Block 10 ===
Opened in September 2013, marking the completion of a phased five-year redevelopment of the oldest college buildings. Travel and Tourism and an Active Learning Centre are based in this block.

=== Block 11 ===
Completed in 2014 this is home to higher education and Starbucks. The downstairs is currently being used as office space for the redevelopment of blocks 2, 4 and 5.

=== Block 12 ===
A new sports centre was completed in 2015.

=== Block 13 ===
New Performing Arts Centre completed in 2016.

=== Coombswood Science & Technology Centre ===
Constructed in 1999. It provides learning facilities for students studying towards Higher National Diploma, Higher National Certificate and NVQ courses as well as providing facilities for Media students and evening classes for mature students. This was updated in 2015 as part of a £3 million renovation.

=== Shenstone House ===
Purchased in 2005, the former offices was turned into classrooms. Housing the hair and beauty salons and childcare students. It's the second largest of the three campuses, situated close to Halesowen town centre on the Shenstone island. In July 2018, celebrity hairstylist Lee Stafford announced his partnership with the college, titled Lee Stafford Hairdressing Academy. Stafford and his stylists will be training level 2 and 3 students.

=== Trinity Point ===
In 2024 the college purchased and renovated the east wing of the local Trinity Point office blocks to house the digital technologies and media courses operated at the college.

=== Walton Campus (defunct) ===
The former Walton Girls School became part of Halesowen College on its closure in 1985. It housed departments including ICT and Animal Care. Some of the facilities were replaced by the Coombswood E Business Centre in 1999 and the campus was finally closed in 2003 following the completion of Block 6 and Block 7 at the main Whittingham Road Campus. The Walton Campus was demolished in the autumn of 2003 and is now the site of a private housing estate built by Barratt Homes.

== Notable students and staff ==
- Frank Skinner, comedian, taught at Halesowen College during the late 1980s.
- Pop Will Eat Itself bassist Richard March, who was also in Bentley Rhythm Ace, was a staff member at the college.
- Bass player Alex Griffin from Ned's Atomic Dustbin was a staff member at the college.
- Birmingham's former poet laureate Roshan Doug teaches English at the college.
- David Allen Green, lawyer and legal writer, was a student at the college.
- David M. Berry, Professor and writer, was a student at the college.
- Members of Jaws studied at the college until 2013, having formed the band in 2012 during their Music Technology course.
