= Kates Hill =

Residential area in Dudley, West Midlands, England

Coordinates: 52.508°N 2.074°W

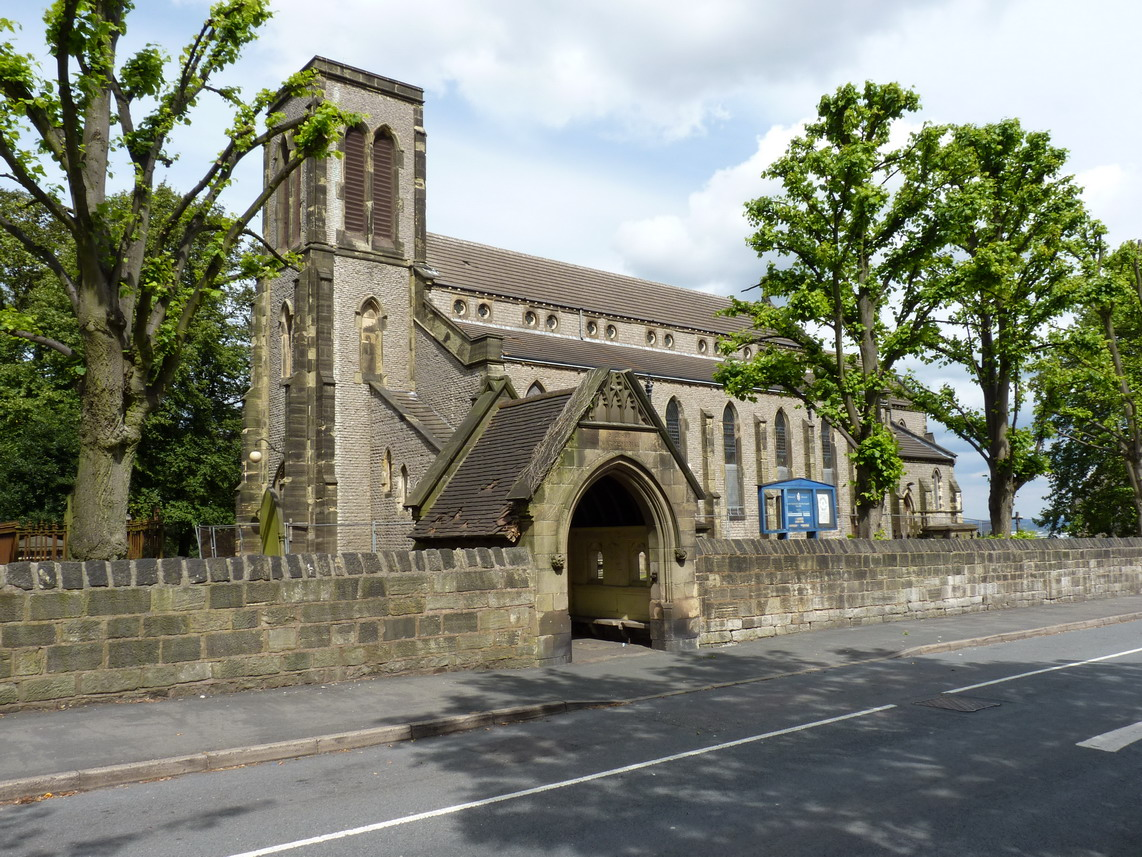
- St John's Church

- Location within the West Midlands
- Metropolitan borough: Dudley
- Metropolitan county: West Midlands
- Region: West Midlands
- Country: England
- Sovereign state: United Kingdom
- Police: West Midlands
- Fire: West Midlands
- Ambulance: West Midlands

Kates Hill, or Kate's Hill, is a residential area in Dudley, West Midlands, England.

== History ==
Kates Hill was the scene of chaos in 1648 when parliamentarians used it as their base in the Civil War against King Charles I. As a result, many roads in the area are named in honour of parliamentary figures from that era and afterwards; these include Oliver Cromwell (Oliver Close and Cromwell Street) and Robert Peel (Peel Street).

It is believed that from around the land of what is now Cromwell Street, parliamentary leader Oliver Cromwell fired his cannons at the royalist garrison that was Dudley's Norman Castle.

Kates Hill was not developed as a residential area until around the 1830s, when houses were built and occupied for people moving to Dudley to work in the fast-growing number of factories and coal pits that were emerging nearby. In 1840, St John's Parish Church was opened and an adjoining church school was built soon afterwards to serve the growing community. Kates Hill Council School was later built in Peel Street.

Despite hundreds of houses being built around St John's Church during the 19th century and at the beginning of the 20th century, as recently as World War I, Kates Hill and neighbouring Oakham was surrounded by a substantial amount of fields. There is still standing a historic grade II listed farm house, dating from the 17th century, at the top of Watsons Green Road; it is now a residential property as its farmland had disappeared by 1930.

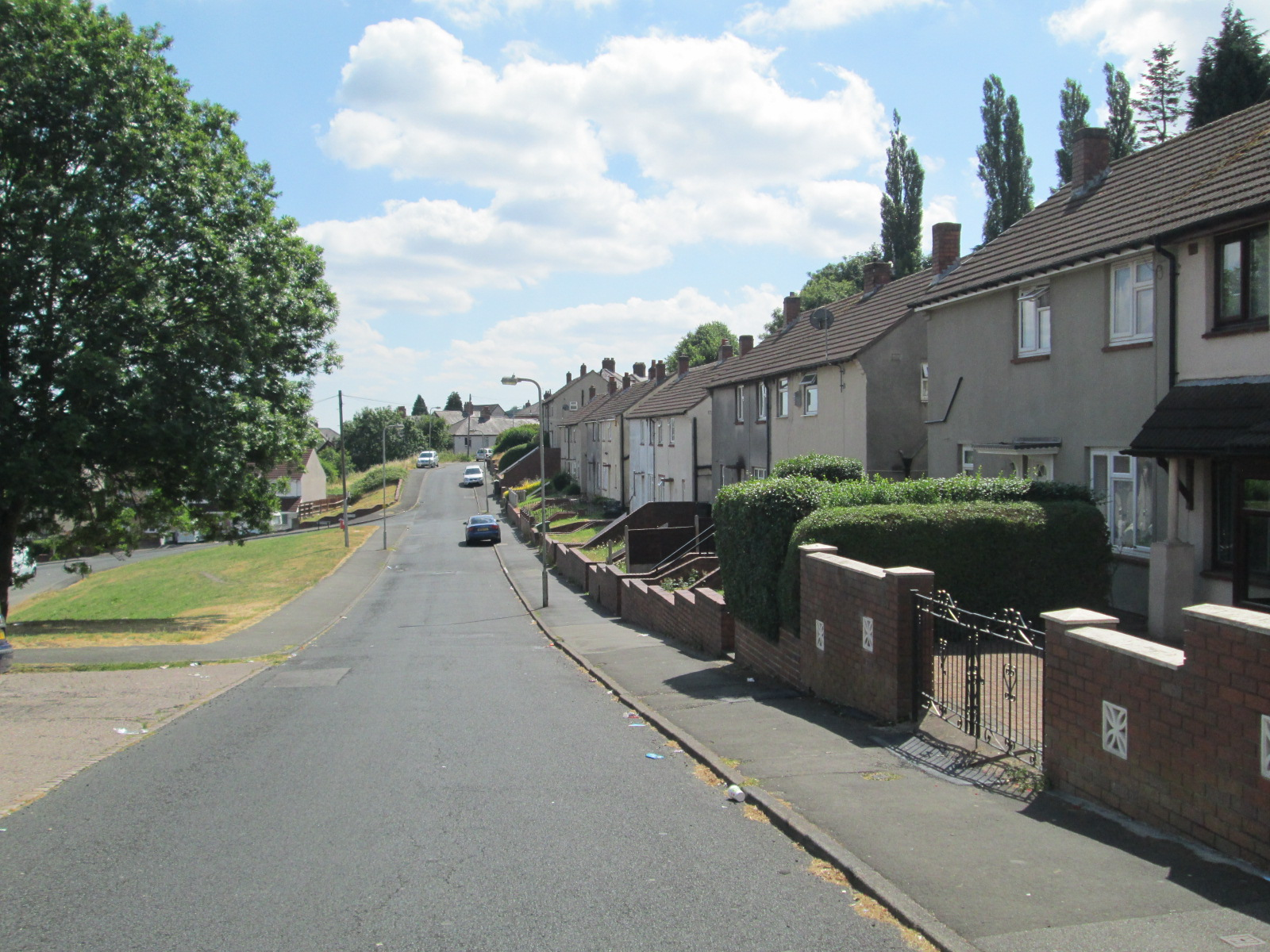
High View Street, Kates Hill

This largely rural scene disappeared after 1915, when council houses were built around Watson's Green Road and Bunns Lane. These included the very first council houses to be built in Dudley, built on the Brewery Fields Estate, land which was purchased by the council in 1915 and which was completed by 1918 consisting of more than 300 houses. Most of the roads on this development were named after prominent British historical figures of the Great War; these include Kitchener Road (Herbert Kitchener), Cavell Road (Edith Cavell) and Haig Road (Douglas Haig).

More houses were built in Watson's Green Road, Bridgewater Crescent and on the eastern side of Bunns Lane in the mid 1920s.

Wolverton Road and the western section of Corporation Road were added at the beginning of the 1930s, and the Rosland estate which includes Green Park Road and Lupin Road was added in the late 1930s. The area around Wolverton Road and Bunns Lane was developed with council housing at the start of the 1930s, along with Rosland Secondary Modern School, opened in 1932 in Beechwood Road.

Some of the oldest houses on Kates Hill were demolished in the late 1930s, and by 1978 almost all of the 19th century houses in the area to the east of St John's Road had been demolished.

St Edmund’s Church of England School relocated to Hillcrest Road from Castle Hill during the early 1970s, being built on the site of several blocks of council flats. St Joseph’s Roman Catholic Primary School also relocated a site formerly occupied by council flats around this time, from its previous location off Trindle Road.

St John’s School closed in the early 1980s when it merged with St Edmund’s, but the building was retained for business and community use.

Rosland Secondary Modern School closed around 1970, but the buildings were retained and occupied by the Blue Coat School, based in Bean Road, and by 1981 the Blue Coat School was fully based at Beechwood Road. However, the Blue Coat School closed in 1989 when it merged with the Dudley School to form Castle High, with the buildings remaining in use for a further year for the oldest two year groups of former Blue Coat pupils. St Thomas’s Community Network then moved into the buildings from a temporary site in Haig Road, being based there for more than 20 years afterwards. The school buildings in Beechwood Road were finally demolished in 2016 and redeveloped as a private housing development called Blue Coat Drive.

Brewery Field Infant School opened in a wooden building at the junction of Corporation Road around 1930, also serving as a base for American soldiers during World War II. The buildings were demolished around 1970 and two-storey council flats later built on the site.

The Rosland Estate was expanded in the late 1970s when several houses, along with warden-controlled bungalows and flats for elderly residents, were built in Iris Close. In the early 1980s, similar bungalows and houses were built between St John's Road and Peel Street.

Many of the newer properties on Kates Hill - notably blocks of four flats with two houses adjoining, with garages underneath the flats - are unique to the area, having been designed by an architect who received an award for designing the area's new homes which were built in 1976/77. They were built around the Peel Street area of Kates Hill, and a network of alleyways runs among the flats. This was initially popular with the estate's first tenants, as planners hoped to re-create the old-fashioned sense of community that had existed on Kates Hill during the 19th century and earlier in the 20th century. But this proved to be unsuccessful as the network of alleyways became a popular target for drug addicts, vandals and muggers. They also provided a popular illegal shortcut for motorcyclists and a dumping ground for stolen cars.

Since the 1950s, Kates Hill has been largely populated by Commonwealth immigrants, mainly Pakistani Muslims. Racial tension in the area culminated in a series of disturbances in September 1991 when white and Asian youths clashed in the area. These disturbances happened at around the same time as the widely reported riots in Cardiff, Oxford and Tyneside, but were not as serious or widely reported.

The original Kates Hill Council School on Peel Street was built during the second half of the 19th century when the residential area was first being developed. Part of the school was damaged by fire on 24 June 1969; shortly afterwards plans for a new school nearby were unveiled, and the new Kates Hill Primary School was completed during 1972, being officially opened on 2 May 1973 by Alderman Morris, Mayor of Dudley. The new school included a nursery unit and covered the 3–12 age range until July 1990, after which it was redesignated as a 3–11 school following the reduction of the secondary transfer age.

Kates Hill has changed dramatically since the early 20th century, yet still retains many pre-1900 buildings; these include St John's Church and St John's School (though now in use as offices), as well as many late 19th-century houses situated around St John's Road. A few of the area's newer buildings have also been demolished. The Freebodies public house, built in St John's Road in the late 1970s to replace a Victorian building, was demolished in 2014 after standing empty for several years, and has since been replaced with housing.

Several 1930s council houses in Cypress Road were demolished in the 1970s due to mining subsidence; council flats and bungalows were later built on the site.

The Rose public house in Lupin Road closed in 1996 after 58 years and was divided into flats. The last public house on Kate’s Hill, the Ivy House, closed in 2020 after more than a century of trading, although the building has survived.

An independent small press, The Kates Hill Press, was established in the area in 1992 and continues to function in Dudley.

== St John's Church ==
St John's Church was Grade II listed by English Heritage on 21 May 2009. following an application made by St John's Church Preservation Group.

The graveyard houses the famous Tipton Slasher, and internationally known education leader and artist Marion Richardson. Also the Hansons family (Hansons Beer).

== See also ==
- Gornal
- Wrens Nest Estate
- Russells Hall Estate
- Kingswinford

== Other sources ==
- Black Country Bugle (2 June 2005)
