= St James Academy, Dudley =

St James Academy

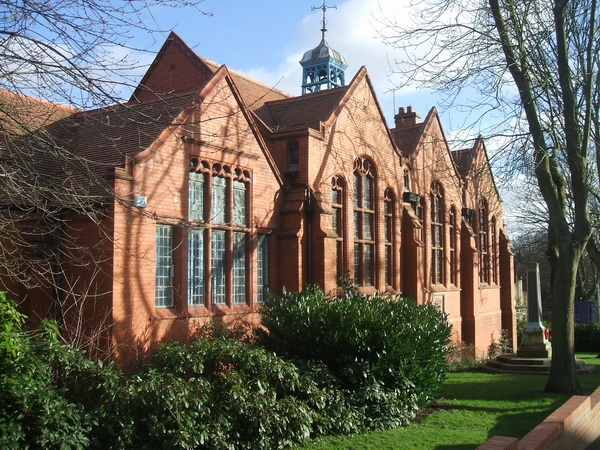
- Some of the school buildings, as seen from St James's Road

Location
- Dudley HighStreet; Dudley, West Midlands, DY1 3JE; England; 52.512°N 2.090°W

Information
- Type: Academy
- Established: 2017; 9 years ago
- Local authority: Dudley
- Trust: Dudley Academies Trust
- Department for Education URN: 144657 Tables
- Ofsted: Reports
- Principal: Ian Moore
- Gender: Mixed
- Age: 11 to 16
- Website: www.stjamesacademy.org.uk

St James Academy is a secondary school located in Dudley, West Midlands, England for pupils 11 to 16 years. It is also a specialist Arts College.

The academy was formed in 2017 from Castle High School as part of the Dudley Academies Trust, in association with Dudley College. The new name was officially adopted in September 2018.

== History ==
The St James Academy is situated on St James's Road, near Dudley town centre, within the buildings of the former Dudley Grammar School (which dated back to 1897; the school was originally established at a different site in 1562).

The grammar school was merged with neighbouring Dudley Girls High School and the Park Secondary Modern Boys and Girls Schools in September 1975 to become the Dudley School, a mixed 12-18 comprehensive school. By December 1985, plans were being made for the Dudley School to merge with at least one other local secondary school, and this finally happened in September 1989 when the school merged with The Blue Coat School to become Castle High School. The Castle High name was chosen in a poll by pupils, who also chose the design of the new school's logo. The new school took in some of the younger pupils from the Sir Gilbert Claughton School, which was being gradually closed down at the time.

After a year, the school opened to 11 year-olds following the local authority's decision to reduce the primary school leaving age; at the same time, its sixth form centre was closed and the leaving age for pupils fell to 16. The former sixth form facilities were used as classrooms to accommodate the new younger pupils. September 1990 also saw the school take in approximately 50% of pupils from Mons Hill School, which closed due to falling pupil numbers. Several teachers from this school were also recruited.

For the first year of its existence as Castle High, the school incorporated the former Blue Coat School buildings on Kates Hill, where the final two academic year groups of that school's pupils remained. The Sir Gilbert Claughton School, however, remained a separate school for its final year as the oldest group of pupils completed their education, while younger pupils were transferred to Castle High and the Holly Hall School.

A new three-storey classroom block was opened in the 1991 summer term on the St James's Road site, the first in several phases of expansion which were completed in 1995. The expansion also saw the demolition of the school swimming pool, which had been on the Dudley School site. Mobile classrooms were on the site until the permanent buildings were opened. By September 1995, the school was entirely based at the former grammar school site on St James's Road and the former high school site on Priory Road was abandoned.

The expanded school was officially opened on 20 October 1995 by George Carey, Archbishop of Canterbury. The former Girls High School buildings were demolished at the beginning of the following year.

Plans were unveiled in June 2008 for the school to receive academy status, sponsored by the Oasis Community Learning Trust, though these plans failed to materialize and were scrapped in March 2009.

In February 2017, plans to convert the school into an academy were revived, with Castle High School set to join a new multi-academy trust in the north of the borough sponsored by Dudley College, alongside Holly Hall School, Hillcrest School, and High Arcal School. The academy was launched later that year, with the school changing its name in September 2018.

== History time line ==
- December 1985 - Dudley MBC announces plans for a merger of The Dudley School and at least one smaller secondary school to form a new secondary school by the end of the decade. Blue Coat and Gilbert Claughton Schools are believed to be part of the plan for a new school.
- October 1988 - Following three years of speculation, Dudley MBC confirms that the Dudley School will merge with The Blue Coat School with effect from September next year. The plans are part of a major reorganisation of schools in the borough which are also expected to see two secondary school closures within the next two years, along with the secondary transfer age being reduced from 12 to 11. The reorganisation of the school will also see the end of its sixth form largely due to its falling popularity; there will be no intake of new sixth formers for the 1989/90 academic year, although the current lower sixth will be able to complete their A-level studies at the school.
- April 1989 - It is confirmed that the new school will be called Castle High, a name chosen by the Dudley School and Blue Coat School pupils.
- September 1989 - Castle High School opens on a merger of The Dudley School and The Blue Coat School, making use of the Dudley School buildings but with the oldest two year groups of Blue Coat pupils remaining at the Blue Coat site for a year. Some of the former Sir Gilbert Claughton School pupils also join the school.
- July 1990 - Castle High's sixth form centre closes.
- September 1990 - the school's starting age is reduced from 12 to 11 in accordance with a borough-wide reduction in the transition age between primary and secondary school. Also starting the school are some former pupils of the closed Mons Hill School, which also supplies Castle High with some of its former staff. Construction of a new classroom block is incomplete, meaning that pupils will be taught in mobile classrooms for some lessons in the meantime. Castle High is now a single-site school within the old Dudley School buildings following the closure of the Blue Coat annex.
- June 1991 - new classrooms are opened as part of an extension to the St James's Road site.
- September 1995 - the final extensions to the St James's Road site are completed, meaning that the Priory Road site is now redundant.
- October 1995 - the expanded Castle High School is officially opened.
- January 1996 - the former Dudley Girls High School buildings, which until recently were part of Castle High, are demolished and the site re-used as a public car park.
- May 1999 - Harold Hyde, former deptuty head who first joined the school as a class teacher in the 1960s and remained there until his retirement in July 1992, dies of a brain tumour aged 61.
- February 2001 - 12-year-old pupil Scott Holloway dies after being knocked down by a van near his home on the Priory Estate. Staff and pupils at Castle High set up a fund in Scott's memory and a total of almost £1,100 was raised, some from bidding for a signed Aston Villa football. A local van driver later received a fine and a driving ban for careless driving in connection to Scott's death..
- June 2008 - Plans are unveiled for Castle High School to become an academy sponsored by the Oasis Community Learning Trust.
- March 2009 - Plans for the academy to be developed are scrapped.
- February 2017 - New academization plans are unveiled, with sponsorship from Dudley College.
- July 2018 - the school featured in news headlines nationally after banning a 14-year-old male pupil from appearing in drag at the school talent show. The boy later staged his show at a men's club, receiving a positive response.
- September 2018 - Castle High becomes St James Academy.

== See also ==
- Dormston School
