= Wall Heath =

Coordinates: 52.506°N 2.181°W

- Location within the West Midlands
- Metropolitan borough: Dudley
- Metropolitan county: West Midlands
- Region: West Midlands
- Country: England
- Sovereign state: United Kingdom
- Post town: KINGSWINFORD
- Postcode district: DY6
- Dialling code: 01384
- Police: West Midlands
- Fire: West Midlands
- Ambulance: West Midlands
- UK Parliament: Dudley South

Wall Heath is a suburban village in the Dudley Metropolitan Borough in the West Midlands of England. It is located on the A449 road, approximately 1.5 miles northwest of Kingswinford (of which it is considered a suburb), 5 miles west of Dudley Town Centre and 9 miles north of Kidderminster. It forms part of the West Midlands-South Staffordshire border.

== Geography ==
Wall Heath is situated on the edge of the West Midlands conurbation, bordering Staffordshire to the west.

It was formerly a part of the Kingswinford Rural District until its merger with the Brierley Hill Urban District in 1934. Since 1966 it has been a part of the Dudley County Borough, now the metropolitan borough.

Wall heath also falls under the Kingswinford North and Wall Heath Ward with a population of 12,561 as of the 2011 Census.

== Closest cities, towns and villages ==
Destinations from Wall Heath

Northwest : Swindon, Bridgnorth, Telford North : Wombourne, Himley, Wolverhampton Northeast : Gornal, Walsall, Sutton Coldfield West : Six Ashes, Bobbington East : Dudley, West Bromwich Southwest : Kidderminster, Stourton, Kinver, Enville South : Kingswinford, Wordsley, Stourbridge Southeast : Brierley Hill, Birmingham

== Village services ==
The village contains numerous outlets providing varied services; including a Co-op supermarket, Boots Local Pharmacy, a podiatrist and a private dental surgery. There are three public houses, two Indian restaurants, two Chinese take-aways, a Chinese restaurant, a pizza delivery/take-away, a Fish & Chip Shop, a cafe and a catering company. Nearby Stallings Lane is home to a branch of Lidl and Morrisons, the latter originally opening as Safeway in 1979, as well as a small parade of local shops. There was, until recently, a small public library, which was closed by Dudley Metropolitan Borough Council for economic reasons. The local authority states that the money from the closure of Wall Heath Library and four other Dudley libraries will be used for a £2.3 million scheme to update services in the borough. The nearest Library is the Kingswinford Library. The other libraries in the borough which fell victim of the council policy were Quarry Bank, Amblecote, Dudley Wood and Woodside.

There are two allotments in the village and three public parks located in the village. One is accessible from Albion Street and two are accessible from High Street.

Located in Wall Heath is Holbeche House, which is where the flight of the gunpowder plotters ended. The building is now a private care home for the elderly although it is currently closed. There is also a Dudley MBC shelter, The Gables, located in the village.

The Wall Heath Community centre regularly hosts National Blood Service blood donation sessions. There are many events held here such as charity events and local classes for all ages including a nursery and yoga classes. There are also frequent displays showcasing old photographs of Wall Heath and the local area. The Wall Heath Horticultural Society also hold their meetingsat the centre on the first Tuesday in the month. You can find more details on their web site. http://wallheathhorticulturalguild.blogspot.co.uk/ Wall Heath Community Centre's playing fields are home to Phoenix Youth. Tennis courts are also situated on the site.

In the last century, Wall Heath was the home of the Sant family (Maidensbridge Road). Herbert Sant won an MC during the First World War. His brother William became a famed artist whose work is displayed at the Tate Gallery in London and other notable locations. Ancestor Steven Sant born in nearby Dudley is a renowned writer on football and local politics.

Wall Heath is served by bus routes 15, 16 and 17/17a which serve, Wombourne, Wolverhampton, Stourbridge, Dudley or the Merry Hill Centre. Less frequent is service 57 between Stourbridge and Wall Heath. From 19th July 2026 service 57 will be partly replaced by service 226A which will run Mon-Fri only. Services 15 and 16 are operated by National Express West Midlands, the rest by Diamond Bus.

== Sport ==
The village has produced three professional cricketers; John (Jack) Alfred Flavell, Paul Pridgeon and Stuart Lampitt. All played for Worcestershire CCC, with Jack Flavell playing for the England national team.

The village is home to Dudley Kingswinford Rugby Football Club (DKRFC), who after 2 promotions from the Midland League are currently playing in the National league 2 North. On the outskirts of the village is 'Eagle Park', home to Kewford Eagles Football Club.

== Churches ==
There are three churches in the village. These are the Church of the Ascension, the smaller St Andrew's United Reformed Church and Wall Heath Evangelical Free Church. The Church of the Ascension sits at the centre of the village opposite the school of the same name, Church of the Ascension Primary School (CofE).

== Education ==
The village is supported by two primary schools; Maidensbridge Primary School and Church of the Ascension CofE Primary School. Maidensbridge Primary School has hosted the Helen Taylor School of Dance for 20 years, who perform annually at the Wolverhampton Grand Theatre. On completion of primary education, typically the pupils from both schools continue their education at Kingswinford Academy, in nearby Kingswinford or alternatively, Summerhill School, also in Kingswinford.

Maidensbridge Primary School was saved from closure in 2005 due to campaigning by local residents.

== Politics ==
The village is part of the Kingswinford North and Wall Heath ward of the Dudley Metropolitan Borough. It is represented by three seats on the Borough council. Currently these are occupied by two Conservative and one Labour councillor.

The village falls within the Dudley South constituency of the UK parliament. The current MP is Mike Wood (Conservative Party (UK)). However, due to boundary changes, the village will be part of the new Kingswinford & South Staffordshire constituency for the next General Election.
