= Buckpool and Fens Pool Local Nature Reserve =

Local nature reserve in Pensnett, England, United Kingdom

Buckpool and Fens Pool
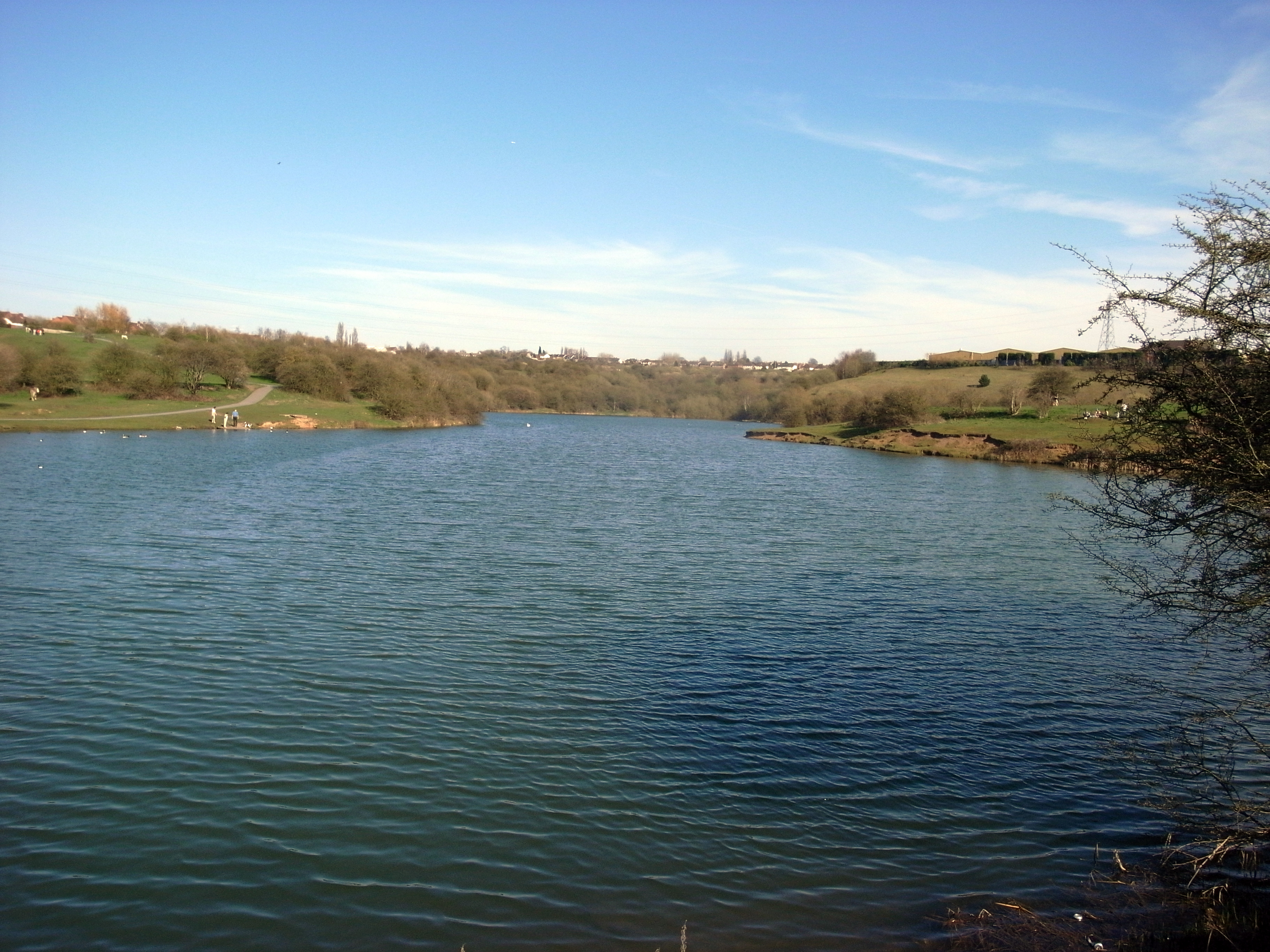
- Middle Pool - one of the large pools inside the local nature reserve
- Interactive map of Buckpool and Fens Pool
- Type: Local Nature Reserve
- Location: Pensnett, England
- Coordinates: 52.492°N 2.130°W
- Created: 1993
- Operator: Dudley Metropolitan Borough Council

Buckpool and Fens Pool Local Nature Reserve is situated in the Pensnett area of the West Midlands. The largest area of open water in Dudley Metropolitan Borough, it contains both large and small ponds, one end of the Stourbridge Canal, streams and grassy areas. It was created in 1993.

== History ==
The area was once part of Pensnett Chase, a medieval hunting ground of the Barons of Dudley. Like most of the rest of the chase, it was gradually turned to industrial use, including coal mining, clay extraction and a brickworks. Part of the Earl of Dudley's private railways ran across the area. The collieries and clay pits closed in the early 20th century but the brickworks and railway only closed in the 1960s. The former colliery waste ground has now become grassland and former clay pits have flooded to become ponds. It now comprises the largest area of open water in Dudley Metropolitan Borough. The area was declared a nature reserve in 1993.

== Location ==
The reserve is located in the Pensnett area of the West Midlands. Access is via the Pensnett Road.

== Landscape ==
The reserve contains 4 large irregularly shaped pools. Three of these pools: Fens Pool, Middle Pool and Grove Pool are grouped together in the north eastern part of the reserve. These pools form the Fens Pools site of Special Scientific Interest. The other large pool in the reserve, Foot's Hole, lies to the south west of this group, separated by the Dell Stadium (a sports ground owned by Dudley Council). The longest pool, Middle Pool, is around 400m in length. There are also numerous small ponds as well as grassland and some scrubland.

Although the area was the scene of intensive industrial use, the remains of a ridge and furrow agricultural system can still be seen in part of the reserve.

== See also ==
- Barrow Hill Local Nature Reserve
