= Pegasus Academy =

Location
- Scotts Green Close; Holly Hall, Dudley, West Midlands, DY1 2DU; England; 52.5038°N 2.1073°W

Information
- Type: Academy
- Established: 2018 (As an academy)
- Local authority: Dudley
- Department for Education URN: 137390 Tables
- Ofsted: Reports
- Principal: Andy Landers
- Gender: Mixed
- Age: 11 to 16
- Capacity: 730
- Telephone: 01384 253722
- Website: www.pegasusacademy.org.uk

Pegasus Academy (formerly known as Holly Hall School and Holly Hall Maths and Computing College) is a mixed secondary school located in the Holly Hall area of Dudley, West Midlands, England. Situated by the Scotts Green roundabout near the Russells Hall Estate, it was originally opened in 1968 to replace an earlier, smaller building several hundred yards further along the road towards Brierley Hill.

It was originally a secondary modern school until adopting comprehensive status in September 1975, three years after the entry age was increased from 11 to 12. The school reverted to being an 11-16 comprehensive in September 1991. The school had grant-maintained status in the 1990s, before receiving Mathematics and Computing College specialist status in September 2002.

In December 2007, plans were unveiled by Dudley council for the school to be rebuilt and change to academy status, which would have made it the first school of its kind in the borough. The plan also included taking in some pupils from Pensnett High School, which was earmarked for closure with other pupils also transferring to The Crestwood School at Kingswinford. However, these plans were scrapped by the local council in March 2008 as the school was deemed "too successful" for academy status. However the school was converted to academy status in 2011.

In September 2017 the academy joined The Dudley Academies Trust, under the sponsorship of Dudley College. It was renamed the Pegasus Academy the following September.
