= Brierley Hill (disambiguation) =

Brierley Hill can refer to the following:

- Brierley Hill, a town in England
- Brierley Hill (UK Parliament constituency), a former constituency
- Brierley Hill Urban District, a former administrative municipality in England
- Brierley Hill (1872 HBC vessel), a vessel utilised by the Hudson's Bay Company
