= Holly Hall =

Holly Hall may refer to:

- Holly Hall, Dudley, a residential area of Dudley, West Midlands, England
  - Holly Hall Academy
- Holly Hall (Elkton, Maryland), a historic home in Elkton, Maryland, United States
