= Pensnett High School =

Location
- Tiled House Lane; Pensnett, Brierley Hill, West Midlands, DY5 4LN; England; 52°29′40″N 2°08′21″W

Information
- Established: 1932
- Closed: 2012
- Local authority: Dudley
- Department for Education URN: 103864 Tables
- Ofsted: Reports
- Gender: Coeducational
- Age: 14 to 16
- Enrolment: 150
- Website: http://www.pensnett.dudley.gov.uk

Pensnett High School was a secondary school located in the Pensnett area of the Dudley Metropolitan Borough, in the West Midlands of England. There were around 150 pupils aged 14–16 on the school roll before closure.

== History ==
Originally known as the Pensnett Secondary Modern School, it was opened in 1932 for pupils aged 11 years and above in the expanding Pensnett area of the Brierley Hill district. Several modern extensions and improvements were added to the original school building over the years.

Eric Hancock was the Headmaster of Pensnett Secondary Modern School from 1956 until his retirement in 1972. Hancock had purchased the old organ from nearby St Mark's Church in Brierley Hill, for use by the school orchestra. He also made school uniform and homework compulsory, and was one of the first head teachers at secondary modern schools in the area to give pupils the chance to study O Levels. Eric Hancock died in December 1986 at the age of 79.

The retirement of Mr Hancock in 1972 coincided with the redesignation of the school as a 12–16 school in September of that year. September 1975 saw the school follow suit of all other secondary modern and grammar schools in Dudley (which Brierley Hill district became part of in 1966) by converting to comprehensive status. It retained comprehensive status until closure; however, the age range was reverted to 11–16 in September 1990.

In July 2001, in response to a written question by Peter Ainsworth MP to the Secretary of State for Culture, Media and Sport, Tessa Jowell, included Pensnett School of Technology in a list of those schools which have benefited from the work of school sports coordinators.

In September 2007, the school underwent a name change from Pensnett School of Technology to Pensnett High School.

Plans were unveiled in December 2007 to merge the school by September 2010 with The Crestwood School, in nearby Kingswinford, and to create a new Academy. However, these plans were scrapped in March 2009 by Dudley Council owing to financial technicalities.

Three arson attacks at the school in spring 2010 caused hundreds of thousands of pounds' worth of damage.

== Academic standards ==
The school received a somewhat poor Ofsted report in June 2006, which graded the school on point 4, "Unsatisfactory", on a 4-point scale.

Following a re-inspection in July 2007, Ofsted graded the school on point 3, "Satisfactory", and said: "Pensnett is a satisfactory and improving school. It has made good progress since its last inspection and its reputation is getting better."

The 2010 GCSE A*–C (including Maths and English) results represented a 63% improvement on the previous year.

== Facilities ==
New technology classrooms were added in the early 1990s, with the new department being officially opened in 1993.

The School successfully experimented with playing music during lessons and found that music can aid learning and improve behaviour.

In April 2007, Wolverhampton Wanderers player Craig Davies opened a £1.3 million community sports hall that was for use by residents, sports groups and clubs during non-school hours.

== Notable former staff ==
- Sir Geoff Hampton, now a professor at the University of Wolverhampton.

== Closure ==
Dudley Council soon afterwards announced plans to close the school at the end of the 2009–2010 academic year. Despite widespread opposition by pupils, staff, parents and members of the local community, the decision to close the school was made on 29 December 2009 with effect from July 2010. However, it remained open for two years as a learning centre for the oldest two year groups in the school, before completely closing in July 2012, bringing an end to 80 years of education at the site.

Just after the decision to close the school was confirmed, it was revealed that Pensnett High had once again been the lowest ranking school in the borough for pupils studying for GCSEs being completed in summer 2009. However, the total of pupils gaining 5 GCSEs at grade C or above had improved to 19% from 11% the previous year. A new high of 32% was attained in 2010.

After laying empty for four years, in October 2014, Dudley Council announced that the former school site would be redeveloped into a centre for young people with learning disabilities. Some buildings on the site were to be demolished, but the recently built sports hall was set to be refurbished and have new facilities. As of 2024, much of the site remains unbuilt on.
