= Nicola Richards =

British politician

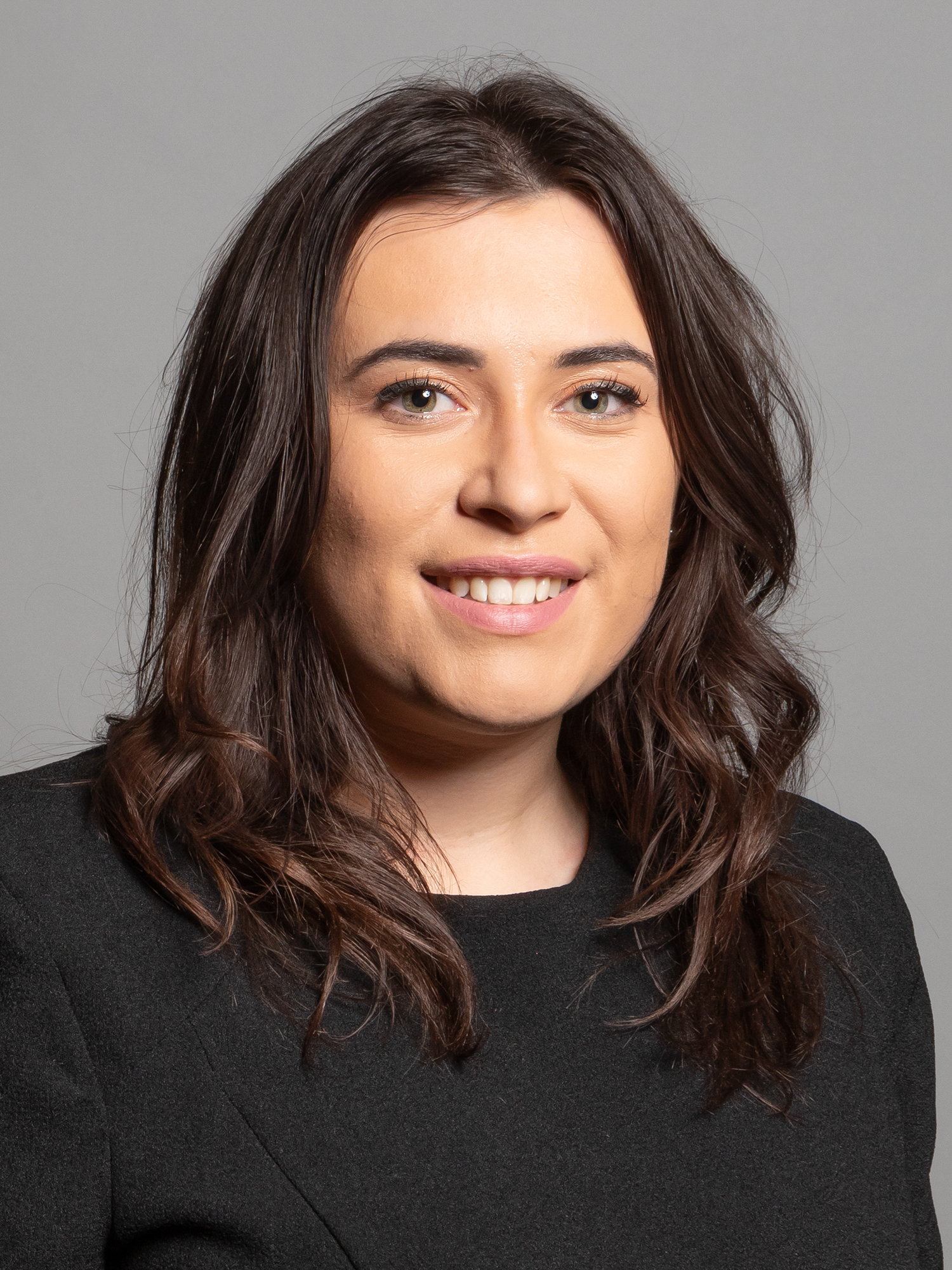
- Official portrait, 2020

Member of Parliament for West Bromwich East
- In office 12 December 2019 – 30 May 2024
- Preceded by: Tom Watson
- Succeeded by: Constituency abolished

Personal details
- Born: Nicola Faye Richards; 19 December 1994 (age 31) Dudley, West Midlands, England
- Party: Conservative
- Spouse: Jon Smith (m. 2022)
- Education: The Kingswinford School; King Edward VI College, Stourbridge; University of Birmingham (BA)

Nicola Faye Richards (born 19 December 1994) is a British politician. She was the Member of Parliament (MP) for West Bromwich East from 2019 to 2024. She is a member of the Conservative Party. Prior to her parliamentary career, Richards was a councillor. Her constituency was abolished at the 2024 general election.

== Early life and career ==
Nicola Richards was born on 19 December 1994 and grew up in Dudley. She attended The Kingswinford School in Kingswinford. and later King Edward VI College, Stourbridge for sixth form. Richards studied politics at the University of Birmingham, graduating with an upper second class degree in 2016. While at university, she was a caseworker for Dudley South MP Chris Kelly, and later for his successor Mike Wood.

After university, Richards worked as a communications officer for Stourbridge MP Margot James. Richards then worked in public relations for the Jewish Leadership Council, and the Holocaust Educational Trust. Before being elected to Parliament, Richards worked for Mayor of the West Midlands Andy Street as a content creator.

Richards was elected as a Conservative councillor for Kingswinford North and Wall Heath on the Dudley Metropolitan Borough Council in 2015, and was re-elected in 2019. She was the chair of the local Young Conservatives group and a vice-chair of the Dudley South Conservative Association. Richards supported Brexit in the 2016 UK EU membership referendum and campaigned with Vote Leave.

== Parliamentary career ==
At the 2019 general election, Richards was elected as MP for West Bromwich East, winning with 46.7% of the vote and a majority of 1,593.

She was a member of the Committee on the Future Relationship with the European Union from March 2020 to January 2021, the Women and Equalities Committee from March 2020 to November 2021 and the Education Select Committee from September 2021 to March 2022.

Richards is a supporter of transgender rights. In August 2020, she co-authored an article in ConservativeHome with fellow MP Alicia Kearns, which called on the government to reform the Gender Recognition Act 2004. She also voiced her support of the expansion of routine testing for HIV in all emergency departments in areas of high prevalence including West Bromwich in 2023. This was rolled out across the Midlands starting in September 2024 with government funding.

She served on the 1922 Committee between November 2020 and September 2021. She was a Parliamentary Private Secretary in the Department of Transport between September 2021 and July 2022. Richards resigned as PPS on 5 July 2022 in protest against Prime Minister Boris Johnson's leadership over his handling of the Chris Pincher scandal.

Richards endorsed Penny Mordaunt during the July 2022 Conservative Party leadership election. After Mordaunt was eliminated, Richards backed Liz Truss. In September 2022, she was appointed as a Parliamentary Private Secretary to Mordaunt when she became the Leader of the House of Commons.

She became co-Chair of the All-Party Parliamentary Group Against Antisemitism in December 2022. As part of this role, she criticised GB News for allowing presenter Neil Oliver to "indulge conspiracy theories" that risk spreading antisemitic tropes in February 2023.

In May 2024, Richards was shortlisted to be the Conservative prospective parliamentary candidate for the new seat of Solihull West and Shirley. Former surgeon and barrister Neil Shastri-Hurst won the selection and went on to be elected as MP in the 2024 general election.

She served as a vice chair of the International Young Democrat Union (IYDU), a global alliance of centre-right political youth organisations between 2021 and 2025.

== Post-parliamentary career ==
Richards became the director of government engagement and head of the Midlands for the communications consultancy Cratus Group in August 2024. She has also been a trustee of the LGBTQ charity Stonewall since July 2026.

== Personal life ==
Richards married Jon Smith at St Mary and St Bartholomew Church, in Hampton in Arden, near Solihull, in December 2022. She was a trustee of the Albion Foundation, the charity arm of the football club West Bromwich Albion between 2020 and 2024.

Parliament of the United Kingdom
Preceded by Tom Watson	Member of Parliament for West Bromwich East; 2019–2024	Constituency abolished
