= Geoff Hampton =

British head teacher

Sir Leslie Geoffrey Hampton (born 1952), best known as Sir Geoff Hampton, is a British head teacher who gained notability in March 1998 when he received a knighthood in recognition for his achievements as head teacher of Northicote School in Wolverhampton, West Midlands. Within five years, he had transformed the fortunes of the first school in Britain which had been deemed by OFSTED inspectors as "failing".

Hampton trained at King Alfred's College in Winchester, Hampshire, and his first teaching post was at Pensnett School in Brierley Hill, West Midlands.

He has since departed from the Northicote School and is now a professor at the University of Wolverhampton.
