= Thorns Collegiate Academy =

Coordinates: 52.4681°N 2.1171°W

Location
- Stockwell Avenue; Brierley Hill, West Midlands, DY5 2NU; England

Information
- Type: Academy
- Trust: Shireland Collegiate Academy Trust
- Department for Education URN: 143818 Tables
- Ofsted: Reports
- Head teacher: Nikki Jones
- Gender: Coeducational
- Age: 11 to 16
- Enrolment: 991
- Website: http://thornsca.org.uk/

Thorns Collegiate Academy is a coeducational secondary school located in Brierley Hill, West Midlands, England.

== Background ==
It serves the southern half of Brierley Hill around Withymoor Village and Quarry Bank. The school is a specialist Arts College. Like most schools in Dudley LEA, it has no sixth form.

The school was opened in September 1977 to replace Quarry Bank Boys School and Quarry Bank Girls School, two schools which had existed on Coppice Lane since the early 1930s. The new school was situated on Stockwell Avenue and now has more than 1,300 pupils aged 11–16 on the roll. In 2002 it became a performing arts college.

The first buildings at the present site were opened in the early 1970s as an annexe to the Quarry Bank school for older pupils. By 1975, almost 20 mobile classrooms had been erected at the new site in Stockwell Avenue as it now accommodated the majority of the school's pupils. A second building was added in 1977 as the Coppice Lane buildings were closed and the school was now located on the same site with a new name.

The buildings on Coppice Lane were demolished soon afterwards and redeveloped for housing; one for council housing, the other for private housing.

Two more classroom blocks were added during the 1980s and the most recent building was opened in 1991, by which time the school had 1,200 pupils following the first intake of 11-year-olds in September 1990 - the starting age for pupils in the local area had increased to 12 in 1972.

It is named after Thorns Road (A4036). Other schools to form the school are the Quarry Bank Senior Girls and Quarry Bank Senior Boys when in Staffordshire on Coppice Lane which became the Quarry Bank Secondary Modern School, and another was the Mill Street Technical College. The site on Coppice Lane closed in 1977.

In September 2008, it became a trust school, part of The Stourbridge Educational Trust (TSET), along with other Stourbridge secondary schools, [Pedmore Technology College], [Redhill School, Stourbridge] and [Ridgewood High School, West Midlands].

On the College site over the past year, Thorns Community Learning Village has been developed, comprising Thorns Primary School, Thorns Community College and a school for students with special needs, which will replace the facilities currently provided by Old Park School.

Thorns community college is a performing arts college. It won the ARTS mark gold twice, and has a dance studio, a drama theatre, a drama club and dance club. It has won awards for its performances in dance, drama and music. Also every year it holds a dance festival.

The English, ICT and Vocational Education block at the school was declared unsafe in September 2010 and the cost of making it safe was estimated at £600,000. 11 mobile classrooms were put into place to replace these buildings until they were remedied or rebuilt.

Previously a foundation school administered by Dudley Metropolitan Borough Council, in September 2017 Thorns Community College converted to academy status and was renamed Thorns Collegiate Academy. The school is now sponsored by the Shireland Collegiate Academy Trust.

== Notable former pupils ==
Famous alumni include the footballer Trevor Smith and footballer Danny Batth, captain of Wolverhampton Wanderers 2017-2018 Championship winning team.
