= Barrow Hill Local Nature Reserve =

Local nature reserve in Pensnett, England, United Kingdom

Barrow Hill
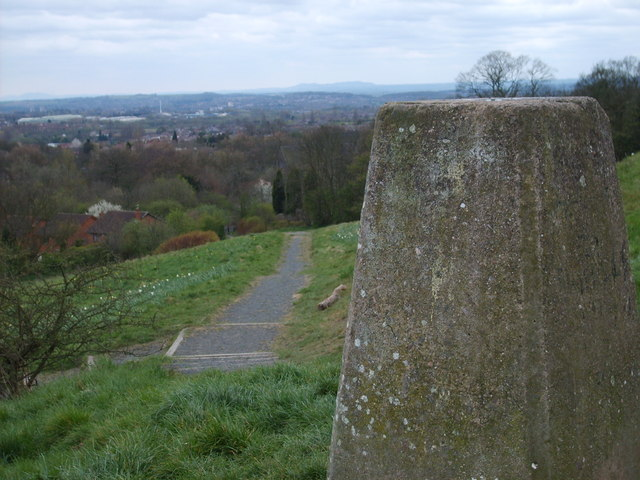
- View from the top of Barrow Hill
- Interactive map of Barrow Hill
- Type: Local Nature Reserve
- Location: Pensnett, West Midlands, England
- Coordinates: 52.506°N 2.126°W
- Area: 27.58 acres (11.16 ha)
- Created: 2005
- Operator: Dudley Metropolitan Borough Council

Barrow Hill Local Nature Reserve is a local nature reserve situated in Pensnett in the county of West Midlands, England. Its most distinctive feature, Barrow Hill, is the eroded remnant of a high level igneous intrusion that was formed 315 million years ago during the Carboniferous period. The reserve was created in 2005.

== History ==
Barrow Hill is the only proven example of surface volcanic activity in the Black Country area. The earliest evidence of human presence at the area were two burial chambers (known as barrows) that were found on the northern side of Barrow Hill. These burial chambers are believed to date back to the Bronze Age of around 2000BC to 700BC.

The area was once woodland inside Pensnett Chase, which was mainly common land under the lordship of the Barons of Dudley. The hard volcanic rock (dolerite) that forms Barrow Hill was quarried in the 19th century for use as road stone. Another reminder of the industrial age in the reserve is a footpath that follows the course of one of the Earl of Dudley's private railways. The reserve was created in 2005.

== Location ==
The reserve is located at Pensnett, near to St Mark's Church and Russells Hall Hospital. Access is via Vicarage Lane, Pensnett.

== Landscape ==
The reserve is dominated by Barrow Hill, the remains of an extinct volcano. The effects of quarrying for dolerite can be clearly seen. The quarrying removed the two barrows (Bronze Age burial mounds) that gave the hill its name. Exposed rock faces in the quarries reveal volcanic features, such as hexagonal pillars that formed during the cooling of the magma.

The summit of Barrow Hill stands at over 150m (500ft) above sea level. A large cross that was commissioned by St Mark's Church now stands at the summit of the hill.

The area contains woodland, such as Barrow Hill Copse, along with meadowland and ponds.

== See also ==
- Buckpool and Fens Pool Local Nature Reserve
