= Hawbush =

Council estate in West Midlands, England

Coordinates: 52.475°N 2.146°W

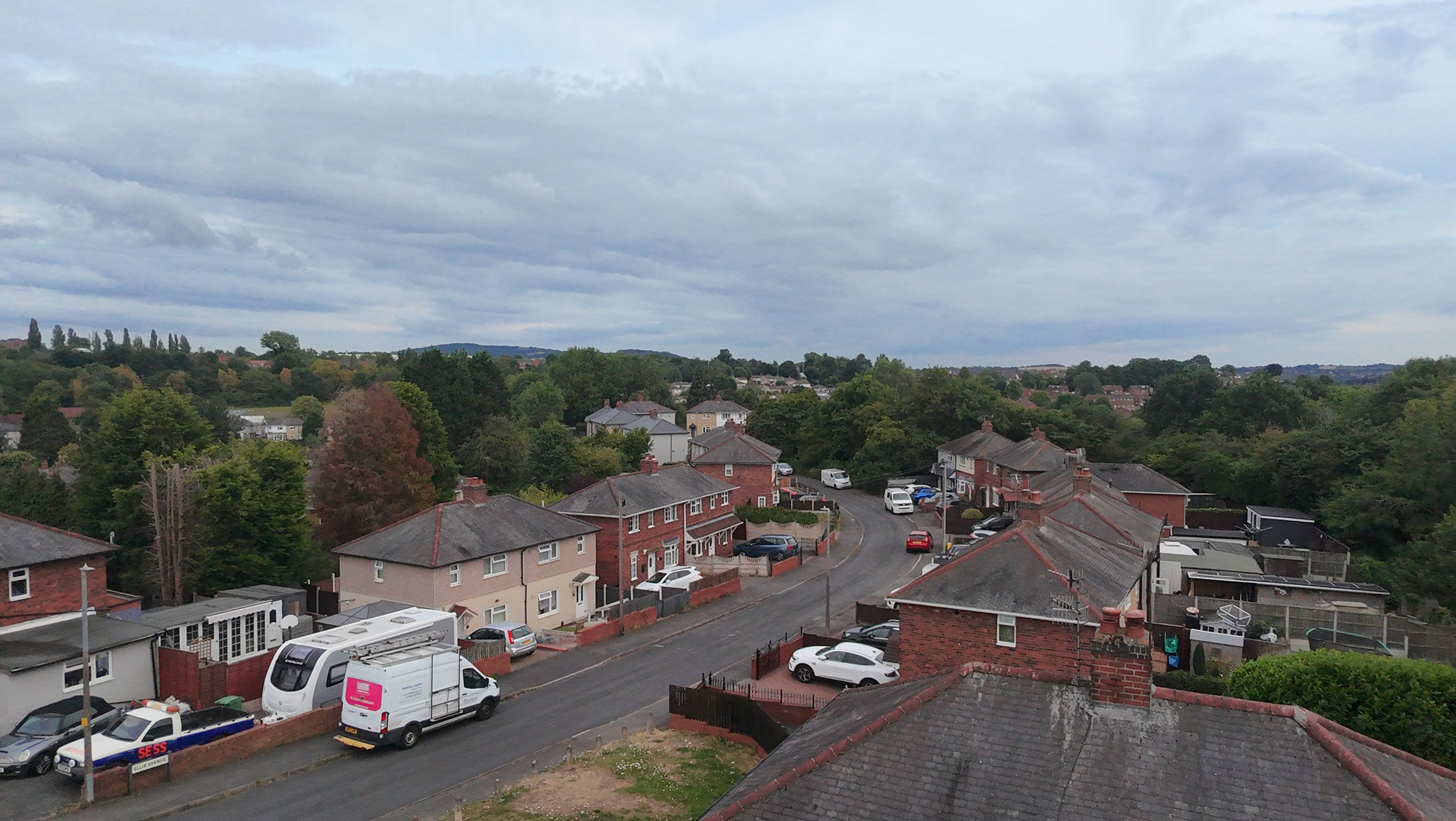
- Drone's Eye View of Hawbush from the Cooper Avenue end of the estate

- Location within the West Midlands
- Population: (2011, ward)
- Metropolitan borough: Dudley
- Metropolitan county: West Midlands
- Region: West Midlands
- Country: England
- Sovereign state: United Kingdom
- Post town: Brierley Hill
- Postcode district: DY5
- Dialling code: 01384
- Police: West Midlands
- Fire: West Midlands
- Ambulance: West Midlands
- UK Parliament: Stourbridge

Hawbush is a council estate in Brierley Hill, West Midlands, England, and is part of the Brierley Hill ward. Formerly part of Staffordshire, it was built in the 1920s and 1930s.

== History ==
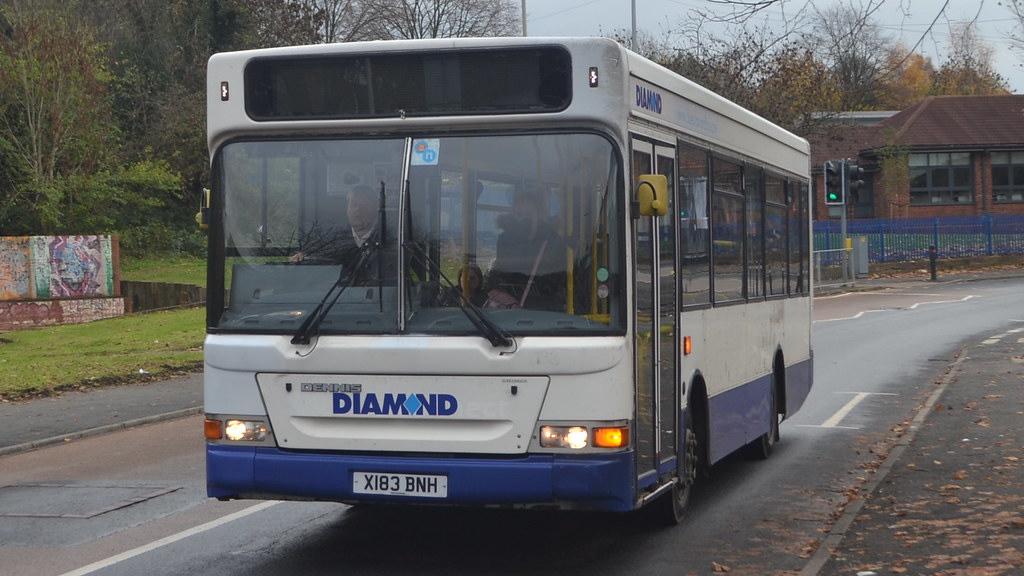
A Diamond Bus on Hawbush Road with the Northern entry to Hawbush School in the background

The housing on the Hawbush estate is formed of the Swan Lane estate, built between the 1920s and 1950s, and the Nagersfield estate, built on the former Nagersfield Brickworks and Colliery, which was owned originally by John Wheeley, and later George King Harrison Ltd, in the 1930s.

Dudley Council have assigned Hawbush as part of the Stourbridge Community Housing team.

== Education ==
It has been served by a primary school, Hawbush Primary School, since 1930, when 5–7 infant and 7–11 junior schools were opened. The infant school became the first school in September 1972, covering the 5–8 age range, while the junior school became a middle school for pupils aged 8–12. The two schools merged to form a primary school in September 1983. A nursery unit for 3 and 4 year olds was also on the site from at least 1976. The school's age range was altered to 3–11 in September 1990 after the final 12-year-olds left.

In addition, the nearby Wordsley School (formerly the Buckpool School, after the nearby nature reserve), is on the west side of the Nagersfield Estate, opened in September 1972 and holds specialisms in business & enterprise and music. In 2008, a front-page article in the Stourbridge News newspaper was run, with headteacher Mike Lambert criticising Secretary of State for Children, Schools and Families Ed Balls after Mr. Balls threatened the school with closure because it was not achieving the target of 30% A* to C GCSEs in Maths and English.
