= Withymoor Village =

Suburb of Brierley Hill, West Midlands, England

Coordinates: 52.471°N 2.123°W

Withymoor Village is an affluent residential area of Brierley Hill, West Midlands, England.

On this present day, Withymoor Village is a local housing estate that consists of approximately 2000 houses but Withymoor was not always a housing estate. In 1971 the site of Withymoor was an opencast colliery. The collieries were called the Plants Hollow and Gayfield Collieries which are now names of streets on the estate. Also while the collieries were on Withymoor there was also another business called William King's Brick Works which was a famous producer of yellow bricks from the local clay which was used in both Amblecote Church and Quarry Bank Church.

Most of Withymoor Village was built by Bovis Homes. The first bit of the development was built by Page and Johnson until their takeover by Bovis Homes, who built the remainder of the village. Later Mc Lean Homes built Beechwood Park estate between 1987 and 1989 and then later Seven Dwellings View in the mid-1990s. There was also very little developments built by Cox Homes on Turners Lane around 1985 and Kendrick Homes on the entrance of Norbury Drive and on Gayfield Avenue around the mid-1980s.

The village has approximately 2000 homes and is surrounded by a newer development, classed as Amblecote and has always historically been classed as Withymoor Village or Lakeside.

In the early 1980s a primary school was built in the village and was named Withymoor Primary School. Around the same time, a doctors surgery and Spar (formerly Dillons and now is One Stop) shop and chemist opened. The local GP was called Dr Rigler, who was a well-known character. In 1985, a J Sainsbury's supermarket opened in the centre of the village along with a Sainsbury's Freezer Centre (later a Chinese takeaway called Jasmine House which is now located on the Caledonian estate) and a newsagent called Preedys which was later changed to a Choices Video Outlet in 2006. The Chinese takeaway and the Choices Video Outlet was later closed due to Sainsbury's expansion plans. In 2007, a new doctor's surgery was built in the centre of the village, opposite Sainsbury's in a better location for transport and parking, which had been a major issue at the old surgery location.

The estate also includes a medium-sized lake (hence a newer adjoining estate is known as lakeside) that is supplied by a deep underground river. This ensures that no matter how severe a drought there is, or how much rainfall there is, the lake maintains the same level - within a few inches.

The streets in Withymoor now include Thornton Drive, Ravensitch Walk, Plants Hollow, Gayfield Avenue and Warner Drive, somewhere previously named after local curiosities. Gayfield and Plants Hollow are both former coal mines, Ravensitch is named after Wright's Farm off Woods Lane which is nearby and other streets on site are named after English places such as Barsham Drive, Briston Close, Aldeford Drive, Sedgeford Close. Other streets were also named after trees such as Palm Croft, Conifer Close and Fir Croft.

Now Withymoor Village is a modern, vibrant community. It is situated less than a mile away from Merry Hill shopping centre and there are nearby train stations in Cradley Health and Lye and Stourbridge . With a large network of cycle paths, that lead onto canals heading either to Stourbridge ( Bonded Warehouse ) and Nine Locks .
