= Halesowen News =

- Type: Weekly regional newspaper
- Format: Tabloid, Online
- Owner(s): Newsquest
- Editor: Stephanie Preece
- Founded: February 1985; 40 years ago
- Headquarters: 2nd Floor, Copthall House, 1 New Road, Stourbridge; DY8 1PH
- Country: England
- Circulation: 6,799 (as of 2023)
- Sister newspapers: Dudley News; Stourbridge News; The Shuttle
- Website: halesowennews.co.uk

The Halesowen News is a local free newspaper serving the Halesowen area of the West Midlands, England. It circulates in the town of Halesowen and its surrounding communities, as well as the neighbouring area of Rowley Regis. It has been in circulation since February 1985.
