= Brierley Hill War Memorial =

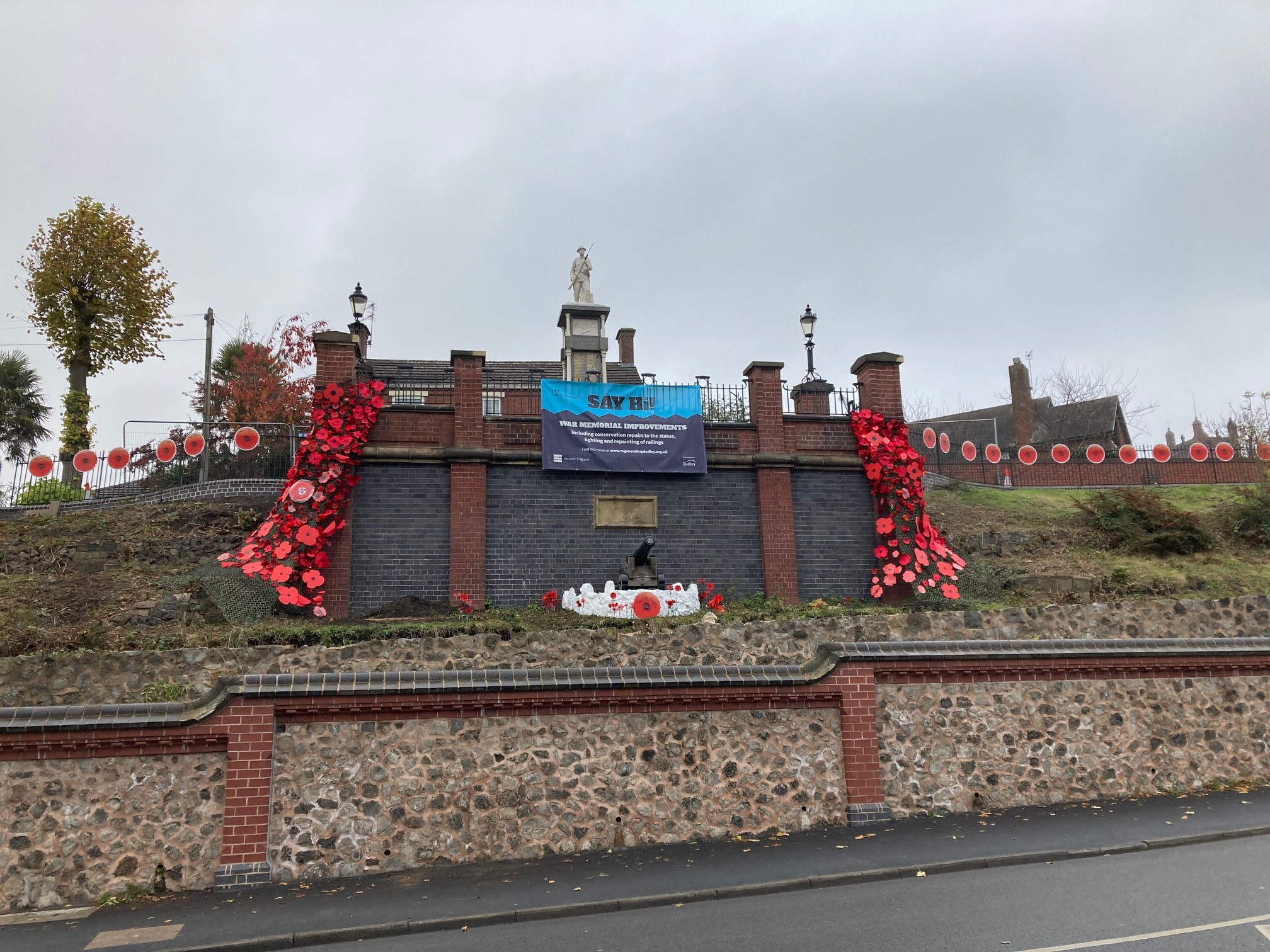
- The memorial, decorated with poppies for the 100th anniversary of its unveiling
- Alternative names: Brierley Hill Town Memorial

General information
- Type: War memorial
- Location: Church Street, Brierley Hill, Dudley, England
- Coordinates: 52.478385°N 2.125595°W
- Inaugurated: 12 November 1921
- Renovated: 2021
- Renovation cost: £250,000
- Owner: Dudley Metropolitan Borough Council

Design and construction
- Designations: Grade II listed

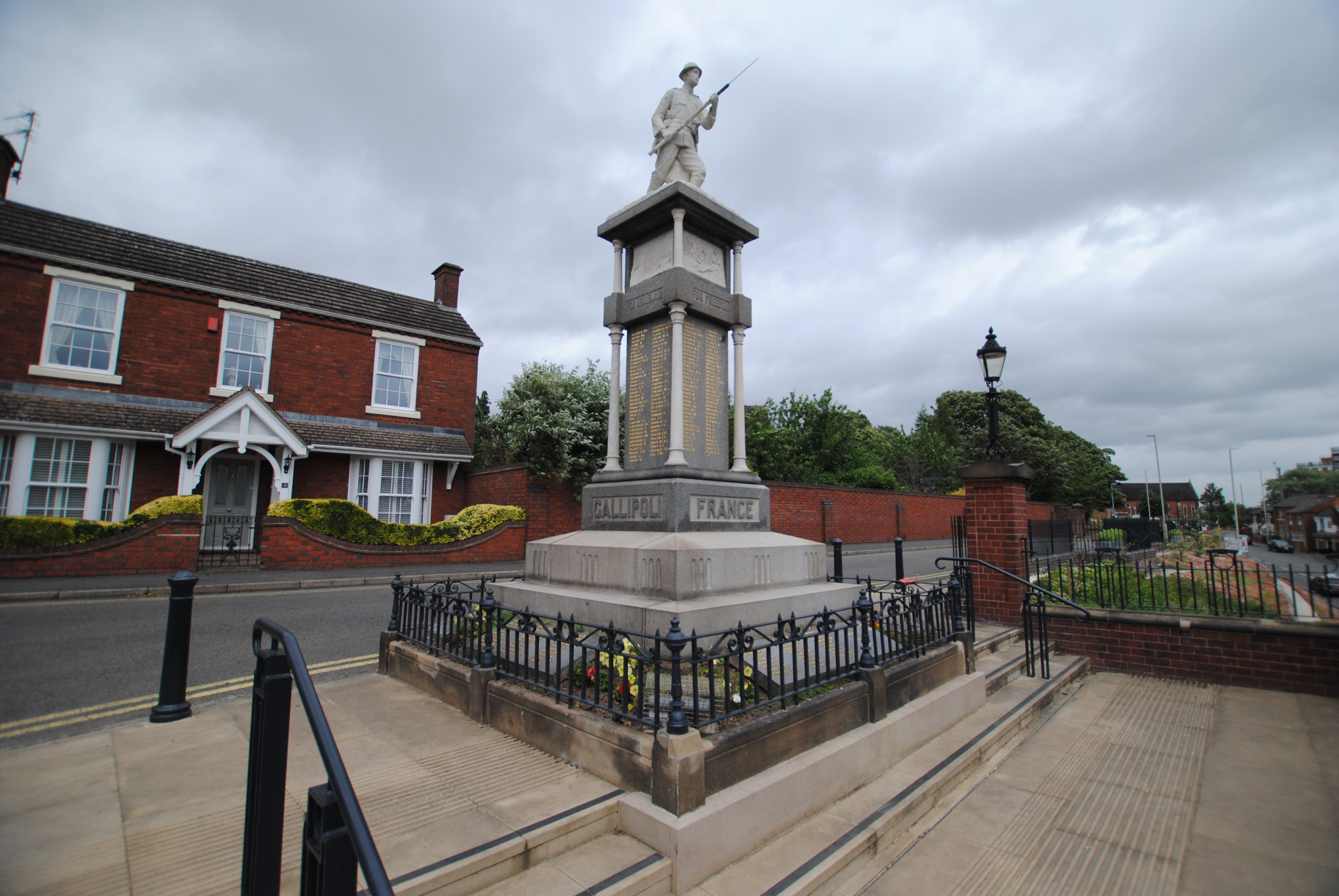
Brierley Hill War Memorial in July 2023

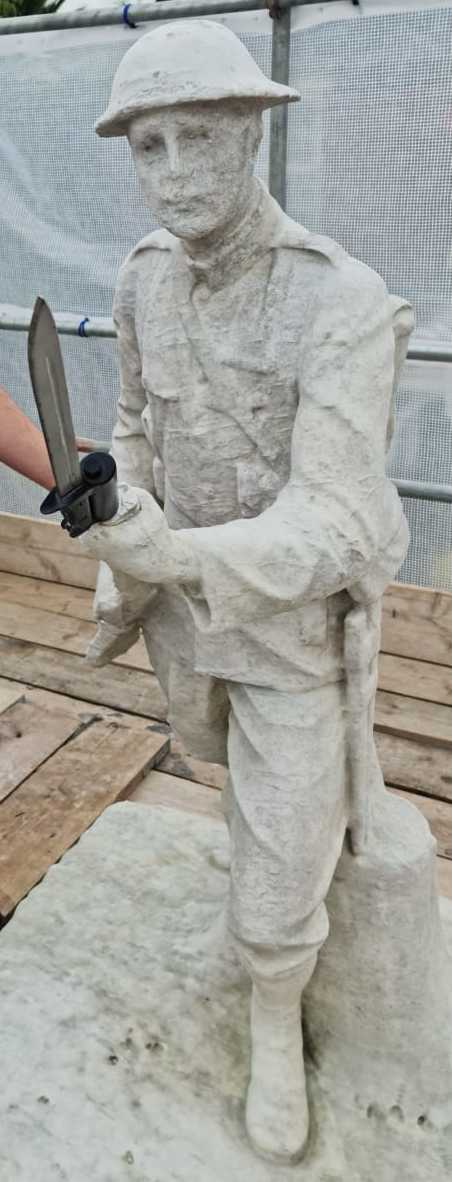
The memorial's statue during restoration in 2021

Brierley Hill War Memorial is a war memorial in Brierley Hill, (Note: At the time of the memorial's erection, Brierley Hill was an urban district in Staffordshire. It became part of the Dudley County Borough in 1966, and in 1974 the now Metropolitan Borough of Dudley became part of the West Midlands county.) Dudley, England.

Erected after World War I, the memorial stands outside St. Michael's church and was unveiled on 12 November 1921. It also now commemorates the dead of World War II, the Korean War, the Cyprus Emergency, and the Malayan Emergency on separate tablets.

The memorial, based on designs by Councillor J.T. Fereday, with additional work by local industrialist and preacher Francis Lane, consists of a statue of a charging infantry soldier in World War I uniform, carrying a rifle with a fitted bayonet, on a square granite column that also features four relief sculptures. The column sits on a limestone terrace with metal railings, supported by brick retaining walls, at the foot of which is a cannon. The statue, panels and corner columns of the plinth are of Sicilian marble. The terrace and statue overlook the nearby Clent Hills.

The statue was modelled from photographs of Stanley Harley, the first man from Brierley Hill to be awarded the Distinguished Conduct Medal, and was made by George Brown and Sons of Kidderminster.

The cannon was made by the Brierley Hill firm of Bailey and Pegg in the 18th century.

The four reliefs depict:

- Royal Army Medical Corps tending the wounded (facing Church Street)
- artillery in action (facing High Street)
- soldiers going 'over the top' (facing away from Church Street)
- HMS Arethusa sending out its boats to rescue German sailors from a ship it had sunk (facing away from High Street)

Below the four reliefs are the inscriptions: "For freedom", "For homeland", "For righteousness", and "For kindred".

Three of the four faces of the column carry the names of the dead of World War I, numbering 205 in all. The fourth, north, face carries the inscription (all in uppercase):

In gratitude & admiration

this monument
was erected by their fellow
town folk to the memory of
Brierley Hill men
who loyally gave their lives
in defence of
country and civilisation
against the aggressive
ambitions of
Germany,
Austria & Turkey
in the Great War
which lasted
from
August 4th 1914
to
November 11th 1918.
Their name
liveth
for evermore.

At the foot of the column are inscribed the names of four theatres of war, "France", "Flanders", "Gallipoli", and "Palestine".

The memorial was afforded Grade II listed status in January 2015, for its historic and artistic interest and sculptural value, giving it legal protection from unauthorised alteration or demolition. It was restored in 2021, with two new interpretation panels installed adjacent to it.
