= Pensnett Chase =

Wooded area of Dudley, England

Coordinates: 52.483°N 2.098°W

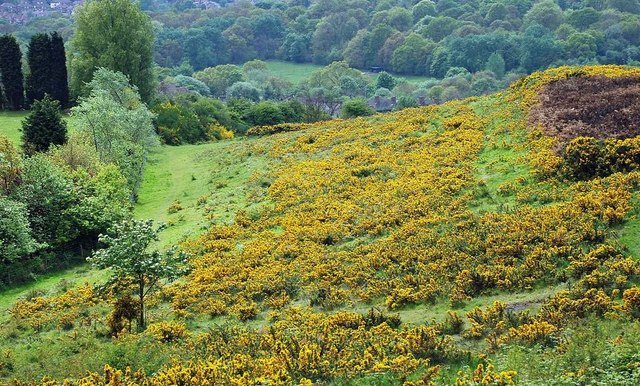
Netherton Hill with Saltwells Wood in the background. Once part of Pensnett Chase, this area was the scene of extensive coal mining and charcoal manufacture before being restored as woodland and gorse-covered hillside.

Pensnett Chase was a wooded area of land owned by the Lords of Dudley Castle in the parishes of Kingswinford and Dudley (or mainly so). As a chase, it was originally used by them to hunt game in although it was also used as common land by local people. At some periods it was regarded as extending into Gornal and including Baggeridge Wood at one end and perhaps Cradley Heath at the other. By the 17th century the ancient woodlands had largely been cleared.

In the early modern period, the Dudley portion of the Chase came to be known as Dudley Wood and the name was largely reserved for the portion in Kingswinford. This was in the 18th century an extensive area of commonland which was inclosed in the late 18th century, with the mines reserved to the lord of the manor. It extended from the area now called Pensnett through Brierley Hill to Quarry Bank.

== History ==
Pensnett Chase, a wooded area to the south and west of Dudley, came into possession of Ralph de Somery, one of the barons of Dudley castle in the early 13th century. The land had been part of the Forest of Kinver, owned by the monarch but was exchanged by King John in return for land in Wolverhampton. As the name 'Chase' suggests, the woods were used for hunting although they were also common lands, with rights for locals to graze their animals and gather wood for fuel. The name 'Pensnett' was probably derived from the two elements 'pen' meaning a hill and snaed an Old English word for a wood. The original Chase was bordered on the south by the River Stour, dividing the common land from the manor of Cradley. The western boundary is not so well defined, but a 17th-century map shows the Chase extending further than Enville. Over time, the Chase lands were reduced as parts were enclosed to become private property.

Sometime in the 1230s, a descendant of Ralph, Roger de Somery, fenced off part of the Chase to create "New Park" in order to breed deer for hunting. This area of England is in the Black Country region and was rich in industrial materials including coal, iron ore, clay and fire-clay. Coal mining had been carried out in the Chase since the 13th century at least, producing an income for the Lords of Dudley whilst they continued to use the Chase for hunting.

Iron-making and forging was introduced into the area in Tudor times and exploitation of the underground minerals was a great source of wealth for the Sutton and Ward families, who were the successors of the de Somerys. Although by the 17th century the ancient woodlands had largely been cleared new plantations of trees ensured a supply of wood to produce charcoal for the local iron industry.

The construction of the Stourbridge Canal across the Chase in 1776 made the area more attractive to industrial exploitation. Enclosure of the common lands occurred in 1784 and the land parcelled out to private owners, including the Lords of Dudley. Although this enclosure brought about the formal end of the Chase lands, the name Pensnett Chase was still applied to the area well into the 19th century. For example, in an edition of the Worcester Chronicle from 1850, it was reported 'St Mark's, Pensnett, a beautiful church built in a wood called Pensnett Chase near to Dudley ...'
