= T. H. Baker =

British jewellery retailer

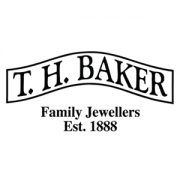
- Type: Private
- Industry: Retail
- Founded: 1888
- Founder: Thomas Henry Baker
- Headquarters: UK
- Number of locations: 21
- Key people: Alan Higgs, Andrew Higgs, Phillip Higgs
- Products: Jewellery
- Website: T. H. Baker

T. H. Baker is a luxury jewellery retailer based in the United Kingdom. Established in 1888, the company operates over 20 stores across the Midlands and southern England including PANDORA and Swarovski stores.

== History ==
T. H. Baker was founded by Thomas Henry Baker, a watchmaker and jeweller from Calne in Wiltshire. The first store was opened in Brierley Hill, where the company is still based over 125 years later. The company is still a family business five generations later, owned by great grandson Alan Higgs and his sons Andrew and Phillip Higgs.

The business now has a network of 21 stores across the UK, located throughout the Midlands and southern England including recently established PANDORA stores. T. H. Baker specialises in diamonds and watches, stocking brands such as Breitling, Omega, Gucci, Tag Heuer and Thomas Sabo.

In 2005, T. H. Baker launched The Jewel Hut, a website focusing on designer jewellery and watches. In 2010 the company launched an official T. H. Baker website specialising in luxury jewellery and watches, before later launching a third site, House of Watches in 2014.
