= Stevens Park, Quarry Bank =

Park in West Midlands, England

Stevens Park
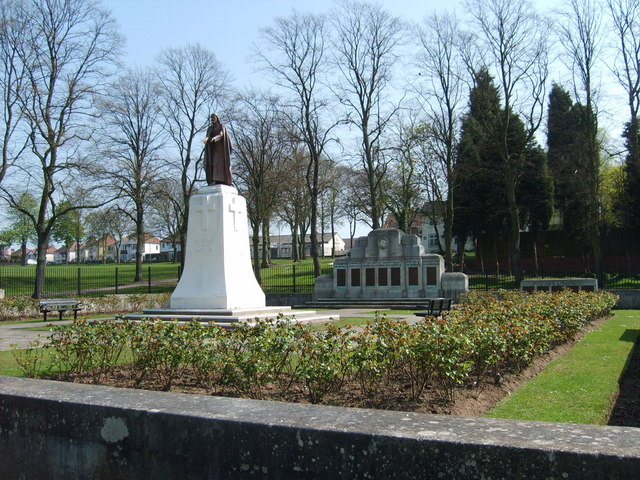
- The Peace Memorial and Garden, in Stevens Park

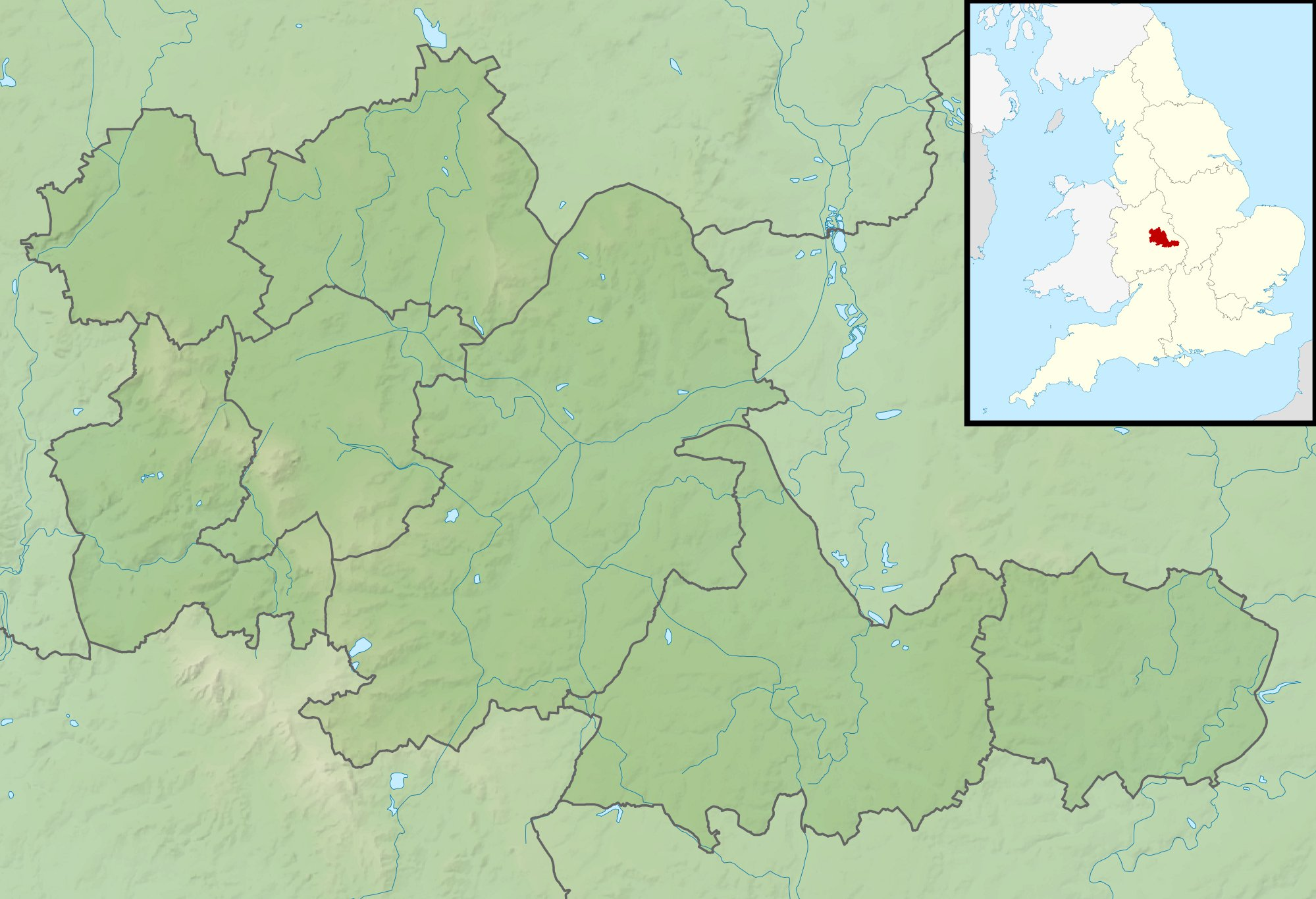
- Location within West Midlands county
- Location: Quarry Bank, West Midlands
- OS grid: SO 926 856
- Coordinates: 52°28′5″N 2°6′37″W
- Area: 7 hectares (17 acres)
- Established: 1922
- Founder: Ernest Stevens
- Operator: Metropolitan Borough of Dudley
- Website: www.dudley.gov.uk/see-and-do/parks-open-spaces/the-parks-in-the-borough/stevens-park-quarry-bank/

Stevens Park is a park of the Metropolitan Borough of Dudley, in Quarry Bank, West Midlands, England.

== Description ==
The park was donated in 1922 by the local industrialist Ernest Stevens to the people of Quarry Bank.

The area of the park is about 7 hectares (17 acres). There are many areas of managed grass, including a football pitch; there are two tennis courts, a children's play area, a skate park, a wildflower area, an exercise area, and a bandstand.

=== Peace Memorial ===
The Peace Memorial, within the park, is a memorial to the 148 members of the local community who died in the First World War. Ernest Stevens contributed most of the cost, and he designated it as a Peace Memorial. It was designed by Alfred Long, who had an architectural practice in West Bromwich, and the sculpture was created by George Edward Wade. It was unveiled and dedicated in October 1931 by the Dean of Worcester, William Moore Ede.

After the Second World War, the names of 50 men who died were added; the name of a soldier who died in Afghanistan was later added.

The monument, a more than life-sized figure of Christ, facing west, stands on a tall pylon of Portland stone; to the rear is the memorial wall. A low stone wall and railing surrounds the site. The memorial and garden are Grade II listed.

=== Restoration ===
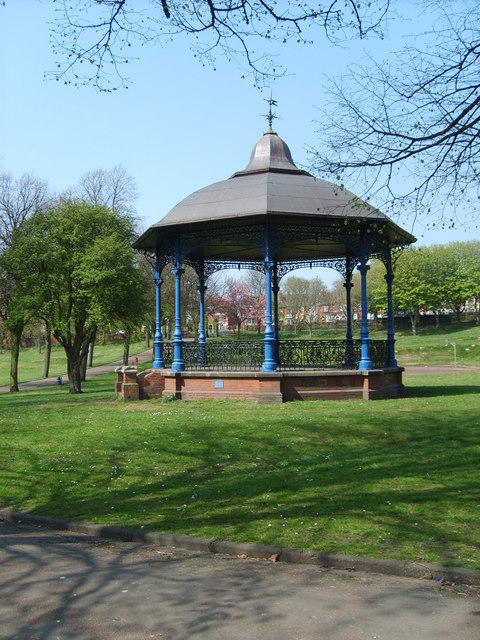
The bandstand

Dudley Council and Friends of Stevens Park were awarded funding from Parks for People (National Lottery Heritage Fund and National Lottery Community Fund) towards restoration and development work, which was completed in 2021.

Improvements included restoration of footpaths and the bandstand, and new access to the memorial within the Peace Garden. Tintern House (formerly the White House) was restored and extended to create a community café and meeting room. The Emily Jordan Foundation, a charity working to support people with learning disabilities, will operate from the building, and a range of activities and events will be delivered from the park.

Princess Diana Visit to Brierley Hill 1985

On 23rd May 1985, Princess Diana visited Royal Brierley Crystal company in Brierley Hill. After her visit she departed from Stevens Park by helicopter
