= HMS Arethusa (1913) =

Royal Navy Arethusa-class light cruiser

Coordinates: 53°58′N 6°42′E

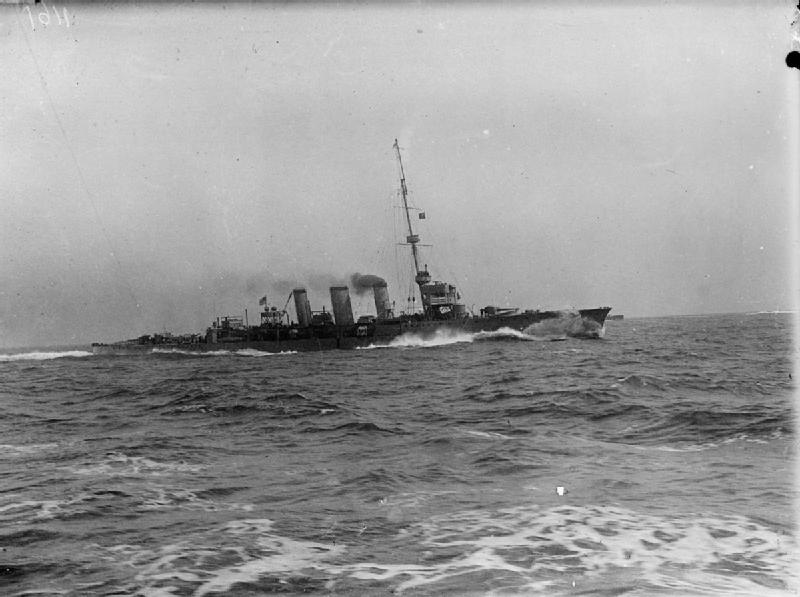
- Arethusa in 1914

History

United Kingdom
- Name: Arethusa
- Namesake: Arethusa
- Builder: Chatham Dockyard
- Laid down: 28 October 1912
- Launched: 25 October 1913
- Commissioned: August 1914
- Identification: Pennant number: 3C
- Fate: Damaged by mine, 11 February 1916 and wrecked

General characteristics (as built)
- Class & type: Arethusa-class light cruiser
- Displacement: 3,512 long tons (3,568 t)
- Length: 436 ft (132.9 m) (o/a)
- Beam: 39 ft (11.9 m)
- Draught: 15 ft 7 in (4.75 m) (mean, deep load)
- Installed power: 8 × Yarrow boilers; 40,000 shp (30,000 kW)
- Propulsion: 4 × shafts; 4 × steam turbines
- Speed: 28.5 kn (52.8 km/h; 32.8 mph)
- Complement: 270
- Armament: 2 × single 6 in (152 mm) guns; 6 × single 4 in (102 mm) guns; 1 × single 3-pdr (47 mm (1.9 in)) AA gun; 2 × twin 21 in (533 mm) torpedo tubes
- Armour: Waterline belt: 1–3 in (25–76 mm); Deck: 1 in (25 mm)

HMS Arethusa was the name ship of her class of eight light cruisers built for the Royal Navy in the 1910s. She saw a considerable amount of action during the early years of the First World War, participating in the Battle of Heligoland Bight and the Battle of Dogger Bank.

== Design and description ==
The Arethusa-class cruisers were intended to lead destroyer flotillas and defend the fleet against attacks by enemy destroyers. The ships were 456 feet 6 inches (139.1 m) long overall, with a beam of 49 feet 10 inches (15.2 m) and a deep draught of 15 feet 3 inches (4.6 m). Displacement was 3,512 long tons (3,568 t) at normal and 4,400 long tons (4,500 t) at full load. Arethusa was powered by four Brown-Curtis steam turbines, each driving one propeller shaft, which produced a total of 40,000 shaft horsepower (30,000 kW). The turbines used steam generated by eight Yarrow boilers which gave her a speed of about 28.5 knots (52.8 km/h; 32.8 mph). She carried 840 long tons (853 t) of fuel oil that gave a range of 3,200 nautical miles (5,900 km; 3,700 mi) at 16 knots (30 km/h; 18 mph).

The main armament of the Arethusa-class ships consisted of two BL 6-inch (152 mm) Mk XII guns that were mounted on the centreline fore and aft of the superstructure and six QF 4-inch (102 mm) Mk V guns in waist mountings. They were also fitted with a single QF 3-pounder 47 mm (1.9 in) anti-aircraft gun and four 21-inch (533 mm) torpedo tubes in two twin mounts.

== Construction and career ==
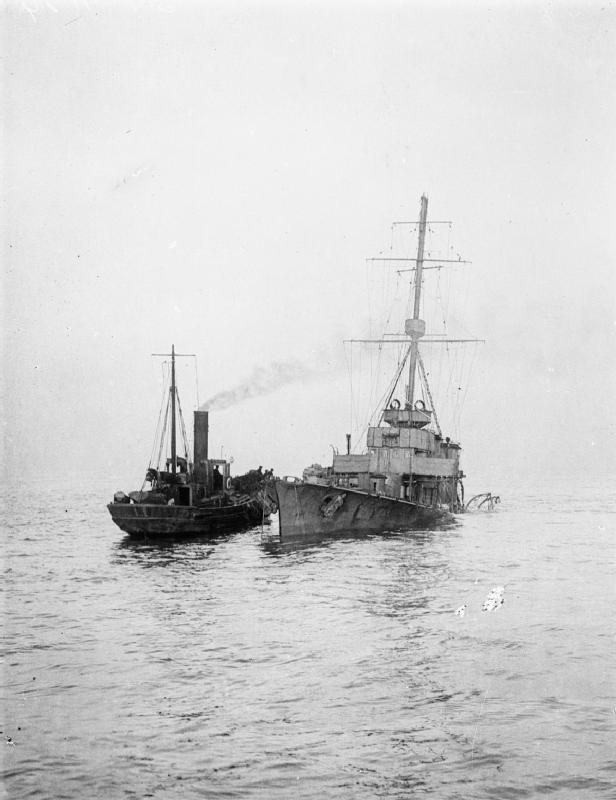
A tug alongside the wreck of Arethusa after Arethusa was badly damaged by a mine off Felixstowe, 11 February 1916

She was laid down at Chatham Dockyard in October 1912, launched on 25 October 1913, and commissioned in August 1914 as flotilla leader for the Harwich Force. On 28 August 1914, she fought at the Battle of Heligoland Bight, flying the flag of Commodore Reginald Tyrwhitt. She was seriously damaged by the German cruisers SMS Frauenlob and Stettin and had to be towed home. On 25 December, Arethusa took part in the Cuxhaven Raid and on 24 January 1915 she fought at the Battle of Dogger Bank. Later in the same year, she was transferred to the 5th Light Cruiser Squadron of the Harwich Force. In September 1915, she captured four German trawlers. On 11 February 1916, she struck a mine off Felixstowe, drifted onto a shoal while under tow, and broke her back. Approximately near Harwich (51.925, 1.295)

== Legacy ==
One of the four relief panels on Brierley Hill War Memorial, in Dudley, England, depicts Arethusa sending out its boats to rescue German sailors from a ship it had sunk.

One of Arethusa's 4-inch guns was salvaged from the wreck on 27 March 1916. It was fitted to the yacht Vittoria, serving as a minesweeper, until 27 February 1918. It was then taken on by the drill ship HMS Satellite on 25 September 1920, where it was used in anti-submarine training until the beginning of the Second World War. It was presented by the shipbreaking firm J. G. Potts to the Armstrong & Aviation Museum at Bamburgh Castle on 16 February 1948, where it remains as of 2024.

== Bibliography ==
- Brown, David K. (2010). The Grand Fleet: Warship Design and Development 1906–1922. Seaforth Publishing. ISBN 978-1-84832-085-7.
- Colledge, J. J.; Warlow, Ben & Bush, Steve (2020). Ships of the Royal Navy: The Complete Record of all Fighting Ships of the Royal Navy from the 15th Century to the Present (5th revised and updated ed.). Seaforth Publishing. ISBN 978-1-5267-9327-0.
- Corbett, Julian. Naval Operations to the Battle of the Falklands. History of the Great War: Based on Official Documents. Vol. I (2nd ed.). Imperial War Museum and Battery Press. ISBN 0-89839-256-X.
- Corbett, Julian (1997) [1929]. Naval Operations. History of the Great War: Based on Official Documents. Vol. II (Second ed.). Imperial War Museum in association with the Battery Press. ISBN 1-870423-74-7.
- Friedman, Norman (2010). British Cruisers: Two World Wars and After. Naval Institute Press. ISBN 978-1-59114-078-8.
- Pearsall, Alan (1984). "Arethusa Class Cruisers, Part I". Warship. VIII. Conway Maritime Press: 203–11. ISBN 0-87021-983-9.
- Pearsall, Alan (1984). "Arethusa Class Cruisers, Part II". Warship. VIII. Conway Maritime Press: 258–65. ISBN 0-87021-983-9.
- Preston, Antony (1985). "Great Britain and Empire Forces". In Gray, Randal (ed.). Conway's All the World's Fighting Ships 1906–1921. Naval Institute Press. pp. 1–104. ISBN 0-85177-245-5.
