= Kingswinford Academy =

Location
- Water Street; Kingswinford, West Midlands, DY6 7AD; England; 52.4994°N 2.1662°W

Information
- Type: Academy
- Motto: be extraordinary
- Established: c. 1936
- Department for Education URN: 137773 Tables
- Ofsted: Reports
- Head teacher: Ian Moreton
- Staff: 100
- Gender: Coeducational
- Age: 11 to 16
- Enrolment: 908
- Houses: Krypton, Argon, Neon, Helium
- Colours: Green, Blue, Red, and Yellow
- Website: www.kingswinford.windsoracademytrust.org.uk

Kingswinford Academy is a coeducational secondary school with academy status, located in Kingswinford, West Midlands, England.

The school is run by the standard English Education System and operates with Year 7, 8 and 9 falling under KS3 and Year 10 and 11 falling under KS4, with students choosing their GCSE subjects in Year 9 and beginning their two-year GCSE learning in Year 10.

The school is run by the head teacher, Thomas Macdonald. There is about 100 staff operating in the school and 1000 students. There are roughly 180 students per year group.

== History ==
The school was built just before World War II by the Brierley Hill Urban District Council. Subsequent local authority mergers meant that the school was later controlled by the Metropolitan Borough of Dudley, and then became a Foundation School and specialist Science College.

The Kingswinford School converted to an Academy status on 1 January 2012 and became independent of local authority control. However, the school continues to coordinate Dudley Metropolitan Borough Council for admissions. As of September 2016, the Kingswinford School joined the Windsor Academy Trust (WAT), run by Windsor High School to become part of a Multi Academy Trust (MAT). The school frequently receives financial grants from the government to help its funds and upkeeping. In easter term of 2019 the name changed from The Kingswinford School to Kingswinford Academy.

== House system ==
There are roughly 220 students per house. The current houses and their leaders as of September 2022 are:

- Krypton – Miss Amber Wall
- Neon - Mrs Jess Airey
- Argon – Mr Robert Hanson
- Helium - Mr David Cotterell

== Facilities ==
Major refurbishments and repairs have taken place since 2012 with the introduction of an observatory in 2012. In 2014, three new modern classroom facilities purposed for the English curriculum were built. In 2015 many windows, doors and classrooms were refurbished and helped modernise the school.

In May 2016, the schools canteen was demolished after being in service since 1939, to be replaced by a newer more modern refectory. The financial cost of the project, summing up to £1.5 million, was provided by The Department for Education as part of the government's Academy Programme. The refectory was planned to be finished in March 2016 but due to various administrative issues, the final completion date was reached in late March 2017 and officially opened on 19 June 2017, named "The Hedley Refectory" after former headteacher, Bronwyn Hedley. The canteen is staffed by a group of chefs and serves various meals and snacks from mellors catering company until the end of the summer term of 2022. In September 2022 the catering provider for Kingswinford Academy is Chartwells . In September 2018 the school opened the King's pod selling snackish food to students across the school.

== Notable former pupils ==
- Blessing Chitapa, singer
- Nicola Richards, politician
- Ebony Salmon, women's footballer
- Adam Finch, Cricketer
- Paul Barnett (producer) TV Producer & Director
- Andrew Rawlings (engineer) Prominent Canadian personality
