= Crestwood School =

The Crestwood School

Location
- Bromley Lane; Kingswinford, West Midlands, DY6 8QG; England; 52°29′26″N 2°09′05″W

Information
- Type: Academy
- Motto: Service Not Self
- Established: 2018
- Local authority: Dudley
- Department for Education URN: 141325 Tables
- Ofsted: Reports
- Head teacher: Phil Sutton
- Gender: Coeducational
- Age: 11 to 16
- Enrolment: 1,028
- Houses: Earth, Fire, Air and Ice
- Colours: Green, Red, Yellow and Blue
- Former name: Brierley Hill Grammar School
- Website: www.crestwoodschool.co.uk

The Crestwood School is a coeducational secondary school with academy status in Kingswinford, West Midlands, England. It is an 11-16 comprehensive school with over 900 students.

== History ==
=== Early years ===
The school was started during the 1930s as Brierley Hill Intermediate School in Mill St., Brierley Hill. It became Brierley Hill Technical School before becoming a Grammar School in the 1950s with students from the Urban District and other parts of South Staffordshire Education Authority area and Brierley Hill Parliamentary district. The Grammar School relocated to new purpose-built premises in Bromley Lane, the current building, in 1959.

It went comprehensive and was renamed The Crestwood School in 1975 and has ever since has served the eastern area of Kingswinford, which mainly developed after the Second World War. It stands on the border of Kingswinford, Pensnett and Brierley Hill townships.

The school had a sixth form until July 1991 and as of September 2015 reinstated its sixth form under the Invictus Education Trust.

In August 2006, the school completed work to insert a lift and adjoining corridors between the two main education "blocks" - A block and B block. A consequence of this is that students are now able to cross between these two blocks easily.

In December 2007, plans were unveiled to merge Crestwood with nearby Pensnett High School to form an academy but these plans were dismissed 15 months later. Soon after this the head teacher departed and this position was taken up by the deputy head of the time.

=== Recent years ===
In 2012 CCTV cameras were introduced in and around the campus to improve security, and the latest refurbishment of the school's science laboratories was completed.

On 1 March 2015 the school converted to academy status.

In 2015 The Crestwood School founded their new sixth form and is part of the "Invictus Education Trust", set up with schools which are respectfully: Leasowes High School, Ounsdale High School, Ellowes Sports College and Kinver High School.

Recently work has undergone at the school to provide a state of the art 4G Astro Pitch, a brand new canteen (called Crest Central), a new drama room, a refurbished music block, a refurbishment of the hall (which now offers new seating, a new stage and new theatre technology) and a new science block.

== Invictus Education Trust ==
The "Invictus Education Trust" is the academy to which The Crestwood School, Leasowes High School, Ounsdale High School, Ellowes Sports College and Kinver High School are all part of. The Invictus Trust was created in March 2015 by the founding schools: Crestwood School, Ounsdale High School, Ellowes Sports College and Kinver High School with Leasowes joining in Autumn 2016. The word Invictus by definition means ‘indomitable or unconquerable’. After creating the Education Trust, they then brought about the genesis of the 'Invictus Sixth Form' in which all of these schools involved are part of.

== Summary and Campus 21 ==
The Crestwood School is part of a project that involves both a standard Primary School and a Special Educational Needs (SEN) school, which work closesly with each other. The area known as Campus 21 has benefitted from investment including the building of The Brier School (SEN 5-19) and a new sports hall. The Drama department performs for the National Youth Theatre each year.

Two systems used within the school include the Buddy system, whereby Year 10 students work with new Year 7 students in a bid to help them settle in after their school change, and ambassadors, where Year 11 students assist teachers in the monitoring of students.

== Extra-curricular ==
Extra qualifications and courses include "Critical Thinking" AS level, for more gifted students, hosted by King Edward VI College, and vocational opportunities at local colleges. Other activities include debates, swimming galas and historic visits.

For option choices students have the choice of: P.E, Food technology, Product design, Geography, History, R.E, I.C.T, Drama, Art or Music as their main GCSE Course, or they have the choice to go to a local college and study different courses including: Animal management, Hair And Beauty, Construction, Business Studies, Child Care and many other courses.

== Special Educational Needs ==
Crestwood has a very active SEN policy, with a higher than average proportion of SEN students than most other schools, this has been bolstered recently by the introduction of a scheme whereby Crestwood becomes the major centre for deaf or hard of hearing students throughout the Dudley Metropolitan Borough.
