= Summerhill School, Kingswinford =

Summerhill School

Location
- Lodge Lane; Kingswinford, West Midlands, DY6 9XE; England; 52°29′40″N 2°11′03″W

Information
- Type: Community school
- Motto: Success Though Caring
- Established: 1961
- Local authority: Dudley
- Department for Education URN: 103854 Tables
- Ofsted: Reports
- Headtacher: Tim Harris
- Gender: Mixed
- Age: 11 to 16
- Enrolment: 1,034
- Houses: Draco, Orion, Pegasus and Ursa
- Website: http://www.summerhill.dudley.sch.uk/

Summerhill School is a mixed community secondary school located in Kingswinford, West Midlands, England.

== History ==
The school was built by Brierley Hill Urban District Council in 1961, and serves an area of Kingswinford which was mostly developed after the Second World War. The catchment for the school is bounded in the south by Lawnswood Road (Wordsley), in the east by Stream Road and Moss Grove (Kingswinford) and in the north and west by the county boundary between West Midlands and Staffordshire.

The 1961 buildings became increasingly dilapidated during the 1990s but by September 2003 the entire school had been rebuilt. One remaining building from the old complex, built in 1993 and known as C Block remained after the demolition of the old school and was the subject of a bid to save it from demolition and reopen as a community arts centre. The plan was developed but opposition from Dudley Metropolitan Borough Council prevented the plans from going ahead. C Block remained standing for five years until 5 November 2008, when the roof was destroyed in an arson attack. The building was finally demolished in 2011 and now acts as a parking area.

Positioning of the county boundary sign on the A4101 in the early 1980s gave the impression that half of the tennis/netball courts and 2/3 of one of the football pitches were in the county of Staffordshire rather than West Midlands. The sign was moved sometime in the 1990s, aligning it with the west edge of the school grounds. Had this not happened, it would have meant that the new school building would have appeared to be in two counties.

The school had a sixth form until July 1991.

== Performance ==
It is among the best performing secondary schools in the Dudley borough, with 78% of GCSE students gaining 5 or more A*-C grades in 2010. This placed it higher than any other state school in the borough, only exceeded by Old Swinford Hospital state boarding school.
