= Holly Hall, Dudley =

Coordinates: 52.496°N 2.109°W

Holly Hall is a residential area of Dudley in the West Midlands of England. It is situated around the A461 major road towards Brierley Hill and Stourbridge.

The area is probably best known for being the location of Pegasus Academy (Formerly Known as Holly Hall Academy), a modern secondary school which was built in 1968 to replace an older building further down the road towards Brierley Hill.

Dudley Cemetery was erected on the main Stourbridge Road through Holly Hall in the late 19th century.

Most of Holly Hall was developed after 1920, with a mix of private and council housing.

Duncan Edwards, the footballer who died in February 1958 as a result of injuries sustained in the Munich air disaster, was born at 23 Malvern Crescent in Holly Hall on 1 October 1936, although he spent most of his life living at Elm Road on the Priory Estate about two miles away.
