= Adam Finch =

English cricketer (born 2000)

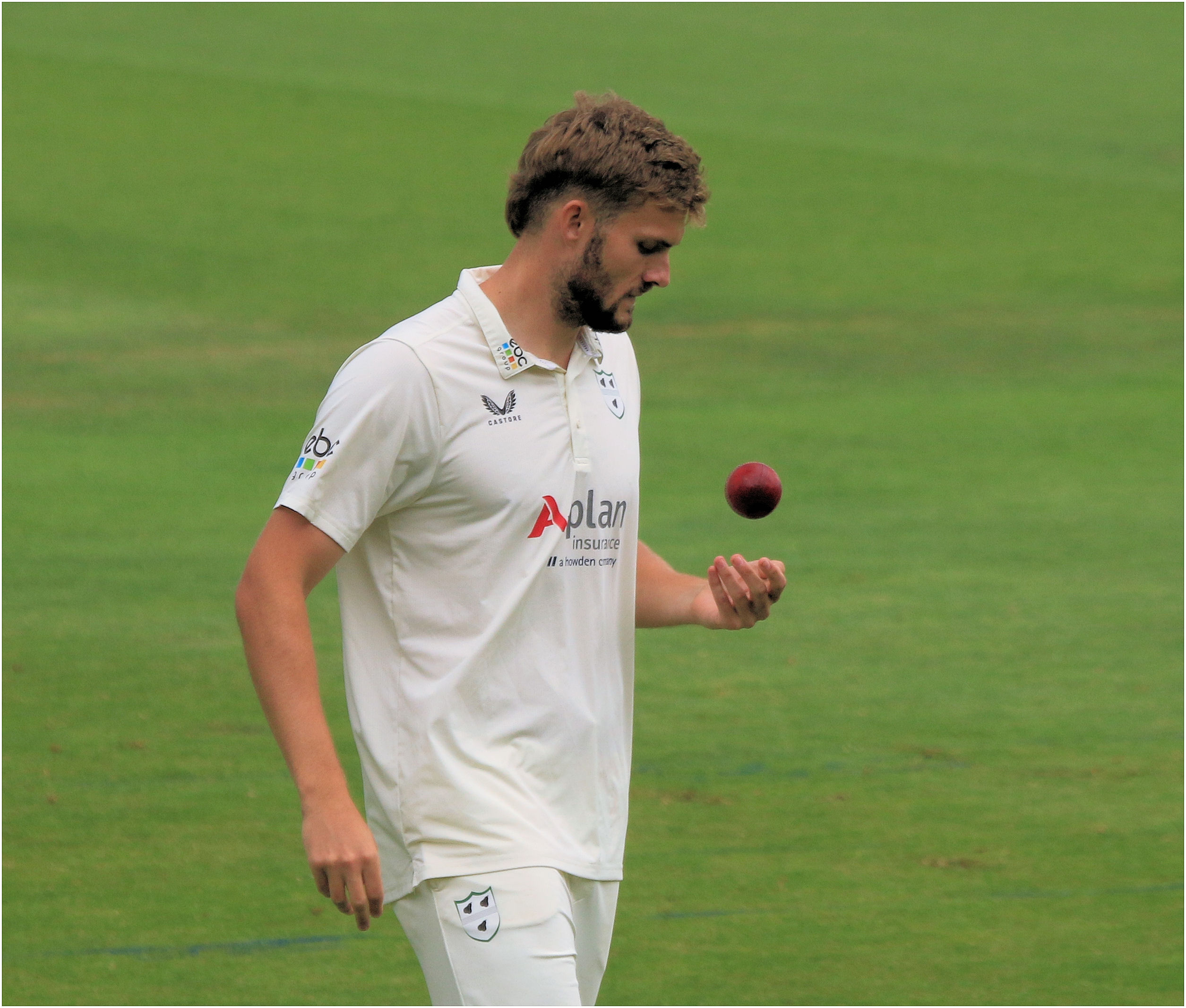
- Finch in 2023

Personal information
- Full name: Adam William Finch
- Born: 28 May 2000 (age 26); Wordsley, West Midlands, England
- Batting: Right-handed
- Bowling: Right-arm fast-medium
- Role: Bowler

Domestic team information
- Years: Team
- 2019–present: Worcestershire (squad no. 61)
- 2020: → Surrey (on loan)
- First-class debut: 10 June 2019 Worcestershire v Lancashire
- List A debut: 25 July 2021 Worcestershire v Kent

Career statistics
Competition	FC	LA	T20
Matches	43	17	39
Runs scored	579	71	63
Batting average	14.47	14.20	6.30
100s/50s	0/0	0/0	0/0
Top score	43	24	30*
Balls bowled	5,911	717	794
Wickets	105	16	43
Bowling average	36.94	46.31	28.58
5 wickets in innings	2	0	0
10 wickets in match	0	0	0
Best bowling	5/74	3/54	3/28
Catches/stumpings	5/–	1/–	5/–
- Source: Cricinfo, 27 September 2026

Adam William Finch (born 28 May 2000) is an English cricketer from Kingswinford, where he attended The Kingswinford School and later Old Swinford Hospital School. He made his first-class debut on 10 June 2019, for Worcestershire in the 2019 County Championship. Prior to his first-class debut, he was named in England's squad for the 2018 Under-19 Cricket World Cup. He made his Twenty20 debut on 3 September 2020, for Worcestershire in the 2020 t20 Blast. He made his List A debut on 25 July 2021, for Worcestershire in the 2021 Royal London One-Day Cup. In July 2026 he was named a wildcard pick for the Manchester Super Giants, a team taking part in The Hundred competition. In October 2026 had was named as part of the England Lions squad, being selected for both the T20 and 50-over squads for November's tour of the Caribbean.
