= Kingswinford Rural District =

Former local government area in the UK

Coordinates: 52.49°N 2.17°W

Kingswinford
- Area
  - 1911: 5,691 acres (23 km^{2})
- Population
  - 1911: 20,803
  - 1931: 22,804
- History
  - Created: 1894
  - Abolished: 1934
  - Succeeded by: Brierley Hill Urban District; Seisdon Rural District
- Status: Rural District
- Government: Rural District Council
  - HQ: Kingswinford

Kingswinford Rural District was a rural district in Staffordshire, England from 1894 to 1934. It was created by the Local Government Act 1894, and originally consisted of the two parishes of Amblecote and Kingswinford. Amblecote became a separate urban district in 1898, leaving Kingswinford the only parish in the district.

The district was abolished in 1934 under a County Review Order. Most of the parish was added to the Brierley Hill Urban District, with Prestwood and Ashwood being added to the parish of Kinver in the Seisdon Rural District. Since 1974, the former now forms a part of the Metropolitan Borough of Dudley in the West Midlands, whilst the area in Kinver parish is in the South Staffordshire district.

== Neighbourhoods ==
- Wall Heath
- Kingswinford
- High Acres
- Mount Pleasant
- Ashwood Park
- Bromley Hills
- Blaze Park
