= Stourbridge News =

- Type: Weekly regional newspaper
- Format: Tabloid, Online
- Owner(s): Newsquest
- Editor: Stephanie Preece
- Founded: February 1985; 40 years ago
- Headquarters: 2nd Floor, Copthall House, 1 New Road, Stourbridge; DY8 1PH
- Country: England
- Circulation: 9,386 (as of 2023)
- Sister newspapers: Dudley News; Halesowen News
- Website: stourbridgenews.co.uk

The Stourbridge News is a local free newspaper which serves the Stourbridge area of the West Midlands, England, circulating in the town itself and the surrounding communities of Amblecote, Hagley, Lye, Pedmore, and Wordsley. Originally The County Express, it has been in circulation since February 1985.

== Staff and journalists ==
Past journalists include Lyn Alderson who was a journalist for over 20 years. Another journalist that had longevity with the paper was Dennis Elwell. He spent 30 years at the Stourbridge News. He died in 2014 aged 84.
