= Pensnett =

Village in the West Midlands, England

Coordinates: 52.50°N 2.13°W

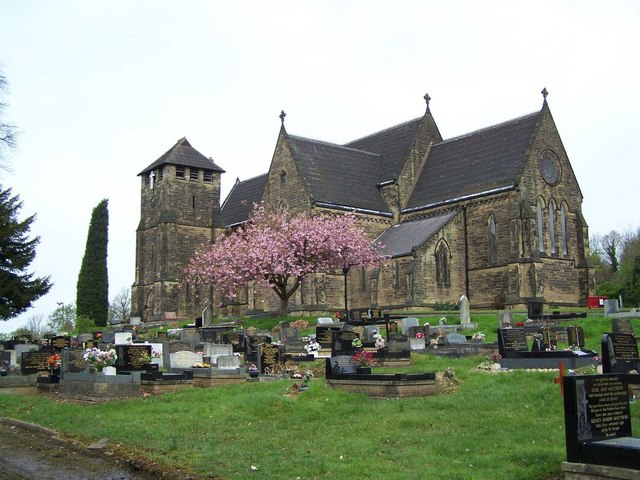
- St Mark's Church, Pensnett

- Location within the West Midlands
- Population: 12,923 (2011. Ward. Brockmoor and Pensnett)
- OS grid reference: SO912890
- Metropolitan borough: Dudley
- Metropolitan county: West Midlands
- Region: West Midlands
- Country: England
- Sovereign state: United Kingdom
- Post town: BRIERLEY HILL
- Postcode district: DY5
- Dialling code: 01384
- Police: West Midlands
- Fire: West Midlands
- Ambulance: West Midlands
- UK Parliament: Dudley South

Pensnett is a village of the Metropolitan Borough of Dudley, West Midlands County, England, 2 miles (3.2 km) south-west of Dudley. Pensnett has been a part of Dudley since 1966, when the Brierley Hill Urban District, of which it was a part, was absorbed into the County Borough of Dudley, later the Metropolitan Borough of Dudley from 1974.

== Pensnett Chase ==
The present Pensnett covers a small portion of what was a large common called Pensnett Chase in Kingswinford parish, but contiguous with Dudley Wood in Dudley. As such, it belonged to the lords of the manor, descending as part of the Dudley estate from medieval times. With Dudley Wood, it is probably the woodland mentioned in the Domesday Book as belonging to those manors. There is a rifle range on the chase at barrow bank, which was being used for practice firing by volunteer regiments from at least 1860 through till 1920 with many Martini–Henry bullets being found by local metal detectorists.

The name Pensnett is from the Celtic 'pen', for hill and the Anglo-Saxon snaed for 'a piece of woodland'. For many years, it was used as commonland, for animal grazing and a hunting reserve of the lords of Dudley. Pensnett Chase was enclosed under the Pensnett Chase Inclosure Act 1784 (24 Geo. 3. Sess. 2. c. 18 Pr.). This reserved mining rights to the lord of the manor, but included a clause to compensate people for mining subsidence. The mining of coal and ironstone was long established, and probably goes back to medieval times.

== History of Pensnett ==
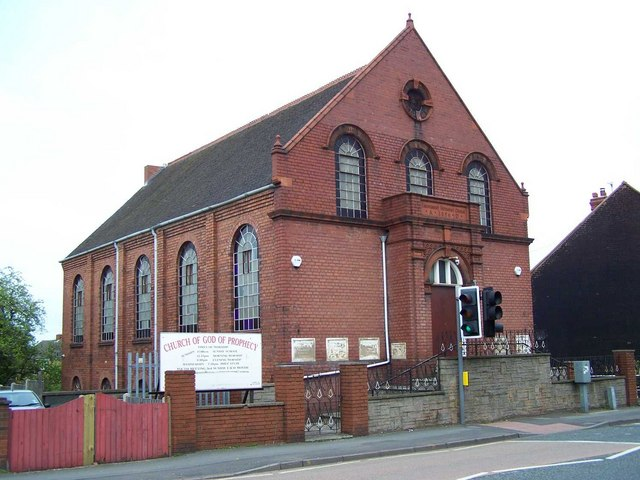
The Church of God of Prophecy

The earliest evidence of humans in the area is the presence of two Bronze Age (2000BC to 700BC) barrow burial chambers situated in the Barrow Hill Local Nature Reserve, which have since been damaged by quarrying.

The present settlement of Pensnett dates from only the period after the inclosure of Pensnett Chase. Pensnett was made part of the parish of St Mark's, Pensnett in 1844. Towards the end of the 19th century the area began a period of dramatic change. Several factories were built in Pensnett and the factory workers were mostly employed in the iron and steel industries. Many terraced houses with shop fronts were developed along the village's High Street around the start of the 20th century, but the biggest changes were yet to come.

After World War I, Brierley Hill Urban District Council followed the example of almost every local authority in Britain and built houses, which were to be rented to working-class families. Several hundred council houses were built in the Pensnett area between 1920 and 1966, although a large percentage of the village's homes were privately owned.

== Location ==
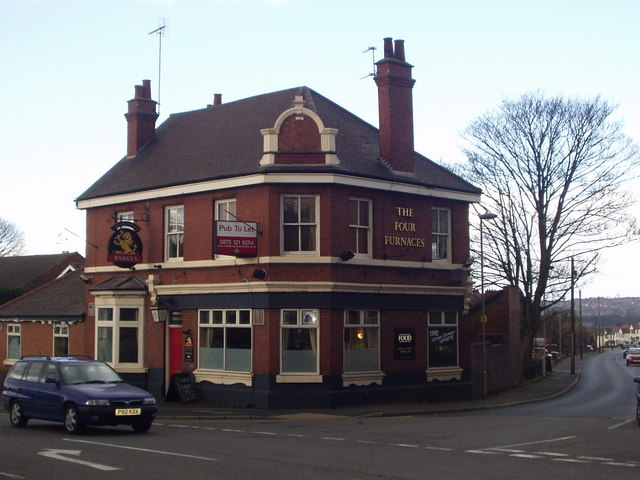
The Four Furnaces pub, now a fish and chip shop

Pensnett lies in the Brierley Hill DY5 postal district. As it is close to the Merry Hill Shopping Centre, built during the 1980s, the roads around Pensnett are often congested. As long ago as the early 1990s, there were plans to build a relief road around Pensnett, but nothing has yet come of them.

== Trading estate ==
The Pensnett Trading Estate has gradually expanded since about 1970. It was mostly developed in the 1980s. It includes many industrial and commercial businesses, and since 2000 has included a National Express West Midlands bus depot, which replaced a depot in the Merry Hill Shopping centre.

Pensnett Halt railway station closed in 1932 and the freight sidings closed in 1994 although some sections of track remain buried in the undergrowth.

== Education ==
The nearest primary school is Bromley Pensnett Primary School, situated just around the corner from the site of Pensnett High School.

The local secondary school was Pensnett High School in Tiled House Lane, which was previously known as Pensnett School of Technology and Pensnett Secondary Modern School, having opened in 1932. The school changed from Pensnett School of Technology to Pensnett High School in 2007. After much speculation about its future, it was scheduled for a phased closure beginning in July 2011, with the 12- and 13-year-old pupils transferring to new schools in September that year, and no 11-year-olds being admitted. However, the school's oldest two year groups remained at the school to complete their studies before it finally closed completely in July 2013. Most children living in the Pensnett area now attend Crestwood School in Kingswinford or Holly Hall Academy in Dudley.

The local authority's Learning Support centre was situated on Birds Meadow from 1978 until 1989, within the buildings of the former Birds Meadow Infant School, which dated back to the 1930s. The site was redeveloped for private housing in the early 1990s.

== Barrow Hill Local Nature Reserve ==
Barrow Hill Local Nature Reserve is situated in Pensnett, near St Mark's Church. The hill in the reserve is formed by an extinct volcano, which erupted around 315 million years ago.

== See also ==
- Kingswinford Junction
- Pensnett Canal
