= Quarry Bank =

Village in the West Midlands County, England

Coordinates: 52.4721°N 2.1078°W

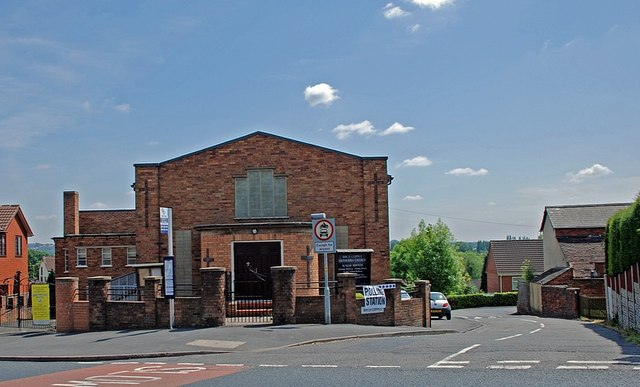
- The Birch Coppice Methodist Church at Quarry Bank

- Location within the West Midlands
- Population: 12,441 (2011.ward.Quarry Bank and Dudley Wood)
- OS grid reference: SO930860
- Metropolitan borough: Dudley
- Metropolitan county: West Midlands
- Region: West Midlands
- Country: England
- Sovereign state: United Kingdom
- Post town: BRIERLEY HILL
- Postcode district: DY5
- Dialling code: 01384
- Police: West Midlands
- Fire: West Midlands
- Ambulance: West Midlands
- UK Parliament: Halesowen

Quarry Bank is a village in the Metropolitan Borough of Dudley in the West Midlands County, England.

== History ==
Originally the area was a rural place, a remote part of the parish of Kingswinford, included in Pensnett Chase. The earliest settlements in Quarry Bank were smallholdings, where industrial workers such as nailers lived. Early industrial development took place the early 17th century around the Cradley Forge.

Quarry Bank was formerly a chapelry in the parish of Kings-winford, on 31 December 1894 Quarry Bank became a separate civil parish, being formed from the part of the parish of Kingswinford in Quarry Bank Urban District. It had an urban sanitary authority and so became an urban district of Staffordshire from 1894. However, in 1934, it was merged with the Brierley Hill Urban District. On 1 April 1966 the parish was abolished and merged with Dudley, part also went to form Warley. In 1951 the parish had a population of 9415. It became part of the county borough of Dudley in 1966 and then the Metropolitan Borough of Dudley in West Midlands in 1974.

Quarry Bank has become greatly affected by the adjacent Merry Hill Shopping Centre (which was developed between 1984 and 1989), with the shopping precinct bringing high volumes of traffic along the High Street. This has meant demolition of more than 30 homes on the main Merry Hill road in 1997, the closure of the top end of the former High Street (now Sun Street) in 1998, and construction of a new replacement section of High Street to try and cope with traffic.

An unusual feature of Quarry Bank is its long steep High Street, hence "Bank", which slopes from the bottom end where it meets the neighbouring town of Cradley to the top at the junction with Thorns Road. Clinging to the hillside and varying from very steep to almost flat, it has changed little, except for modernisation of shop fronts. Major retail chains have bypassed the town, leaving just small independent traders and public houses.

=== Modern ===
In 2008, Quarry Bank library was closed, despite protests by local residents and local councillors. The library building was sold off by Dudley Council, and has since become a gym. The money raised from the sale was used to fund improvements to libraries in other parts of the Borough.

In 2011, Saltwells House, a historic house which Dudley Council had allowed to fall into decay, was demolished. Future plans for the site are not known, though it is suspected the site will be sold off to private developers.

== Schools ==
=== Mount Pleasant Primary School ===
A local landmark is Mount Pleasant Primary School with its prominent bell tower. The current building was opened in the west of the old village on 10 September 1888, replacing temporary accommodation used for an infants department from 1882. Within a few months of opening, pupil numbers increased from 43 to 205. The school's first head teacher was Mr W.E. Hunt, the school's longest serving head (1888-1930). In fact, Mount Pleasant has only had nine appointed head teachers in total since the current building was first opened 131 years ago:

- 1888 to 1930 - Mr W E Hunt
- 1930 to 1936 - Mr J S Cadman
- 1936 to 1951 - Mr S Allchurch
- 1951 to 1971 - Mr T Owen
- 1972 to 1977 - Mr A G Perry
- 1978 to 1984 - Mr G S Nunn
- 1984 to 2006 - Mrs G K Bedford
- 2006 to 2017 - Mrs J Hartill
- 2017 to 2018 - Mrs L Capener (acting head)
- 2018 to 2024 - Mrs H Robinson
- 2024 to present - Mrs C Grinsell

The school covers the 3-11 age range, including a nursery unit which opened in the early 1990s around the time that the existing school buildings were expanded. It also had 12-year-olds on its roll from 1972 to 1990.

=== Other schools ===
The other local primary school is Quarry Bank Primary School, in the High Street, which opened in 1935 and was rebuilt in 2011.

The local secondary school is Thorns Collegiate Academy, an 11-16 academy and former comprehensive, which opened in September 1977 to replace the former boys and girls secondary modern schools in Coppice Lane, which had been built in the 1930s. The first building at the site actually opened about five years earlier as an annexe to the Coppice Lane site. Three more buildings were added at the site between 1980 and 1991, by which time the school had 1,200 pupils on its roll.

== Scout group ==
It also has a Scout Group which was registered in 1922 - 1st Quarry Bank Scout Group. It caters for children from all of the local primary schools and has been a cornerstone of the community, with most families in the area having some ties to it. Its headquarters is at 1st Quarry Bank Scout Hut, Bobs Coppice Walk, Brierley Hill, DY5 2DX. In its history it has been based at several locations and has close ties with the local Community Association, churches and the Royal British Legion. Some of its members also went on to start the Kewford Eagles Football team in Wall Heath on Swindon Road.

== See also ==
- Stevens Park, Quarry Bank
