= Brierley Hill Urban District =

Former local government area in the UK

Coordinates: 52.48°N 2.122°W

Brierley Hill District of Brierley Hill
- Urban District
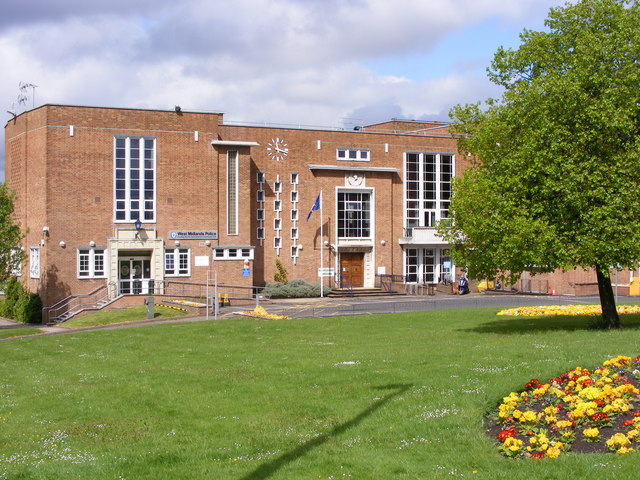
- Former Brierley Hill Civic Centre, now Brierley Hill Police Station
- Area
  - 1911: 1,016 acres (4 km^{2})
  - 1961: 5,851 acres (24 km^{2})
- Area transferred
  - 1934: 4,246 acres (17 km^{2}) from Kingswinford Rural District
  - 1934: 666 acres (3 km^{2}) from Quarry Bank Urban District
- Population
  - 1911: 12,263
  - 1961: 56,075
- History
  - Preceded by: Sanitary district
  - Origin: Local Government Act 1894
  - Created: 1894
  - Abolished: 1966
  - Succeeded by: County Borough of Dudley; Metropolitan Borough of Dudley
- Status: Urban District
- Government: Brierley Hill District Council
  - Type: Urban District Council
  - HQ: Civic Centre, Brierley Hill
  - Motto: Sine labore nihil floret (Latin) "Without labour nothing prospers"
- Arms of Brierley Hill District Council
- Contained within
  - County: Staffordshire

Brierley Hill Urban District was an Urban District in Staffordshire, England, comprising the areas of Brierley Hill, Kingswinford, Quarry Bank, and Pensnett, now within the modern-day Dudley Metropolitan Borough in the West Midlands county.

Brierley Hill became an urban district in 1894 under the Local Government Act. Previously, it had been an urban sanitary authority within the parish of Kingswinford. It was greatly expanded in 1934, when it took in the Quarry Bank and Kingswinford districts. It remained an independent urban district until 1966, when it was merged into the Dudley County Borough under the advice of the Local Government Commission for England.
