= Dudley News =

- Type: Weekly newspaper
- Format: Tabloid, Online
- Owner(s): Newsquest
- Editor: Stephanie Preece
- Founded: February 1985; 40 years ago
- Headquarters: 2nd Floor, Copthall House, 1 New Road, Stourbridge; DY8 1PH
- Country: England
- Circulation: 6,799 (as of 2023)
- Sister newspapers: Stourbridge News; Halesowen News
- Website: www.dudleynews.co.uk

The Dudley News is a local free newspaper serving the Dudley area of the West Midlands, England. Only serving the town itself and surrounding communities, the Stourbridge and Halesowen areas of the Dudley Borough are served by the respective sister publications, Stourbridge News and Halesowen News.

Politically, the paper identifies itself as progressive.
