= Kingswinford =

Village in the West Midlands, England

Coordinates: 52.498°N 2.166°W

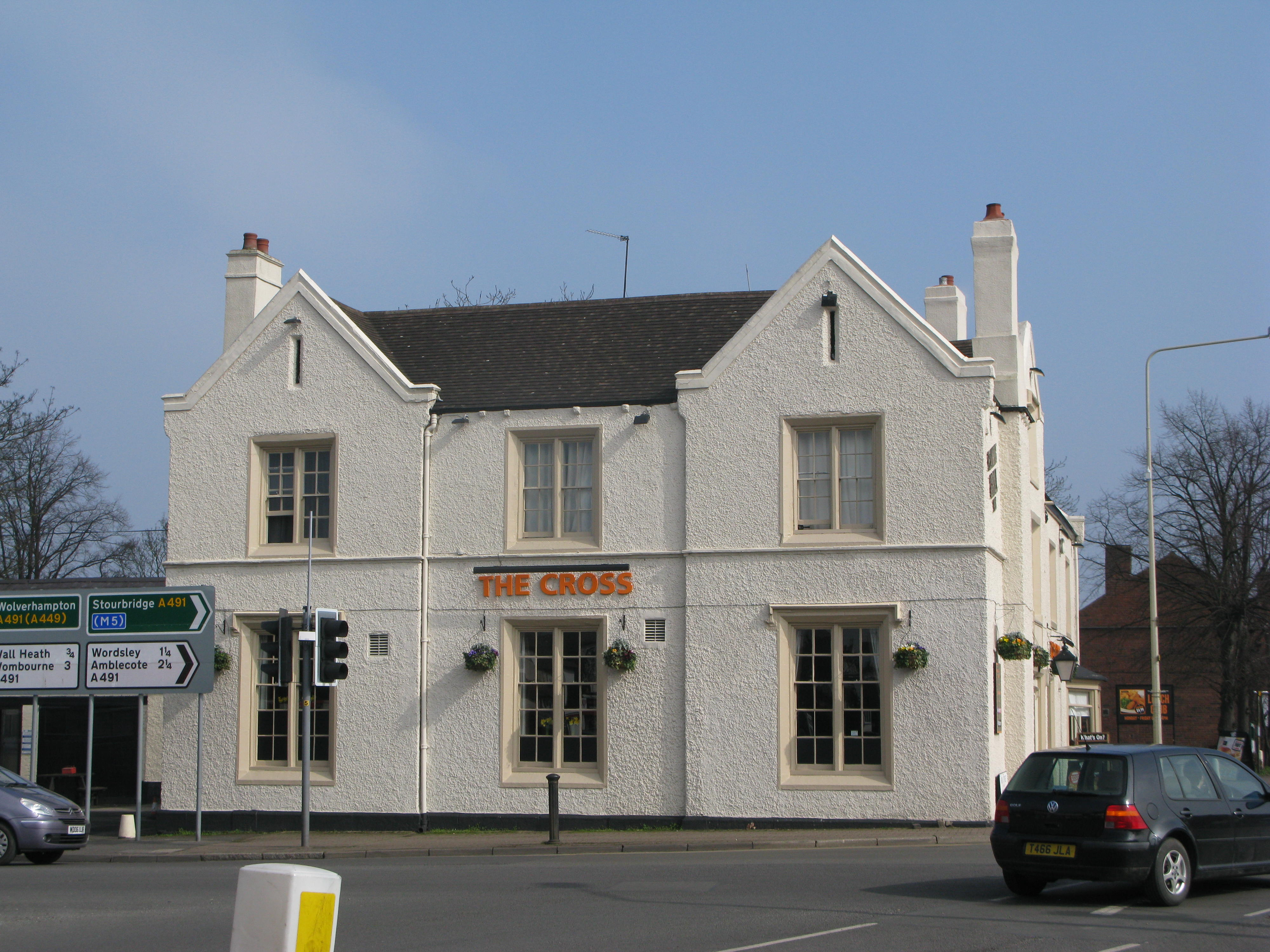
- The Cross public house, Kingswinford

- Flag

- Location within the West Midlands
- Population: 51,910 (2021 census)
  - London: 111 miles (179 km)
- Metropolitan borough: Dudley
- Metropolitan county: West Midlands
- Region: West Midlands
- Country: England
- Sovereign state: United Kingdom
- Post town: Kingswinford
- Postcode district: DY6
- Dialling code: 01384
- Police: West Midlands
- Fire: West Midlands
- Ambulance: West Midlands
- UK Parliament: Kingswinford and South Staffordshire

Kingswinford is a town of the Metropolitan Borough of Dudley in the West Midlands County, England. It is situated 5 miles (8 km) west-southwest of Dudley, bordering Staffordshire. In 2021, the Kingswinford built-up area had a population of 51,910.

Positioned at the far western edge of the West Midlands conurbation, it borders on a rural area extending past the River Severn; but its position at the edge of the Black Country and its long standing in the area means it has had significant industrial influence in the past. This is illustrated by the influence in creating local workhouses, which shows a population of 15,000 plus in the 1831 census.

== History ==
Kingswinford has historically been in Staffordshire. The larger Kingswinford manor mentioned in the Domesday Book of 1086 was located in the hundred of Seisdon in Staffordshire, with exclaves in Oldswinford in the ancient hundred of Clent in Worcestershire. Rural manors perpetuated noncontiguous holdings to allow diverse agriculture production and decrease risk of catastrophic crop failure due to natural disasters. The name Kingswinford relates to a ford for the King's swine (Kingswin(e)ford) – Latin Swinford Regis. The ancient parish of Kingswinford spanned Wordsley, Brierley Hill and Quarry Bank.

The parishes of Kingswinford and Amblecote formed the Kingswinford Rural District in 1894, and gave its name to the Kingswinford Parliament constituency from 1885 until 1950. However, Amblecote became its own urban district in 1898, leaving Kingswinford one of a minority of single-parish rural districts in England. Kingswinford rural district was added to the Brierley Hill Urban District in 1934, which became part of the County Borough of Dudley in 1966, now the Metropolitan Borough of Dudley. However, the rural part of the parish was removed to Kinver in 1933, becoming part of Seisdon Rural District in 1966 and since 1974 part of South Staffordshire. In 1951 the parish had a population of 27,757. On 1 April 1966 the parish was abolished and merged with Dudley, Stourbridge, Himley and Kinver, part also went to form Warley.

Recent house building, commencing in the 1950s and 1960s, has largely destroyed the original rural character of Kingswinford, the result being the complete absorption of the former village into the adjoining urban area.

Until its closure in 2012, Kingswinford was home to food retailer Julian Graves' head office and distribution centre.

== Geography ==
Kingswinford is a part of the West Midlands metropolitan county, West Midlands conurbation, and the Metropolitan Borough of Dudley. It is situated on the extreme western edge of the conurbation, and to the north, east and south lie other suburban areas of the Black Country. However, the border to the west is green belt, which stretches for many miles through Staffordshire, Shropshire, beyond the Severn Valley and into Wales.

The Kingswinford DY6 postal district covers the entirety of Kingswinford and its suburban village of Wall Heath, as well as nearby rural areas such as Hinksford and Ashwood.

== Places of interest ==
=== Glass Museum ===
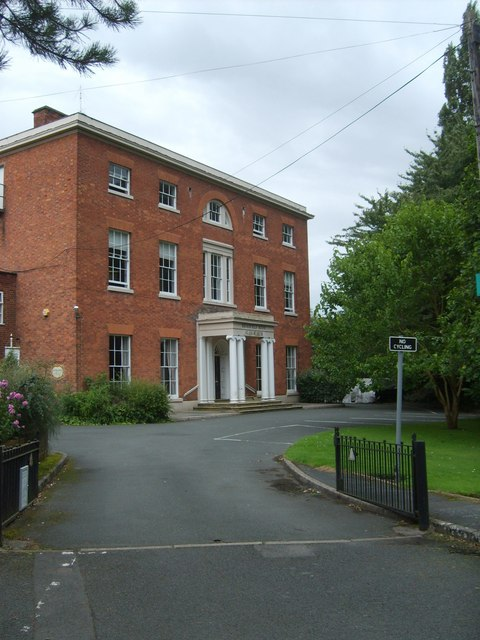
The former Broadfield House Glass Museum

Broadfield House Glass Museum, on Compton Drive, was housed in a grade II listed building set in its own grounds, and formed part of the historic Stourbridge Glass Quarter. It had a notable collection of British glass, much of it made locally, from historic 18th-century pieces to contemporary works from Britain's leading glass artists. Plans to retain the collection at Broadfield House were shattered and the museum eventually closed in September 2015, to make way for a new glass museum in nearby Wordsley. The Broadfield Glass museum closed before 2020 and exhibits were transferred to the new Glass Museum situated opposite the Wordsley Cone approx 1 mile away.

=== Holbeche House ===
Near Kingswinford is Holbeche House, a small country house which has now been turned into a nursing home although as of August 2023 is boarded up. It was here in 1605 that most of the men who had attempted to blow up Parliament with Guy Fawkes were cornered, and a bloody gunfight ensued, resulting in the deaths of at least four of the conspirators, including their leader Robert Catesby. Bullet holes can still be seen in the house's walls, but it is not open to the public. Many of the streets of the Charterfields housing development, built during the 1970s, adopted the names of the Gunpowder Plot conspirators, such as Catesby Drive (Robert Catesby), Digby Road (Sir Everard Digby), Keyes Drive (Robert Keyes), Tresham Road (Francis Tresham), Ambrose Crescent (Ambrose Rokewood), Monteagle Drive (William Parker, 4th Baron Monteagle) and Rokewood Close (Ambrose Rokewood).

=== The Cross Inn ===
Located in the heart of Kingswinford on the corner of Moss Grove and the High Street lies the Cross Inn. The building was grade II listed in the 1970s. First recorded in the 1750 parish map, it was owned in the early 19th century by Diana Briscoe of Summerhill House. The pub was purchased from a previous owner by Wetherspoons in 2019.

=== Townsend ===
There is an area at the end of Kingswinford which has been known as Townsend dating back to 19th century maps of the area. It was centred on Townsend House, the family seat of the Badley family from the 17th until the early 20th century. The Georgian house was demolished in the 1950s to build a shopping precinct. John Badley of Townsend (1678–1768) was an ancestor of John Badley and John Haden Badley, the centenarian educator and founder of Bedales School.

=== Local churches ===
The parish church of St. Mary dates back to the 11th century, although much of the main body of the building is from the 17th century. It contains a notable Norman carving of St. Michael slaying the dragon. The church is also home to a well-regarded two manual Nicholson and Lord pipe organ. It remained the church of the huge parish of Kingswinford until it was closed because of mining activities in 1831, when a new parish church was built, Holy Trinity Church in Wordsley. It reopened in 1846, initially as a chapel of ease, before regaining parochial status (with a smaller parish). It is the parish church for the Kingswinford Team of Anglican churches. The building is now grade II listed. The churchyard contains Commonwealth war graves of four service personnel of World War I and six of World War II.

In addition to the parish church, Kingswinford is also home to several churches of other denominations, including:

- Our Lady of Lourdes R.C. Church
- Arise Church UK
- Crestwood Church
- Kingswinford Methodist Church
- Kingswinford Christian Fellowship

== Transport ==
Kingswinford is well served by buses that connect it to Dudley, Stourbridge, Wolverhampton, Merry Hill and Brierley Hill. There has never been an official rail connection in Kingswinford, but there were halts on the now-disused Wombourne Branch Line. The nearest stations were the Gornal Halt, Himley, and Pensnett Halt. It was linked by rail to Oxley, and the colliery at Baggeridge.

The halts and stations closed to passengers in 1932, and the entire line from Wolverhampton to Kingswinford was closed to freight traffic in the 1960s, although the stub near Pensnett Halt served the nearby Pensnett Trading Estate until 1994, when the entire stub to Kingswinford Junction was closed. Portions of the track remain in situ, however, as well as the platforms as far as Pensnett Halt. Gornal Halt has since been replaced by residential development, and Himley station now forms part of the South Staffordshire Railway Walk.

Today, the nearest active railway stations are in Wolverhampton and Stourbridge. When the West Midlands Metro extension from Wednesbury to Brierley Hill is completed, its nearest stops to Kingswinford will be Brierley Hill and Merry Hill.

In 2019, Pre Metro Operations (operators of the Stourbridge Town branch line) announced an ambition to reopen the South Staffordshire Line from Stourbridge to Merry Hill, with the possibility of reopening the Wombourne Branch Line to Pensnett, a mile away. Plans had previously been forestalled by the discovery of an ancient ant colony in the area designated for development.

== Media ==
Local news and television programmes are provided by BBC West Midlands and ITV Central. Television signals are received from either the Wrekin transmitting station or Sutton Coldfield transmitting station.

Local radio stations are:

- BBC Radio WM on 95.6 FM
- BBC Radio Shropshire on 96.0 FM
- Heart West Midlands on 100.7 FM
- Smooth West Midlands on 105.7 FM
- Greatest Hits Radio Birmingham & The West Midlands on 105.2 FM
- Greatest Hits Radio Black Country & Shropshire on 107.7 FM
- Capital Midlands on 102.2 FM
- Hits Radio Birmingham on 96.4 FM
- Hits Radio Black Country & Shropshire on 97.2 FM
- Black Country Radio, a community based station which broadcast to the town on 92.2 FM.

The town is served by the Express & Star, Stourbridge News and Dudley News newspapers.

== Education ==
Kingswinford serves 5–11 year olds with eight primary schools, one of which is a special school.

- Blanford Mere Primary School
- Bromley Hills Primary School
- Crestwood Park Primary School
- Dawley Brook Primary School
- Dingle Community Primary School
- Glynne Primary School
- St Mary's Church of England (VC) Primary School
- The Brier School (Special School)

Bromley Hills, the Brier School and secondary school, the Crestwood School, sit together on a site located on Bromley Lane, Kingswinford. They are part of a project that involves a standard primary school and a special educational needs (SEN) school, and a secondary school, which work closely with each other. The area known as Campus 21 has benefitted from investment including the building of the Brier School (SEN 5–19) and a new sports hall.

The area has three major secondary schools:

- Kingswinford Academy is located a five-minute walk from the main road that runs through Kingswinford, the A491 (Market Street).
- Summerhill School is located some half-mile away and has recently undergone major building works. Perhaps reflecting the area's emotion, it was rebuilt in 2003 with a brand new 21st century design replacing the original 1950s buildings. This project was one of the first large scale PFI projects (the deal was worth around £27 million) and is considered to be a showcase for the local authority's education provision. A remaining building from the old school that was built in 1993 was the subject of local debate since its closure in 2003, with Dudley Metropolitan Borough council intent upon using it to house the borough's archives. The council planned to move the archives service to this building in 2007, but the scheme was cancelled in 2008 after it was found to be uneconomical. The building was damaged, but not destroyed, in an arson attack on 5 November 2008, carried out by 2 current students at the time. It sat derelict for a while before being finally demolished.
- The Crestwood School is located on another hectic road through Kingswinford that joins the A491 (Market Street) to the Brierley Hill area, often used, to residents' dismay, as a fast way to Merry Hill Shopping Centre. The Crestwood School has recently also undergone major building works, which has seen the moving of the Brier school upon land between Crestwood (As known to locals) and Bromley Hills Primary School. This has also been seen as an inconvenience to local residents as it has brought extra traffic to an already busy road, especially at school run times.

== Notable people ==
- Edward Sutton, 5th Baron Dudley (1567–1643), owned the manor of Kingswinford and developed the local mining industry.
- George Saxby Penfold (1769–1846), Rector of Kingswinford 1831 to 1846, but held other livings as well.
- William Robertson Coe (1869–1955), insurance, railroad and business executive, emigrated to the US.
- Rob Jones (1964–1993), pop musician, founding member and original bassist for The Wonder Stuff
- Paul Barnett (born 1968), TV producer and director.
- Rebecca Hazlewood (born 1977), film and TV actress, brought up locally

In sport, Kingswinford has been home to:

- David Stokes (1880- ??) footballer, played 387 games for Bolton Wanderers F.C.
- Paul Pridgeon (born 1954), former cricketer who played 240 first-class matches
- Michael Rutter (born 1972 in Wordsley) nicknamed "The Blade", a British motorcycle racer.
- Richard Scott (born 1974), footballer who played over 320 games
- Adam Finch (born 2000), cricketer playing for Worcester County Cricket Club.
- Ben Healy (cyclist) (born 2000), Nationalized Irish cyclist.
