= Brierley Hill =

Town in the West Midlands, England

Coordinates: 52.4795°N 2.1245°W

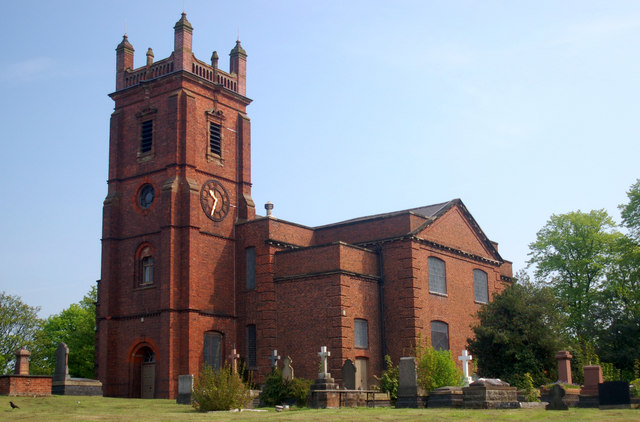
- St Michael's Church, Brierley Hill

- Location within the West Midlands
- Population: 13,935 (2011.Ward)
- OS grid reference: SO915868
- Metropolitan borough: Dudley
- Metropolitan county: West Midlands
- Region: West Midlands
- Country: England
- Sovereign state: United Kingdom
- Post town: BRIERLEY HILL
- Postcode district: DY5
- Dialling code: 01384
- Police: West Midlands
- Fire: West Midlands
- Ambulance: West Midlands
- UK Parliament: Dudley South

Brierley Hill is a town and electoral ward in the Metropolitan Borough of Dudley, West Midlands (originally in Staffordshire), England. It is located three miles (five kilometres) south of Dudley and one mile (1.5 kilometres) north of Stourbridge. Part of the Black Country and in a heavily industrialised area, it had a population of 13,935 at the 2011 census. It is best known for glass and steel manufacturing, although the industry has declined considerably since the 1970s. One of the largest factories in the area was the Round Oak Steelworks, which closed down and was redeveloped in the 1980s to become the Merry Hill Shopping Centre. Since 2008, Brierley Hill has been designated as the Strategic Town Centre of the Dudley Borough.

== Toponymy ==
The name Brierley Hill derives from the Old English words 'brer', meaning the place where the Briar Rose grew; 'leah', meaning a woodland clearing; and 'hill'.

== History ==
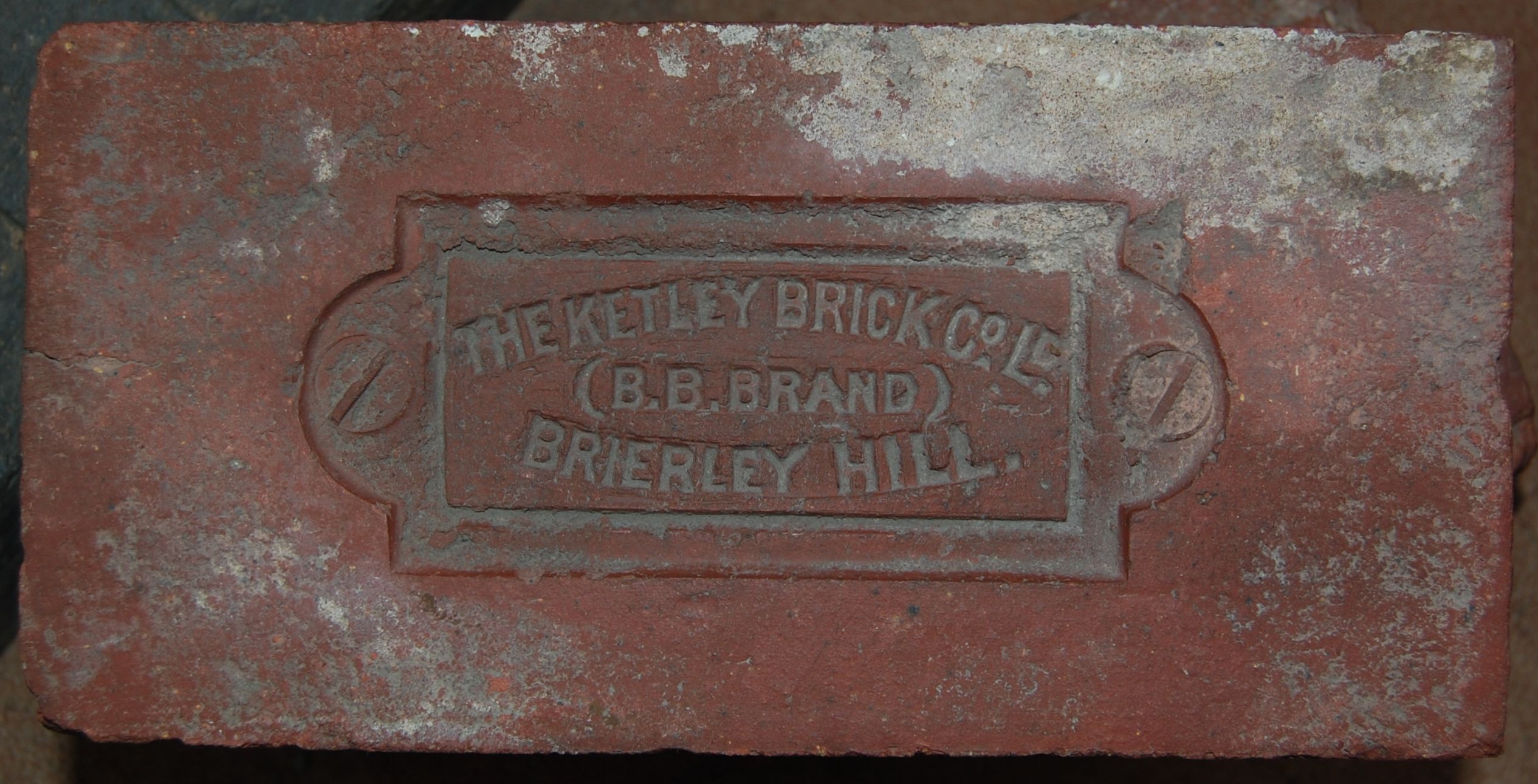
'B.B. Brand' brick made by The Ketley Brick Co. Ltd. of Brierley Hill, displayed at the Black Country Living Museum

Largely a product of the Industrial Revolution, Brierley Hill has a relatively recent history, with the first written records of the town dating back to the 17th century. Originally established as a settlement in the woodland of Pensnett Chase, it began expanding rapidly following the chase's enclosure in 1748; it was first recorded on a map in 1785 after the mapping of the Stourbridge Canal.

Brierley Hill had become heavily industrialised by the beginning of the 19th century, with several quarries, collieries, glass works and iron works emerging. Pigot and Co.'s National Commercial Directory for 1828-9 describes Brierley Hill as a hamlet with extensive iron works manufacturing rod, bar and sheet iron, tanks, and boilers.

A National School was opened in the town in 1835 and a market area had developed along the High Street.

By the start of the 20th century, the raw material deposits had become depleted, leading to the closure of many of the industries in the area. The decline in manufacturing resulted in an unemployment rate of 25% in Brierley Hill by the early 1980s, with the closure of the Round Oak Steelworks in December 1982 resulting in a further 1,300 redundancies. The steelworks site, along with the adjacent Merry Hill Farm, were subsequently designated as an Enterprise Zone and were redeveloped to create the Merry Hill Shopping Centre and The Waterfront business park.

In recent years, proposals have been drawn up by the local authority to regenerate Brierley Hill, with the Brierley Hill Regeneration Partnership formed to improve the town over 10 years, by investing in the infrastructure and increasing the number of homes and job opportunities.

Brierley Hill is home to the renowned Bathams brewery on Delph Road.

=== Civic history ===
Brierley Hill became a chapelry in the parish of Kingswinford, Staffordshire, on 31 December 1894. It became a separate civil parish, being formed from the part of Kingswinford parish in Brierley Hill urban district, under the Local Government Act 1894; previously, it had been an urban sanitary authority. The urban district expanded greatly in 1934, after taking in most of the Kingswinford and Quarry Bank districts and made a failed bid to obtain borough status in 1952. On 1 April 1966, the district was abolished and merged with the County Borough of Dudley, Seisdon Rural District, Municipal borough of Stourbridge; part also went to form the County Borough of Warley.

The parish was also abolished on 1 April 1966 and merged with Dudley and Stourbridge; part also went to form Warley. In 1961, the parish had a population of 56,075. It became part of the Dudley Metropolitan Borough in 1974.

== Governance ==
The town is part of the Dudley Metropolitan Borough, in the West Midlands. The Brierley Hill electoral ward is currently represented by one Labour councillor, Matthew Cook, and two Conservative councillors, Adam Davies and Wayne Little, on the borough council.

On a national level, the ward forms part of the Stourbridge constituency; the current MP is Cat Eccles of the Labour Party.

== Places of interest ==
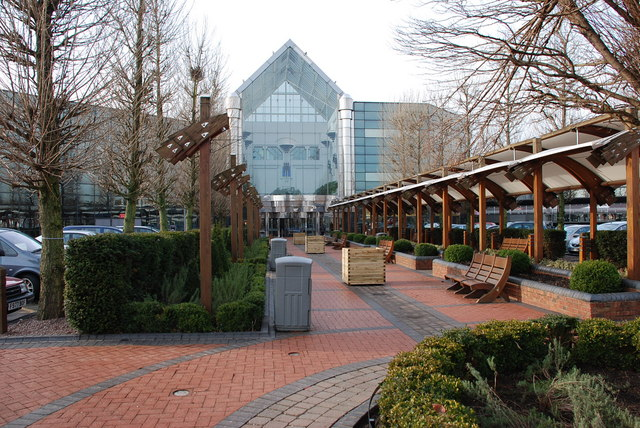
Merry Hill Shopping Centre

The Merry Hill Shopping Centre is located immediately east of Brierley Hill. One of the largest shopping centres in the UK, it was built between 1985 and 1989 on the grounds of Merry Hill Farm, the last working urban farm in the West Midlands.

Round Oak Steelworks was built in 1857 on land overlooking the site of what is now the Merry Hill Centre. It employed up to 3,000 people at its peak, but that figure had fallen to just over 1,200 by the time it closed in December 1982. The adjacent Waterfront office complex was built on the former steelworks site, being developed between 1989 and 1995, although since the Great Recession (2007–2009), around half of its office units have become empty, with an application for government-funded Enterprise Zone status rejected.

The original T. H. Baker store was on the High Street, central to the town since 1888; it closed in July 2018. The West Bromwich Building Society had intended to relocate to the Waterfront from its previous base in West Bromwich in 2012, although the plan was later shelved.

The art deco former Danilo Cinema opened on Dudley Road in December 1936, with an opening ceremony conducted by George Formby and the young Viscount Ednam, who stepped in when his father, the Earl of Dudley, arrived late.

Brierley Hill Civic Hall, situated on Bank Street in the town centre, hosted several of Slade's first concerts during the early 1970s, although none of the members were actually from Brierley Hill.

== Geography ==
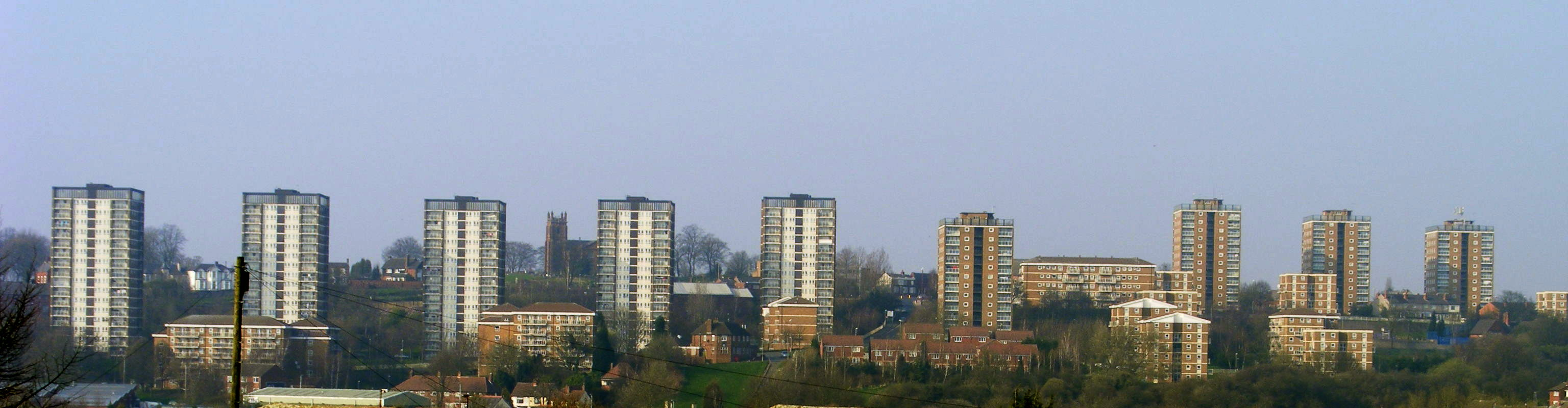
Brierley Hill flats

=== Amblecote ===
Amblecote is in the Stourbridge Constituency and became part of Brierley Hill postcode, because Stourbridge has a small postal sorting office and couldn’t keep up with demand when new housing was built on Peters Hill. Historically Amblecote, is part of Stourbridge ( Worcestershire )

=== Brockmoor ===
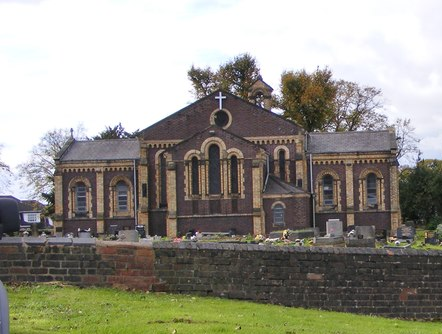
Church of St John, Brockmoor

Brockmoor is situated to the immediate north of the town centre. On the border with Wordsley was the Bottle and Glass Inn, erected on the bank of the Dudley Canal in about 1800 as The Bush. It remained here until 1980, when it was transferred to the Black Country Living Museum as a centrepiece of the then-new village.

St John's Church, Brockmoor, is Grade II listed. It was built in 1844–1845 to designs by Thomas Smith and was made predominantly using Staffordshire blue bricks.

It is also home to Brockmoor Primary School, which has existed at its current site in Belle Isle since 1994. The original school was built in the late 19th century, as an infant school for 5 to 7 year-olds and a junior school for 7 to 11 year-olds; it became a first school for 5–8 year-olds and a middle school for 8 to 12 year-olds in September 1972. However, the two schools merged in September 1989 to form Brockmoor Primary School and a year later the age range was altered to 5 to 11.

=== Pensnett ===
Pensnett is situated more than one mile (1.5 kilometres) of the town centre and borders the townships of Sedgley, Kingswinford and Dudley.

=== Withymoor Village ===
Withymoor Village and Lakeside lie to the south of the town centre bordering Stourbridge and were mostly developed in the 1970s and 1980s, following open cast coalmining. A Sainsbury's store is at the centre of the village. The estate is served by Diamond Bus service 142/142A.

=== Chapel Street Estate ===
Chapel Street Estate was developed during the 1960s with predominantly multi-storey flats on the site of a Victorian residential area.

Hundreds of terraced houses had been built on the site of Chapel Street during the 19th century, housing the many industrial workers who were being employed at new factories like the Round Oak Steel Works. But by the end of the Second World War, many of these houses were unfit for human habitation and plans were soon being made for their demolition.

By the end of the 1960s, all of the old houses in the area had been demolished and replaced by a new housing estate that consisted entirely of council flats.

=== Quarry Bank ===
Quarry Bank is situated to the southeast of the town centre and leads to the border with Cradley Heath and Stourbridge. It has a bustling village high street with many independent shops, Church and Stevens Park. Like Amblecote it is part of the Stourbridge constituency.

=== Hawbush Estate ===
Hawbush Estate stands one mile (1.5 kilometres) west of the town centre; it was developed in the late 1920s and early 1930s.

== Transport ==
Brierley Hill is sited along the main A461 road between Stourbridge and Dudley, with other roads providing connections to neighbouring locations. A bypass now diverts the road on a new alignment behind the Asda store rather than through the town centre.

The town is served by many bus routes, with a bus station situated at the Merry Hill Shopping Centre and several bus stops along the main High Street. Routes provide links to central Dudley, Halesowen, Stourbridge, Walsall, West Bromwich, Kidderminster and Wolverhampton.

The nearest station is Cradley Heath, over one mile (1.5 kilometres) southeast of the town. West Midlands Trains operates frequent services to Worcester Foregate Street, Worcester Shrub Hill, Kidderminster, Stratford-upon-Avon and Dorridge.

Between 1850 and 1962, Brierley Hill railway station served passengers on the Oxford-Worcester-Wolverhampton Line between Dudley Town and Stourbridge Junction. The section of line from Stourbridge to Brierley Hill is still in use for goods trains, with a railway steel terminal opening in 1986, but the line northbound to Dudley has been closed since 1993.

An extension to the West Midlands Metro will see the railway line north of Brierley Hill reopened, with light rail services providing a link to the existing Metro line in Wednesbury and Dudley to the north, with Stourbridge to the south.

== Public services ==
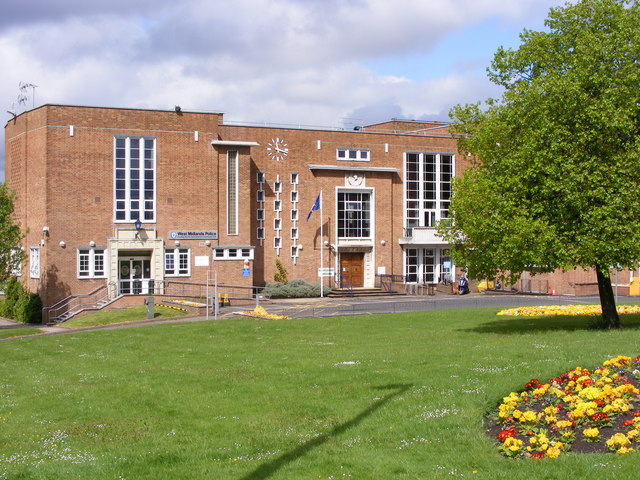
Brierley Hill Police Station

West Midlands Police have their main Dudley area station in Brierley Hill, situated on the corner of Bank Street, next to the Civic Hall. The police station was originally built in the 1960s as the future local council offices, but the plan was scrapped when Brierley Hill became a part of the Dudley Borough.

There is also a fire station located on Dudley Road, with fire and rescue services provided by the West Midlands Fire Service.

== Media ==
Local news and television programmes are provided by BBC West Midlands and ITV Central. Television signals are received from the Sutton Coldfield TV transmitter and the local relay transmitter.

Local radio stations are BBC Radio WM, BBC Radio Shropshire, Heart West Midlands, Smooth West Midlands, Greatest Hits Radio Birmingham & The West Midlands, Capital Midlands, Hits Radio Birmingham, Hits Radio Black Country & Shropshire and Black Country Radio, a community based station which broadcast from the town.

The town is served by the local newspaper, Dudley News.

== Education ==
The town currently has 10 primary schools and one secondary school. Thorns Community College and The Crestwood School are now the town's only secondary schools, due to the closure of Pensnett High School.

Brierley Hill runs a system of infant (ages 5 to 7), junior (7 to 11) and secondary schools (11 to 16), in line with the rest of the Dudley borough and the majority of schools in other areas.

=== Primary schools ===
- Brierley Hill
- Brockmoor
- Crestwood Park
- Hawbush
- Mount Pleasant
- Quarry Bank
- St Mark's
- St Mary's RC
- Bromley-Pensnett
- Thorns
- Withymoor
- Peters Hill
- Thorns.

=== Secondary schools ===
- Thorns Collegiate Academy
- Pensnett High School, closed in July 2010, stayed open until July 2012 as a learning centre for the oldest two age groups in the school. It has since been demolished apart from a special school, Pens Meadow School, which occupies part of the site.

== Religion ==
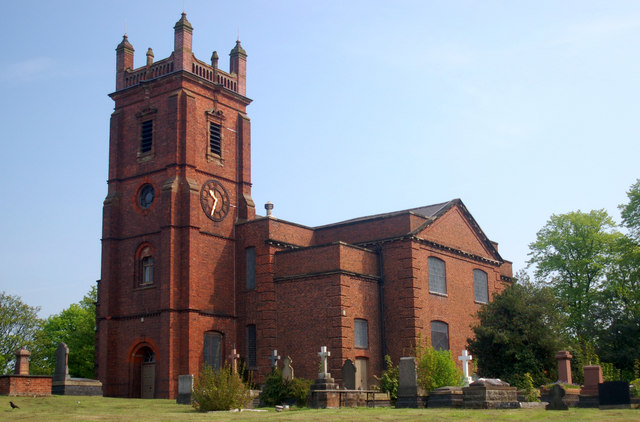
St. Michael's Church, Brierley Hill

The first religious building in Brierley Hill was St. Michael's Chapel, which was constructed in 1765 by public subscription. It became a parish church in 1842, covering the areas of Brockmoor, Delph, and Quarry Bank. In 1872, construction commenced on St. Mary's Catholic Church. Designed by E. W. Pugin, it was completed in 1873; upon completion, it consisted of a nave, sanctuary, aisle and side chapel. There are also Methodist and Baptist churches in the town.

There is also a Chinese Buddhist temple located in Brierley Hill, to cater for the Buddhist community of the Dudley Borough.

Brierley Hill War Memorial lies outside St. Michael's.

== Notable residents ==
- John Corbett (1817–1901), industrialist, nicknamed The Salt King.
- Anthony Clarke Booth (1846–1899 in Brierley Hill), recipient of the Victoria Cross for service during the Zulu War.
- Don Richardson (1930–2007), developed the Merry Hill Shopping Centre, more than 50 years after being born close by.
- Trevor Smith (1936–2003), former footballer, played 365 games for Birmingham City.
- Danny Batth (born 1990), footballer, played over 570 games including 195 for Wolves.

== See also ==
- Royal Brierley (glass makers)
