= Amblecote =

Village in the West Midlands, England

Coordinates: 52.46°N 02.16°W

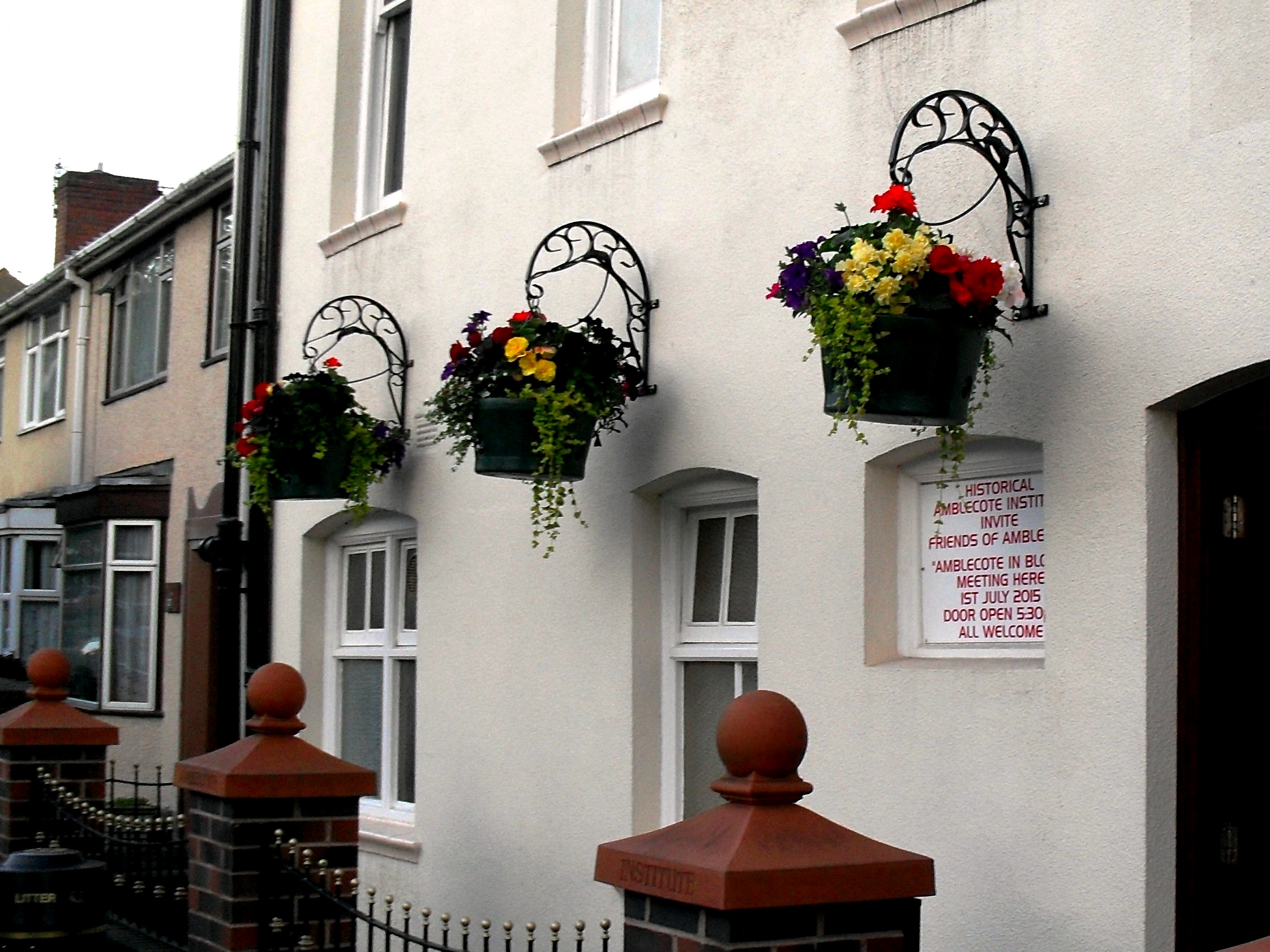
- Amblecote in bloom

- Location within the West Midlands
- Population: 13,393 (2011.Ward)
- OS grid reference: SO8985
- Metropolitan borough: Dudley
- Metropolitan county: West Midlands
- Region: West Midlands
- Country: England
- Sovereign state: United Kingdom
- Post town: BRIERLEY HILL
- Postcode district: DY5
- Post town: STOURBRIDGE
- Postcode district: DY8
- Dialling code: 01384
- Police: West Midlands
- Fire: West Midlands
- Ambulance: West Midlands
- UK Parliament: Stourbridge

Amblecote is a village in the Metropolitan Borough of Dudley in the West Midlands, England and was in the ancient Domesday book. It lies immediately north of the historic town of Stourbridge on the southwestern edge of the West Midlands conurbation. Historically, Amblecote was in the parish of Oldswinford, but unlike the rest of the parish (which was in Worcestershire) it was in Staffordshire, and as such was administered separately. It borders Audnam, Quarry Bank and Wollaston.

== History ==
Emelecote is mentioned in the Domesday Book. In 1066, there were two tenants farming on behalf of their over-lord Earl Algar. In 1086, the tenant was William son of Ansculf whilst the hamlet was owned by Payne of Hoggeston. There were four villager householders, two smallholdings and one slave family. There were two ploughlands farmed by two men's plough teams, and four acres of meadows. The value of Amblecote remained at 10 shillings.

By the twelfth century the lordship was held by the Birminghams, who were Lords of Dudley. Early in the thirteenth century the village was held for knight's service by Robert de Wavere. He was succeeded by Cecily de Stafford, Lady of Amblecote in 1255. The manor was held by tenants named William de Stafford in 1284–5, 1290, and in 1316. In 1317 Sir William de Stafford gave it to his grandson James son of William de Stafford, who held it until 1322, when he forfeited it as a rebel against King Edward 11. It was granted by the king to John de Somery. Although he was pardoned in October 1322, the manor of Amblecote is not mentioned again until 1338 as being in the families ownership. A legal case followed in 1377, against a cousin Thomas de Erdeswick, but the rights of Humphrey de Stafford to the manor were asserted. In 1413, the manor passed to his son Humphrey, then in 1442 to the latter's granddaughter, Amice, who later became Countess of Wiltshire. Her nephew Humphrey de Stafford then inherited the manor and upon his death in 1461 his cousin, William became lord.

During the War of the Roses, the ownership of Amblecote frequently changed. Sir Humphrey Stafford was created Lord Stafford of Southwick in 1464 and Earl of Devon in 1469 by King Edward IV. Shortly afterwards he refused to assist the Earl of Pembroke in suppressing Sir John Conyers' rebellion, and was beheaded and attainted on 24 August 1469. His lands were forfeited, but on 9 November the king agreed that his heirs would take possession of all his estates. As he died without issue, these heirs were the daughters of his aunt Alice Stafford, namely, Elizabeth, who married Sir John Coleshill and died without issue, Anne, who married Sir John Willoughby, and Eleanor, who became the wife of Thomas Strangways. Their Cousin, Humphrey Stafford of Grafton, disagreed with this decision citing the settlement of 1413, took the profits from Amblecote and stayed until he was removed in 1473 by Anne's son, Robert Willoughby de Broke. In 1482, the Erdeswick claim to the Manor of Amblecote was finally settled for 1000 marks (£666). Richard III (1483-5) returned Amblecote to Humphrey Stafford, but Henry VII restored the estates to Robert Willoughby, Elizabeth Coleshill and Eleanor Strangways. The latter's son, Giles, died in 1504 and the manor was inherited by his son Sir Giles Strangways.

In 1540, he sold Amblecote to Rowland Shakerley, who conveyed it later that year to Thomas Grey. In 1559, his son inherited, and in 1590 his infant niece Mary would be bequested Amblecote if she agreed to marry either Henry, son of Sir George Grey of Pirgoe, co. Essex, or one of his brothers, Ambrose and George. If this marriage did not take place the manor was to go to Henry, Ambrose and George successively, and £1,000 was to be paid to Mary. The Manor of Amblecote was held in trust by Henry Grey and from 1595 his brother Edward. (fn. 102) In March 1601 Mary, then aged about fourteen, expressed her determination not to marry any of the three brothers and instead married William Stanley of Bromwich. In 1614, Sir Henry Grey's surviving son, Ambrose, inherited until 1636; then to his son Henry. In 1652, Amblecote was leased to Anne Gerrard for ninety-nine years.

A water-mill belonged to the manor of Amblecote in 1636. A mill at Amblecote is mentioned in deeds of 1663, 1680 and 1688.

Amblecote was formerly a chapelry in the parish of Old Swinford, which was otherwise in Worcestershire. It was a separate division for rating purposes from those Stourbridge and Oldswinford (the two Worcestershire divisions of the parish). Since rates were separately collected for it, it became a civil parish in 1866. In 1894, under the Local Government Act 1894, the parish of Amblecote became part of Kingswinford Rural District, but became an urban district by itself in 1898. The urban district council of Amblecote used to meet in the former "Fish Inn" public house which is now a Chinese restaurant and historic relics of this time remain at the building, such as the civic clock. This civic clock has recently been restored and opened up by Pat Martin, ward councillor in 2009. Amblecote was divided between the County Borough of Dudley and the Municipal Borough of Stourbridge and Brierley Hill Urban District on 1 April 1966, with the area to the east of the railway line becoming part of Brierley Hill and the remainder part of Stourbridge. This is reflected in the area's postcodes being split between the DY5 and DY8 postal districts. On 1 April 1966 the parish was abolished and merged with Stourbridge and Dudley. In 1961 the parish had a population of 3,009.

In 1974, under the Local Government Act, the entirety of Amblecote became part of the Metropolitan Borough of Dudley, in the new West Midlands county.

From the 17th century, following the arrival of Huguenot migrants to the area, Amblecote became home to a number of glassworks, including Thomas Webb and Dennis Hall. Together with the adjoining village of Wordsley, it formed the main centre of the Stourbridge glass industry, now known as "The Glass Quarter". Glass is still produced to this day, in albeit much-reduced quantities following the deindustrialisation of the area in the 1980s and 1990s which saw the closure of many of the larger companies.

Other important industries included:

- Coal and fire clay mining, especially in the north-east of the village
- Fire brick and house brick manufacturing (George King Harrison & Co., William King and Co and Pearsons)
- Ironworks, particularly the Stourbridge Ironworks of John Bradley & Co, which included the engineering works of Foster, Rastrick and Company, which made the Stourbridge Lion, the first train to run on American railways and the Agenoria, another important early locomotive.
- Davits and ship equipment

Agriculture continued well into the 20th century. The ancient Manor House of Amblecote Hall went back to Norman times, and had a farm attached to it. The Hall was probably rebuilt, and perhaps relocated, several times over the intervening centuries, the last Hall was lived in by a number of prominent people throughout the 18th and 19th centuries. The Gittins family lived there until the Hall was demolished in 1952 due to mining subsidence. The farm disappeared when the whole area to the east of the Western Fault was open cast mined to extract the coal in the mid-1960s.

The parish church of Holy Trinity was begun in 1841, and the church completed in 1842 and consecrated in 1844, being made a separate ecclesiastical parish (a perpetual curacy) in 1845 and then a vicarage in 1868. Amblecote Parish Church of the Holy Trinity is almost unique (as is nearby Quarry Bank Church) because it is constructed completely of yellow fire bricks, made by local brickworks (William King and Co) from the local fire clay which, together with thick coal seams, forms the main strata of Amblecote in the east, whilst the new red sandstone underlies Amblecote to the west of the railway line. Local benefactors, such as the Foster Rasterick Ironworks, supplied the iron railings around the perimeter of the church and Amblecote was one of few to retain these railings following World War II when many churches did not keep them.

Amblecote was the location up until 2007 of the Corbett Hospital, presented to the local people by the local-born (at The Delph) businessman John Corbett. He made his fortune from extracting brine to make salt in his works at Stoke Prior near Droitwich, and who became known as the 'Salt King'. John Corbett visited France extensively in the course of his business, and in Paris he met and wed Anna O'Meara, daughter of an Irish father and French mother. He purchased the Impney Estate, just outside Droitwich Spa, and built a chateau-styled mansion to try to assuage her home-sickness. "The Chateau Impney" was finished in 1875 and cost £247,000 to build. In 1893 he gave "The Hill" to the local people of Amblecote in perpetuity as a hospital, to augment the dispensary in Stourbridge Town Centre, which still remains on the junction of New Road and Worcester Street, which had been the mainstay of local public health before this time. Corbett Hospital was much extended over the years and catered for all hospital functions, becoming a general hospital. It was allowed to become run down in the mid-1980s, as a new hospital Russells Hall Hospital was built in Dudley to cater for all health-care issues in the Dudley MBC area. The Corbett Hospital was mostly demolished in 2006 and replaced with a new out-patients centre containing a range of services, as well as a children's and family centre.

== Modern expansion ==
Located within Amblecote is the War Memorial Athletic Ground, home of Stourbridge Football Club (nicknamed the Glassboys) and Stourbridge Cricket Club. Amblecote Cricket Club used to play on land off Church Avenue (now Cricketer's Green estate), to the rear of the Parish Church, before the land was sold to Hassall Homes for housing in the mid-1980s. Before this, the club used to play on part of Peters Hill, Amblecote Bank, just down from the Birch Tree Inn, towards Stourbridge, until the early 1980s when it was sold to Tarmac Homes who constructed the Broomhill Estate. Amblecote Cricket Club is still in existence and after a period of around 20 years playing at Dudley Kingswinford Rugby Club, their base is now at the Marsh Playing Fields in nearby Kinver. Due to the construction of massive new housing estates, the existing primary school at Amblecote was too small to cope with the influx of new residents. Many residents' children on the Stourview Estate had to attend schools some distance away, such as Thorns Primary. In 1974, the County Borough of Dudley responded by constructing the new Peters Hill Primary School, which rapidly expanded eventually accommodating some 950 children.

Some of the northern part of Amblecote High Street was demolished in the early 1990s to make way for a major road widening scheme.

Housing developments constructed between the 1960s and 1990s in Amblecote
Estate	Developer	Construction period
Stourview	A&J Mucklow and Company	1960s
Stourvale	A&J Mucklow and Company	1970s/80s
Quincy Rise	William Whittingham and Company	1980s
Lemonshawe	Tarmac Homes	1980s
Clent View	Midland and General Limited	1980s
Broomhill	Tarmac Homes	1980s
Stourcroft Park/Tiffany Circle	Midland and General Limited	1980s
Tudor Hill	Tarmac Homes	1980s
Lakeside/Tudor Meadows	Bovis Homes	1980s/1990s
The Ridgeway	Tarmac Homes	1980s
Beechwood Park	Tarmac Homes	1980s
Fox Hollow	Tarmac Homes	1980s
The Parklands	Midland and General Homes	1980s
Ravensitch and Ravens Park	Maxim Homes	1970s/80s

These developments, coupled with the nearby Withymoor Village development (classed as part of Brierley Hill), added almost 8,000 new homes between 1964 and 1998 on land formerly used for farming and rehabilitated former coal and fire clay mines, both bell pits and open cast mines, which completely changed the face of the area, and brick works which closed down. Many of the new homes were family dwellings, which saw the rapid expansion especially of Peters Hill Primary School, which more than quadrupled in size from around 200 when opened to over 800 on completion.

The development also changed Amblecote's nature as a settlement, from a clearly defined ancient village separated from Quarry Bank and Stourbridge by fields and pit workings etc. to a coalesced settlement, looking more like a suburban development and the development joined Stourbridge and Brierley Hill for the first time ever and Amblecote became the largest electoral ward in Dudley Borough, with a Conservative leaning, under first Dudley West and then Stourbridge constituencies. In boundary changes in 2004 Stourbridge North was created which took half of Amblecote Ward.

== Notable residents ==
- John Corbett, owner of the Hill and founder of the Corbett Hospital; salt merchant and future Droitwich MP and owner of the Chateau Impney
- James Foster, ironmaster whose firm Foster, Rastrick and Company made the Stourbridge Lion steam locomotive, the first of which ever to run in the US and now in the Smithson Museum and its sister locomotive, the Agenoria.
- Edward Lindsay Ince FRSE, mathematician, born and raised here
- Jan O. Pedersen, Danish Speedway rider (formerly of Cradley)
