= Earl of Dudley's Railway =

Railway line in the UK

Coordinates: 52°28′49″N 2°07′51″W

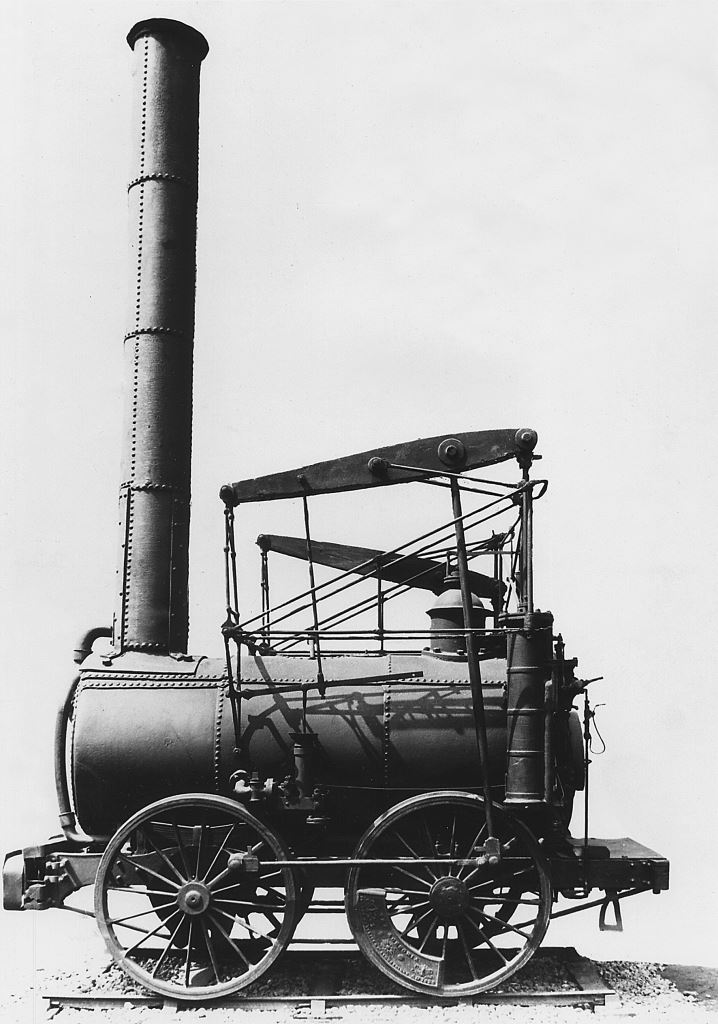
Locomotive Agenoria built by Foster, Rastrick and Company in Stourbridge for the Earl of Dudley’s Railway

The Earl of Dudley’s Railway or Pensnett Railway, was a 4 ft 8 1/2 in (1,435 mm) standard gauge railway that developed from a single 3-mile (4.8 km) line opened in 1829 to, at its maximum extent, a 40-mile (64 km) long network around the Earl of Dudley’s Iron Works at Round Oak near Brierley Hill.

== History ==
=== Origins ===
In the 19th century, the Ward family, owners of Dudley Castle, had large holdings of land in the Black Country region of England. They had added to their possessions in the 18th century by the enclosure of Pensnett Chase which had formerly been common land and, much further back in time, a hunting ground for the Barons of Dudley. Much of this land covered coal seams and deposits of industrial material including iron ore and fire-clay. Canals had been cut into the Black Country region in the second half of the 18th century but not all were conveniently close to the mines of the Dudley Estate. It was therefore decided to construct a railway linking coal mines near Shut End to a purpose-built canal basin at Ashwood on the Staffordshire and Worcestershire Canal, a distance of around 3 miles (4.8 km).

=== The Kingswinford Railway ===
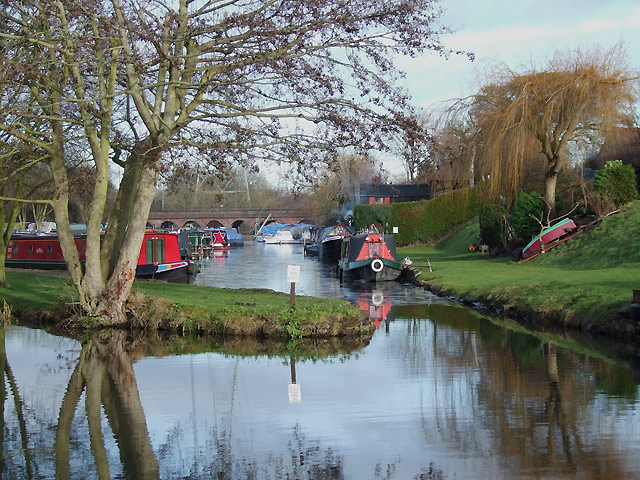
Ashwood canal basin. Originally built to transport coal from the Kingswinford Railway

An agreement to construct a rail line was signed in 1827 by James Foster, a local ironmaster, and Francis Downing, the mineral agent of John William Ward, the 4th Viscount Dudley and Ward, soon to become the 1st Earl of Dudley. James Foster (1786-1853) controlled the company John Bradley & Co a large industrial concern that owned the Stourbridge Iron Works. In 1823 John Bradley & Co., had taken a lease of land at Shut End, Kingswinford from J.H.H. Foley. In addition to John Bradley & Co., James Foster was also involved with the engineer John Urpeth Rastrick and, in 1819, they formed the company Foster Rastrick & Co. Rastrick had experience of steam engine construction and railway engineering.

The line opened on 2 June 1829 with the steam locomotive Agenoria purpose-built to haul wagons of coal from pits to the canal basin. The railway crossed land either owned by the Dudley Estate or leased by James Foster. The line was known as the Kingswinford Railway although sometimes it was called the Shutt (or Shut) End Railway. It was a standard gauge line set on stone blocks. From the Ashwood canal basin, the line ran up an incline for around 500 yards before reaching a level section which extended for around 2 miles. The line then tilted upwards again for a second incline to the vicinity of Shut End. A short level section brought it to its termination at Corbyn's Hall collieries. Agenoria only had sufficient power to pull carriages along the level section of the line. The two inclines were worked by self-acting mechanisms where loaded coal wagons moving down the slope pulled empty wagons uphill. The locomotive, constructed by Foster Rastrick & Co of Stourbridge ran for in excess of three decades. After a period of neglect, it was eventually donated to the Science Museum in South Kensington in 1885 and is now on display at the National Railway Museum in York.

=== The Pensnett Railway ===
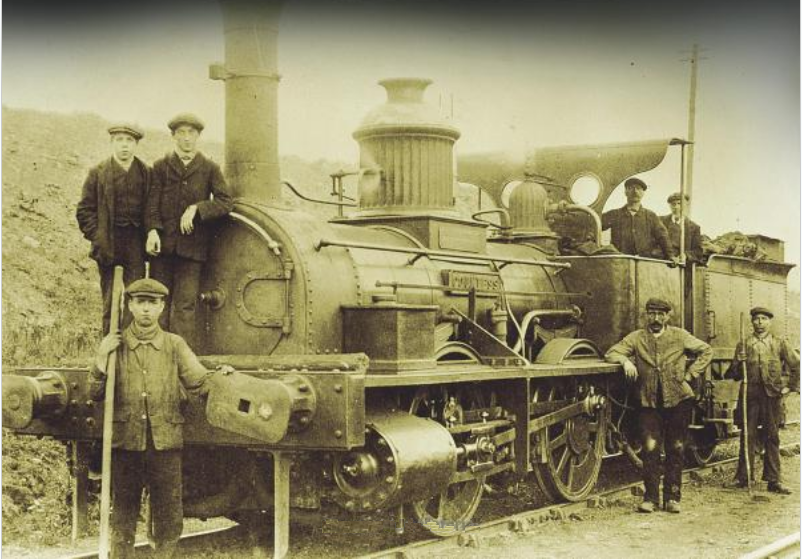
0-4-0 tender locomotive Countess delivered by Manning Wardle in 1859 to the Earl of Dudley’s Railway a.k.a. Pensnett Railway

In 1843 a consultant, F. P. Mackelcan, was hired by the Dudley estate to produce plans for further rail lines. A contractor, William Hughes, was hired to put a modified version of these plans into practice between 1844 and 1845. These new lines, in service in 1846, were known as the Pensnett Railway and were built to service local mines, factories, furnaces and transport hubs. The lines, roughly centred on the Level New Furnaces at Brierley Hill ran north to Barrow Hill, north-east to High Lanes (in the direction of Dudley) and south to Nine Locks. The incline at Barrow Hill was so steep that a stationary engine had to be installed to work the line on the slope.

In 1852 the Oxford, Worcester and Wolverhampton Railway opened their route to Dudley. The line crossed the Pensnett Railway at Round Oak, the crossing being made on the level. This crossing, at a near right angle, became a well known feature of the railway. Also in the early 1850s, an extension was made to the Pensnett system to the south-east to service collieries at Saltwells in Netherton. In 1855, the Dudley Estate opened the Round Oak Ironworks next to the Level New Furnaces in the centre of the Pensnett railway network.

In 1865, the Pensnett Railway was connected to the Kingswinford Railway, so that the original line, built in 1829, was connected to the network. Also in 1865 the line to High Lanes was extended to Dudley where a land sale wharf was built at Wellington Road. Coal was sent to the wharf by rail to be collected by coal merchants and distributed by road. The railway line though long closed was recalled for many years by a local business called Great Western Windows based in Wellington Road.

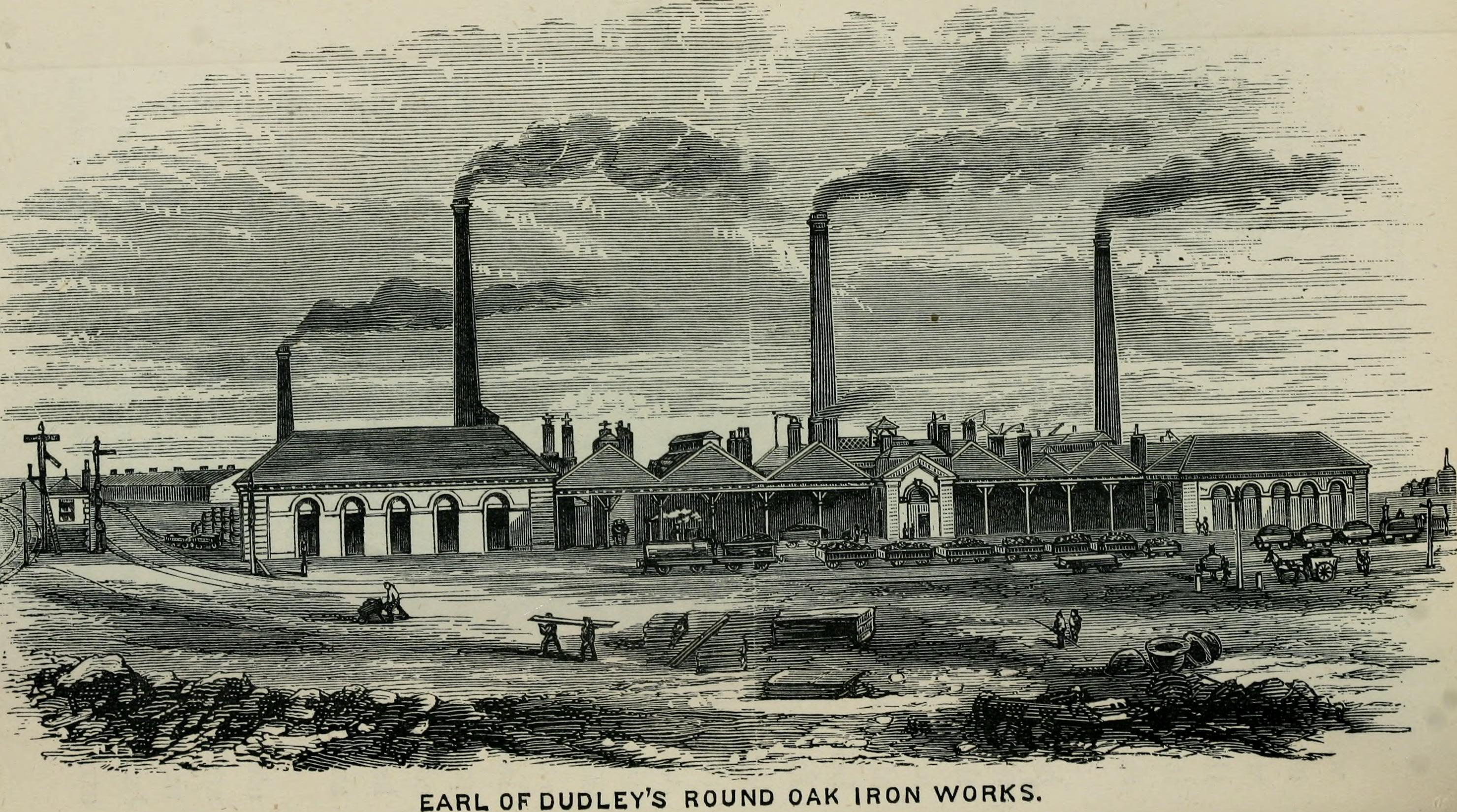
The Round Oak Ironworks in the 1870s. The Pensnett Railway runs in front of the factory. To the left is the signal box controlling the crossing and junction with the GWR line.

The network achieved its maximum extent in the 1870s when it included nearly 40 miles (64 km) of track. At this point it stretched to Himley in the north, Dudley in the north-east, Ashwood Basin in the west, Cradley Station in the south and Old Hill to the south-east. In 1876 a report was made into the state of the railway by Rupert Smith. It was calculated that the total length of line was 39.366 miles. Three connections with the GWR mainline had been made by this date: at Round Oak, Cradley (later renamed Cradley Heath) Station and at Askew Bridge. The report noted that there were 576 crossings, one turntable, 4 locomotive running sheds, and eleven locomotives 'exclusive of the old Pershore.' At the end of 1876 a total of 137 men were employed by the railway as well as 15 boys.

In 1885 some of the original land leases obtained by James Foster in order to build the Kingswinford Railway were set to expire. James' successor at John Bradley & Co., W. O. Foster, decided that the link to the Ashwood Basin was no longer necessary for his Shut End works, which were by then connected to the canal and mainline rail network. It was then arranged for the Dudley Estate to take over the Foster leases, which included the Ashwood Basin itself.

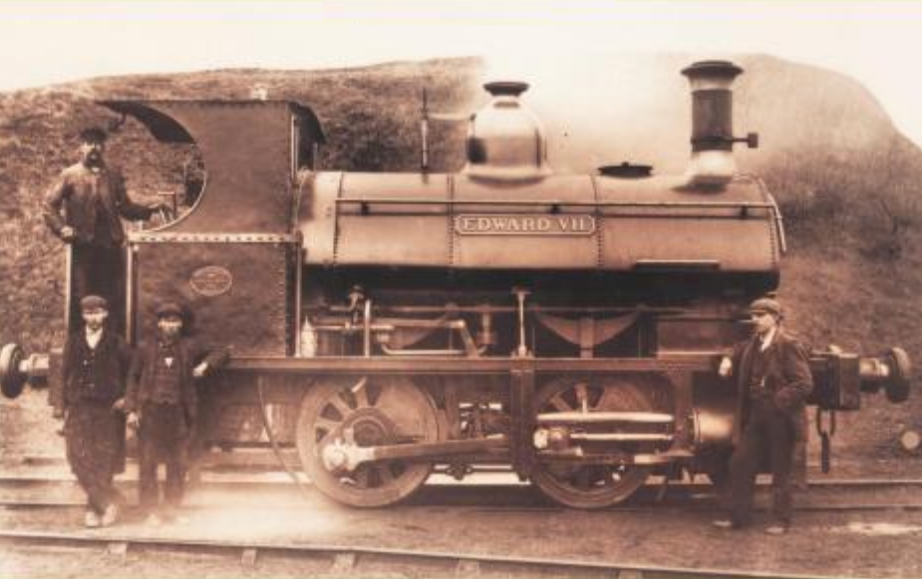
0-4-0ST steam locomotive Edward VII built at the Earl of Dudley's Castle Mill Works in 1902

The final major development of the network came when the Dudley estate developed a large coal mine at Baggeridge near the Earl of Dudley's Himley Park. The line to the colliery was constructed by the GWR in 1907 starting from Askew Bridge on the Pensnett Railway. Although the GWR built it, the branch was owned and operated by the Pensnett Railway. The mine went into production in 1912.

Although the railway was a mineral line, passengers were carried from 1928 until 1937 to the annual fetes at Himley Park. For the first year, passengers were carried in converted mineral waggons. However, from 1929, proper passenger carrying carriages were hired from the GWR. The route started at Wallows Shed, which was a repair facility for locomotives near the end of Lord Ward's Canal, included an intermediate stop at Barrow Hill and ended at Himley Park, a distance of 3.5 miles.

=== Post Second World War ===
The years immediately after the Second World War brought great changes to the Pensnett Railway. Some of the pits served by the line were nearly exhausted of minerals and so some branches of the railway had little traffic. In 1952 the tracks were lifted in the Saltwells area. In 1953 most of the line to the Ashwood basin (i.e. the original Kingswinford Railway) was closed. In the same year Wellington Wharf at Dudley closed, its track being lifted the following year. Diesel locomotives were introduced into the system in the 1950s, steam power being last used in 1963. The final remaining short section of track became the property of the Round Oak Steelworks, which itself closed in 1982.

== Locomotives ==
The Pensnett Railway employed many different locomotives during its long history. As already mentioned, the first of these was the Agenoria, built in 1829. This locomotive worked the near-level stretch of the line between Shut End and the top of the incline above the Ashwood canal basin but was not powerful enough to manage the two inclines on the line. A letter from the mineral agent of the Dudley Estate to W.O. Foster implied that the locomotive was not running on the line in April 1864 although it is not clear whether it was a temporary or permanent stoppage. Shortly afterwards, W.O. Foster's agent wrote back agreeing to provide a new engine as part of an agreement to improve the railway. The new locomotive was delivered to Foster's company John Bradley & Co. in 1865. It is generally assumed that Agenoria was abandoned around this time.

When the new lines were built in the mid 1840s the Dudley Estate obtained an engine or engines to work the lines (a locomotive driver was engaged in 1846) but no details are available of the type or the manufacturer. The first locomotive to run on the railway after Agenoria, of which anything is known, was the Alma, supplied in 1855 by E.B. Wilson of the Railway Foundry in Leeds. Subsequently, the Leeds manufacturer Manning Wardle became a favoured locomotive supplier up to the close of the 19th century. This company provided several locomotives to the railway including Brandon (1859), Himley (1859), Victory (1863), and Ednam (1872).

In the first half of the 20th century many locomotives were obtained from Scottish manufacturer Andrew Barclay including Viceroy (1903), Billy (1925), George V (1930), Lady Edith II (1941) and Lady Rosemary II (1941).

A few locomotives were also obtained from Peckett and Sons including Lady Edith (1900), Lady Morvyth (1921) and Lady Rosemary (1921).

From 1955 to 1962, 10 diesel locomotives were obtained from the Yorkshire Engine Company. These engines were given numbers rather than names. A final diesel locomotive was obtained second-hand in 1969.

== Remains ==
A short piece of track is still visible at the Round Oak Steel Terminal but the steel works and the pits have been demolished. Some trackbeds have become footpaths, while others have disappeared completely.
