= Foster, Rastrick and Company =

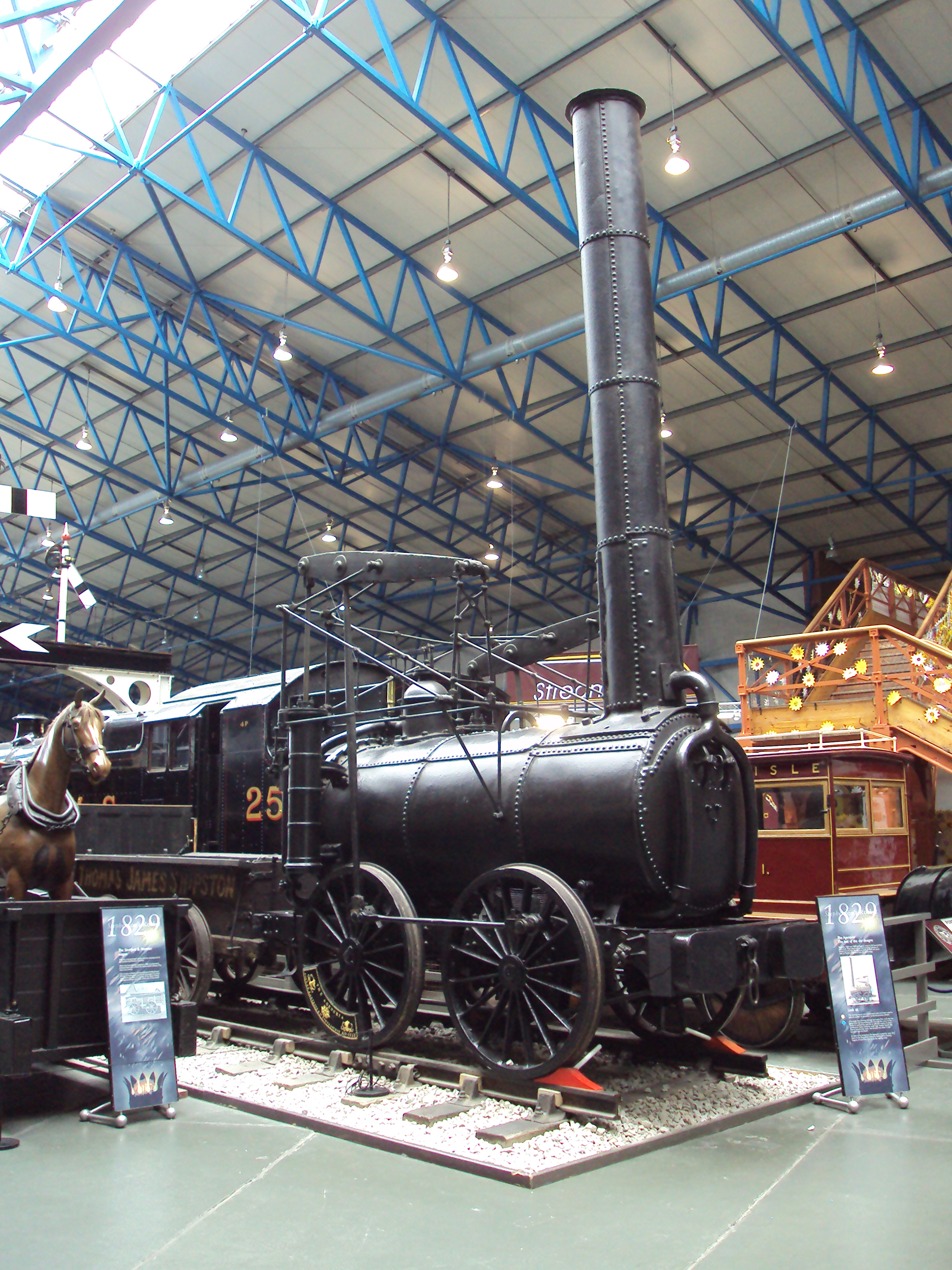
- Preserved Foster, Rastrick and Company steam locomotive Agenoria at the National Railway Museum, York
- Type: Partnership
- Industry: Engineering
- Founded: Midsummer 1819
- Founders: James Foster, John Urpeth Rastrick
- Defunct: 20 June 1831
- Fate: Dissolved
- Headquarters: Stourbridge, England
- Products: Machinery, structural materials, locomotives

Foster, Rastrick and Company was one of the pioneering steam locomotive manufacturing companies of England. It was based in Stourbridge, Worcestershire, now West Midlands. James Foster, an ironmaster, and John Urpeth Rastrick, an engineer, became partners in 1816, forming the company in 1819. Rastrick was one of the judges at the Rainhill Trials in 1829. The company was dissolved on 20 June 1831.

== Origins ==
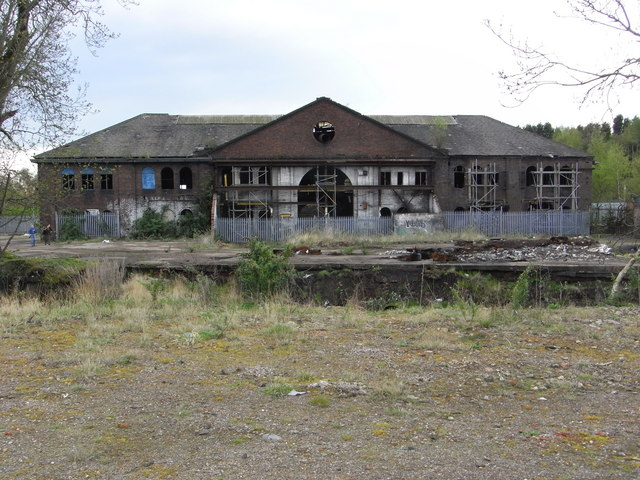
Foster, Rastrick & Company were based at the purpose-built New Foundry, Stourbridge, constructed in 1821 and here shown in a derelict state before conversion into a health centre

James Foster was the half-brother of John Bradley who founded the company John Bradley & Co, taking a lease on land near the canal at Stourbridge in 1800 with the aim of developing an ironworks. The deed of partnership for the company was drawn up in 1802 which granted a share in the company to Bradley's six half-brothers and sisters. By 1813 only John Bradley and James Foster had shares in the company and on Bradley's death in 1816, James Foster took control of the enterprise, which included the Stourbridge Iron Works.

John Urpeth Rastrick was an engineer born in 1780 at Morpeth in Northumberland. After finishing an apprenticeship with his father, which included work on steam engines, he worked first at the Ketley Ironworks and subsequently worked in partnership with John Hazledine of Bridgnorth. In 1808 he constructed a locomotive for Richard Trevithick and subsequently constructed a bridge at Chepstow (opened 1816). Shortly afterwards (1817) Rastrick left the partnership with Hazledine's company and moved to West Bromwich.

In June 1819 Rastrick and James Foster agreed to form the firm Foster, Rastrick & Company at a site next to the Stourbridge Iron Works. A new foundry was constructed from 1820-1821 to produce products for the partnership.

== Products ==
The company produced a variety of engineering products including steam engines, proving machines for chain cable, saws, mills, and boilers. It also produced structural components for buildings, bridges and gas works. It had the facilities to produce cast industrial components including beams, cylinders and flywheels as well as some household items. In 1825 it listed railway components in a catalogue of products including rail, railway sleepers and railway chairs.

== Locomotives ==
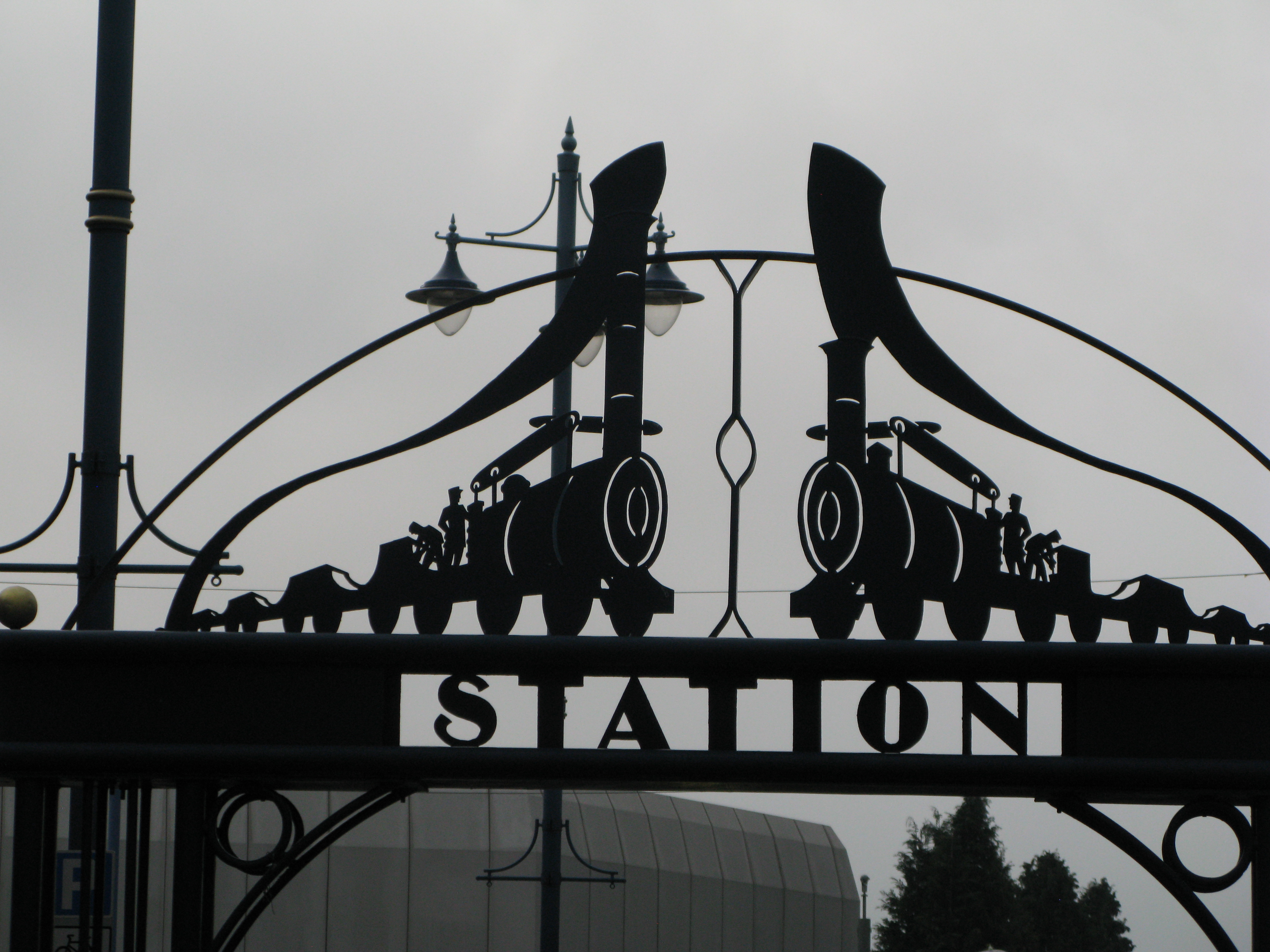
Foster, Rastrick and Company's locomotives commemorated in a sculpture above the subway leading to Stourbridge Town Station

At the end of the 1820s, Foster, Rastrick and Company produced steam locomotives intended for two railways: one in the USA and one just a few miles from the works at Stourbridge. The local opportunity had arisen after an agreement between James Foster and Francis Downing, the mineral agent of John William Ward, the 4th Viscount Dudley and Ward. The parties agreed to build a three-mile railway linking coal mines in the Shut End area with a purpose-built canal basin at Ashwood on the Staffordshire and Worcestershire Canal. In America, at about the same time, the Delaware and Hudson Canal Company were developing a rail and canal link between coal mines at Carbondale and the Hudson River. The Foster, Rastrick and Company built only four steam locomotives (each one having vertical cylinders, placed at the back and each side of the furnace, with grasshopper beams and connecting-rods from them to the crankpins in the four coupled wheels). Three were sent to America and one to the Kingswinford Railway in the Black Country.

=== For America ===
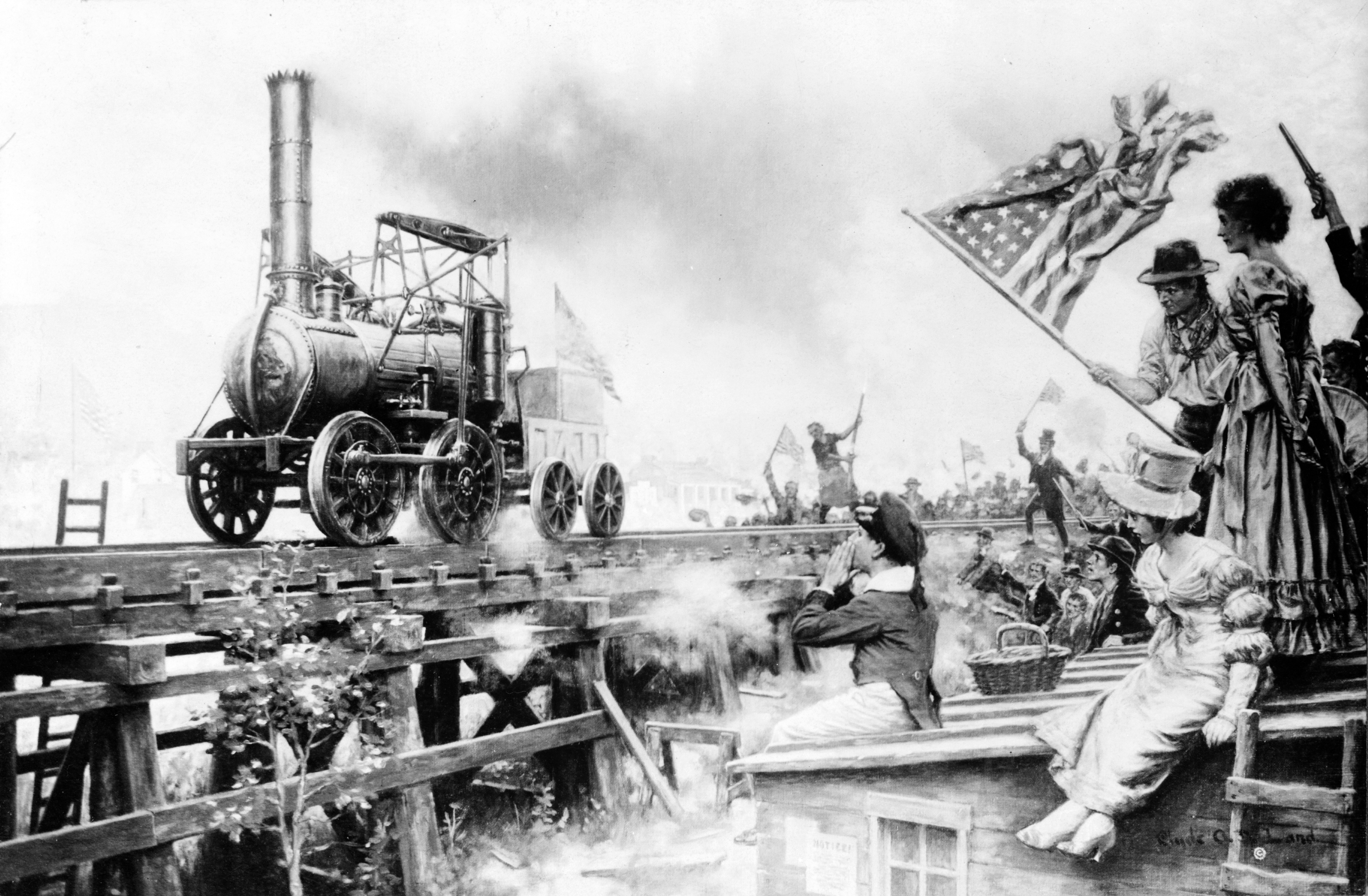
The first run of the Stourbridge Lion as depicted by the artist Clyde Osmer DeLand

The Delaware and Hudson Canal Company built a canal of total length 108 miles from Rondout on the Hudson River to Honesdale near a coal-bearing region named Carbondale. The canal was finished in 1828 but in order to connect the mines to the canal, the Chief Engineer of the project, John Jervis, planned to construct a railway of around 16 miles in length. Jervis entrusted an assistant, Horatio Allen, who was already planning to visit England, to purchase rail and a locomotive. In the end, Allen bought four locomotives, three from Foster, Rastrick and Company and one from Robert Stevenson & Co.

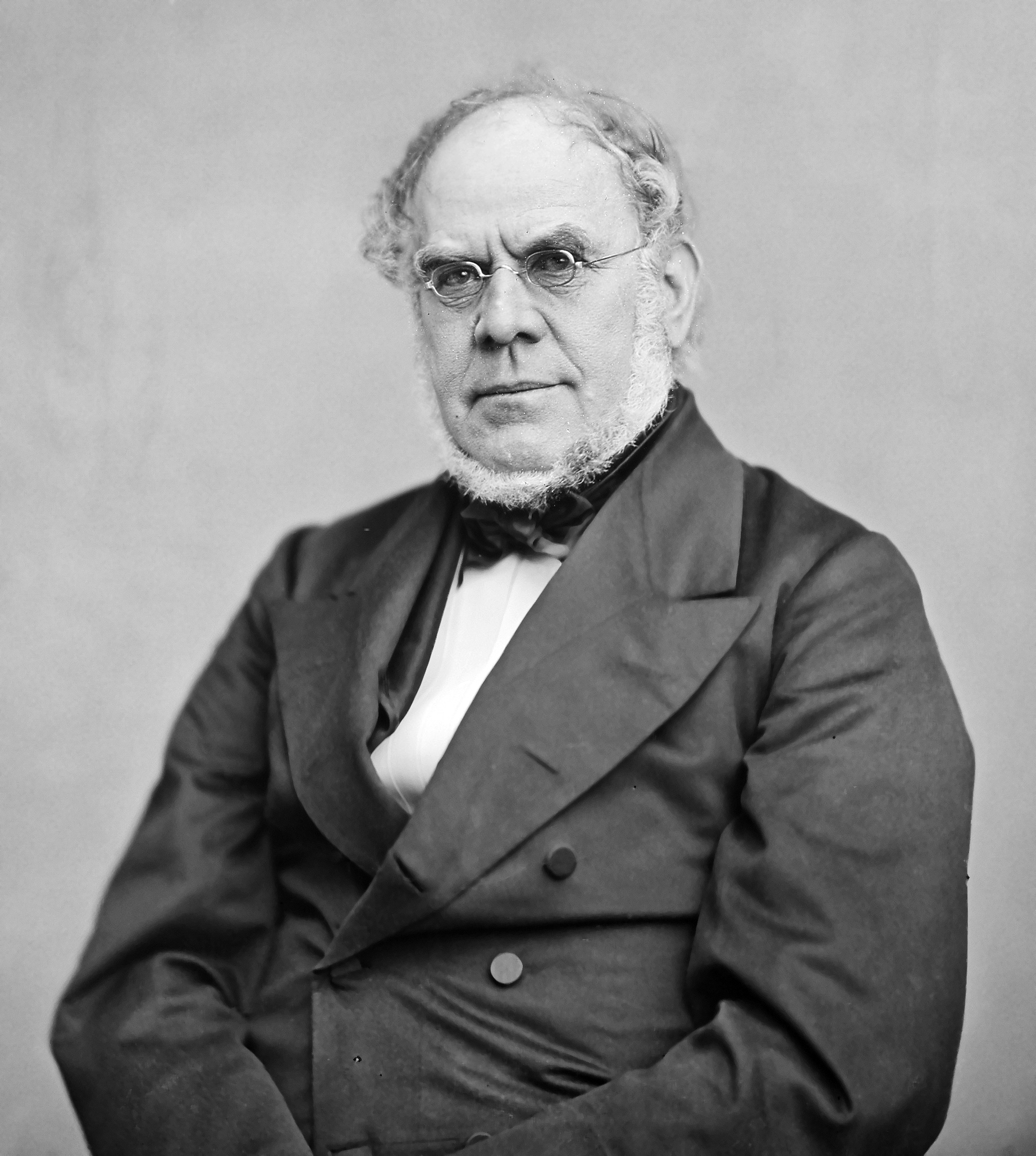
Horatio Allen arranged for the purchase of three locomotives from the company for the use of the Delaware and Hudson Canal Company

Of the Foster, Rastrick and Company engines, the Stourbridge Lion built in 1828, was the first locomotive to run on rails in America. It was shipped from Liverpool in April 1829. Two others, named Delaware and Hudson were supplied later that year. The Stourbridge Lion was tested on blocks on May 28, 1829. In July of that year it was sent to Honesdale by boat. Its first test on the railway took place on 8 August 1829 when it ran on 3 miles of track. It quickly became apparent that the track was not stable enough to bear the weight of the locomotive and after a second on September 8, 1829, it was decided not to use the locomotives. The railroad was subsequently operated using gravity, stationary engines and horse power.

=== For England ===
The fourth locomotive, Agenoria, was built for service on the Earl of Dudley's Shutt End Colliery Railway in Kingswinford, Staffordshire. It weighed 11 tons, had four coupled wheels of 4 ft ¾in diameter and two cylinders of 8.5 inches diameter by 36 inches stroke. Agenoria was probably the first locomotive to use mechanical lubrication for its axles. The boiler was 10 feet in length and four feet in diameter. The locomotive featured an extremely tall chimney of height 14 feet and 4 inches - this being the most immediately obvious difference between Agenoria and The Stourbridge Lion, which had a shorter chimney. The railway opened on 2 June 1829, the opening being described in Aris's Birmingham Gazette. The track, of standard gauge, was around three miles in length but featured two inclined planes that were too steep for the Agenoria to climb so the locomotive worked about two miles of near-level track. On the opening day, which according to Aris's Gazette, took place "amidst an immense concourse of spectators from the surrounding country", the locomotive first pulled eight carriages filled with 360 passengers along the level section at a rate of 7.5 miles an hour. For its next demonstration it was attached to twenty carriages, twelve of which carried coal whilst eight carried passengers. For this test it travelled at 3.5 miles an hour.

Unlike the company's first three steam locomotives it had a long life, being withdrawn from service in c. 1864. After a period of neglect, the locomotive was rediscovered disassembled and covered with rubbish. The person who rediscovered it, Mr. E.B. Marten, obtained the permission of the owner William Orme Foster to reassemble the engine and display it at an exhibition in Wolverhampton in 1884. After the exhibition, Foster presented the locomotive to the Science Museum (London) in December 1884 and it is now on permanent display at the National Railway Museum in York.

== Dissolution ==
Although pioneering, the company's locomotive designs were almost immediately outdated upon the arrival in 1829 of Robert Stephenson's Rocket, the locomotive which virtually set the pattern for the rest of the steam age. Ceasing locomotive work, the company was officially dissolved on 20 June 1831, its assets being absorbed into the Stourbridge Iron Works of John Bradley & Co. (iron manufacturer and owner of several coal mines), where James Foster was already the major partner and after 1832 the sole owner.

== The factory building today ==
The original factory building in Lowndes Road where Stourbridge Lion and Agenoria were built is still standing, although near to collapse from a fire in 2004. Its renovation began in 2012 to house (with a new adjoining building) a Stourbridge medical practice, named the Lion Medical Practice after the aforementioned Stourbridge Lion. Lion Medical Practice opened during April 2014.

== Sources ==
- Foster Rastrick & Co. Stourbridge – company overview
- Senate House Library, University of London, John Bradley & Co (Stourbridge) Ltd., Ironfounders . Retrieved 22 April 2005 – verifies Foster family connections and company dates.
- Lowe, J.W., (1989) British Steam Locomotive Builders, Guild Publishing
