= Agenoria (locomotive) =

Early steam locomotive built by the Foster, Rastrick and Co partnership of Stourbridge

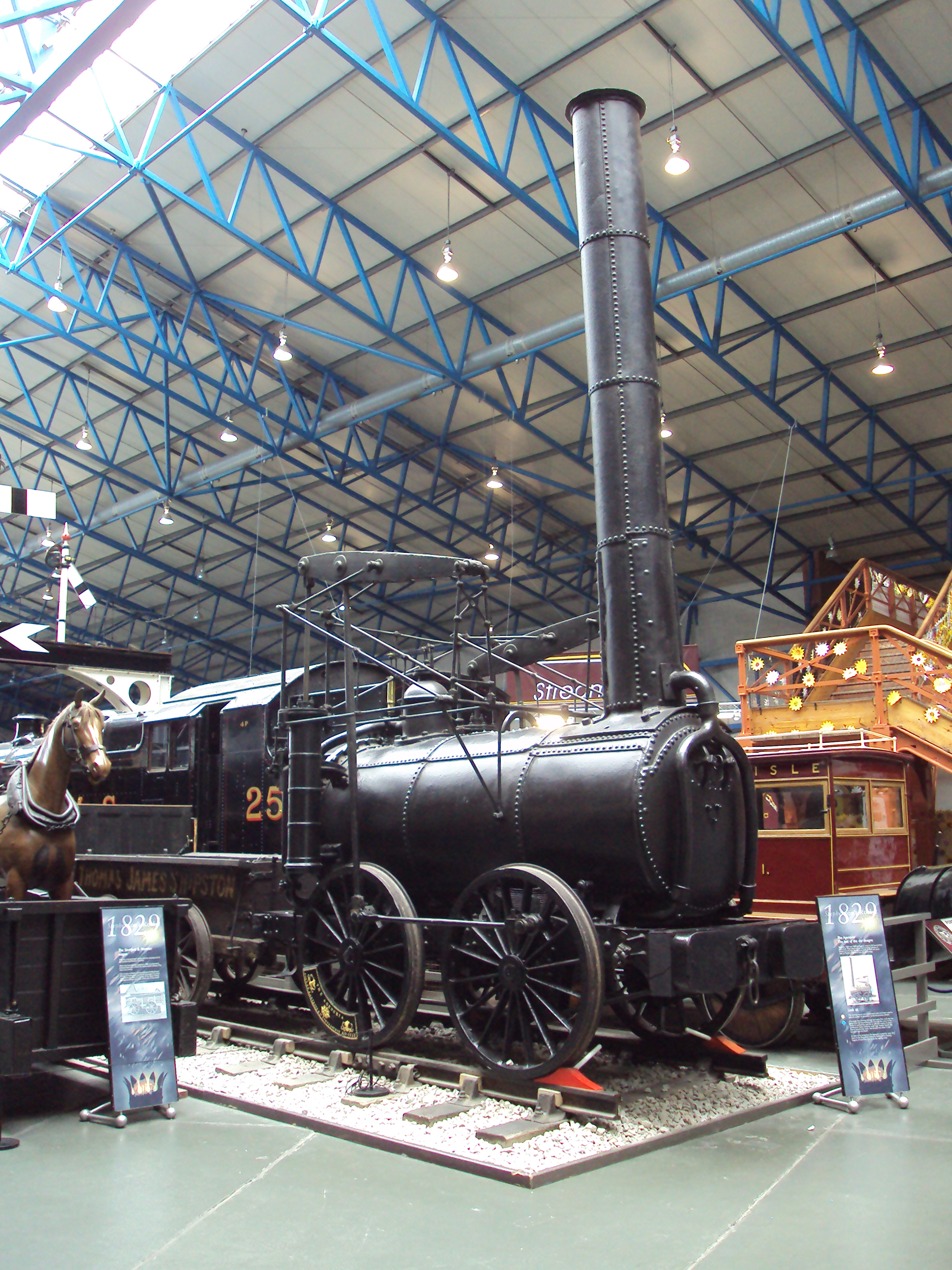
- Agenoria at the National Railway Museum, York
Type and origin
- Power type: Steam
- Builder: Foster, Rastrick and Company
- Build date: 1829
Specifications
- Configuration
  - Whyte: 0-4-0
- Gauge: 4 ft 8 1/2 in (1,435 mm) standard gauge
- Loco weight: 11 long tons (11.2 t; 12.3 short tons)
- Fuel type: Coal
- Boiler: 48 in (1,219 mm) × 10 ft (3,048 mm)
- Cylinders: 2, vertical
- Cylinder size: 8.5 in × 36 in (216 mm × 914 mm) bore × stroke
Career
- Operators: John Bradley & Co
- Retired: c. 1864
- Current owner: National Railway Museum, York
- Disposition: On static display

The Agenoria is an early steam locomotive built by the Foster, Rastrick and Co partnership of Stourbridge, England. It first ran on 2 June 1829 along the Kingswinsford Railway which was a 3-mile-long (4.8 km) line linking mines in the Shut End area of the Black Country with a canal basin at Ashwood on the Staffordshire and Worcestershire Canal. It was withdrawn from service around 1864 and was donated to the Science Museum (London) in December 1884. It is now on display at the National Railway Museum in York.

== Historical background ==
In 1823, James Foster, who controlled the firm John Bradley & Co., took a lease of land at Shut End, Kingswinford from J.H.H. Foley with the aim of exploiting the rich mineral deposits there and building an ironworks. In 1825, Foster wrote to local land owner John William Ward, the 4th Viscount Dudley and Ward proposing to build a railway to transport minerals from both Foster's and Lord Dudley's lands. In 1827 an agreement to construct a rail line to link the Shut End area to a purpose-built canal basin at Ashwood on the Staffordshire and Worcestershire Canal was signed by James Foster and Francis Downing, the mineral agent of Dudley Estate. The locomotive that ran on this line Agenoria was constructed by Foster, Rastrick and Company, which was a partnership between James Foster and the engineer John Urpeth Rastrick.

The name Agenoria was taken from a Roman goddess who was supposedly the "Goddess of Industry". (Note: 'Industry' in the sense of 'activity', rather than factories.)

== Design and construction ==
Side view, showing the grasshopper beam

The locomotive was constructed at the New Foundry, Stourbridge, which was situated on the other side of the river Stour from John Bradley & Co's Stourbridge Ironworks. The works, which were designed and constructed by John Urpeth Rastrick, were connected to the Stourbridge canal by a tramway. Although the designer Rastrick had many years of steam engine construction and railway engineering experience, the only locomotive he had built before was the Catch Me Who Can, designed by Richard Trevithick. An article in The Engineer from 1890 points out the similarities between the design adopted for Agenoria and that of the celebrated Puffing Billy of 1813–14.

The locomotive, tender and water weighed around 11 long tons (11.2 t; 12.3 short tons) according to an exhibition catalogue of 1884. It had four 4 ft (1.2 m) diameter driving wheels and two 8.5 in × 36 in (220 mm × 910 mm) cylinders. The cylinders acted through grasshopper beams, generally unconventional but used on all of Foster, Rastrick's locomotives. Agenoria was probably the first locomotive to use mechanical lubrication for its axles. The flued boiler was 10 ft (3.0 m) feet long and 4 feet diameter. The grate was contained in a 29 in-diameter (0.74 m) furnace tube, which branched into two 18 in-diameter (0.46 m) flues. The locomotive featured an extremely tall (14 ft 4 in (4,370 mm)) chimney to aid draughting.

The boiler had two safety valves, one of which was inaccessible to the enginemen. An unusual feature of the locomotive is the balance weights in the driving wheels, which also act as decorative nameplates.

According to The Engineer of 1890:

The Agenoria has upright cylinders working half-beams, thus reducing the stroke of the pistons to the cranks. The cylinders are 8 1/2 in diameter, with a stroke of 3 ft. There is a parallel motion to the piston-rod, and the feed pump is worked from one of the half-beams. The fire is within a large tubular boiler, branching into two tubes, with the chimney at the end of the boiler, the barrel of which is 10 ft long and 4 ft diameter. The excentrics for driving the slides are loose on the axle, with a clutch to drive either way, and there is hand gear to the valves to cause the axle to turn half round to bring the right clutch into action. The exhaust steam is discharged into the chimney, but it does not necessarily follow that it acted as a steam blast. Indeed, the great height given to the chimney can have no other object than to create the required draught. The driving wheels are 4 ft 3/4 in diameter, and there are coupling rods to the front wheels, which are provided with springs.

Foster, Rastrick and Company only produced four locomotives, three of which were exported to the United States. These included their best known locomotive, and the first in the US, the Stourbridge Lion.

== Operation ==
The railway opened on 2 June 1829, the opening being described in Aris's Birmingham Gazette. The track, of standard gauge, was around three miles (4.8 km) in length but featured two inclined planes that were too steep for the Agenoria to climb so the locomotive worked about two miles of near-level track. On the opening day, which according to Aris's Gazette, took place "amidst an immense concourse of spectators from the surrounding country", the locomotive first pulled eight carriages filled with 360 passengers along the level section at a rate of 7.5 miles per hour (12.1 km/h). For its next demonstration it was attached to twenty carriages, twelve of which carried coal whilst eight carried passengers. For this test it travelled at 3.5 miles per hour (5.6 km/h). For its final test of the day it ran for a mile with just the tender attached carrying 20 passengers when it achieved a speed of eleven miles per hour (18 km/h) at half power.

Agenoria had a long working life, being withdrawn from service in c. 1864. It was housed at an engine shed near an incline that lead to Foster's Shut End industries. At a Parliamentary enquiry Rastrick described the working of the railway and stated that, after loaded wagons had descended an inclined plane, "a Locomotive then takes them 2 miles (3.2 km), when another plane takes them to the bottom: the engine runs at a rate of 7 or 8 miles per hour (11 or 13 km/h), which is above its power, but is seldom out of order".

Although it is not known when Agenoria finished its working life, a letter from the mineral agent of the Dudley Estate to James Foster's successor at John Bradley & Co, William Orme Foster, implied that the locomotive was not running on the line in April 1864 although it is not clear whether it was a temporary or permanent stoppage. Shortly afterwards, W.O. Foster's agent wrote back agreeing to provide a new engine as part of an agreement to improve the railway. A new locomotive was delivered to Foster's company John Bradley & Co. in 1865. It is generally assumed that Agenoria had been abandoned by this time.

== Preservation ==
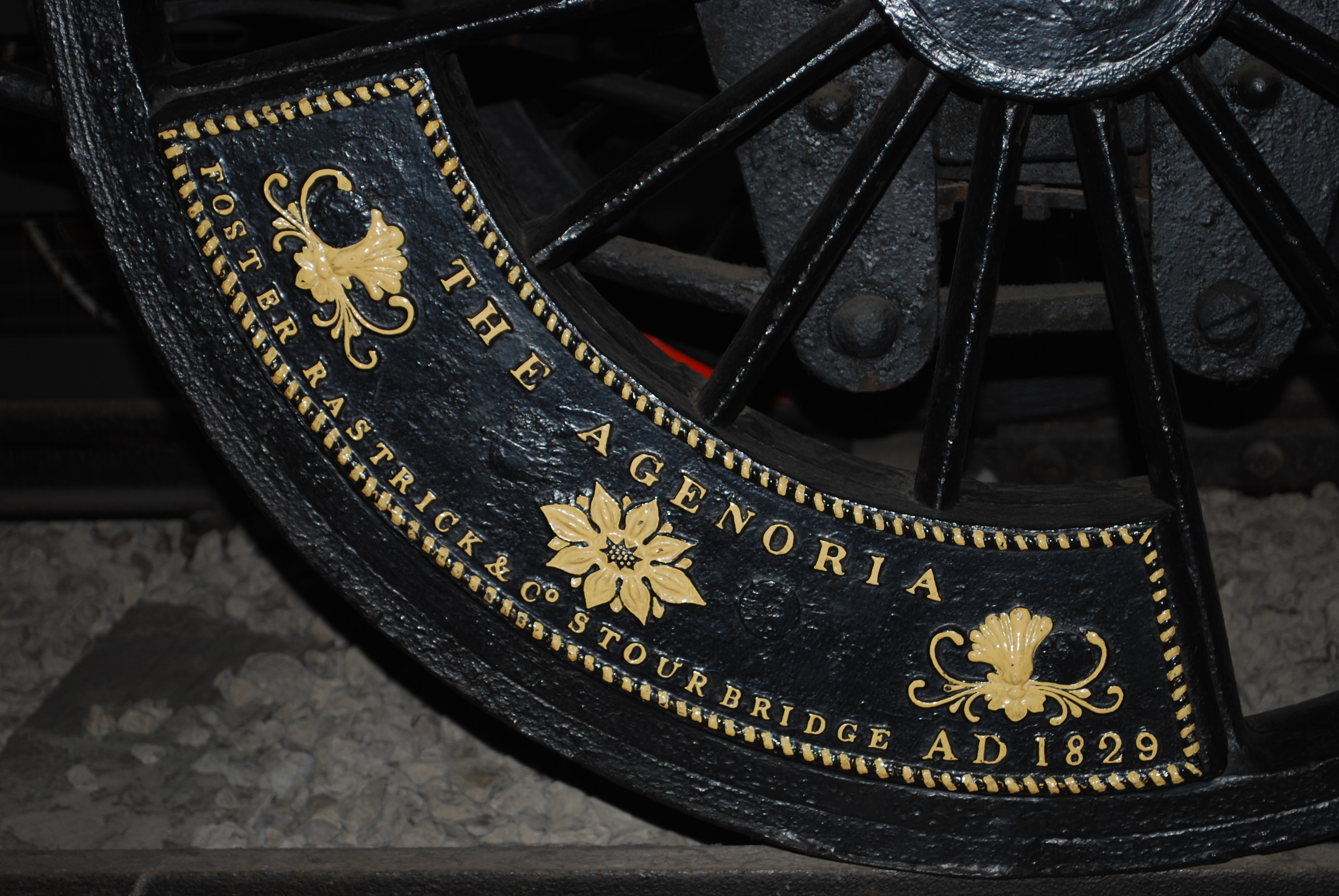
The unusual maker's plate, forming a balance weight on the driving wheel

After a period of neglect, the locomotive was rediscovered disassembled and covered with rubbish. One of its cylinders had been removed and used as a pumping engine. The person who rediscovered it, Mr. E.B. Marten, obtained the permission of the owner William Orme Foster to reassemble the engine (including the missing cylinder) and display it at an exhibition in Wolverhampton in 1884. After the exhibition, Foster presented the locomotive and its tender to the Science Museum, London in December 1884. The museum disposed of the tender in 1897.

The locomotive was loaned to the London and North Eastern Railway's Museum at York in 1937 but was sent to Reedsmouth in 1941 for protection during the war. In 1951, Agenoria featured as an exhibit at the Festival of Britain. The locomotive was sent back to York in 1974 and is now on permanent display (with a replica tender) at the National Railway Museum in York.
