= Stourbridge Lion =

Railroad steam locomotive built in 1829

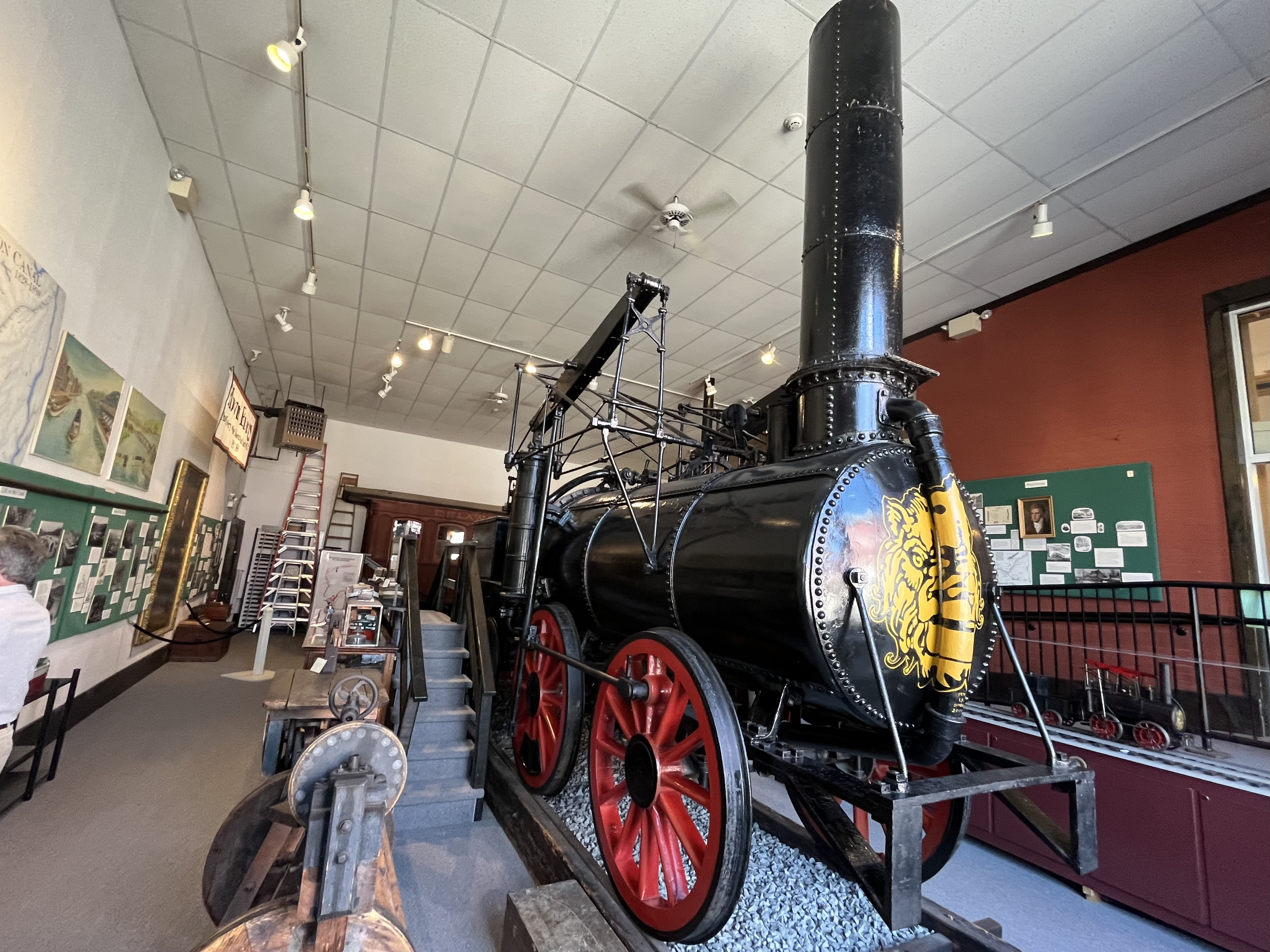
- A replica of the Stourbridge Lion steam locomotive in the Wayne County Historical Society museum in Honesdale, Pennsylvania
Type and origin
- Power type: Steam
- Builder: Foster, Rastrick and Company
- Build date: 1829
Specifications
- Configuration
  - Whyte: 0-4-0
- Gauge: 4 ft 3 in (1,295 mm)
- Driver dia.: 48 in (1.219 m)
- Loco weight: 14,000 lb (6,400 kg; 6.4 t)
- Tender weight: 5,800 lb (2,600 kg; 2.6 t)
- Total weight: 19,800 lb (9,000 kg; 9.0 t)
- Firebox
  - Grate area: 8 ft^{2} (0.74 m^{2})
- Boiler: 48 in (1.219 m) dia. 10.5 ft (3.20 m) long
- Cylinder size: 8.5 in × 36 in (216 mm × 914 mm) bore × stroke
Career
- Operators: Delaware & Hudson Canal Company (D&H)
- First run: August 8, 1829
- Retired: 1834
- Current owner: Smithsonian Institution
- Disposition: Only the boiler remains; other parts were scrapped or stolen in the 1800s

The Stourbridge Lion (/ˈstɜːr.brɪdʒ/) was an early railroad steam locomotive. In 1829 it was the first locomotive to be operated in the United States, although foreign-built, and one of the first locomotives to operate outside Britain. It takes its name from the lion's face painted on the front, and Stourbridge (/ˈstaʊərbrɪdʒ/) in England, where it was manufactured by the firm Foster, Rastrick and Company in 1829.

The locomotive, obtained by the Delaware & Hudson Canal Company (D&H), was shipped to New York in May 1829, where it was tested raised on blocks. It was then taken to Honesdale, Pennsylvania for testing on the company's newly built track. The locomotive performed well in its first test in August 1829, but was found to be too heavy for the track and was never used for its intended purpose of hauling coal wagons. During the next few decades, a number of parts were removed from the abandoned locomotive until only the boiler and a few other components remained. These were acquired by the Smithsonian Institution in 1890 and have been on display at the National Museum of Railroad History & Innovation in Baltimore since 1999.

== History ==
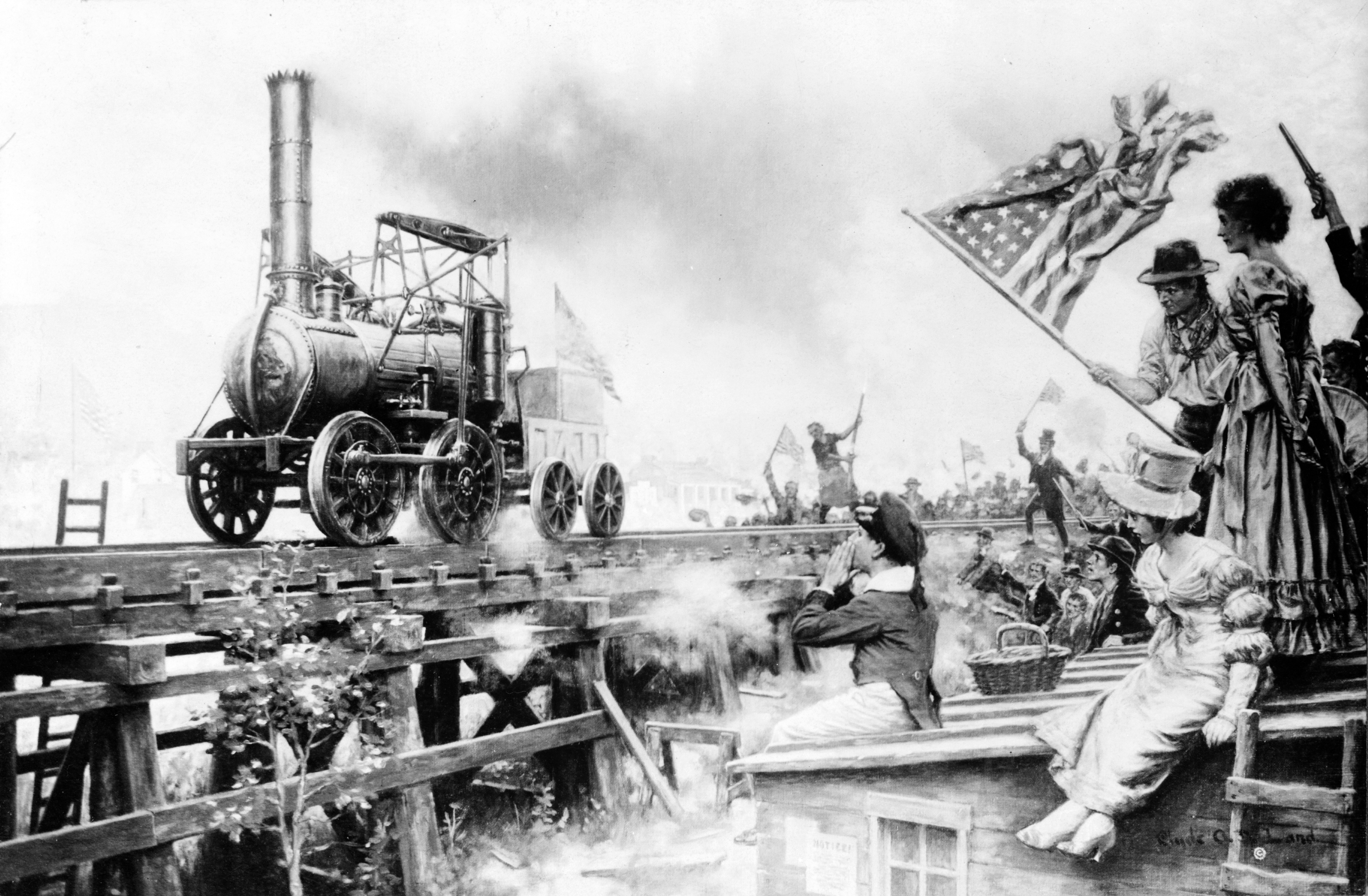
The Stourbridge Lion's first run, as depicted by Clyde Osmer DeLand c. 1916

One of the first railroads in the United States, the D&H was originally chartered in 1823 to build and operate canals between New York City and the coal fields around Carbondale, Pennsylvania. While the line was originally planned as a canal for the entire route, company engineers began thinking about rail transportation as early as 1825; the initial plan was to build a railroad between the mines and the western end of the canal as a way to get the coal to the canal boats.

John B. Jervis, who later became the designer of the 4-2-0 (the Jervis type) locomotive, was named the D&H's chief engineer in 1827. Jervis planned out a series of inclines connected by level, but themselves disconnected, railroads. The company directors liked Jervis's plan and authorized its construction with some hesitation for the as-yet unproven railroad technology.

In 1828, a former coworker of Jervis, Horatio Allen, went on a railroad research tour of England. Through Allen, Jervis sent specifications for locomotives that could be used on the D&H. Allen wrote back in July that four locomotives had been ordered, three from Foster, Rastrick and Company and one from Robert Stephenson and Company, for the D&H.

Stourbridge Lion was one of these three locomotives built by Rastrick, but Stephenson's shop had completed their locomotive, the Pride of Newcastle, before any of Rastrick's locomotives. The Pride of Newcastle even arrived in America nearly two months before the Stourbridge Lion, but it was the latter that was used for the first railroad trials. The price on delivery of the Stourbridge Lion was $2,914.90, equivalent to $88,130 in 2025.

The locomotive was transported from Liverpool aboard the ship John Jay, arriving at New York in mid-May 1829. It was assembled at the West Point Foundry in New York where it was first tested under steam. Here, it was reported that it "became the object of curiosity to thousands who visited the works from day to day to see the 'critter' go through the motions only". Its first official run took place on August 8, 1829 in Honesdale, Pennsylvania. According to an eye-witness, "the fire was kindled and steam raised, and, under the management of Horatio Allen, the 'wonderful machine' was found capable of moving, to the great joy of the crowd of excited spectators". Despite having no experience of driving a locomotive, Allen took the Stourbridge Lion out for its first test on his own, driving it about three miles along the track including a raised section over the Lackawaxen Creek. He then reversed the locomotive back to its starting point. The locomotive performed admirably, but the track that was built on which to run it was insufficient for the task (the company had not used all-iron rails but instead iron strips applied to a wooden rail). Jervis had specified that the locomotives should weigh no more than 4 tons; the Stourbridge Lion weighed nearly double that, 7.5 tons.

The two other Foster, Rastrick & Co locomotives that had been ordered by Allen, Delaware and Hudson, arrived separately at New York in August and September 1829 before being shipped on to Rondout.

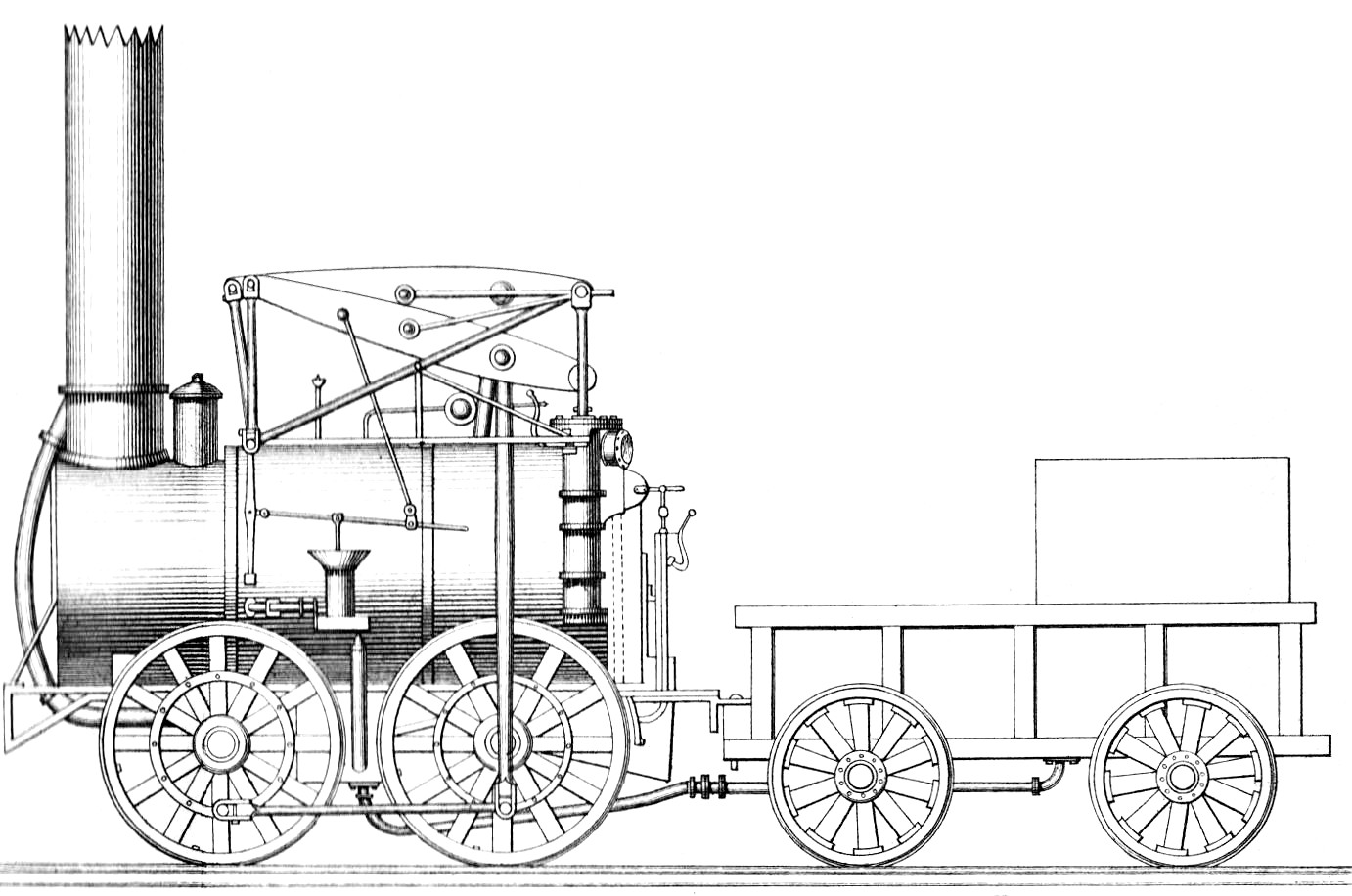
The Stourbridge Lion (Lithograph)

Rastrick built another engine at about the same time as the Stourbridge Lion intended for use in England. This engine, the Agenoria, was of very similar design to the Stourbridge Lion although of a different gauge and with a markedly longer chimney. The Agenoria first ran in June 1829, was operated for more than 30 years and is currently preserved at the National Railway Museum in York, England.

By 1834, documents show that the railroad attempted to sell the Stourbridge Lion and its early sisters to the Pennsylvania Canal Commission, but the deal was not finalized. The locomotives were deemed too unsuitable for the now expanding railroads; American locomotive manufacturers had begun producing their own locomotives of improved designs as early as 1830. The four locomotives were used as sources of English wrought-iron bar stock until the middle of the 1840s.

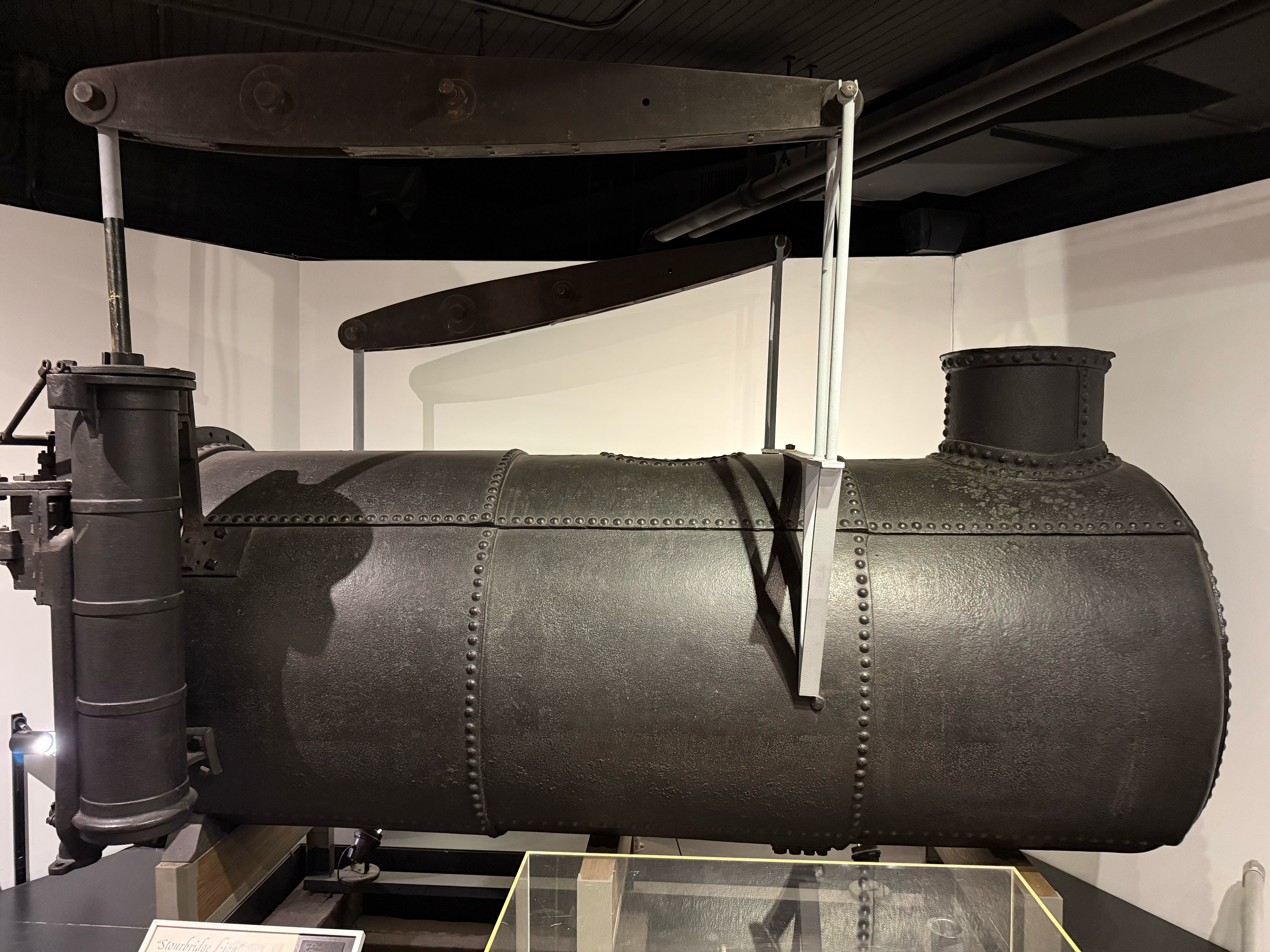
Stourbridge Lion boiler on display at the National Museum of Railroad History & Innovation

By 1845, all that was left of the Stourbridge Lion was its boiler. The boiler was still functional, however, and it was used in a foundry in Carbondale for about another five years until the foundry's owner headed west to try his luck as a Forty-niner. The foundry was sold a few years later to new owners who recognized the boiler's value as a piece of history, and in 1874 reportedly tried to sell it for $1,000 (equivalent to $28,456 in 2025). The owners were unable to find a buyer.

In 1883, the D&H borrowed the boiler to display at the Exposition of Railway Appliances in Chicago. Unfortunately, security around the boiler's transportation was lax; souvenir hunters pulled every loose item that they could off the now historic boiler, even resorting to hammers and chisels to remove portions of it.

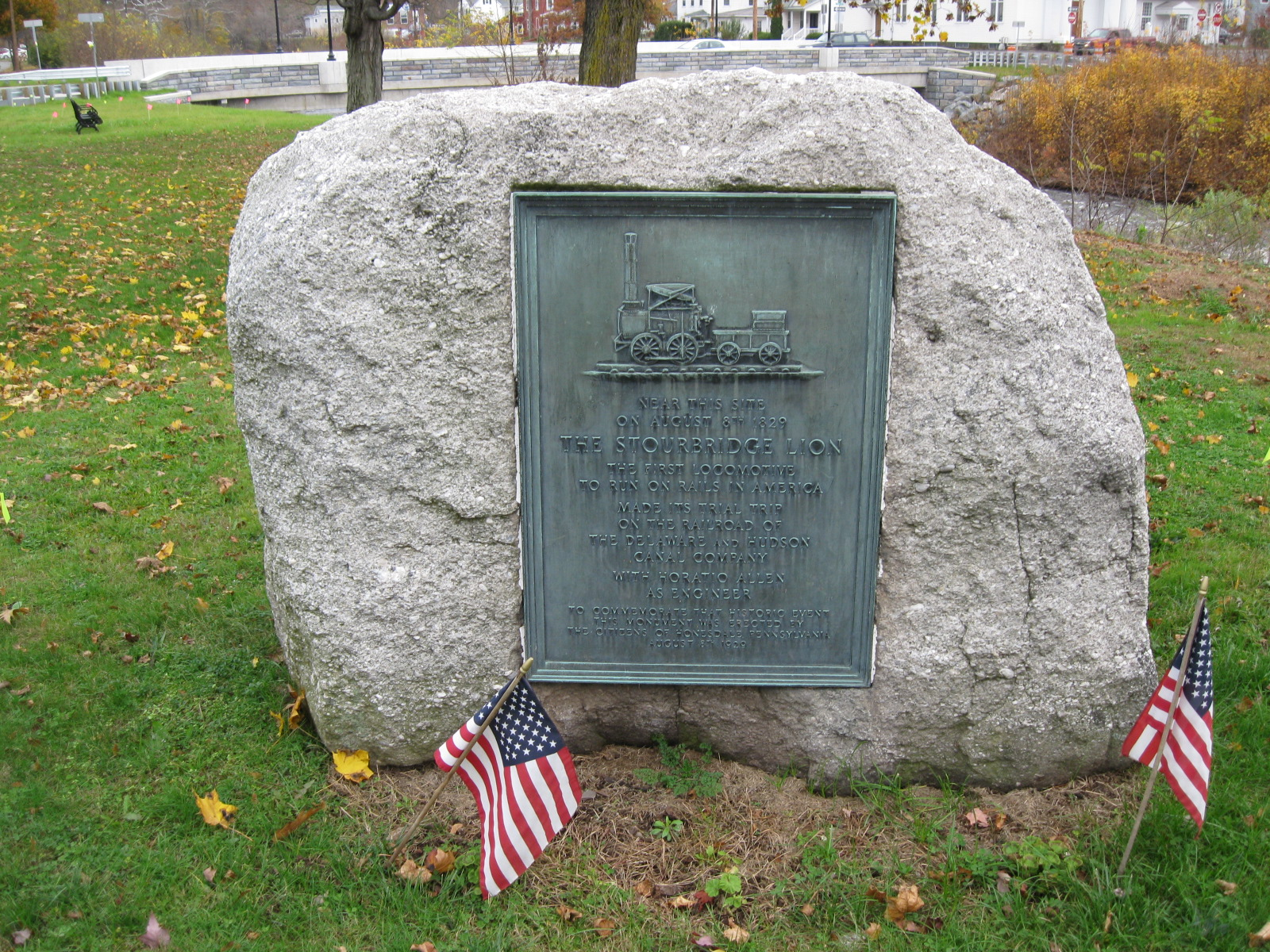
A plaque commemorating the Stourbridge Lion at Honesdale, Pennsylvania

The boiler was stored again and eventually acquired by the Smithsonian Institution in 1890. A few other parts that are believed to have been from the Stourbridge Lion are also preserved, but their authenticity is questioned. These other parts may have come from one or more of the locomotive's sister engines. The museum has made a few attempts to rebuild the locomotive with the parts that remain. However, with the parts' origins still in question, and the lack of a few other key parts, the locomotive's reconstruction has never been completed. The boiler and assembled parts are currently on display at the National Museum of Railroad History & Innovation in Baltimore.

The D&H built their own replica of the Stourbridge Lion in 1932 from plans that were made based on the parts remaining in existence. The Wayne County Historical Society Museum contains a full-scale replica of the Stourbridge Lion, and is home to many related photographs and artifacts. This museum is in a small brick building on Main Street, Honesdale, Pennsylvania, which was once the D&H Canal's company office, and is where the Stourbridge Lion began its inaugural run.

== Mechanical description ==
The boiler had a simple single flue, with the chimney exiting through the upper part of the boiler drum. This was not a smokebox as such, as there was no smokebox door for access and cleaning. A prominent external exhaust pipe ahead of the boiler led to a blastpipe within the chimney. The exhaust pipe is visible in many pictures of the locomotive.

The piston rods connected to a pair of grasshopper beams (one for each cylinder) mounted above the boiler. A connecting rod near the piston end of the walking beams drove the rear axle's wheels, where it also connected to a coupling rod to drive the front wheels.

== See also ==
- The Stourbridge Line (the current line on the track used by the Stourbridge Lion)

== Sources ==
- Wolmar, Christian (2012). The Great Railroad Revolution. PublicAffairs. ISBN 978-1-61039-179-5.
- Yenne, Bill (2005). Atlas of North American Railroads. Voyageur Press. ISBN 978-0-7603-2299-4.
- EuDaly, Kevin; Schafer, Mike (2009). The Complete Book of North American Railroading. Voyageur Press. ISBN 978-0-7603-2848-4.
