= John Bradley & Co =

John Bradley & Co was a company established in 1800 by John Bradley at Stourbridge in the West Midlands area of England. The company developed into a large industrial concern with furnaces, ironworks and mines. Under James Foster, John Bradley's half brother, it was instrumental in bringing the first commercial steam locomotive into the Midlands area in 1829. The firm stayed under family control until the early years of the 20th century when first the mining (1913) and then the ironworks (1919) were sold off. Part of the business continued to trade under the name John Bradley & Co. (Stourbridge) Ltd until after the Second World War.

== History ==
=== Founding and early years ===
John Bradley (1769-1816) was the son of Gabriel and Mary Bradley (née Haden) of the town of Stourbridge, where they ran an iron business including Stourbridge Forge on the River Stour. After Gabriel's death in 1771, Mary married Henry Foster and had seven further children, six of whom survived infancy. The youngest of their sons was James Foster. Henry Foster died in 1793.

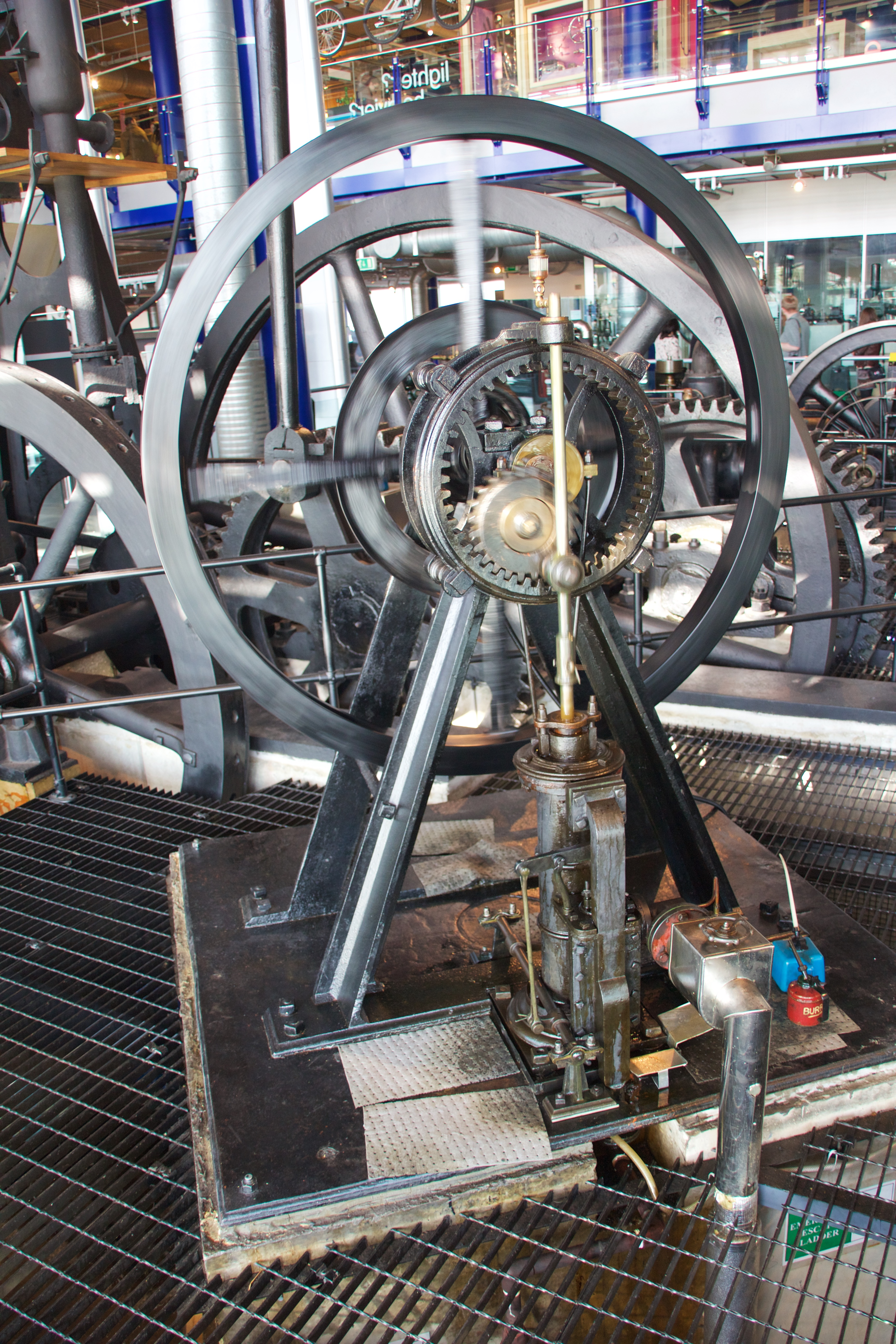
Murray's Hypocycloidal Engine, a steam engine, was installed at John Bradley's in 1805

John Bradley founded his firm in 1800 in Stourbridge with the financial assistance of Thomas Jukes Collier, a wine merchant from Wellington. Bradley leased land by the Stourbridge Canal. where he set up a forge, a furnace and a rolling and slitting mill. The company produced wrought iron using the puddling process. In 1802 the company was set up as a partnership divided into three: one third held by John Bradley, one third by Thomas Jukes Collier and a third held in trust for the children of the late Henry Foster (John Bradley's six half-brothers and sisters). A steam engine owned by the company, Murray's Hypocycloidal Engine, built in 1805, has been preserved and is now in Thinktank, Birmingham Science Museum. It is the world's third-oldest working steam engine. At this stage the company didn't make iron from ore but bought in pig iron to be turned into wrought iron at the Stourbridge Ironworks.

By 1807 the Foster family share of the company was concentrated in the hands of the brothers James and William Foster.

In 1809 the company acquired Eardinton Forge near the River Severn to the south of Bridgnorth.

William Foster left the partnership in 1813, subsequently running the Stourbridge Forge as an independent business, and, as Thomas Jukes Collier had already sold his share of the company to the other partners, this meant that the company was co-owned by John Bradley and James Foster after this date. John Bradley died 1816.

=== The company under James Foster ===
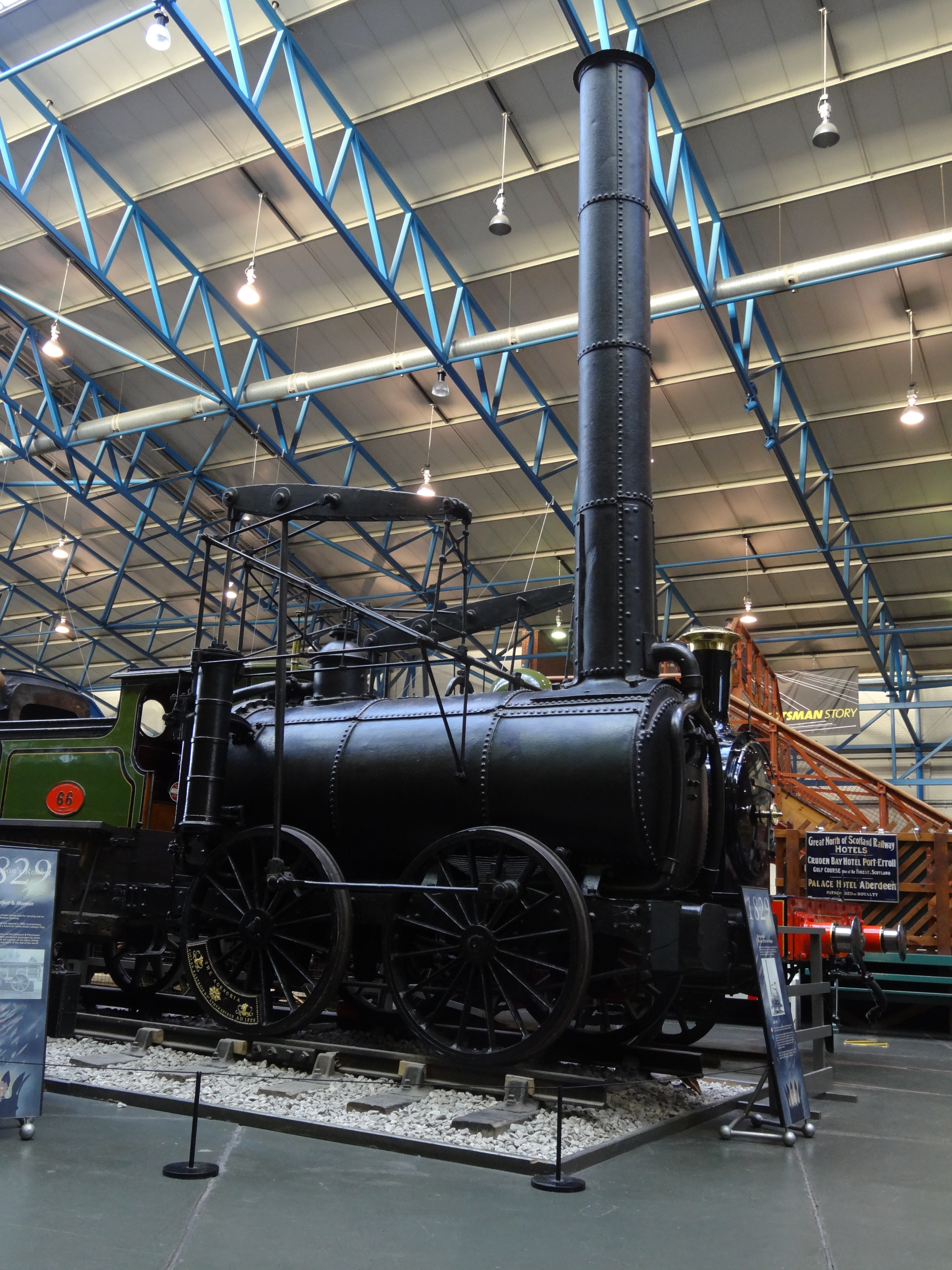
Agenoria, an early steam locomotive owned and operated by John Bradley & Co, now at the National Railway Museum, York

After his half-brother's death, James Foster took control of the enterprise, which included the Stourbridge Iron Works. He was not the sole owner at this stage, however, since a proportion of the company was held in trust for the Bradley children.

In 1823 John Bradley & Co., took a lease of land at Shut End, Kingswinford from J.H.H. Foley with the aim of exploiting the coal and other minerals found there as well as building furnaces. An agreement to construct a rail line to link the Shut End area to a purpose-built canal basin at Ashwood on the Staffordshire and Worcestershire Canal was signed in 1827 by James Foster and Francis Downing, the mineral agent of John William Ward, the 4th Viscount Dudley and Ward. The locomotive that ran on this line Agenoria was constructed by Foster, Rastrick and Company which was a partnership between James Foster and the engineer John Urpeth Rastrick. Agenoria was housed on a siding at Shut End and remained the property of John Bradley & Co.

The Foster, Rastrick & Co business was wound up by mutual consent on 20 June 1831, its assets being absorbed into John Bradley & Co.

A guide to Stourbridge and its vicinity published in 1832 gave the following description of the company: "on the left bank of the canal, occupying a space intervening between its channel and that of the Stour, being the south side of the wharf; stands the vast range of buildings denominated Stourbridge Iron Works, conducted under the firm of John Bradley and Co. This extensive concern, generally considered as belonging to James Foster, Esq. comprehends all the various parts of the iron processes with the exception of the incipient one of smelting the ore, the pigs being obtained from distant localities." The same source reported: "every species of requisite machinery, from the potent Leviathan of the mechanic arts, to the minutest instrument, is here in full operation, and the multiform articles demanded by the artisan, are completely prepared and supplied. Under the same firm, large works in the county of Salop and elsewhere are carried on; as also extensive collieries at Shutt-end, Kingswinford, and in the vicinity of Dudley."

By 1835 Foster had constructed furnaces and developed a colliery at Shut End. John Bradley & Co. had also an ironworks at Brockmoor by this date.

On 27 February 1836, Henry Bradley, John's only surviving son decided to leave the business (he had been involved in the company since 1827) and sold his share to Foster. The four daughters of John Bradley had already sold their own shares in the company and so James Foster became sole owner of John Bradley & Co. At this time the company was described as having premises at: Stourbridge, Eardington, Hampton's Load, Shutt End, Brettell Lane, Baptist End, Scott's Green, and Brockmoor in the counties of Worcestershire, Shropshire, and Staffordshire.

In 1840, the 2-mile long Stourbridge Extension Canal opened, linking Bradley's Shut End works with the canal network.

In a Parliamentary report from 1843, Foster was described as a 'large proprietor of iron-works and collieries, employing about 5000 hands'.

On James Foster's death in 1853, John Bradley & Co. passed to James's nephew William Orme Foster. He was the son of William Foster, who had left the Bradley partnership in 1813, and Charlotte Foster (née Orme).

=== William Orme Foster as owner ===
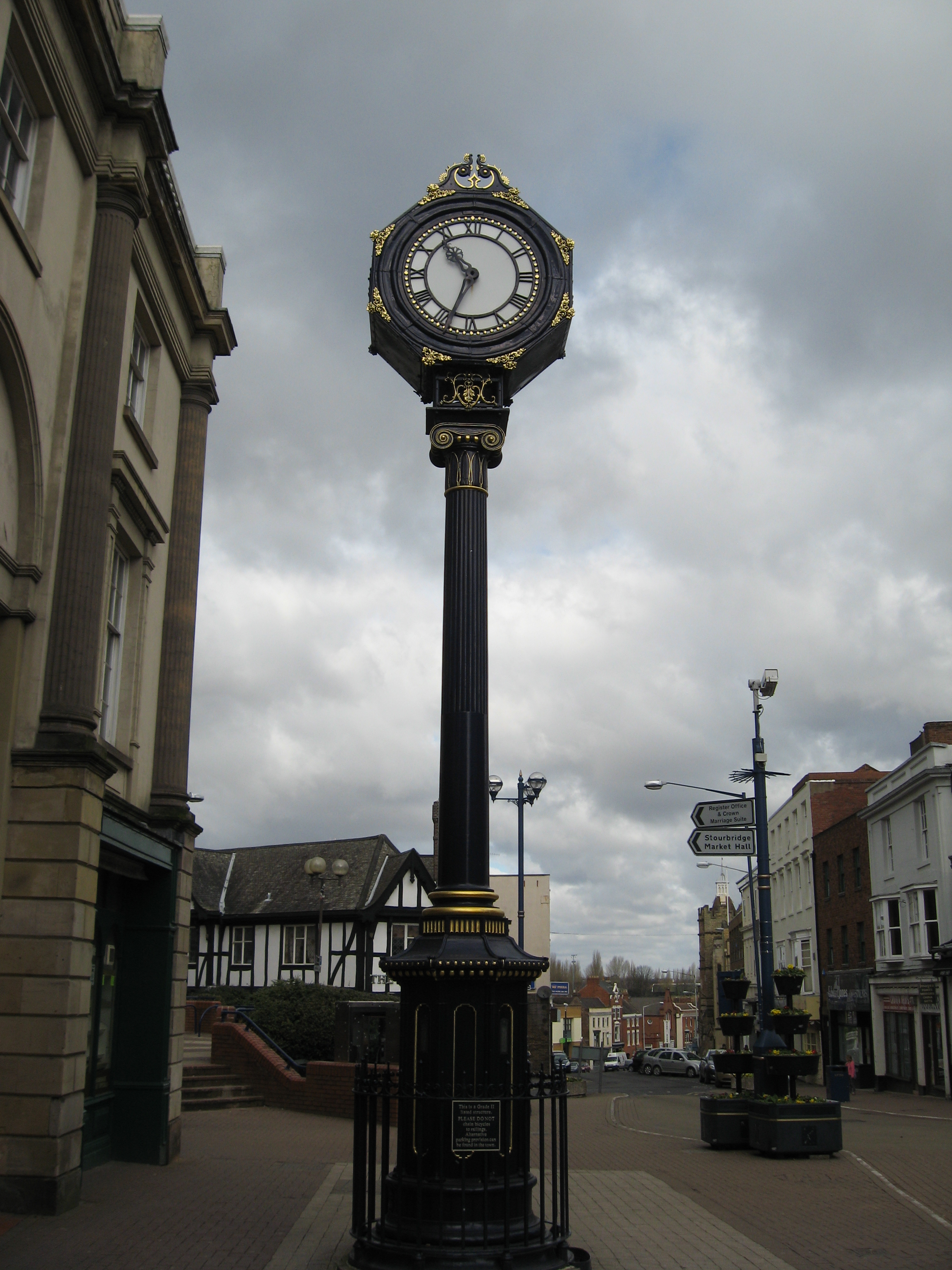
Stourbridge Town Clock, donated to the town by William Orme Foster in 1857, was designed and constructed at John Bradley & Co.'s Stourbridge Iron Works

The company continued to be a very large industrial concern under William, although its profits came under pressure as steel manufacturers competed with the traditional iron products of John Bradley & Co.

In the mid-1860s an agreement was reached between the company and the Earl of Dudley's estate to upgrade the railway track between Shut End and the Ashwood Basin and to re-align the steep incline at the canal end of the line such that it could be worked by a locomotive instead of a stationary engine. As part of the agreement, John Bradley & Co. undertook to purchase a new locomotive to replace the outdated Agenoria. In 1865 the company bought the locomotive Prince of Wales from the Leeds firm Manning Wardle followed by Queen (1867) and Princess of Wales (1879) from the same manufacturer.

The 1860s were good years for the company. In 1869 the company was valued at around £250,000 (an increase from around £150,000 on James Foster's death). It was operating 95 wrought iron-producing puddling furnaces at this time.

However, the subsequent fortunes of the company were less bright as the iron trade declined generally in the 1870s. By 1882 the number of wrought iron-producing furnaces had reduced to 29. In 1884, William Orme Foster attempted but failed to sell the company. In 1885 some of the original land leases obtained by James Foster in order to build the Kingswinford Railway were set to expire. It was decided that the link to the Ashwood Basin was no longer necessary for Bradley's Shut End works, which were by then connected to the canal and mainline rail network. It was then arranged for the Dudley Estate to take over the leases, which included the Ashwood Basin itself.

During the final years of the nineteenth century, William Orme Foster contracted the company. At the end of the century just the Shut End and Stourbridge industries remained active, although the furnaces at Shut End had closed in the 1890s.

On William Orme's death on 29 September 1899, his son, William Henry Foster, inherited John Bradley & Co.

=== Final years ===
The Shut End collieries were sold to H.S. Pitt & Company in 1913. The collieries were worked using the railway network built by John Bradley & Co until around 1937. The land now forms part of the Pensnett Trading Estate.

In 1919 the Stourbridge Iron Works were sold to a company owned by Edward J. Taylor, which ran the business under the name John Bradley & Co. (Stourbridge) Ltd. In the interwar period, N. Hingley & Sons Ltd acquired John Bradley & Co. (Stourbridge) Ltd but it still continued to trade under that name until 1963. The company was finally wound up in 1966 although the Stourbridge Ironworks continued as a rolling mill within the F.H. Lloyd Group until 1982. One of the last firms to operate on the site was Sidney Smith & Sons (Stourbridge) Ltd. The works became derelict by 2005. The main surviving building on the site is the New Foundry of 1821, originally built for the Foster, Rastrick and Company partnership but part of John Bradley & Co. after 1831. This building has been converted into a medical centre known as Lion Health.
