= John Bradley (ironmaster) =

English industrialist (1769–1816)

- Born: 1769; Stourbridge, England
- Died: 1816 (aged 46–47)
- Occupation: industrialist

John Bradley (1769–1816) was an English industrialist from the town of Stourbridge who founded the family firm John Bradley & Co in the year 1800. The company was originally based on the side of the canal at Stourbridge and included the Stourbridge Ironworks. John Bradley died in 1816 but the firm that he founded expanded greatly under the control of James Foster, who was Bradley's half brother.

== Early years ==
John Bradley was born in 1769 in the town of Stourbridge, the son of Gabriel and Mary Bradley (née Haden). John's Bradley ancestors were Quakers who had settled in Stourbridge in the 17th century. John was still an infant when his father died and his mother remarried Henry Foster. Mary and Henry had several children including James Foster. Henry Foster died in 1793. The family home from the time of Gabriel Bradley was situated on the High Street in Stourbridge. Gabriel had also owned Stourbridge Forge as well as an anvil shop, warehouses and various other buildings.

== Career ==
John Bradley founded the firm of John Bradley & Co in 1800, taking a lease on land next to the canal at Stourbridge with the aim of constructing an ironworks. In 1802 a deed of co-partnership was drawn up between John Bradley, the businessman Thomas Jukes Collier, and the trustees of the estate of the late Henry Foster. By this time the company had constructed a slitting and rolling mill and a forge at the site.

In 1807, John's half-brothers James and William Foster became equal partners in the company.

In 1809, the company took a lease on a forge at Eardington.

In 1813, William Foster left the partnership so that John Bradley and James Foster became equal partners.

== Family life ==
John Bradley was married in 1799 to Priscilla, the eldest daughter of Bate Richards of Stourbidge, and together they had six children.

== Death ==
John Bradley's death on 13 January 1816, left James Foster in control of the company, which subsequently expanded, acquiring new sites in the Black Country and in Shropshire. John's sole surviving son, Henry Bradley, joined John Bradley & Co as a partner in 1827 but left the company some ten years later.
