= Horatio Allen =

American civil engineer and inventor

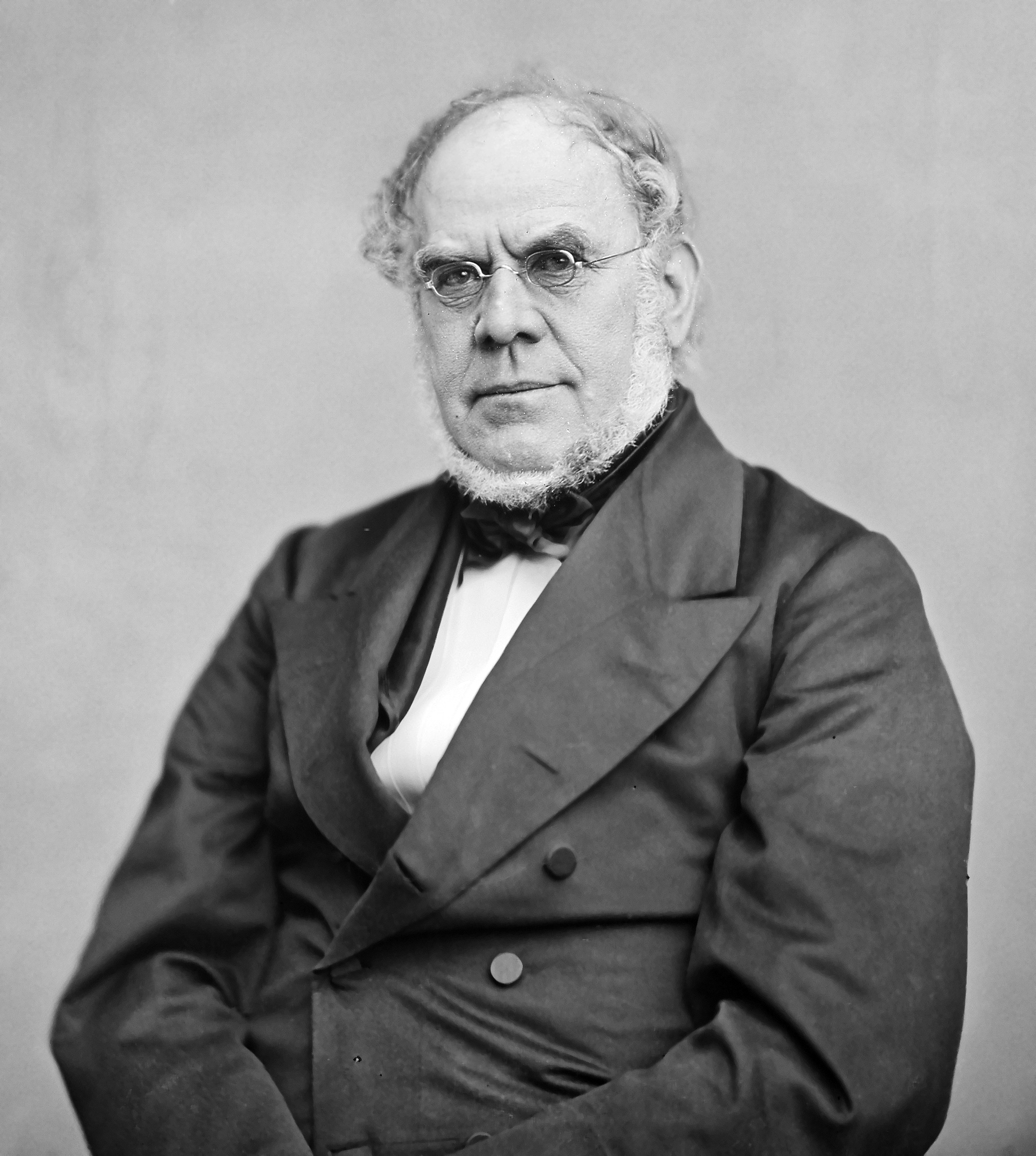
- Born: May 10, 1802; Schenectady, New York
- Died: December 31, 1889 (aged 87); Montrose, New Jersey
- Education: Columbia University
- Occupation: Civil engineer
- Board member of: Erie Railroad; American Society of Civil Engineers

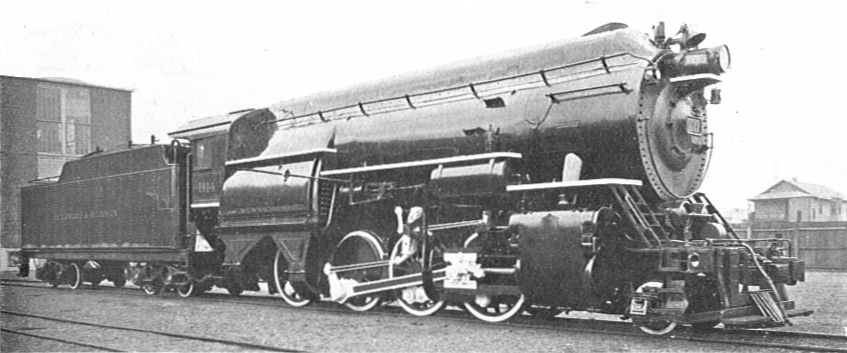
D&H high-pressure locomotive Horatio Allen, of 1924

Horatio Allen (May 10, 1802 – December 31, 1889) was an American civil engineer and inventor, and President of Erie Railroad in the year 1843–1844.

== Biography ==
Born in Schenectady, New York, he graduated from Columbia University in 1823, where he was a member of the Philolexian Society, and was appointed Assistant Engineer of the Delaware and Hudson Canal Company (precursor to the railroad). In 1827 he quit the Canal Company and went to England to study the emerging rail road technology, particularly locomotives. He was therefore asked to arrange for the construction of 3 locomotives for the Canal Company's projected railway (as per his June 25, 1880 letter to the editor of the New York Times). There he made the acquaintance of engineer George Stephenson. In 1829 he operated the first steam locomotive, one of the ones he ordered for the D&H, to run in America, the Stourbridge Lion, which ran successfully at Honesdale, Pennsylvania on August 8, 1829.

From 1829 to 1834 he was the chief engineer of the South Carolina Canal and Rail Road Company, at that time the longest railway in the world (about 136 miles/218 km). He was the inventor of the so-called "swiveling truck" for railway cars. He wrote The Railroad Era: First Five Years of its Development (1884).

In his other activities, from 1838 to 1842 he was principal assistant engineer of the Croton Aqueduct, the major water supply system for New York City; in 1842 he became connected with the Novelty Iron Works, a major builder of marine steam and other engines; at various times chief engineer and president of the Erie Railway; consulting engineer for the Panama Railway and the Brooklyn Bridge; and in 1872 and 1873 was president of the American Society of Civil Engineers. He died on December 31 1889 in New Jersey

In 1924 the Delaware and Hudson Railway built its first experimental high-pressure locomotive, No. 1400 and named it "Horatio Allen".

== Publications ==
- Allen, Horatio (November 1953). "Diary of Horatio Allen 1828 (England)". Railway and Locomotive Historical Society Bulletin. 89 (89): 97–138. JSTOR 43520168.
- M. N. Forney, Memoir of Horatio Allen (reprinted from the Railroad and Engineering Journal)

== See also ==
- List of railroad executives

Business positions
Preceded by William Maxwell	President of Erie Railroad; 1843–1844	Succeeded by Eleazer Lord
