= List of museums in the West Midlands =

This list of museums in the West Midlands, England contains museums which are defined for this context as institutions (including nonprofit organizations, government entities, and private businesses) that collect and care for objects of cultural, artistic, scientific, or historical interest and make their collections or related exhibits available for public viewing. Also included are non-profit art galleries and university art galleries. Museums that exist only in cyberspace (i.e., virtual museums) are not included.

Name	Image	Town/City	Region	Type	Summary
Aston Hall		Aston	Birmingham	Historic house	17th century Jacobean-style mansion with period rooms featuring furniture, paintings, textiles and metalwork from the collections of the Birmingham Museum & Art Gallery
Aston Manor Road Transport Museum		Aston	Birmingham	Transport	Closed, pending relocation
Avery Historical Museum		Smethwick	Sandwell	Industry	collection of weighing machines and artefacts, located at the Avery Weigh-Tronix headquarters
Bantock House Museum and Park		Finchfield	Wolverhampton	Historic house	18th-century house, ground floor furnished to reflect the Edwardian era, upper floor displays of important local people, industries, decorative arts, two Victorian period rooms, gardens
Barber Institute of Fine Arts		Birmingham	Birmingham	Art	Art gallery and concert hall, collection includes British art, French impressionism and post-impressionism, sculpture, portrait miniatures, decorative arts, coins, part of the University of Birmingham
Berkswell Museum		Berkswell	Solihull	Local	local history
Bilston Craft Gallery		Bilston	Wolverhampton	Art	Contemporary crafts and decorative arts
Birmingham Back to Backs		Birmingham	Birmingham	Historic house	Operated by the National Trust, city's last surviving court of back-to-back houses, reflects life from the 1840s to 1970s
Birmingham Gun Barrel Proof House		Birmingham	Birmingham	Military	Site for testing small arms and ammunition, features a museum with small arms and ammunition and the history of their development, open by appointment
Birmingham Museum & Art Gallery		Birmingham	Birmingham	Multiple	Art, local history, decorative arts, archaeology, coins, costumes, ceramics
Bishop Asbury Cottage		Great Barr	Sandwell	Historic house	18th century period cottage, boyhood home of Francis Asbury, the first American Methodist Bishop
Black Country Living Museum		Dudley	Dudley	Living	Recreated 19th and early 20th century industrial village with historic buildings moved from other sites, includes buses and other transport vehicles, fun fair, historic shops and industry displays
Blakesley Hall		Yardley	Birmingham	Historic house	Late 16th century Tudor timber-framed farmhouse, branch museum of the Birmingham Museums & Art Gallery
Cadbury World		Bournville	Birmingham	Food	History of chocolate and the Cadbury confectionery company
Centre of the Earth		Birmingham	Birmingham	Natural history	Nature centre used for environmental education
Coventry Watch Museum		Coventry	Coventry	Horology	planned museum about watches and watch-making, currently provide exhibitions
Coventry Music Museum		Coventry	Coventry	Music	museum highlighting the musical heritage of Coventry
Coventry Transport Museum		Coventry	Coventry	Transportation	British-made road transport including cars, commercial vehicles, motorcycles, bicycles
The Drum		Birmingham	Birmingham	Art	Arts centre for Black British and British Asian arts
Earlswood Village Museum		Earlswood	Solihull	Local	local history
Haden Hill House		Cradley Heath	Sandwell	Historic house	Victorian gentleman's house furnished in period style
Herbert Art Gallery and Museum		Coventry	Coventry	Multiple	Art, local history, culture, natural history, city's medieval, Victorian and modern history
Ikon Gallery		Birmingham	Birmingham	Art	Contemporary art
International Project Space		Bournville	Birmingham	Art	Contemporary art gallery, part of the Bournville Centre for Visual Arts
Jaguar Daimler Heritage Trust Museum		Coventry	Coventry	Automotive	historic Jaguar cars and racing cars
The Lace Guild		Stourbridge	Dudley	Textiles	Historic and contemporary lace and lace-related artefacts
Stourbridge Glass Museum		Stourbridge	Dudley	glass	
Lapworth Museum of Geology		Edgbaston	Birmingham	Natural history	Fossils, minerals, rocks, operated by the University of Birmingham
Locksmith's House		Willenhall	Walsall	Locks	Dedicated to a lock-making family and locally made locks
mac		Edgbaston	Birmingham	Art	Theatre, Cinema, Cafe and Public Space with Exhibit Gallery
Midland Air Museum		Baginton	Coventry	Transportation	Aircraft Museum including Frank Whittle Jet Heritage Centre
Museum of the Jewellery Quarter		Birmingham	Birmingham	Historic site	Historic jewellery-making factory, branch museum of the Birmingham Museums & Art Gallery
National Motorcycle Museum		Bickenhill	Solihull	Transportation	British motorcycles
New Art Gallery Walsall		Walsall	Walsall	Art	Collections include sculptures and paintings by modern masters including a large selection of work by Jacob Epstein
New Hall Mill		Walmley	Birmingham	Mill	18th century watermill, located in New Hall Valley Country Park
Oak House		West Bromwich	Sandwell	Historic house	Late 16th century half-timbered Yeoman's farmhouse with Tudor and Jacobean furniture
The Pen Museum		Birmingham	Birmingham	Industry	History of the pen making industry in Birmingham including the companies, different kinds of pens, early typewriters and Braille machines, writing in general
Periscope		Edgbaston	Birmingham	Art	Artist-run contemporary art gallery and event space
Priory Visitor Centre		Coventry	Coventry	Archaeology	artifacts and history of St Mary's Priory
Red House Cone		Wordsley	Dudley	Art	Former glassworks, exhibits of historic and contemporary glass, glass-making workshops
Royal Birmingham Society of Artists		Birmingham	Birmingham	Art	Gallery exhibits of members' works
Sarehole Mill		Hall Green	Birmingham	Mill	18th century water mill used for grinding corn and later producing metal, includes 19th century bakehouse, exhibits on local resident J. R. R. Tolkien, branch museum of the Birmingham Museums & Art Gallery
Selly Manor		Bournville	Birmingham	Historic	Two Tudor period timber-framed houses
Soho House		Handsworth	Birmingham	Historic house	Late 18th century period Georgian home of industrialist Matthew Boulton, branch museum of the Birmingham Museums & Art Gallery
Solihull Gallery		Solihull	Solihull	Art	
Thinktank		Birmingham	Birmingham	Science	Themes include future technology, innovation, space travel, current technology and scientific understanding on everyday life, natural history, biology, city's industrial and transportation history
Tipton Community Heritage Centre		Tipton	Sandwell	Local	located in the town library, local history, industry, canals, social history
Tyseley Locomotive Works		Birmingham	Birmingham	Railway	Railway depot, workshops, engines and artefacts, viewing on open days
VIVID		Birmingham	Birmingham	Art	Gallery for media arts
Walsall Leather Museum		Walsall	Walsall	Industry	Former Victorian leather factory, history of the local leather and saddle-making trades
Warwick Arts Centre		Coventry	Coventry	Art	Multi-venue arts complex at the University of Warwick, events in contemporary and classical music, drama, dance, comedy, films and visual art
Wednesbury Museum and Art Gallery		Wednesbury	Sandwell	Multiple	Fine art, decorative arts including Ruskin Pottery, toys and games, local history
West Midlands Fire Service Heritage Museum		Aston	Birmingham	Fire fighting	
West Midlands Police Museum		Sparkhill	Birmingham	Law enforcement	Uniforms, vehicles, photographs, badges, whistles, memorabilia, history of police work in the region
Wightwick Manor		Wightwick	Wolverhampton	Historic house	Operated by the National Trust, Victorian period manor with Arts & Crafts interiors and Pre-Raphaelite art
Wolverhampton Art Gallery		Wolverhampton	Wolverhampton	Art	Collection includes fine art and decorative arts from the Georgian and Victorian eras, Pop Art, works from Northern Ireland, Asian decorative arts

== Defunct museums ==
- Broadfield House Glass Museum, Kingswinford, closed in 2015
- Coventry City Farm, closed in 2008
- Coventry Toy Museum, Coventry, closed in 2007
- Dudley Museum and Art Gallery, closed in 2016
- Galton Valley Canal Heritage Centre, Smethwick
- Jerome K. Jerome Museum, Walsall, currently seeking new facility
- Museum of Science and Industry, Birmingham, closed in 1997, many exhibits now at Thinktank, Birmingham
- Walsall Museum, closed in 2015

== See also ==
- Category:Tourist attractions in the West Midlands (county)
