= Wordsley =

Coordinates: 52.483°N 2.150°W

- Location within the West Midlands
- Population: 12,582 (2011 Ward)
  - Density: 43.1 per ha
- Metropolitan borough: Dudley
- Metropolitan county: West Midlands
- Region: West Midlands
- Country: England
- Sovereign state: United Kingdom
- Post town: STOURBRIDGE
- Postcode district: DY8
- Dialling code: 01384
- Police: West Midlands
- Fire: West Midlands
- Ambulance: West Midlands
- UK Parliament: Kingswinford and South Staffordshire

Wordsley is a suburban village in Stourbridge, which is in the West Midlands, England. It is part of the Metropolitan Borough of Dudley and is north of the River Stour. Wordsley is part of the Kingswinford and South Staffordshire Parliamentary constituency as of 2024. It is bordered by open Staffordshire countryside to the west, Kingswinford to the north, Brierley Hill to the east and Stourbridge to the south.

== History ==
Wordsley lies in the far south of the historic boundaries of Staffordshire and, with neighbouring Amblecote, it is one of several urban villages just north of the River Stour that forms the historic border with the county of Worcestershire to the south. It historically formed part of the extensive manor of Kingswinford.

'Monarch's Way', A 610-mile (982 km) long-distance footpath runs nearby. The path loosely follows the escape of the future Charles II during the Third English Civil War. He is said to have stopped at a house (which has since been demolished) on the corner of Kinver Street and the main Stourbridge road in Wordsley, during the night following the Battle of Worcester on 3 September 1651, and taken bread and beer for himself and his party of about 60 cavaliers.

There were numerous glassworks in Wordsley from 1776 until 1930, making artisan-created cut glass items such as vases, glasses and objets-d'art. The famous replica of the Roman Portland Vase was cut in Wordsley. One of the most famous glass designers was a Wordsley man, William Jabez Muckley. Another was John Northwood, and his son Harry C. Northwood who helped establish glassware in the USA. Yet another who established glassware in the USA was John Northwood's friend, Frederick Carder. One of the most accomplished glasscutters was George Woodall, whose campaign led to the building of the Wordsley School of Art. The 'Red House Glassworks', a 100-foot high glassmaking cone, survives and has recently been restored. Lead-crystal cut-glass from Wordsley's heyday is now rare and collectable. Glassworking continued in the area, albeit at a reduced scale, until the 1990s.

Wordsley was the headquarters of the Royal seedsmen, Webbs of Wordsley. Their grounds covered thousands of acres.

A Workhouse was opened at Wordsley in 1903 and became fully operational in 1907, becoming a military hospital during World War I (1914–1918) but became Wordsley Hospital, a civilian hospital, after the end of World War II in 1945. The buildings had been extended during its time as a military hospital but it was further expanded afterwards, the final extension being a state-of-the-art maternity unit that opened in 1988. However, the hospital closed in 2005 with its services being moved to an expanded Russells Hall Hospital in Dudley. Most of the buildings were demolished in 2007 to make way for housing, but parts of the hospital were saved for conversion into housing. These include the chapel, the mortuary and the old workhouse buildings.

== Places of interest ==
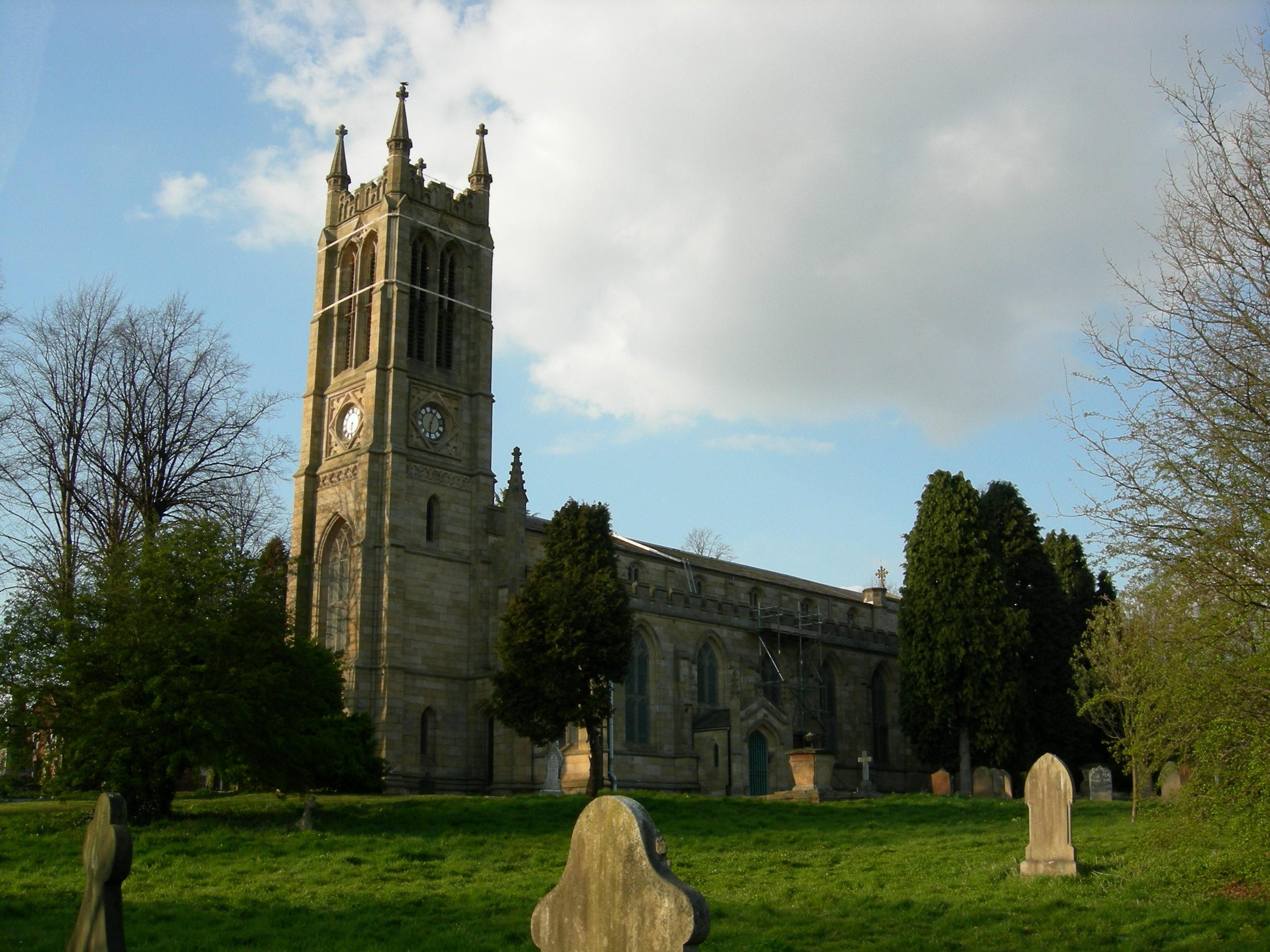
Holy Trinity Church, Wordsley

This church is the Holy Trinity Church in Wordsley which was consecrated in 1831, replacing St. Mary. Construction had begun 1828 following the donation of land from the Earl of Dudley. The building was designed by architect Lewis Vulliamy. This replaced the ancient parish church at Kingswinford, which was reopened in 1846, initially as a chapel of ease.

Much of the historic fabric of the village has been subject to demolition over the decades. Victorian terraced housing, shops and glassworker cottages - now so valued elsewhere - were replaced en masse by large housing estates built either in the 1960s modernist style or the 1990s Barratt style. Village buildings that were formerly highly notable fine relics of the Victorian and Edwardian era, such as the Wordsley Hospital and the Wordsley School of Art, have recently been demolished or redeveloped.

Wordsley Hospital closed in 2005, with its functions being transferred to Russells Hall Hospital. Some of the less significant buildings were demolished in 2007, but most of the older buildings are being refurbished and incorporated into the new housing development.

The fine Wordsley School of Art, built in 1899 had fallen into disrepair and was demolished at the end of 2000. The first instructor at the school was Frederick Carder, a glass designer. The building had not been used since the Community Association moved to new premises at The Green in the 1970s. The Broadfield House Glass Museum salvaged two granite plaques which were laid down when the school was completed in 1898 and extended in 1906. The school's site remains empty and overgrown.

In 2006, a row of dilapidated shops at the junction of High Street and Brierley Hill Road were cleared, and plans were announced to widen the often congested road system at this point. New apartments were built on the plot and completed in 2008. There is concern that this, and other major homes schemes in the area, will lead to much-increased traffic problems on the High Street.

Stuart's Glass Works, a grade II listed building, came under pressure from sales of cheaper imported glass and the business there closed in March 2002. The site was redeveloped and its Newhouse Building opened as the Stourbridge Glass Museum in 2022 while the Mill Buildings have been converted into commercial units and apartments. The nearby historic Red House Cone is also preserved as a museum and visitor centre with a craft centre.

== Transport ==
The A491 road passes through Wordsley, being originally a prehistoric track.

Wordsley is served by several bus routes operated by National Express West Midlands and Diamond West Midlands.

National Route 54 of the National Cycle Network passes a mile to the south-east.

The navigable Staffordshire & Worcestershire Canal passes a mile to the west, and the Stourbridge Canal just to the west, descending in a flight of locks that passes beside the Red House glass cone.

The nearest rail station is Stourbridge Town, just under two miles from Wordsley, which is the only station on the Stourbridge Town Branch Line, a branch off the main Birmingham to Worcester via Kidderminster Line.

== Culture and arts ==
Wordsley is home to the Dudley Music Centre, a respected local facility for the teaching and performance of music. There are two major theatre groups operating from Wordsley: Wordsley Amateur Dramatics Society, and G.I.S.T. The contemporary poet Gary Bills was born at Wordsley Hospital, and attended Lawnswood primary School and The Buckpool School, now known as the Wordsley School.

== Education ==
Wordsley is home to four primary schools, one secondary school and one Special Educational Needs school (SEN).

=== Primary schools ===
- Ashwood Park Primary School
- Belle Vue Primary School
- Brook Primary School
- Fairhaven Primary School

=== Secondary school ===
- The Wordsley School (formally The Buckpool School)

=== SEN School ===
- Pens Meadow school

== Guiding ==
Wordsley is also home to 5th Wordsley Guide on a Thursday night at the Wordsley Community Centre.

== Notable residents ==
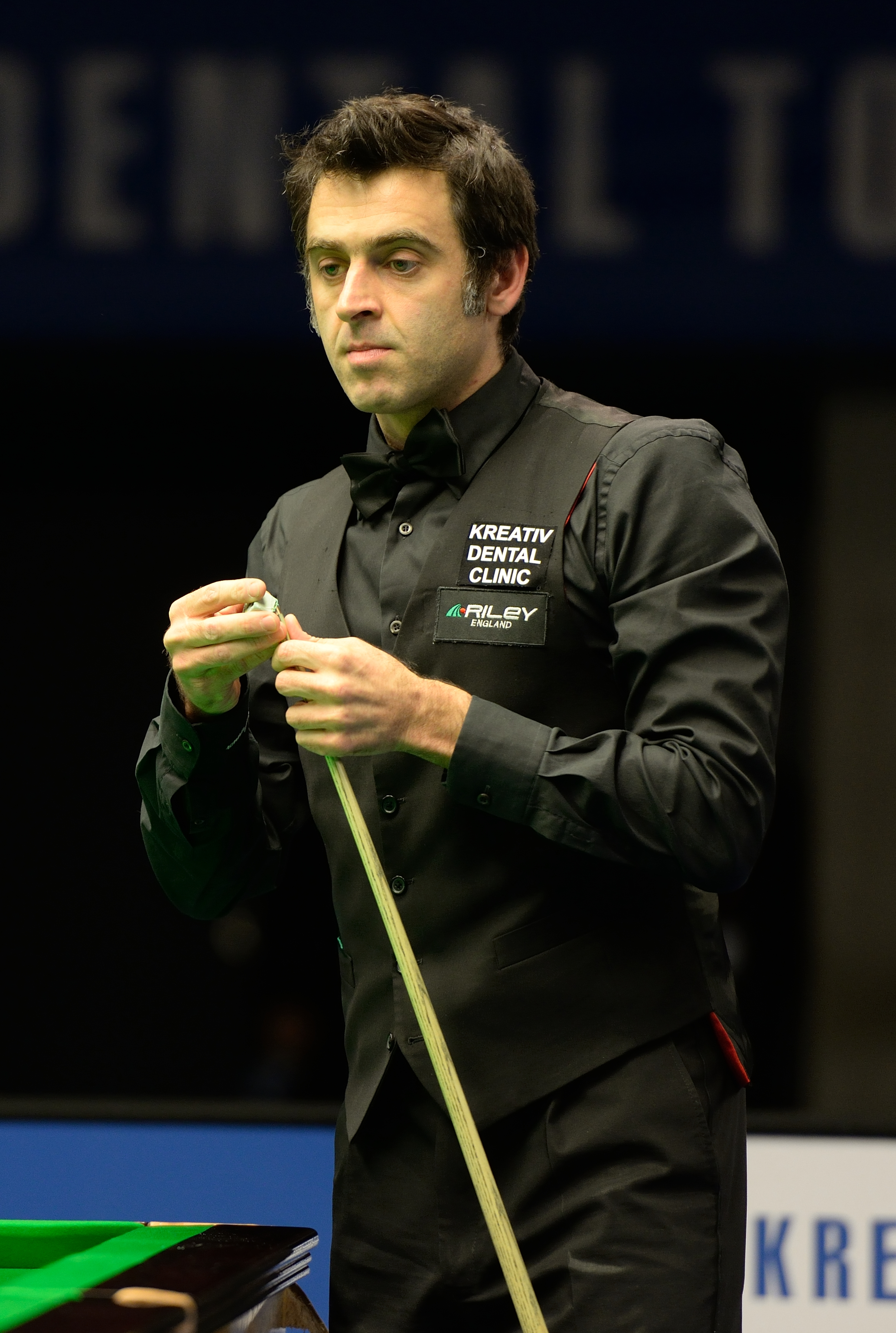
Ronnie O'Sullivan, 2015

- William Jabez Muckley (1829 – 1905), artist and Glass cutter
- Edward Webb and Sons (ca. 1850), seed merchants or seedsmen
- Dolly Allen (1906 – 1990), comedian, singer and performer
- Beth Sherburn (born 1991), an English singer and songwriter.

=== Sport ===
- Bert Hall (1882 – 1957), footballer who played 214 games for Aston Villa
- Don Kenyon (1924 – 1996), first-class cricketer, who played 8 tests for England and 643 first-class games
- Brian Farmer (1933 – 2014), footballer who played 249 games, including 117 for Birmingham City
- Dean Peer (born 1969), footballer who played over 350 games, including 120 for Birmingham City
- Gavin Haynes (born 1969), retired cricketer who played 100 first-class games
- Martin Butler (born 1974), footballer who played 458 games including 118 games in 2 spells at Walsall
- Ronnie O'Sullivan OBE (born 1975), professional snooker player
- Tyler Denny (born 1991), boxer, former European middleweight champion.
- Ben Cox (born 1992), Worcestershire County Cricket Club wicketkeeper, played 166 first class games
- Sam Mantom (born 1992), former footballer, played over 300 games, 110 for Walsall
- Felicity Pickard (born 1994), para table tennis player, bronze medallist at the 2024 Summer Paralympics
- Adam Finch (born 2000), cricketer, played 33 first-class games
- Ben Healy (born 2000), cyclist, stage winner and yellow jersey wearer in the 2025 Tour de France
