= Claude Rigby =

Irish cricketer and radiologist

Personal information
- Full name: Claude Mallinson Rigby
- Born: 29 March 1882; Dublin, Ireland
- Died: 29 January 1960 (aged 77); Middleton-on-Sea, Sussex, England
- Batting: Unknown
- Bowling: Unknown

Career statistics
Competition	First-class
Matches	2
Runs scored	2
Batting average	1.00
100s/50s	–/–
Top score	2*
Balls bowled	12
Wickets	0
Bowling average	–
5 wickets in innings	–
10 wickets in match	–
Best bowling	–
Catches/stumpings	–/–
- Source: ESPNcricinfo, 29 November 2018

Claude Mallinson Rigby MRCS, LRCP, DRME (29 March 1882 – 29 January 1960) was an Irish first-class cricketer and radiologist.

Rigby was born at Dublin in March 1882, and was educated in England at Dulwich College, before studying medicine at the London Hospital Medical College. He qualified in 1907, and joined the British Army in 1908, enslisting as a Lieutenant on probation in the Royal Army Medical Corps. He was posted to British India, where he served as the chief surgeon of the Governor of Bombay, The Lord Willingdon from 1915–1918. He served as the chief surgeon for Lord Rawlinson from 1921–1923, when he was Commander-in-Chief, India. While in British India, Rigby played two first-class cricket matches for the aforementioned Lord Willingdon's XI, playing twice against the Maharaja of Cooch-Behar's XI in 1918 at Bombay in March, and Poona in August.

When he returned to England, he entered into the field of radiology, where he worked at the Cambridge Military Hospital, Aldershot He retired from the military in 1928, with the rank of Major. Upon retiring from the military, Rigby worked as a radiologist in civilian hospitals in the Midlands. He worked at various hospitals in the Midlands, including the Royal Hospital, Guest Hospital, Corbett Hospital, and the Staffordshire General Infirmary. Rigby was recalled to the Royal Army Medical Corps during World War II. Outside of cricket and his medical career, Rigby played tennis, golf and rugby union as pastimes. He retired to Middleton-on-Sea in Sussex, where he died in January 1960. He was survived by his wife, Mary, and their daughter.
