= Scoring knife =

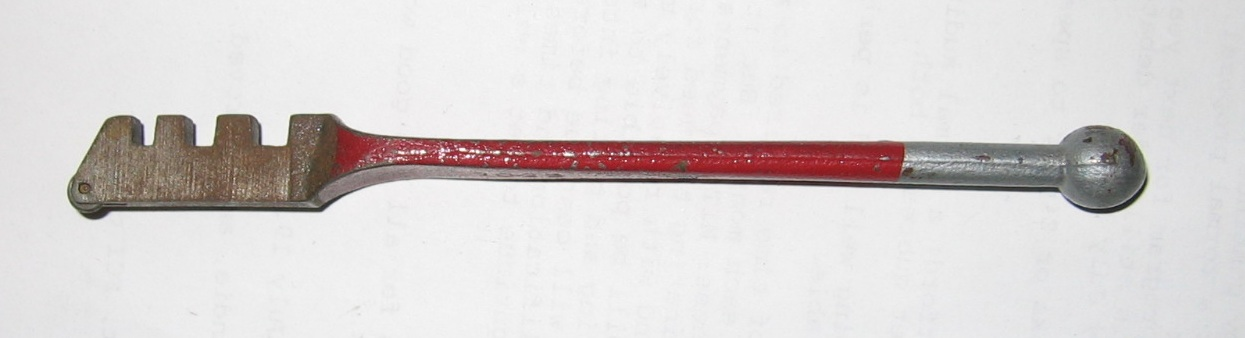
A glass cutter is a type of scoring tool specialized for cutting glass.

A scoring knife or scoring tool is a handheld tool used to cut a groove in a sheet of material. The cutting edge of the knife is often made of hard material such tungsten carbide.

The scoring knife is drawn across the material in a straight line (with the help of a straightedge), creating a scratch or score in the sheet. The material can then be broken or severed along the groove, resulting in a straight and smooth cut.

Scoring knives can be used to cut various materials, including glass, tile, plexiglas, and other hard materials. For softer materials like plexiglas, a razor blade can be used as a scoring tool.

== See also ==
- Glass cutter
