= Beth Sherburn =

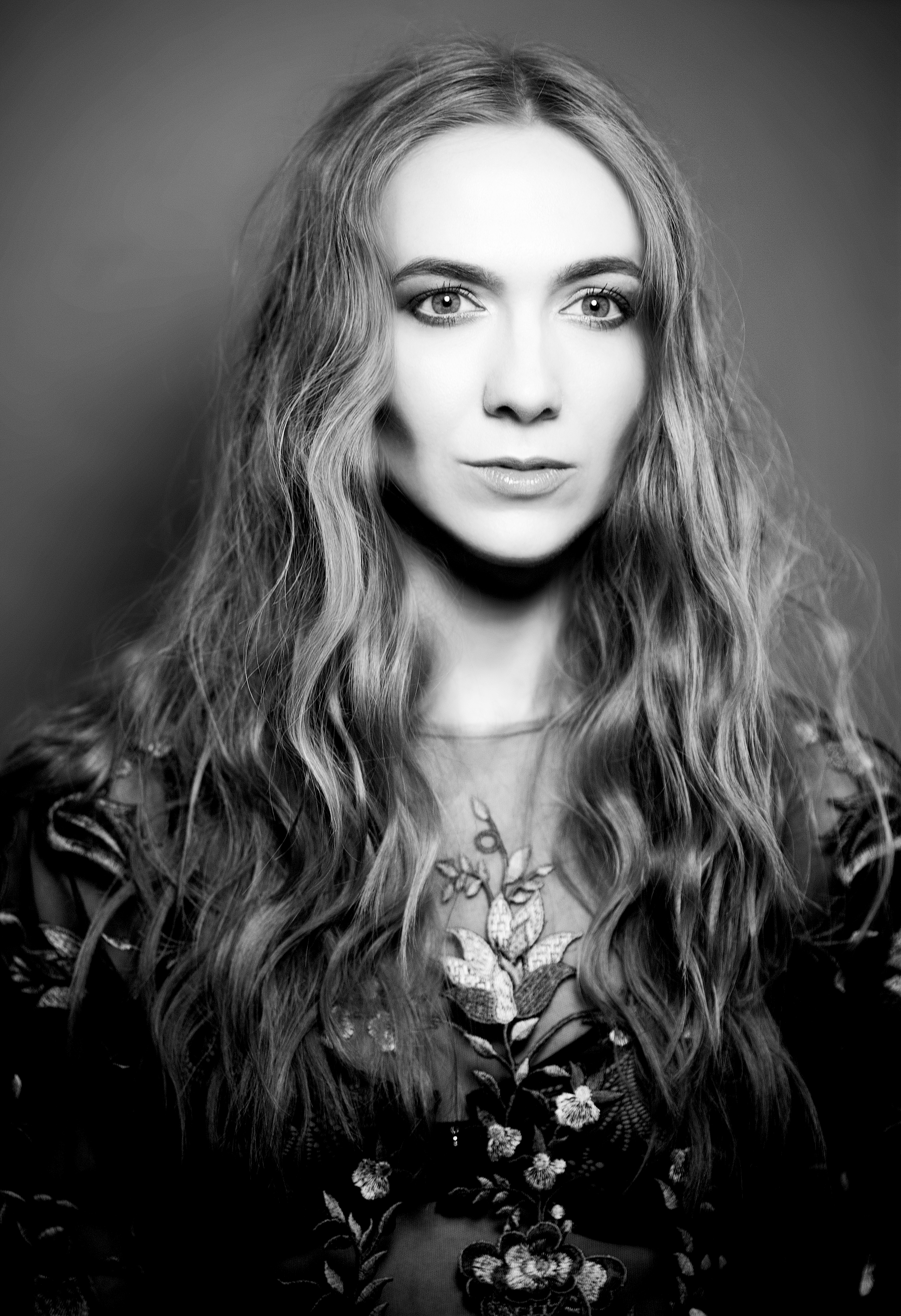
- Born: Beth Sherburn; 11 January 1991 (age 35); Wordsley, West Midlands, England
- Occupations: Singer, songwriter, model
- Musical career
- Genres: Pop, dance
- Instruments: Singing, piano, guitar
- Website: bethsherburn.com

Beth Marie Sherburn (born 11 January 1991) is an English singer and songwriter. In 2013, she performed for Prince Andrew at a live event, performing a mixture of original material and cover songs.

Sherburn released her debut single, "Joker", in 2014, which allegedly featured rapper Lil Wayne. Later that year, Sherburn supported the Saturdays on their 12-date Greatest Hits Live! tour of the United Kingdom, including a live performance of the single at Stafford Grammar School, which increased her popularity in the area significantly. She performed her first headline show in 2016 at The Hare and Hounds pub in Birmingham. Later in 2016, Sherburn released her second single, "YOLO", which was subsequently remixed by the Wideboys and played on Kiss FM.

== Early life ==
Beth Marie Sherburn was born in Wordsley. From 1995 to 2002 she attended the Straits Primary School. It was here that she realised she wanted to pursue a career in music, after being offered the opportunity by her headmaster to give a rendition of Celine Dion's "Falling into You" at a nearby secondary school. She remembers, "I was such a quiet girl back then, the music definitely brought me out of my shell".

From 2002 to 2009 Sherburn attended secondary school at Ellowes Hall School. During her time there, she became involved in school choirs and musical productions, playing lead roles in Les Misérables, Fiddler on the Roof, The Sound of Music and Oliver!, in addition to performing in Disneyland Paris.

Sherburn took lessons in singing and piano, and reached ABRSM Grades 7 and 5 respectively. She was eleven when she entered her first singing competition, touring the UK with the Gospel Youth Choir and Let's Sing Choir, and performing at UK concert halls including the Royal Albert Hall, Birmingham Symphony Hall, Barclaycard Arena, Sheffield Arena and the Manchester Arena, supporting Katherine Jenkins and Heather Small.

In 2008, Sherburn performed as "the little cabin boy" alongside Matthew Kelly and George Costigan in a musical production of Don Quixote, directed by Chris Bond. She also performed at Birmingham Symphony Hall, giving a rendition of Barbra Streisand's "How Do You Keep the Music Playing?".

Sherburn won the National Songwriters' Competition. Robin Gibb, of the Bee Gees, was on the judging panel, and remarked that Sherburn's songwriting reminded him of when he used to write songs with his brothers. Sherburn performed her song "Starbucks Town" as part of this competition.

Between 2010 and 2012, Sherburn worked with British guitarist and songwriter K. K. Downing of Judas Priest.

In December 2012, UK record producer John McLaughlin approached Sherburn after overhearing her sing Michael Bublé's "Christmas" at the perfume counter in Debenhams. She was given a £250,000 record deal and was invited to record at his studios in Bath. The following year, Sherburn travelled to Los Angeles, Norway, and Poland, to develop her songwriting ability. It was in Norway that she began to record demos, and began writing and working with the Walt Disney Company.

== Career ==
=== 2012–2013: Early career ===
In 2012, Sherburn released a dance cover of Duran Duran's "Ordinary World", which she created with producer John McLaughlin. It charted at No. 8 in the UK Club Charts. Shortly after, she released "Overload", produced by Jud Mahoney, with a radio edit being mixed by The Alias.

Sherburn sang with her band at an event before Prince Andrew in 2013, performing a mixture of her own original material and cover songs.

=== 2014–2015: "Joker", The Saturdays and charity work ===
Lil Wayne is featured on her debut single, "Joker", which was released in 2014. The accompanying music video was directed by Carly Cussen. The track itself was played on Capital FM and various BBC radio stations, and was mentioned in UK magazines such as OK!, NOW and Music Weekly.

She performed at a Shopcade pop-up event at London Fashion Week and Pride London, where she headlined the main stage performing alongside Pixie Lott, Conor Maynard, Anastacia, Foxes and Katy B.

Later the same year, Sherburn flew to Poland to perform alongside DJ and producer, Leon Lour. Here, she sang "Use That Body", "Stamp on It" and "Joker". Sherburn supported The Saturdays on their Greatest Hits Live! tour later in 2014.

Sherburn performed at several further events in 2014 including the British motorcycle Grand Prix, the Inspiration Awards for Women, and the Breakthrough Cup.

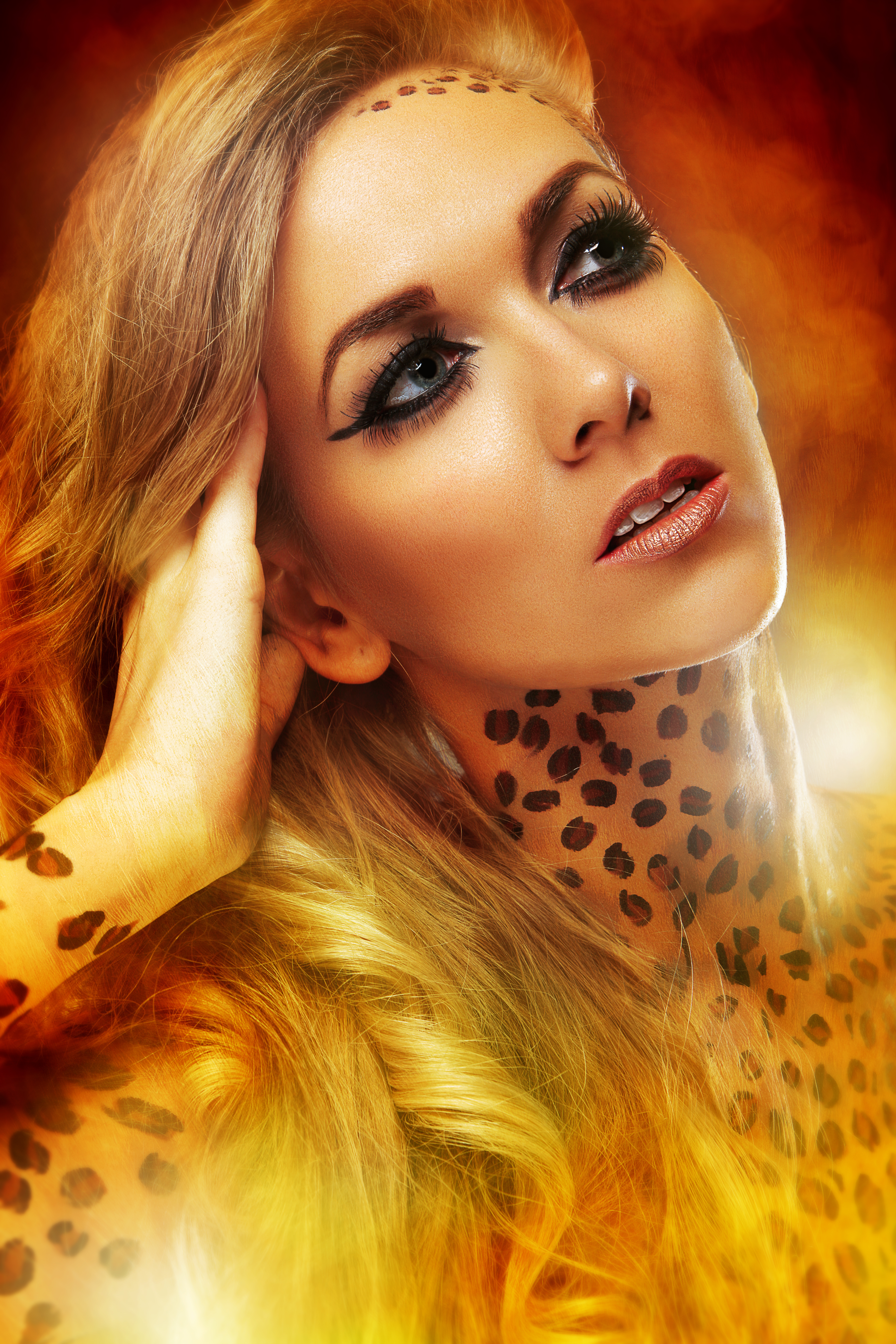
Beth Sherburn

In 2015 Sherburn began partaking in a number of events for charity, beginning with an abseil down Fort Dunlop in Birmingham in March to raise money for Red Nose Day. She overcame her fear of heights and successfully completed the abseil, which was filmed live by the BBC. In June of the same year, Sherburn joined other celebrities including Belinda Fenty (The Island), Stevi Ritchie (The X Factor) and Richard Burr (The Great British Bake Off) for the Santander Cycles bicycle race at Jupiter London Nocturne around Smithfield Market. Sherburn has raised a total of over £30,000 for charity to date.

In December 2015, Sherburn released a Christmas single called "Snow Angels", co-written with Eaton. All money raised from the single was donated to the Make-A-Wish Foundation. Sherburn performed the single at the Dot Com Children's Foundation Fundraising Ball held at Mansion House, accompanied by a dance by Strictly Come Dancing performers, Kristina Rihanoff and Robin Windsor.

In late 2015 she performed for year 7s at the prestigious London Academy and gave them all posters with her own unique signature.

=== 2016–present: "YOLO" and touring ===
In 2016, Sherburn performed her first headline show, at the Hare and Hounds in Birmingham. She released her second single, "YOLO", which she created with producer Ciaron Bell. "I was really happy with this song", Sherburn remarks. "One word sums this up to me: young! It feels like you're on a rollercoaster whilst listening to YOLO – there's so much going on, but that's what life's all about. YOLO relates to everyone. YOLO is about creating amazing memories with friends, finding love and having fun!" The track was remixed by The Wideboys.

In July, Sherburn performed with her band for MPs from the Conservative Party for a summer marquee. She covered a number of British songs, as well as singing some of her own material. Later that year, she performed songs from her as-yet-unreleased album at The Jazz House. In November 2016, Sherburn sang at the Genting Arena in Birmingham at the launch for Free Radio, as part of a line-up which included Little Mix, Olly Murs and Louisa Johnson. Sherburn supported Go West's concert at the Robin 2 in December that year, performing songs from her upcoming album, as well as covers of artists such as David Bowie and Sia.

== Artistry ==
=== Musical style ===
Sherburn creates music in dance and club styles. She cites numerous musical influences, including Sia, Michael Jackson, Barbra Streisand, Celine Dion, Emeli Sandé and Adele. Her associated acts include Lil Wayne, DJ Leon Lour, Steve Smart, Wideboys and Andi Durrant. She says of her style, "I love all genres of music but urban/pop would be my main music influence".

=== Songwriting ===
Sherburn wrote her debut single, "Joker", with producer John McLaughlin, and the track featured a rap from Lil Wayne. A long-term collaborator of Sherburn's is Chris Eaton, who has worked with her since she was twelve, and who produced and co-wrote Christmas charity single "Snow Angels" with her. Sherburn's second single from her EP, "YOLO", was co-written and produced by Ciaron Bell, and was later remixed by the Wideboys.

== Discography ==
=== Singles ===
- "Ordinary World" (2012), JM
- "Feel Like I Can Fly" (2012), JM
- "Overload" (2012), Purple Circle
- "Joker" ft. Lil Wayne (2014), Purple Circle
- "Snow Angels" (2015/2016), Beth Sherburn
- "YOLO" (2016), Purple Circle

== Touring ==
=== Headlining ===
- Beth Sherburn School Tour (2014–2016)

=== Supporting ===
- The Saturdays – Greatest Hits Live! (2014)
- Go West – The Robin (2016)
