= Dolly Allen =

English comedian, singer and performer

- Born: Doris Evelyn Baugh; 9 April 1906; Wordsley, Staffordshire, England
- Died: 25 June 1990 (aged 84)
- Occupations: Comedian, entertainer
- Years active: 1960s–1970s
- Spouse: Leonard Allen

Dolly Allen (9 April 1906 – 25 June 1990) was an English comedian, singer and performer. Born Doris Evelyn Baugh at Wordsley Workhouse in Staffordshire, she performed throughout her life and came to wider attention in 1975 at the age of 69 after joining the roster of performers in A Black Country Night Out. Dolly made television and radio appearances and continued to perform in venues around the Black Country, wider UK and abroad. She appeared on several comedy albums with the group and had her own solo release in 1978. Dolly was recognised for her contributions to entertainment by Dudley Council in 2008 with her own blue plaque.

== Early life ==
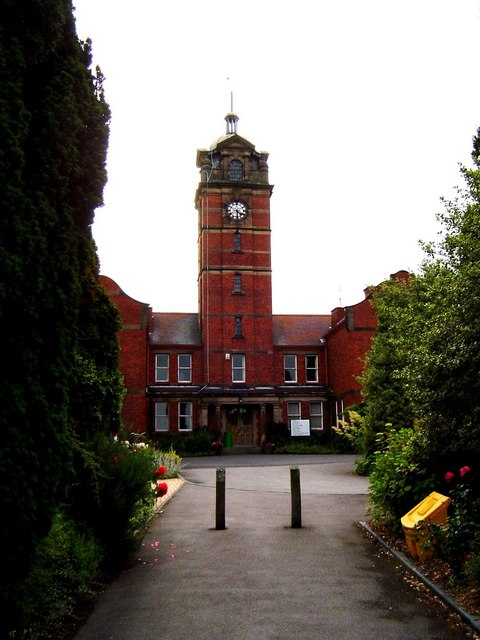
Dolly was born at Wordsley Workhouse, which later formed the central building of Wordsley Hospital (pictured, 2003)

Dolly Allen was born Doris Evelyn Baugh at Wordsley Workhouse on 9 April 1906. Her mother was a brickyard labourer who died ten days after the birth. Renamed Dorothy by her adoptive parents William and Elizabeth Parker, Dolly grew up in the nearby town of Halesowen.

Dolly later said that she loved performing from a young age, and as a child would dance in the street for travelling hurdy-gurdists. She would also entertain and sing to her friends, and she said that school staff would sometimes pay her a penny to sing to the other children. She later realised instead that she would "like to be funny".

While working at Hackett Brothers' Nut and Bolt Works in Halesowen, Dolly met Leonard Allen, and in 1926 the pair wed at Stourbridge Register Office. The first comedy routine that Dolly performed was in front of Hackett Brothers workers at their 1944 Christmas party.

== Performing career ==
Dolly performed her comedy routine from the 1950s, through the 1960s and 1970s at shows and in clubs around the Black Country area of the UK, while continuing to work as a cleaner after leaving Hackett Brothers. In 1975, when Dolly was 69, local promoter and host of A Black Country Night Out comedy show Ray Hingley invited her to join the show. An "instant hit" and a "big part" of the show, Dolly appeared with the group at venues over the next few years. Television and radio appearances followed, and Dolly performed on three comedy albums with the Black Country Night Out team from 1976 to 1978. Dolly also continued to perform in pubs and clubs as a solo act, and in 1978 recorded a self-titled solo comedy album. That year, she also toured Spanish Black Country expatriate communities with A Black Country Night Out.

Dolly was described by herself and others as shy when not on-stage, and the stories she told often featured her sister Fanny rather than herself. Ray Hingley said of her, "Off-stage Dolly was a quiet person. She used to sit in silence in my car on the way to shows—and would never tell us how old she was."

Dolly's opening catchphrase of "Hello, my luvvers" was just one part of her distinctive act. She also performed wearing a threadbare hat with a turkey feather sticking out the top. Dolly said she had performed in it since the 1950s after being gifted it by a friend; the hat had belonged to the friend's mother-in-law, who had recently died. Dolly obtained the feather from a turkey at a workplace social night and added it to the hat herself. As part of a profile of Dolly in 1976, Peter Green of current affairs TV show ATV Today called the addition of the hat a "turning point" in the evolution of her act.

With her "doleful expression" and "deadpan, timeless" delivery, Dolly was described as "the funniest woman in the Black Country—a teller of stories that reflect the rather macabre humour Black Country folk find in the unlikeliest situations".

Dolly died aged 84 on 25 June 1990. On 22 June 2008 Dudley Council erected a blue plaque in her honour at Brierley Hill Civic Hall. The unveiling was accompanied by a charity tribute show at the hall organised by fellow entertainers and former colleagues.

== Discography ==
Albums

- Black Country Night Out – Volume One – Broadside Records – 1976
- Black Country Night Out – Volume Two – Broadside Records – 1977
- An Evening With The Original Black Country Night Out Show – Broadside Records – 1978
- Dolly Allen – Broadside Records – 1978

Singles

- The Black Country Christmas Song – Beeswing Records, Zella Recording – 1979
