= Wordsley Hospital =

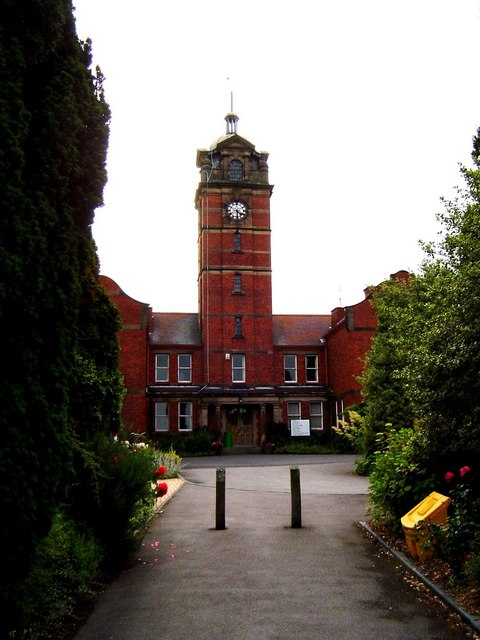
- Wordsley Hospital Clock Tower, 2003

- Shown in West Midlands

Geography
- Location: Wordsley, West Midlands, England
- Coordinates: 52.4851°N 2.1590°W

Organisation
- Care system: NHS

History
- Founded: 1904
- Closed: 2005

Links
- Lists: Hospitals in England

Wordsley Hospital was an NHS hospital located in Wordsley, near Stourbridge, West Midlands, England.

== History ==
The facility was built as part of the redevelopment of the Stourbridge workhouse between 1902 and 1904. It was extended in 1915 during the First World War to provide an annexe to the 1st Southern Military Hospital. Seven new wards were built during the Second World War.

Ridge Hill Hospital, which specialised in mental health, opened on an adjacent site in 1982.

At the beginning of the 1980s, Wordsley Hospital was chosen as the site of a new maternity unit to serve the whole Dudley borough and replacing the existing maternity wards at Wordsley as well as Burton Road Hospital in Dudley and Mary Stevens Maternity Home in Stourbridge. Construction work on the new 118-bed maternity unit began during 1985. The maternity unit was officially opened by the Duchess of Gloucester on 24 November 1988.

However, in the early 1990s plans were unveiled for Wordsley Hospital, Guest Hospital and parts of the Corbett Hospital to be closed and the services relocated to an expanded Russells Hall Hospital. Local MP Ian Pearson was at the centre of a campaign to try to keep at least some services, particularly the maternity unit, at Wordsley. There was much outrage in the local community at the decision to close Wordsley Hospital, with the closure of the Corbett Hospital and Guest Hospital attracting similar condemnation from the local community.

The first phase of Wordsley Hospital's closure took place on 7 January 2005, when the maternity unit closed after just under 17 years in use and was relocated to Russells Hall. The last services at Wordsley were relocated on 22 April 2005.

The sale of the site was agreed in March 2005 (when some services were still at the hospital) when Mar City Developments purchased it for £14.75 million with a view for redeveloping it for housing.

== Redevelopment ==
A new facility at Ridge Hill Hospital was officially opened on 18 October 2006 by local MP Ian Pearson. Some of the original Ridge Hill Hospital buildings are still in use, although others were demolished in 2007 and several are still standing disused. The road link to Wordsley Hospital was severed when the bulk of the Wordsley buildings were demolished in 2007.

12 homes on Ashdown Drive, which had been built in the 1960s and housed doctors and nurses at the hospital until its closure, were finally put up for sale by the local health trust in December 2010, nearly six years after the hospital closed.

== Baby snatch incident ==
On 6 May 2002, a newborn baby girl was snatched from the unit by a local woman who had recently suffered a miscarriage. She was recovered seven hours later. It was later revealed that CCTV cameras at the maternity unit were not working when the baby was snatched.
