= William Jabez Muckley =

British painter

- Born: 23 March 1829; Wordsley
- Died: 30 August 1905 (aged 76); Witham, Essex
- Education: Birmingham School of Art
- Father: Jabez Muckley

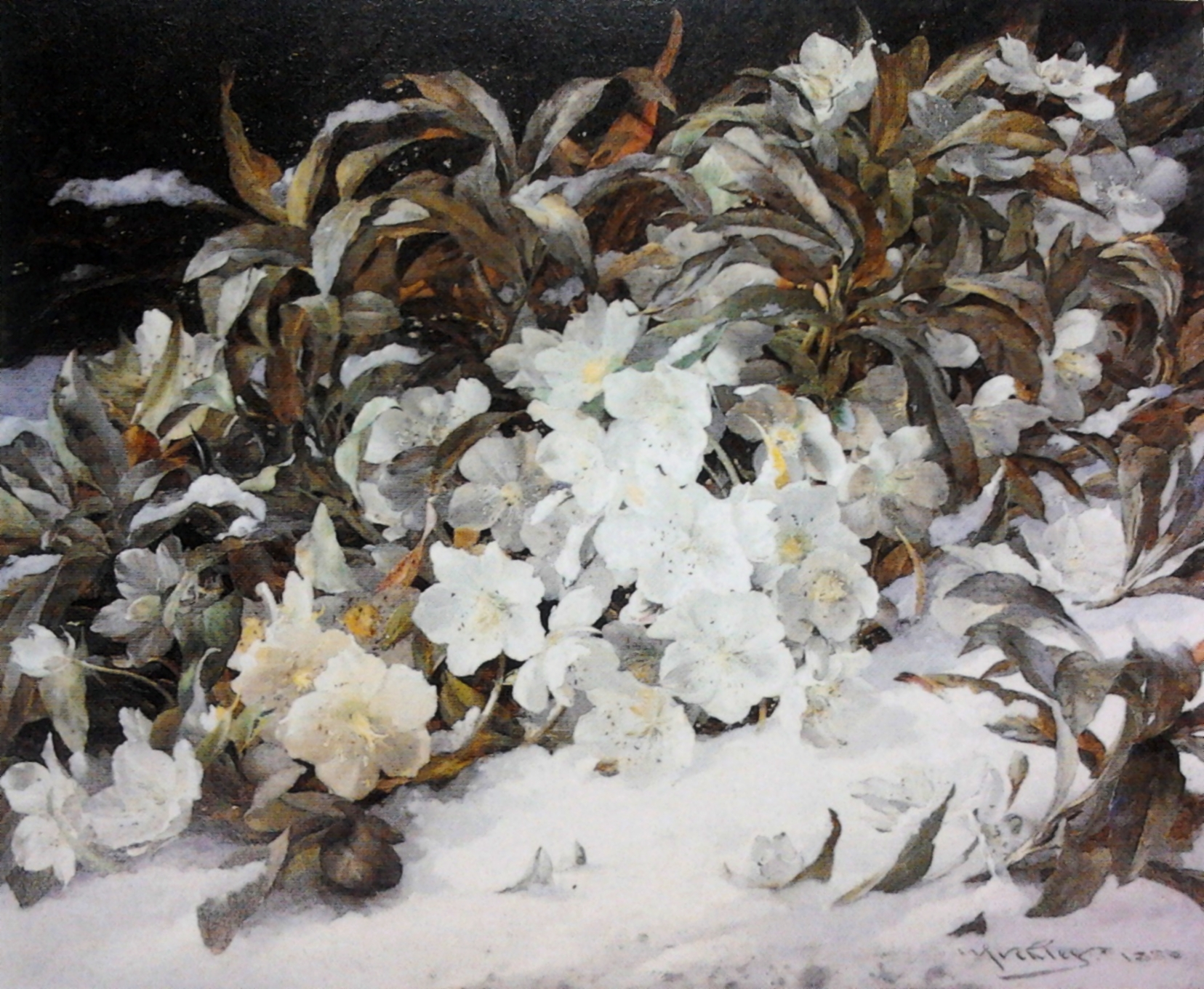
Winter flowers (1856) by William Jabez Muckley, Porczyński Gallery in Warsaw.

William Jabez Muckley (March 23, 1829 – August 30, 1905) was a noted English artist who was born at Wordsley, Kingswinford, in Staffordshire. He was the eldest of the seven children of Jabez Muckley who was a glass artisan.

William Jabez Muckley began his career as a glasscutter with W.H. B. & J. Richardson of Wordsley and became their principal designer and engraver. When only 22, he was responsible for much of the engraving that earned the firm considerable praise in the Great Exhibition of 1851. After the Richardson glass firm was declared insolvent in 1852 Muckley joined the Birmingham School of Art. He won one of the eight scholarships competed for by students at all the art schools in Britain. He went on to study in London and Paris and obtained four art degrees of the highest class.

He was head of the Burslem School of Art for five years in the late 1850s and then went on to be headmaster of Wolverhampton School of Art. In 1862 he became principal of Manchester School of Art. He exhibited at the Royal Academy 1859–1904 and at Suffolk Street, the Royal Institution and Grosvenor Gallery.

In 1878 he wrote The Student's Manual of Artistic Anatomy, with 25 plates of the bones and surface muscles of the human figure, together with a description of the origin, insertion and use of the muscles, and in 1882 wrote A Handbook for Painters and Art Students about the character, nature and use of colours, their permanent or fugitive qualities and the proper vehicles to employ, also short remarks on the practice of painting in oil and water colours, and wrote two other books.

Muckley retired to White Notley Hall, Witham, Essex about 1900 and died at home in 1905.

== Family ==
Muckley's father Jabez was at various times a glasscutter, a glassworks manager and a glass importer. His younger brother Joseph Fairfax Muckley was the engraver of the very fine Muckley Goblet on display in Birmingham Museum and Art Gallery (inv. 1937M744), although some sources attribute this to William Jabez Muckley himself.

William's son Angelo Fairfax Muckley (1859–1920) was also an artist who illustrated many published works.

A nephew, Louis Fairfax Muckley (1862–1926), also illustrated books, most notably the 1897 Dent edition of The Faerie Queene by Edmund Spenser. A couple of Pre-Raphaelite examples of Louis Fairfax Muckley's work (attributed by some to Angelo Fairfax Muckley) are at . "Autumn" was bought in, after an estimate of £20-30,000, at Christie's London in June 2003.
