= Russells Hall Estate =

Residential area of Dudley, West Midlands, England

Coordinates: 52.505°N 2.11°W

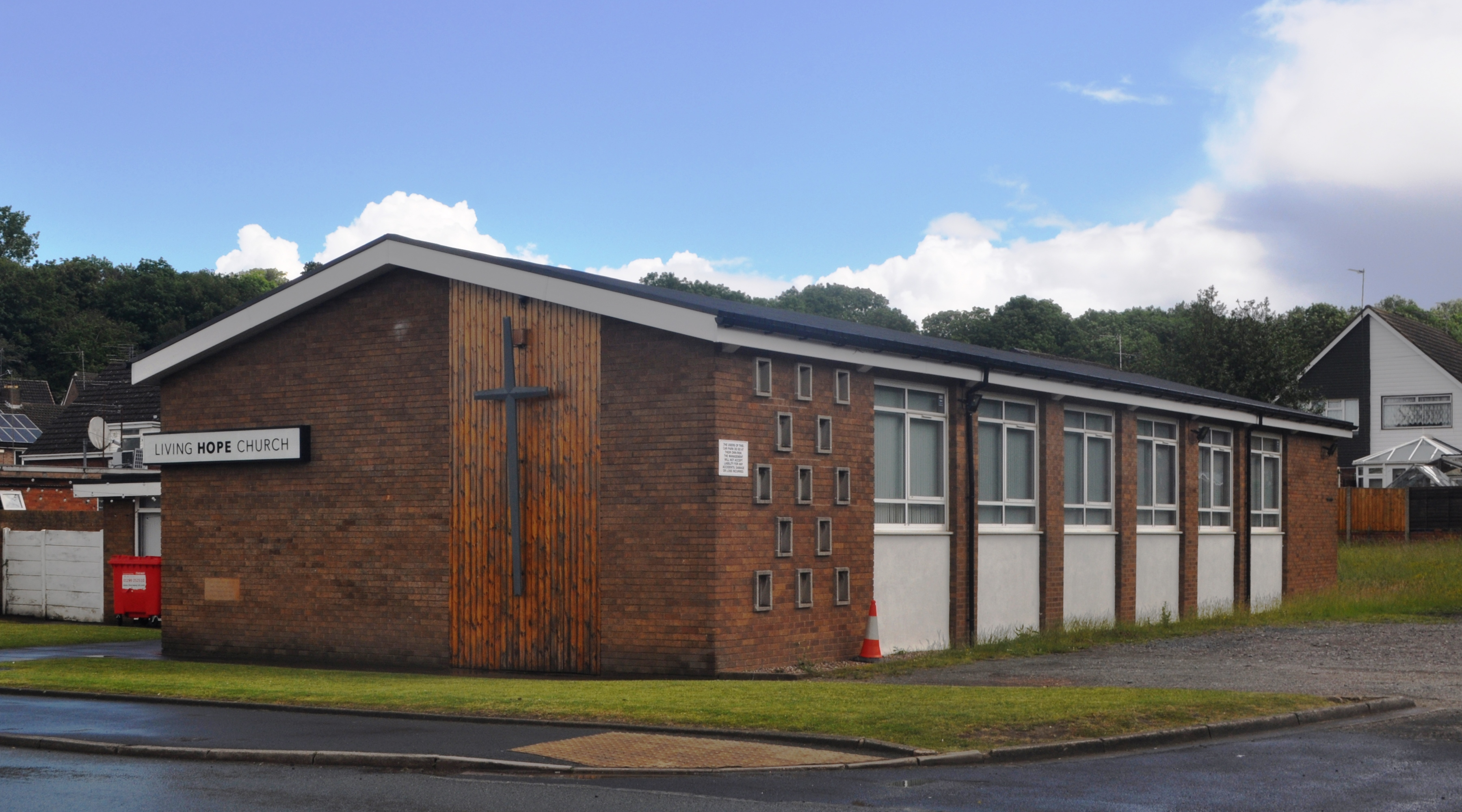
The former St Barnabas Church of England parish church, now Living Hope Church

The Russells Hall Estate is a residential area of Dudley, West Midlands, England, approximately one mile to the west of Dudley town centre. On Ordnance Survey maps the area appears as Russell's Hall.

== History ==
The estate was once the grounds to Russells Hall, a large country house. The hall stood on the land until the early 1800s, where Grange Park is now.

The area was extensively mined for coal during the Industrial Revolution, which meant the district became highly industrialised in the heyday of the Black Country's industrial past. This process ceased in about 1950 when the local council earmarked the area for housing development, to rehouse hundreds of families from the dilapidated 19th-century terraces in the town centre around The Inhedge and Stafford Street. The land at Russells Hall was then made safe and allowed to settle until house building commenced.

The first house was completed and let in 1958, and by 1966 the estate was complete, consisting of several hundred council houses and flats as well as some private houses, mostly around Scott's Green Close on the south side of the estate. Several more private and council properties, including about 30 council bungalows, were added in the 1970s around Middlepark Road.

Until the creation of the traffic island near Russells Hall Hospital, it was possible to see part of the blocked-up portal of a bridge which took a railway line under Kingswinford Road.

== Services and facilities ==
The estate is served by several schools including Russells Hall Primary School on Overfield Road and the Pegasus Academy on Scotts Green Close. Sutton School, a special school, is also on Scotts Green Close.

The area is served by Russells Hall Hospital, a general hospital which stands on Pensnett Road to the south of the estate.

A large area of public open space, known as Russells Hall park, exists around the centre of the estate and in 2005 was earmarked by Dudley council as a possible site for mass housing development. The park has a children's play area, skatepark and a non-turf cricket pitch.

== See also ==
- Gornal
- Wren's Nest Estate
- Kates Hill Estate
- Kingswinford
- Guest Hospital
- Old Swinford Hospital School
