= Tipton Catastrophe =

1922 munitions explosion in Tipton, England

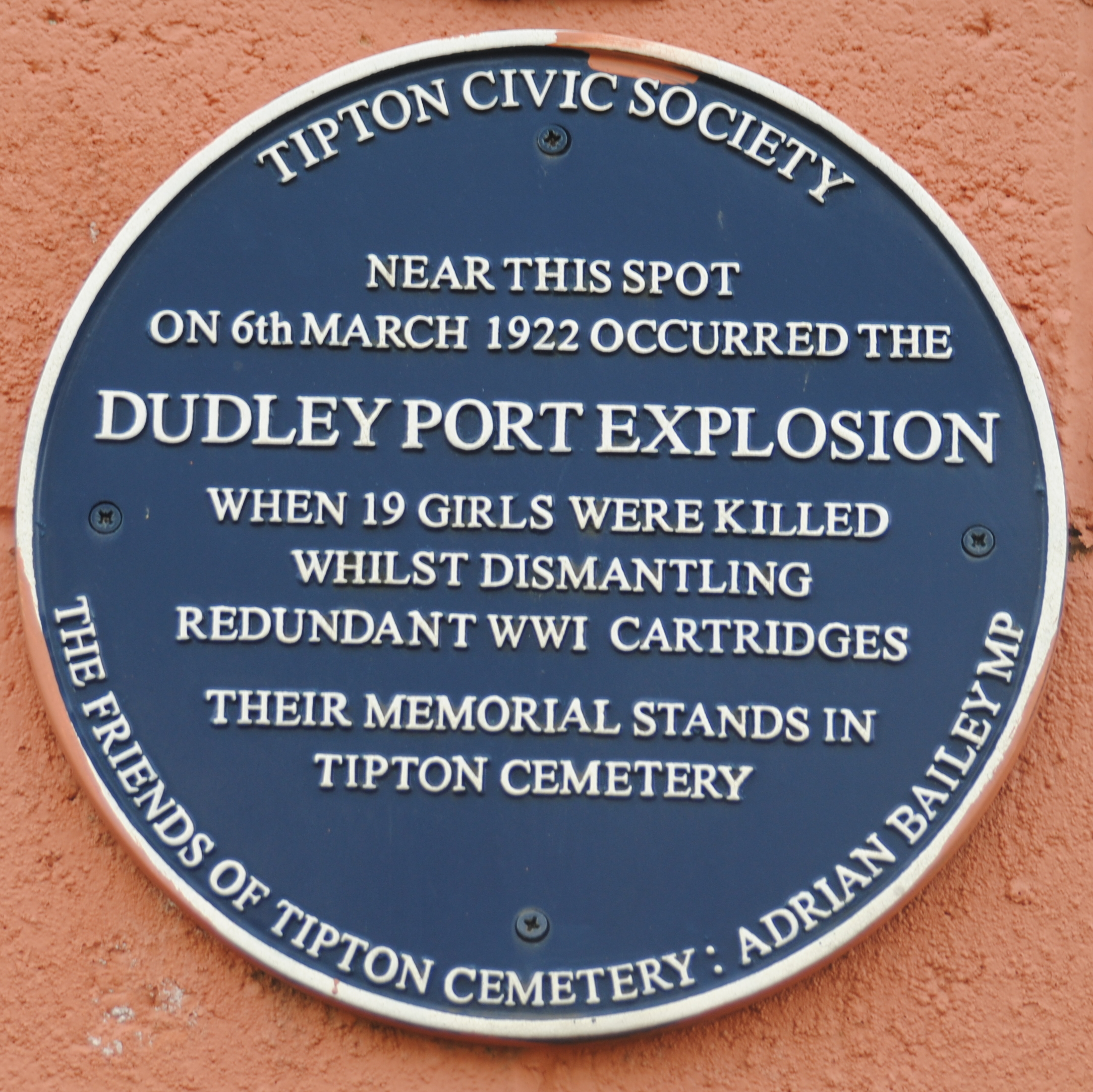
- Tipton Civic Society blue plaque, commemorating the victims
- Date: 6 March 1922
- Location: Groveland Road, Dudley Port, Tipton, England; 52.51998°N 2.05473°W
- Also known as: Dudley Port explosion
- Type: Munitions factory explosion
- Deaths: 19

The Tipton Catastrophe or Dudley Port explosion was a 1922 munitions explosion in the South Staffordshire town of Tipton, (Note: in 1974, Tipton became part of the West Midlands County, as part of the borough of Sandwell) England, in which 19 teenaged girls, working in an unlicensed and unsafe factory, died. The works' head manager was imprisoned for manslaughter. Several memorials commemorate the victims.

== Background ==
After World War I, millions of surplus rifle cartridges remained in British army stock. 45 million rounds of .22 ammunition were purchased by the Premier Aluminium Casting Company Limited of Hay Mills, Birmingham, who were licensed to process them to recover their scrap metal. A condition of the licence was that the factory where the work was undertaken was inspected for the suitability of its premises and safety processes, such as the avoidance of naked flames, and isolating workers from each other in groups of two or three. It was usual for workers in such licensed premises to be required to wear shoes without nails, to avoid sparks, and non-flammable clothing.

Premier Aluminium Casting resold about 160 long tons (160 t) of the ammunition for dismantling at premises owned by Louisa Kate Knowles in Groveland Road, Dudley Port, Tipton.

== Explosion ==
On 6 March 1922, an explosion occurred at the company workshop, situated at the junction of Dudley Port and Groveland Road. The explosion detonated a large quantity of the cartridges. 19 of the 24 workers present, all teenagers, one being 13 years old, one 16, and the rest 14 or 15, were killed, many of them dying in hospital over the following hours and days as a result of horrendous injuries and burning. Thousands of onlookers gathered at the site.

The injured and dying were taken to the Guest Hospital in nearby Dudley, which was stretched to capacity as a result. There were eventually just five survivors of the explosion.

== Aftermath ==
The event was reported in cinema newsreels, and was discussed in Parliament, not least by a local Member of Parliament, Alfred Short, a prominent trades unionist.

The remaining ammunition, said to be worth £2,800 (equivalent to £137,563 in 2025) was seized by the authorities.

A formal investigation was ordered by the Home Secretary, Edward Shortt, under Section 66 of the Explosives Act, 1875. The inquiry was headed by Lieutenant-Colonel Samuel Fleming, a Metropolitan Police magistrate, with the assistance of Major Aston Cooper-Key, the government's Chief Inspector of Explosives. It opened on 22 May 1922 at Victoria Law Courts, Birmingham, and was postponed until 24 July, after criminal proceedings had concluded.

The factory owner's husband and its head manager, John Walter Knowles, aged 55, and the works manager, James Richard Chadwick, were tried for manslaughter at Stafford Assizes before Mr. Justice Shearman. The two-day trial opened on 10 July 1922. Knowles, who was represented by Henry Curtis-Bennett, was sentenced to five years imprisonment, and Chadwick acquitted. It transpired that Knowles had previous convictions for receiving stolen metal, and for contravening the Factory Act. In summing up, Shearman said it had been the worst case of manslaughter he had dealt with. Twenty-three civil cases were also brought against the perpetrators.

Fleming's preliminary report was published on 12 July. The final report was published on 8 November. (Note: The two reports were published as White Papers.)

It was revealed that the factory, as an unauthorised subcontractor of a licensed contractor, was not licensed to carry out such work, and thus had never been inspected for its suitability to do so. The victims had worn their own clothing and shoes, and the workshop, which had a concrete floor, (Note: Concrete is prone to sparking) was heated by an open stove and a fire. No safety precautions had been taken.

== Commemoration ==
A Portland stone memorial to the victims, erected by public subscription in 1924 and refurbished in 2010, stands in section O of Tipton Cemetery. It bears the names of all of the victims, as well as the five survivors.

The site of the explosion is marked with a blue plaque, erected by Tipton Civic Society in 2013.

The centenary of the event was marked with an installation by the Birmingham artist Chris Hardy, at Tipton Community Centre, comprising 19 oversize dresses, which had holes from being shot at.
