= Dudley Group NHS Foundation Trust =

Healthcare trust in England

The Dudley Group NHS Foundation Trust
- Former name: Dudley Group of Hospitals NHS Trust
- Type: NHS foundation trust
- Established: 1 October 2008
- Region served: Dudley; Sandwell
- Hospitals: Russells Hall Hospital; Guest Hospital
- Chair: Sir David Nicholson
- Chief executive: Diane Wake
- Website: dudleygroup.nhs.uk

The Dudley Group NHS Foundation Trust runs Russells Hall Hospital and Guest Hospital in Dudley and Corbett Hospital Outpatient Centre, in Stourbridge, West Midlands, England. It also provides community health services to the borough.

== History ==
The Dudley Group of Hospitals NHS Trust was established in 1994, taking responsibility for services previously provided by Dudley Health Authority. The Trust achieved foundation trust status in October 2008.

The Trust acquired the Adult Services division of Dudley Primary Care Trust in April 2011, gaining approval to change its name to The Dudley Group NHS Foundation Trust.

It agreed in July 2015 to join the Black Country Alliance with Sandwell and West Birmingham Hospitals NHS Trust and Walsall Healthcare NHS Trust. The trusts plan to create a jointly owned Company Limited by Guarantee which will enable them to jointly bid for contracts. There will also be some consolidation of administrative functions like payroll, information technology and estates.

== Performance ==
The trust which employs 4,500 staff in 2014, was planning to reduce its staff by about 400 between 2014 and 2016 in order to deal with its £6.7 million deficit.

It was named by the Health Service Journal as one of the top hundred NHS trusts to work for in 2015. At that time it had 4,177 full-time equivalent staff and a sickness absence rate of 3.8%. 72% of staff recommend it as a place for treatment and 67% recommended it as a place to work.

The trust was given four enforcement notices in 2018 by the Care Quality Commission because of continued concerns regarding patient safety at the "inadequate" A&E department at Russells Hall Hospital.

== Controversy ==
In July 2013 two former governors of the trust, Bill Etheridge and Major Robbins, called for managers at the borough's hospitals to be sacked in the wake of the Keogh Review which criticised staffing levels at Russells Hall Hospital and the trust's complaints process. They claimed they quit in frustration after being repeatedly told they were unable to raise issues relating to operational matters.

In January 2014 allegations by John Marchant, the former head of security, were reported that staff had routinely forced vulnerable patients to stay in their rooms – or even confined them to their beds – despite them posing no danger to anyone. The Care Quality Commission was to investigate. In March 2014 it was reported that David Ore, who managed security staff across the three hospitals, after repeatedly raising concerns had been suspended in November 2012 and sacked five months later after a disciplinary hearing. He claimed children and pensioners were being restrained and locked in hospital cubicles for up to 12 hours without food or drink. He won an appeal but was again ordered out on 'special leave' in January – two days after an article about Russells Hall Hospital restraining patients appeared in the media and was given notice of redundancy.

Facilities in the trust's private finance initiative development are run by Interserve. In May 2015 it was reported that there were tensions between the company and the trust and that the company, which ran the hospital restaurant, was considering banning hospital staff who do not buy food from eating there. In November 2014 the trust had asked the company to launch new menus and invest £500,000 in heated trolleys because patients had complained about the temperature of their food. The company demanded access to the trust's wifi service to process meal orders and refused to implement new menus without it. The trust wanted to charge the company for access, and the trust board was told the company's response was not positive.

== See also ==
- List of NHS trusts
- Healthcare in West Midlands
