= The Wordsley School =

Location
- Brierley Hill Road; Wordsley, West Midlands, DY8 5SP; England; 52°28′50″N 2°08′59″W

Information
- Type: Community school
- Motto: High Expectations + Challenge = Success
- Established: 1972
- Local authority: Dudley
- Department for Education URN: 103858 Tables
- Ofsted: Reports
- Headteacher: Ashley Weatherhogg
- Gender: Coeducational
- Age: 11 to 16
- Enrolment: 948
- Houses: Stuart (Blue), Doulton (Gold/Yellow), Webb (Silver), Tudor (Red)
- Colours: Claret and Blue
- Twitter: @wordsleyschool
- Website: http://www.wordsleyschool.co.uk/

The Wordsley School is a coeducational community secondary school, located in Wordsley (near Stourbridge) in the West Midlands of England.

== History ==
It opened in September 1972 as Buckpool School to serve the community of Wordsley, replacing Audnam Secondary School. It was renamed The Wordsley School in September 2002, and has gained specialisms in business & enterprise and music.

In 2008, a front-page article in the Stourbridge News newspaper was run, with headteacher Mike Lambert criticising Secretary of State for Children, Schools and Families Ed Balls after Mr. Balls threatened the school with closure because it was not achieving the target of 30% A* to C GCSEs in Maths and English.

However, the school comfortably exceeded this target in 2009 when 37% of the school's GCSE students gained 5 or more grades at this level, though it was still the fourth lowest ranking school in the borough.

For every year after this initial percentage rise the percentage achieving 5+ A*-C GCSEs (or equivalent) including English and maths GCSEs has increased. In 2010 this was at 46%, in 2011 this was at 50% and then in 2012 this number was 53%.

== Incidents ==
In February 2025, Nicholas Saxon, a former science teacher at the school, was arrested by West Midlands Police following an operation involving undercover officers. In March 2025, he was convicted at Wolverhampton Crown Court of attempting to engage in sexual communication with a child and attempting to incite a female child under 13 to engage in sexual activity. He was sentenced to a two-year community order, placed on the sex offenders register for five years, and made subject to a sexual harm prevention order. In March 2026, a Teaching Regulation Agency (TRA) panel issued a prohibition order indefinitely banning him from the teaching profession in England.

== Notable former pupils ==
- Carl Bridgewater, murder victim who was a third year (equivalent of today's Year 9) pupil at Buckpool School when he died on 19 September 1978
- S. J. Watson, writer whose most notable work is Before I Go to Sleep which has been made into a film starring Nicole Kidman.
