= Edward Webb and Sons =

British seed merchants

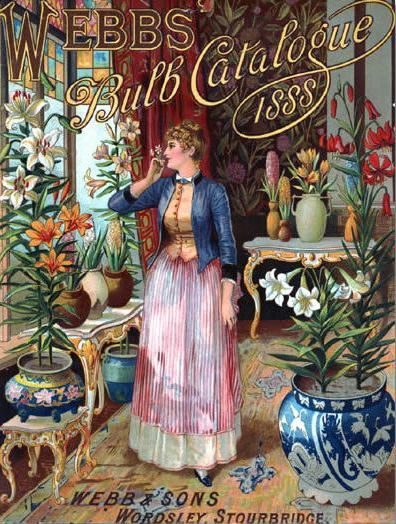
Bulb catalogue cover (1888)

Edward Webb and Sons, a.k.a. Webbs, were English seed merchants or seedsmen, dating back to c. 1850 when Edward Webb started a business in Wordsley, near Stourbridge. By the 1890s, Webb and Sons had been appointed seedsmen to Queen Victoria, and had become a household name around the UK.

Fertilisers being crucial to the nursery industry, the Webbs in 1894 took over Proctor and Ryland, a well-known bone manure works in Saltney near Chester, and considerably expanded its activities, becoming Saltney's second largest business.

Edward Webb and Sons were awarded a gold medal at the Royal Horticultural Society's Chelsea Flower Show in 1914.

During World War II the firm was the primary supplier of grass seeds and fertiliser for airfields, both under the Air Ministry and local municipalities. The seeds used for this purpose were chosen to withstand heavy aircraft traffic. Webb and Sons also assisted in the camouflage of landing strips.

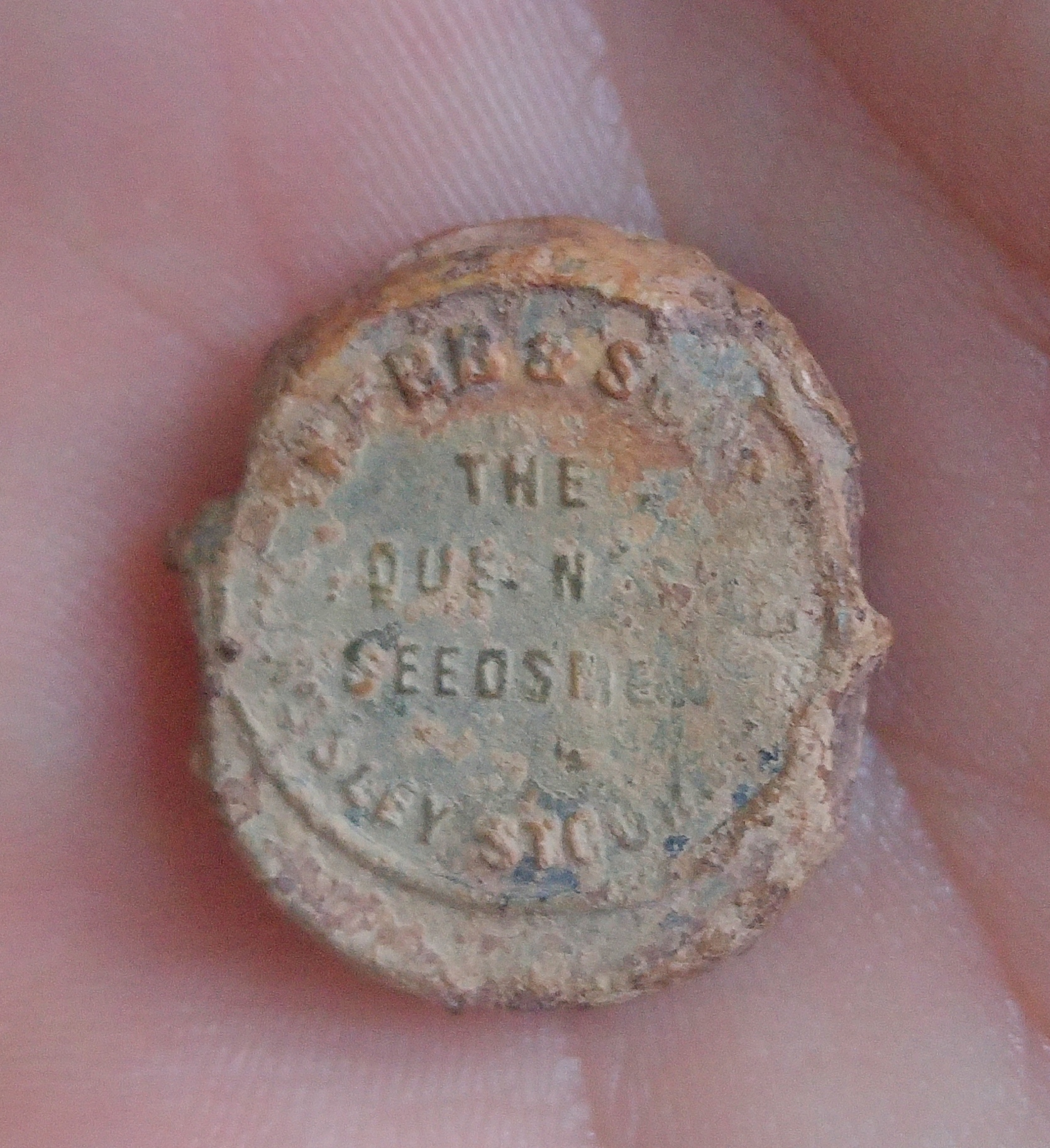
Lead Seed sack seal found metal detecting Sunday 21 August 2016 by M.Lewis - Stourport
