= Burton Road Hospital =

- Shown in West Midlands

Geography
- Location: Dudley, England, United Kingdom
- Coordinates: 52.518°N 2.105°W

Organisation
- Care system: Public NHS

Services
- Emergency department: No Accident & Emergency

History
- Founded: late 19th century
- Closed: 1993

Links
- Lists: Hospitals in England

Burton Road Hospital was a NHS hospital situated in Dudley, West Midlands, England. (Note: Unlike most of the old Sedgley urban district, however, the land on which Burton Road Hospital stood became part of the Dudley DY1 post code district rather than Sedgley DY3.)

== History ==
The hospital has its origins in the infirmary for the Dudley Union Workhouse which was built to the west of the main workhouse site in the 19th century. The workhouse was converted into a hospital and, in the late 1920s, it became known as the Dudley Institution. Additions to the institution at that time included a maternity hospital which was completed in 1926 and which was re-named the Rosemary Ednam Maternity Hospital in memory of Lady Ednam who had died in an air crash in July 1930.

A donation by the Rotary Club enabled Burton Road Hospital to receive the country's first mobile cardiac unit in 1971. The maternity unit continued to provide maternity services to the local area until they were transferred to a new 118-bed maternity unit at the Wordsley Hospital in the late 1980s. Following the transfer of the remaining services to Russells Hall Hospital and Bushey Fields Hospital, the hospital closed in December 1993 and the site has since been redeveloped for housing.
