= The Lace Guild =

UK lacemaking charity

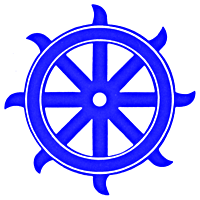
- The Logo of the Lace Guild based on the Wheel of St Catherine of Alexandria, Patron Saint of Weavers, Spinners and Lacemakers
- Formation: 1976
- Type: Craft Organization
- Purpose: To encourage the craft of lacemaking
- Headquarters: The Hollies
- Location: 53 Audnam, Stourbridge, England
- Coordinates: 52.473059°N 2.155861°W
- Website: www.laceguild.org

The Lace Guild is a registered charity, accredited museum and educational organisation based in the UK for lacemakers and those interested in lacemaking. Its aims are to provide information about the craft of lacemaking, its history and use, to promote a high standard of lacemaking, and to encourage the design, development and professional presentation of lace. It is a registered educational charity.

== History ==
The Lace Guild was founded in 1976, following a resurgence in interest in a craft that had existed in Britain since the sixteenth century. The first chairman was Doreen Wright (1907–2003). In 1985 The Lace Guild acquired permanent headquarters, ‘The Hollies’, administered by paid staff at Stourbridge in the West Midlands.

The organization celebrated its 25th anniversary in 2001 with the publication of a book containing a short description of its history. In 2009 The Lace Guild Museum achieved Accredited status.

== Membership and organization ==
Although The Lace Guild is based in Britain, there are no national restrictions on membership. Members elect an executive committee, who are Trustees of the charity, and serve for a three-year period. The committee reports to members each year at an AGM which is held during the annual convention.

== Activities ==
The Lace Guild publishes a quarterly magazine, Lace, which members receive as part of their membership. The Lace Guild publishes books, especially instruction books on various laces, the development of which it also fosters through an assessment scheme. It has a large library, from which British members may borrow in person or by post, and its website includes pages with information on the history of lacemaking. It organizes courses, a summer school, an annual convention, and a triennial open competition.

== Museum ==
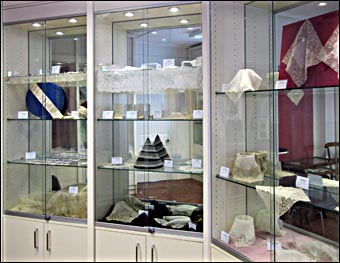
View of the exhibition room at The Lace Guild headquarters

The Lace Guild headquarters, ‘The Hollies’, houses the organization's extensive museum collection of lace and related artefacts. Themed exhibitions of selections of lace from the collection or elsewhere are shown in the display room. These exhibitions change quarterly and are open to the public (not just Lace Guild members) on Fridays. On other days of the week and for large groups it is necessary to make an appointment before visiting. Viewing of specific items in the collection can also be arranged.

The Lace Guild has an email service, ‘Artefact of the Month’, through which one may receive a monthly image from the museum collection.
