= Periscope (art gallery) =

Periscope was an art gallery and event space located in the Lee Bank area of Birmingham, England.

The gallery was opened in 2004 by the Birmingham Artists collective (which also ran the former B16 Gallery near Brindleyplace) and forms part of their studio complex on Holloway Head. It hosted a programme of exhibitions and events by Birmingham Artists members and by visiting artists and curators, with work ranging from experimental installation art to traditional painting. Over 200 artists exhibited.

In June 2007 a regular £50,000 grant was withdrawn at short notice by Birmingham City Council and the gallery faced closure in December 2007 after it had fulfilled its remaining commitments.
