= Stourbridge Glass Museum =

Glass manufacturing museum in Stourbridge, West Midlands, UK

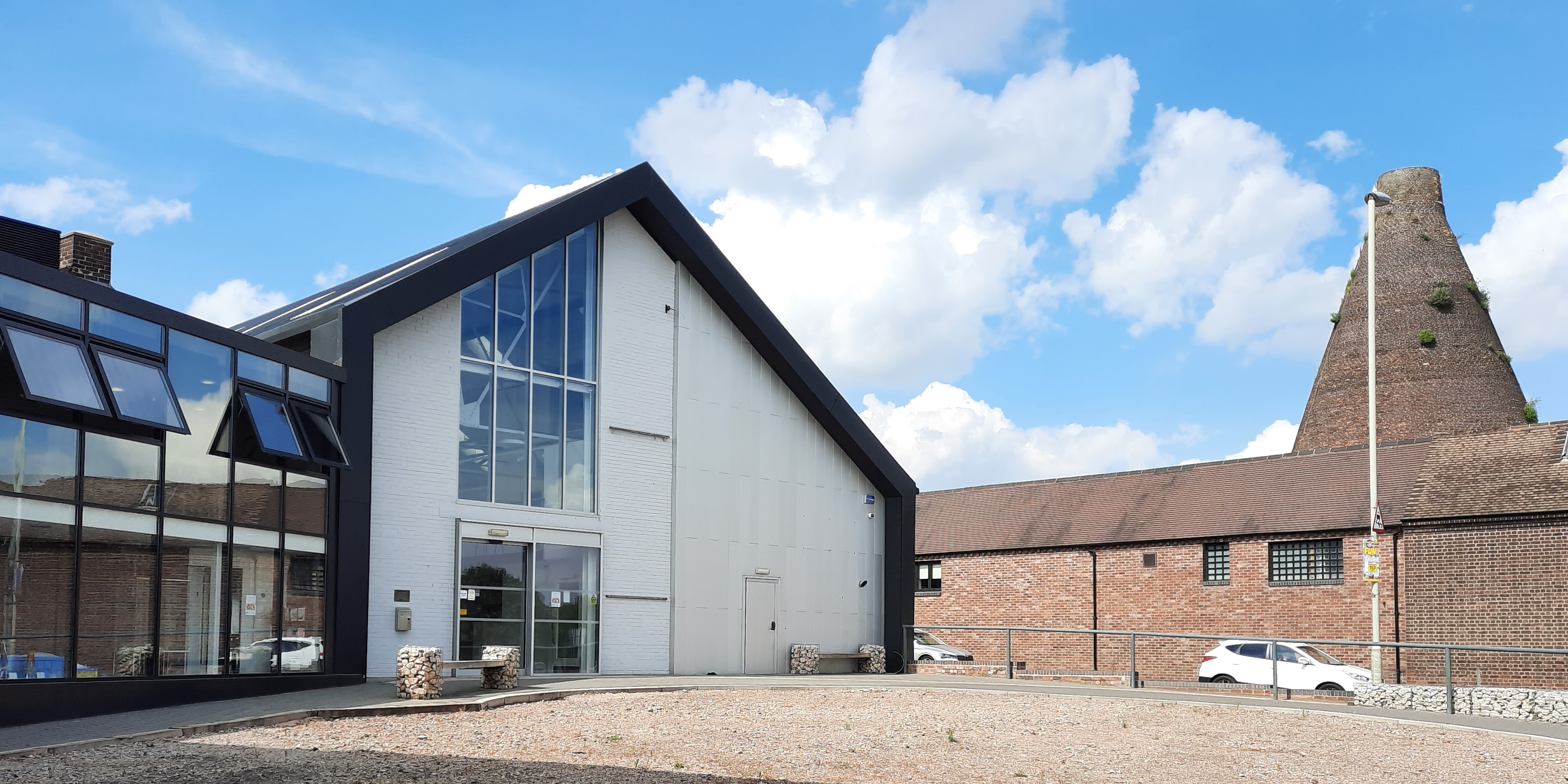
- Museum entrance in 2021, with Red House Cone on right
- Established: 9 April 2022; 4 years ago
- Location: Wordsley, Stourbridge, West Midlands, England
- Coordinates: 52.4760°N 2.1578°W
- Type: Art, craft and social history museum
- Accreditation: Arts Council England
- Manager: Alexander Goodger
- Curator: Harrison Davies
- Architect: Bryant Priest Newman
- Parking: On site (no charge)
- Website: stourbridgeglassmuseum.org.uk

Stourbridge Glass Museum in Wordsley, West Midlands, displays a selection of over 10,000 objects from 400 years of glass-making in the area. It has a hot glass studio and examples of cameo glass produced historically and by modern techniques.

== Establishment ==
In 2010, the British Glass Foundation was formed and campaigned for the creation of a new glass museum in the Stourbridge area. A site was selected in Camp Hill, Wordsley, previously the White House Glassworks which had been acquired by Stuart Crystal in 1914. The museum opened to the public in April 2022, although the official opening by The Duke of Gloucester was delayed until 19 April 2023. The Duke signed a plaque made by resident glassmaker, Allister Malcolm, and engraved by cameo glass maker Terri-Louise Colledge.

== Building ==
The Stuart Crystal factory was housed in a grade II listed building but this had closed in 2001 and been vandalised. The design by the architects, Bryant Priest Newman, uses the previous Newhouse Building for the museum, over two floors, and the Mill Buildings have been converted into commercial units and apartments. The rebuild was funded by the European Regional Development Fund, with the National Heritage Lottery Fund financing the interior. The location of the original White House glass cone, a brick structure, is now marked by a glass pyramid in the forecourt of the museum.

=== Tunnels ===
Under the buildings of the museum are tunnels which are estimated to be 250 years old. These had several functions, as they were accessible from the canal for coal to be offloaded to fuel the glass furnace and to take away the finished product. Once fully restored, they will be opened to the public.

=== Glass furnace ===
The museum has a working hot glass studio equipped with an electric glassmaking furnace which is powered by solar panels, making the building largely self-sufficient in energy. Demonstrations of glass blowing are open to the public: they are often led by renowned glass maker Alister Malcolm.

== Collection ==
The Stourbridge area has been a centre of glass-making in England for about 400 years, based on its ample supply of coal. The museum displays pieces from the Stourbridge Collection of over 10,000 glass objects, which is owned by Dudley Metropolitan Borough Council and has been leased to the museum. It was previously housed in the Broadfield House Glass Museum, which closed in 2015. The upper floor of the museum displays contemporary pieces, for example After the Darkness, the Light by Chris Day, which is a boat sculpture intended to illustrate immigration into the UK. It won a Contemporary Glass Society prize in 2022.

=== 2012 Portland Vase project ===
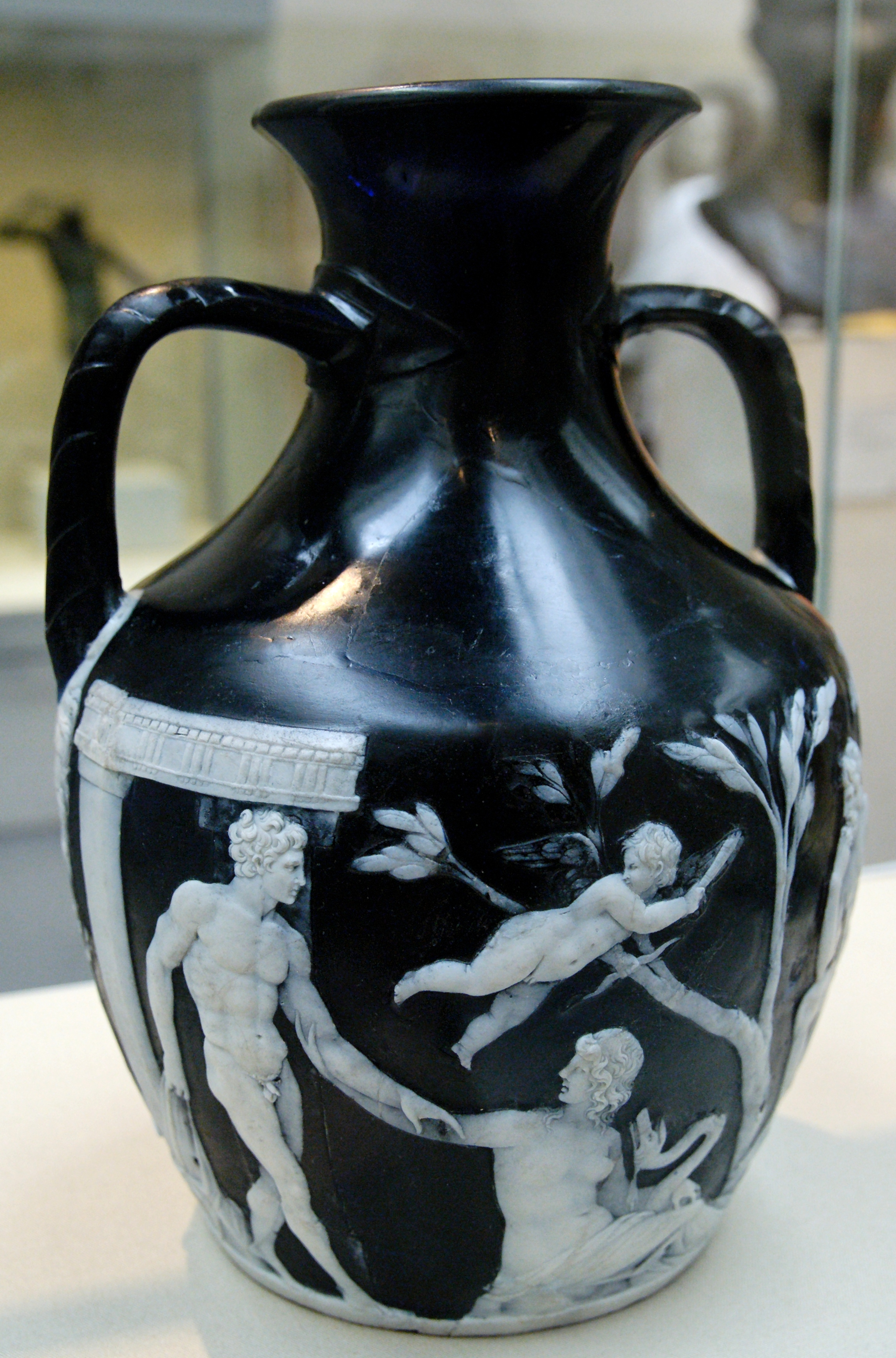
Portland Vase

The Portland Vase is a Roman piece of cameo glass now held by the British Museum. Glass makers in the Stourbridge area have crafted several replicas, including one 19th-century version by Philip Pargeter engraved by John Northwood. This copy is in the Corning Museum of Glass. In 2012, Richard Golding blew glass blanks to which Terri-Louise Colledge added the cameo work. There are now four flat-bottomed vases, one amphora and an Auldjo jug, all of which are on display in the museum.

=== Churchill Memorial Screen ===
The Churchill Memorial Screen is a work in glass by Edward Bainbridge Copnall which was created for the 1969 opening of the Churchill Precinct Shopping Centre in Dudley. It was removed in 1992 due to deterioration and vandalism. One 1.5 by 1.5 metres (59 in × 59 in) panel showing the Battle of Britain has been restored and has been on display since 30 April 2026.
