= Shopcade =

Online marketplace

- Website type: Social commerce
- Available in: English / French
- Creators: Nathalie Gaveau; Marie-Barbe Girard; Hoon Kim; Evan Adelman
- Website: shopcade.com
- Registration: Required for full functionality
- Launched: November 2011 - December 2018
- Current status: Abandoned

Shopcade was a social marketplace with a dual online platform (web and mobile-based app) offering a daily product shopping feed of top trends, products and deals, curated by influencers. The company used the social graph and artificial intelligence to make content shoppable. It also powered an analytics platform, analysing content to commerce engagement and sales.

Coined “the Pinterest of E-commerce” by Business Insider in 2012, Shopcade is the combination of social media and e-commerce as users can make wishlists of fashion & lifestyle products (clothing, beauty, decoration, books...), shop their favorite items and share content. They get personalised offers based on their shopping profile and social graph. The app was initially available in the United Kingdom, the United States and France with audiences ranging from 16 to 45 years old.

== History ==
The fashion e-commerce startup was created in London in November 2011 by CEO Nathalie Gaveau (co-founder of PriceMinister), Marie-Barbe Girard (COO), Evan Adelman (CTO) and Hoon Kim.

The Shopcade platform allowed users to stay updated with trends, celebrity looks and deals all in one place, powered by magazines, celebrities, bloggers, and its users. Shopcade also offered a click-through purchasing functionality and its own e-commerce platform. “I thought, “Okay, how do I bring Amazon and Facebook together?”” said Nathalie Gaveau, CEO, to Business of Fashion in 2014. “But the main difference is, we are fully powering this content with e-commerce.”

According to Business of Fashion in 2014, “the app attracts more than 100,000 monthly active users and generates revenue through a mix of direct sales, promoted content and affiliate commissions.”

Shopcade was named the “Coolest App in Europe” in 2014.

In 2012, the app was launched in the US then in France in 2016.

In February 2017, Lagardère Active, the media's activities arms of the French group Lagardère, announced it has acquired the company, in order to develop marketplaces for its premium brands including fashion & lifestyle magazines ELLE and Public.

The “ELLE Store” was launched on the French ELLE Website in September 2017. At some point, Lagardere sold its media activities and ceased Shopcade.

== Operations ==
=== Features ===
==== Trending ====
Shopcade publish content where users can get inspired, as they will find articles featuring new trends and products. Different topics are addressed:

- Instacrush featuring a product recently spotted on Instagram
- I like Ya Style related to an inspiring influencer or celebrity
- Deals & Steals featuring products with deals on them
- Top trends, featuring current trends, usually from the fashion weeks and events
- Hot Topics, related to the fashion industry news/announcements

==== Community Feed ====
Users can organize their products into different categories with the “lists” feature and create as many lists as they wish: from bags to lipsticks or home inspiration and books, there is no limit to one's imagination and own universe! They may follow other users or certain lists to that particularly inspire them. A list can be modified or deleted at any time.

As for any social media, users can also share their favorite looks (from their phone library/camera or Instagram) and like & comment on other users’ content. The feed shows in real-time the activity of the Shopcade community.

Content published by the Shopcade editors features instantly shoppable products displayed right after each article. Users also receive real-time notifications when there is a new deal on a product they wish-listed.

==== More ====
Other rubrics like “Top Brands”, “Top Deals”, “Top Interests”, etc. feature the trending topics and influencers. Bloggers and publishers have access to a Shopcade widget that displays their product selections on their own websites.

=== Users ===
As of October 2017, Shopcade has mobile apps for iOS and Android operating systems, along with its website. Users can create an account via Facebook, Twitter, Instagram, Google Plus and e-mail.
