= Russells Hall Hospital =

- The Dudley Group NHS Foundation Trust
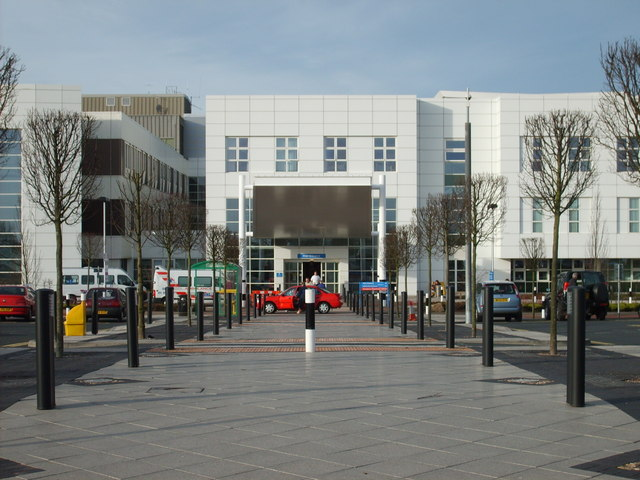
- The main entrance of Russells Hall Hospital

- Shown in West Midlands

Geography
- Location: Dudley, West Midlands, England, United Kingdom
- Coordinates: 52.5024°N 2.1191°W

Organisation
- Care system: Public NHS

Services
- Emergency department: Yes Accident & Emergency

History
- Founded: 1983

Links
- Website: www.dgoh.nhs.uk
- Lists: Hospitals in England

Russells Hall Hospital is an NHS general hospital located in Dudley, West Midlands, England, managed by the Dudley Group NHS Foundation Trust. The hospital is south-west of the town centre on the A4101 road, which connects to the Kingswinford area of the borough.

== History ==
The facility was first planned in the 1960s as a general hospital for Dudley and the surrounding area. The first phase of the hospital opened in the Russells Hall area of Dudley in 1976 as a laundry centre for the borough's hospitals, and the general hospital buildings were built within the next five years, but a shortage of equipment meant that it did not open to patients until March 1984, becoming fully operational in May that year.

The new hospital included an accident and emergency unit to replace those at the Guest Hospital and the Corbett Hospital in Stourbridge. Around this time, the NHS first began to consider the closure of Guest Hospital. In 1992, plans were unveiled for Russells Hall to be expanded as part of plans to close Wordsley and Guest hospitals, as well as parts of the Corbett Hospital. There was much protest against this, and over the next few years there were several amendments to the proposals - including a move which would have seen Wordsley Hospital keep its maternity services but for all other services to relocate to Russells Hall.

In April 1998, however, it was decided that Wordsley Hospital would close completely and Corbett and Guest would be downsized to out-patient services only, with Russells Hall being expanded to include all of the borough's in-patient services. The rationalisation was procured under a Private Finance Initiative contract in 2001. The new facilities, which were designed by the Percy Thomas Partnership and built by Sir Robert McAlpine, were completed in 2005 and the Princess Royal opened the revamped hospital on 22 February 2006 – 22 years after she had opened the original hospital.

In preparation for the completion of the expanded hospital and inevitable rise in traffic, the main road towards Dudley town centre - Kingswinford Road - was widened into a dual carriageway in 2003. The car park was also expanded around the same time - a move which saw several houses along High Street demolished in 1999.

Cricketer Ian Botham, famous for his charity work, opened a state of the art leukemia unit at the hospital in 1998.

Pop star and actor Martin Kemp opened the hospital's new CT scanning suite in January 2006, a decade after he recovered from brain cancer with the help of pioneering treatment.

== Services ==
The hospital now has its own bus station, which gives a direct bus link to Dudley's centre, Brierley Hill, Kingswinford, Birmingham and Stourbridge. Russells Hall Hospital is currently home to Dudley Hospital Radio which is a free service available to the beds in the hospital. The radio station, which is run as a charity, originally started at the Guest Hospital in 1975 before moving to Russells Hall in 1999.

== Performance ==
The trust was given four enforcement notices in 2018 by the Care Quality Commission because of continued concerns regarding patient safety at the "inadequate" A&E department at Russells Hall.

== 2018 Inquiry ==
It was announced in September 2018 that the A&E department was being investigated after concerns had been raised about the deaths of 54 patients in a 6-month period.

== See also ==
- List of hospitals in England
