= Corbett Hospital =

- Dudley Group NHS Foundation Trust
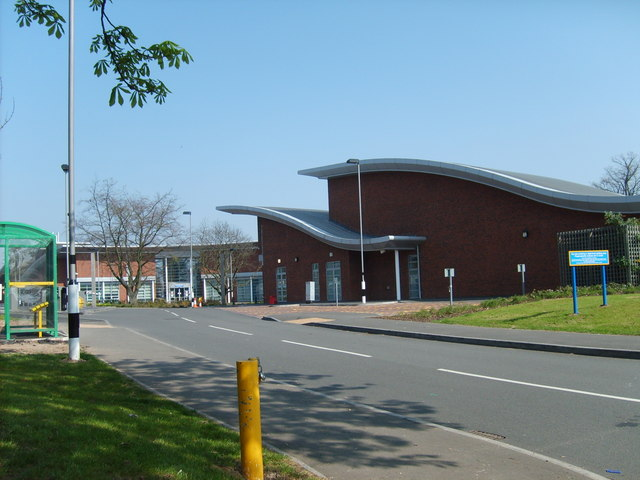
- The Corbett Hospital Outpatient Centre

- Location in West Midlands

Geography
- Location: Amblecote, West Midlands, United Kingdom
- Coordinates: 52.4653°N 2.1468°W

Organisation
- Care system: Public NHS

History
- Founded: 1893

Links
- Website: dudleygroup.nhs.uk
- Lists: Hospitals in the United Kingdom

Corbett Hospital is a National Health Service (NHS) hospital run by the Dudley Group NHS Foundation Trust located in Amblecote, Stourbridge, West Midlands, England. The hospital is an out-patient centre which opened on 25 May 2007 in a ceremony conducted by Tony Blair as part of his farewell tour before resigning as prime minister.

== History ==
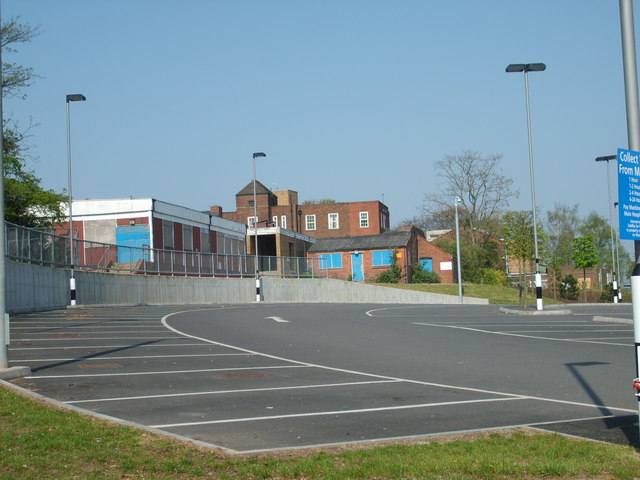
The old Corbett Hospital in 2007 before it was demolished

=== The Old Hospital ===
The old hospital had its origins in a seven-bedroom mansion known as The Hill, the home of George Mills, a glass manufacturer who was a partner in the Albert Glass House situated in Wordsley. He committed suicide on 13 November 1885 after several years of mental illness. He left debts of £11,344-12s-6d. Although the house was in poor repair, it was eventually sold to pay off the liabilities.

John Corbett, who spent his youth living at the Delph, made his fortune producing salt at Stoke Prior, Worcestershire. He purchased the house in December 1891. He repaired and refurbished it, changing it into a hospital, and endowed it to the local people on 31 July 1893, with a sum of £2,000 for endowment.

The Corbett Hospital Preliminary Training School was opened in 1948 on the formation of the National Health Service, providing accommodation for 12 medical students.

=== Accident and emergency unit ===
An accident and emergency unit was opened in 1964 but closed 20 years later after a new unit was opened at Russells Hall Hospital.

In the late 1990s, there was widespread local campaigning for the return of accident and emergency facilities at the Corbett, on the grounds that such facilities would reduce the waiting time for people around Stourbridge who needed the service.

The original Corbett Hospital closed in 2005 after 112 years in use. The new building is situated within the grounds of the original one, which was demolished in late 2007.
