= Guest Hospital =

- The Dudley Group NHS Foundation Trust
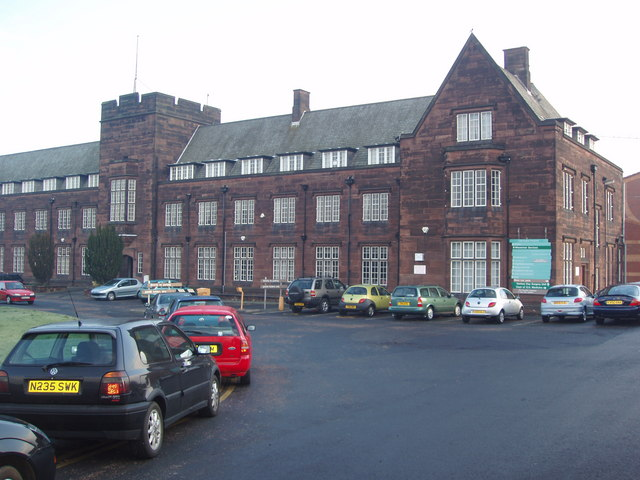

- Shown in West Midlands

Geography
- Location: Dudley, West Midlands, England
- Coordinates: 52.5202°N 2.0727°W

Organisation
- Care system: NHS

History
- Founded: 1871

Links
- Website: http://www.dgoh.nhs.uk/

The Guest Hospital is a hospital in Dudley, West Midlands, England, part of the Dudley Group NHS Foundation Trust

== History ==
=== Victorian origins ===
Situated in Tipton Road, Dudley the buildings were originally constructed as almshouses in 1849 by the William Ward, 1st Earl of Dudley to accommodate workers who had become blind in the limestone pits. They were taken over by Joseph Guest, an English chainmaker who developed his industry in the Black Country of Central England during the Industrial Revolution of the 19th century. Guest provided the finance to convert the almshouses for hospital use. The new hospital was officially opened by Georgina Ward, Countess of Dudley on 25 October 1871.

=== 20th century hospital ===
In 1908, Tipton pawnbroker Hugh Lewis left a significant sum to the hospital.

In March 1922, the hospital treated several victims of the Tipton Catastrophe, a factory explosion in which 24 teenage girls who were dismantling surplus World War I ammunition suffered extensive burns, 19 dying.

Most of the hospital was rebuilt between 1929 and 1939, on the far side not visible from Tipton Road, though part of these new buildings were visible from Birmingham New Road which opened in 1927 and allowed for a second vehicular access point (which was closed in the 1990s). A new pre-fabricated timber/plaster board annex was added in the 1960s, and survived until the hospital's closure.

The hospital's accident and emergency department closed in the spring of 1984 and was relocated to the new Russells Hall Hospital. Around this time, there were concerns in the local area that Guest Hospital was on the verge of closure, but the opening of a new hydrotherapy pool and physiotherapy department in 1986 appeared to ease those concerns. However, National Health Service officials announced in July 1990 that they were considering closing the hospital (along with nearby Burton Road Hospital, which ultimately closed in December 1993) and expanding Russells Hall to accommodate replacement facilities, but the hospital survived another 17 years. The former nurse's home at the hospital was demolished in 1996.

=== New buildings ===
A new horseshoe-shaped extension was opened in 2003, but the old buildings - including the out-patients department - remained in use until October 2007. Today the horseshoe-shaped building is used as an outpatient centre for Dudley Group NHS Foundation Trust. Most of the buildings are due to be retained owing to their historic importance, though some of the less significant structures were demolished to make way for a housing development - these included the wards at the rear of the site which were built in the 1930s, as well as the hydrotherapy pool and physiotherapy department. The administration building, former out-patients unit and hospital lodge were retained to form residential properties.

In 2008, it was used to film Ghosthunting with... and stars from I'm a Celebrity... Get Me Out of Here! ghosthunted in parts of the hospital, just six months after it closed. The hospital continues to operate as an out-patient centre.

=== Redevelopment ===
A major programme of renovation work to convert the main hospital building into 29 apartments began in November 2015. The new owners of the apartments were able to take possession of their properties in "Bourne Hall" in December 2018.

== Gallery ==
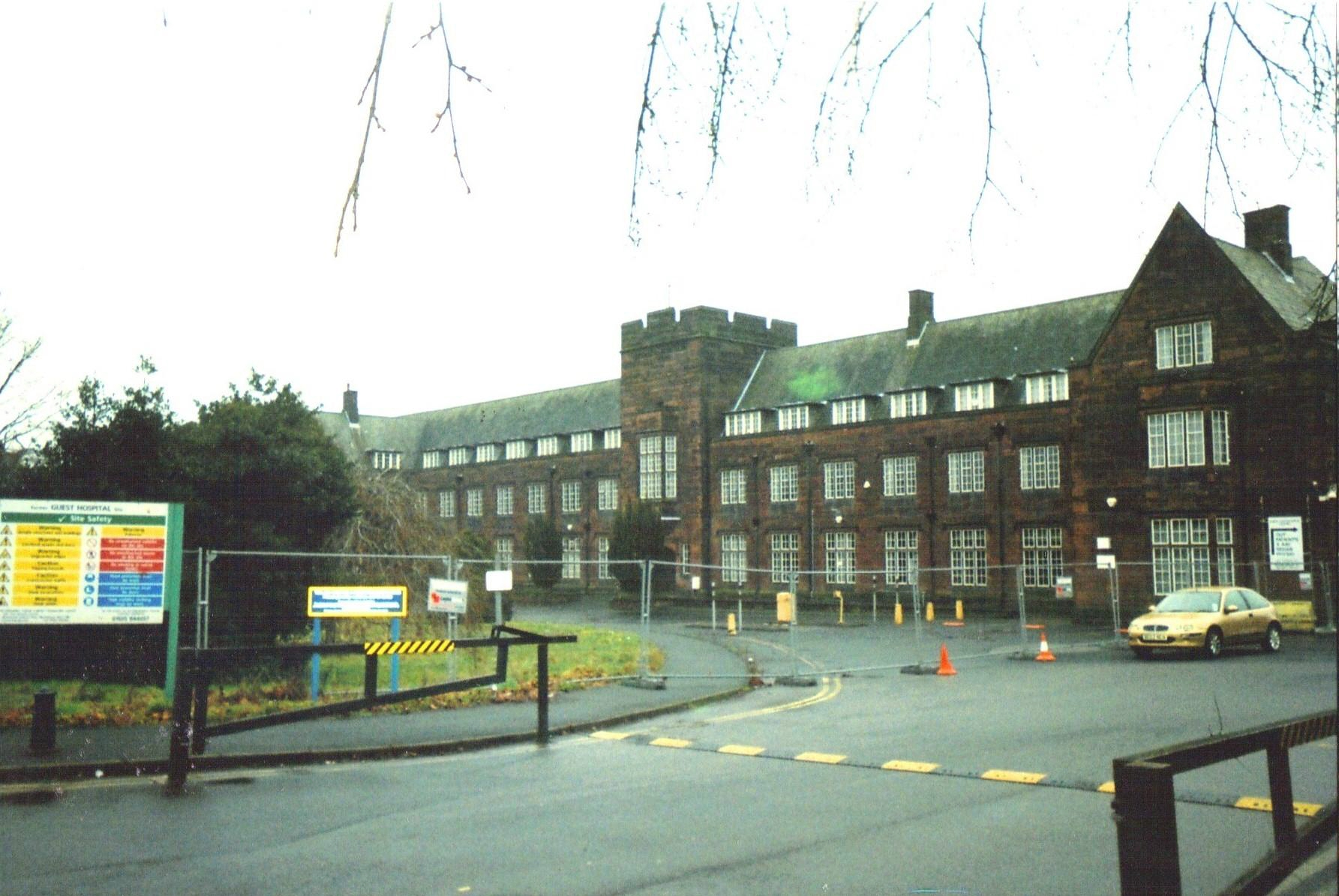
The Joseph Guest Hospital's Victorian wing.

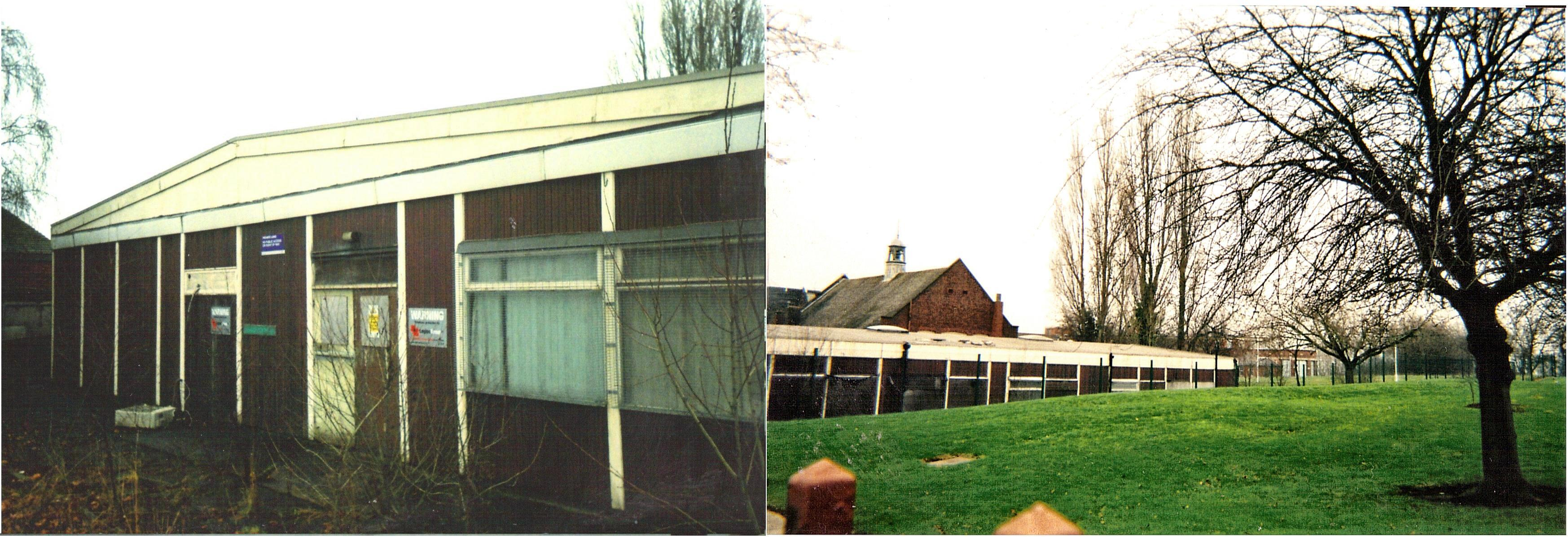
The Joseph Guest Hospital's 1960's Annex.
