= Broadfield House Glass Museum =

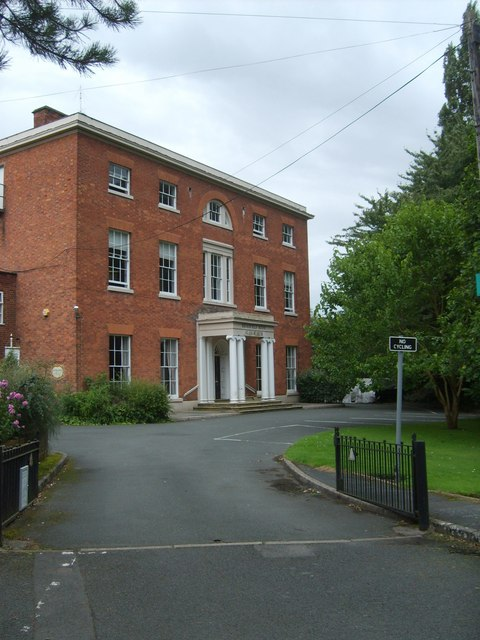
- The historical frontage
- Established: 1980
- Dissolved: 30 September 2015
- Location: Kingswinford, West Midlands
- Coordinates: 52.4919°N 2.1693°W
- Type: Art, craft and social history museum
- Website: www.glassmuseum.org.uk

Broadfield House, a Grade II listed building, was home to a glass museum and hot glass studio, owned and operated by the Dudley Council museum service, in Kingswinford, West Midlands, England. The museum closed on 30 September 2015.

It displayed a huge variety of glass objects, dating from the 17th century to the present day, across nine galleries. In addition to the glass displays, the museum displayed several paintings that depict glassmaking and the local landscape. The museum also displayed glass-making tools and ephemera produced by the glass industry. Various events and temporary exhibitions were held throughout its history. To complete the visitor experience, it had a shop that sold souvenirs, books, vintage glassware, and products from contemporary glassmakers.

The collection is now displayed at Stourbridge Glass Museum.

== History of the building ==
The building has hosted many contrasting occupants. The original structure was a modest two-storey farmhouse built in the mid- or late 18th century, facing Barnett Lane. The threshing barn (now the Hot Glass Studio) dates from the same period and reminds us that two hundred years ago this area was open country and farmland. In the early 1800s, the house was transformed into a much grander residence when a fine three-storey Regency block with sash windows and a portico was built onto the back of the original building. This then formed the main entrance, reversing the original house's orientation.

In 1943, Kenneth George MacMaster, an engineering contractor and property developer, purchased the house along with 16 acres. The following year, MacMaster sold the house to Dennis Smith from Tividale. Smith was the last private owner of Broadfield House and lived here with his family until 1949. In 1949, Staffordshire County Council acquired the house for use as a Mothercraft Hostel.

Following local government reorganisation in 1966, ownership was transferred to the enlarged County Borough of Dudley. In 1969 Broadfield House became an Old People’s Home. It was not a suitable site, as shown by the 44 stairs and lack of a lift. Following the creation of Dudley MBC in 1974, the Council closed the home and began looking at alternative uses for the building. Inevitably, the Mothercraft Hostel and Old People's Home left their mark on the building, and features remain that suggest an institutional use.

In 1976, the idea emerged of using the building as a new home for the Council’s Brierley Hill and Stourbridge Glass Collections. This met with considerable opposition, as the people of Brierley Hill and Stourbridge were protective of their collections and did not want them moved from their towns. At the final Council meeting, the decision to go ahead won by only one vote! Conversion work began in 1979 and Princess Michael of Kent officially opened Broadfield House Glass Museum on 2 April 1980.

The museum closed on 30 September 2015. The collection is now displayed at Stourbridge Glass Museum, which opened on 9 April 2022.

== Exhibitions ==
The museum held various temporary exhibitions, with local, national and international artists represented, featuring historical and contemporary glassworks.

== The Studio ==
The Hulbert Group of Dudley sponsors the Hot Glass Studio and has been made available for use by graduates and established glass-blowers.

== Archives and Library ==
The museum housed archives from various sources, including pattern books, catalogues, description books, and invoices. In addition, there is a large collection of images and recorded material providing insight into the people and the manufacturing process. It also housed an extensive reference library on glassworking, including the entire library of Robert Charleston, former head of glass and ceramics at the Victoria & Albert Museum. The Charleston library includes approximately 700 books as well as his own collection of papers, articles and archival material. Both the library and archive will remain in the care of DMBC Museum Service.
