= Glass cutter =

Tool

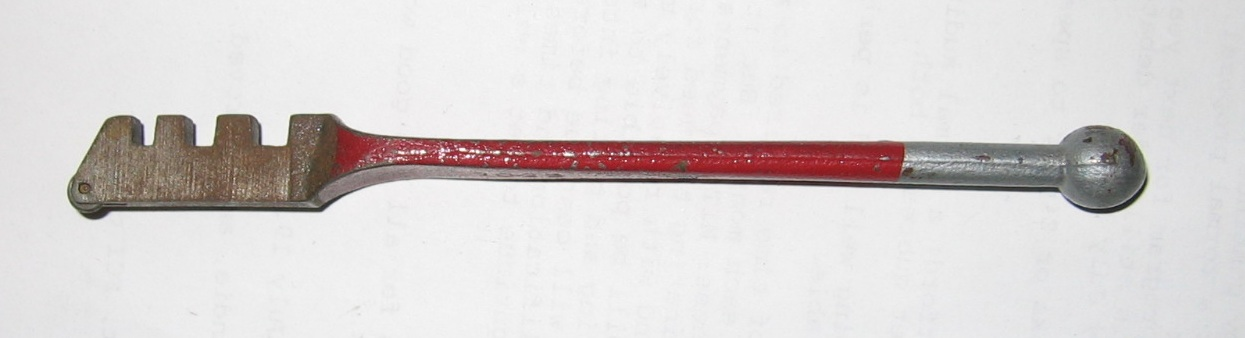
Glass cutter, showing hardened steel cutting wheel (far left), notches for snapping, and ball (on end of handle) for tapping

A glass cutter is a tool used to make a shallow score in one surface of a piece of glass (normally a flat one) that is to be broken in two pieces, for example to fit a window. The scoring makes a split in the surface of the glass which encourages the glass to break along the score. This is not to be confused with the tools used to make cut glass objects.

Regular, annealed glass can be broken apart this way but not tempered glass as the latter tends to shatter rather than breaking cleanly into two pieces.

== History ==
In the Middle Ages, glass was cut with a heated and sharply pointed iron rod. The red hot point was drawn along the moistened surface of the glass causing it to snap apart. Fractures created in this way were not very accurate and the rough pieces had to be chipped or "grozed" down to more exact shapes with a hooked tool called a grozing iron.

Between the 14th and 16th centuries, starting in Italy, a diamond-tipped cutter became prevalent which allowed for more precise cutting.

In 1869, the wheel cutter was developed by Samuel Monce of Bristol, Connecticut, which remains the current standard tool for most glass cutting.

== Cutting process ==
A glass cutter may use a diamond to create the split, but more commonly a small cutting wheel made of hardened steel or tungsten carbide 4–6 mm in diameter with a V-shaped profile called a "hone angle" is used. The greater the hone angle of the wheel, the sharper the angle of the vee and the thicker the piece of glass it is designed to cut.

The hone angle on most hand-held glass cutters is 120° to 140°, though wheels are made as near-flat as 154° or even 160° [180° would be flat like a roller] for cutting glass as thick as 0.5 inches (13 mm). Their main drawback is that wheels with sharper hone angles will become dull more quickly than their more obtuse counterparts.

=== Lubrication ===
The effective cutting of glass also requires a small amount of oil (kerosene is often used) and some glass cutters contain a reservoir of this oil which both lubricates the wheel and prevents it from becoming too hot: as the wheel scores, friction between it and the glass surface briefly generates intense heat, and oil dissipates this efficiently.

When properly lubricated a steel wheel can give a long period of satisfactory service. However, tungsten carbide wheels have been proven to have a significantly longer life than steel wheels and offer greater and more reproducible penetration in scoring as well as easier opening of the scored glass.

=== Cutting ===
The cutter is then rolled firmly over the glass, producing a "score line" or "fissure," weakening the glass along this line. Pressure as light as 5 or 6 pounds, upon a 120 to 140 degree wheel on thin glass; Pressure as heavy as 20+ pounds, with a 154 to 160 degree wheel, on very thick glass. The well-scored pane is ready to be split. The glass may be further weakened by lightly tapping along the cut. The glass cutter in the photo has a ball on one end for tapping the glass. Running pliers may then be used to "run" or "open" to the split.

=== Wheel diameter ===
Glass cutters are manufactured with wheels of varying diameters. One of the most popular has a diameter of 5.5 mm (7/32 in). The ratio between the arc of the wheel and the pressure applied with the tool has an important bearing on the degree of penetration. Average hand pressure with this size wheel often gives good results. For a duller wheel on soft glass a larger wheel (e.g., 6 mm (1/4 in) will require no change in hand pressure. A smaller wheel (3 mm (1/8 in)) is appropriate for cutting patterns and curves since a smaller wheel can follow curved lines without dragging.

General purpose glass is mostly made by the float glass process and is obtainable in thicknesses from 1.5 to 25 mm (1/16 to 1 in). Thin float glass tends to cut easily with a sharp cutter. Thicker glass such as 10 mm (3/8 in) float glass is significantly more difficult to cut and break; glass with textured or patterned surfaces may demand specialized methods for scoring and opening the cuts.

=== Large sheets ===
Large sheets of glass are usually cut with a computer-assisted (CNC) semi-automatic glass cutting table. These sheets are then broken out by hand into the individual sheets of glass (also known as "lites" in the glass industry).

== See also ==
- Cutting
- Computer numerical control (CNC)
- Water jet cutter
