= Woodcross =

Area of Wolverhampton, England

Coordinates: 52.550°N 2.105°W

- Location within the West Midlands
- Population: 5,044 (2001 Census)
- Metropolitan borough: Wolverhampton
- Metropolitan county: West Midlands
- Region: West Midlands
- Country: England
- Sovereign state: United Kingdom
- Post town: BILSTON
- Postcode district: WV14
- Dialling code: 01902
- Police: West Midlands
- Fire: West Midlands
- Ambulance: West Midlands
- UK Parliament: Wolverhampton South East

Woodcross is a residential area of Wolverhampton, West Midlands, England. The area traditionally existed within the boundaries of Sedgley and later Coseley until 1966.

== History ==
The first known record of the name was in 1614, where it was recorded as Woodcrosse – likely meaning 'the cross at the wood' or 'the wooden cross'.
Prior to 1930, Woodcross was a largely rural area which consisted of a few residential properties on the slope of Beacon Hill as well as extensive farmland. But over the next 40 years, the area was heavily developed for housing (most of which was built by Coseley UDC).

Woodcross borders Ettingshall and Lanesfield to the north, Sedgley to the west, Woodsetton to the south and Coseley / Roseville to the south and east.

== Today ==
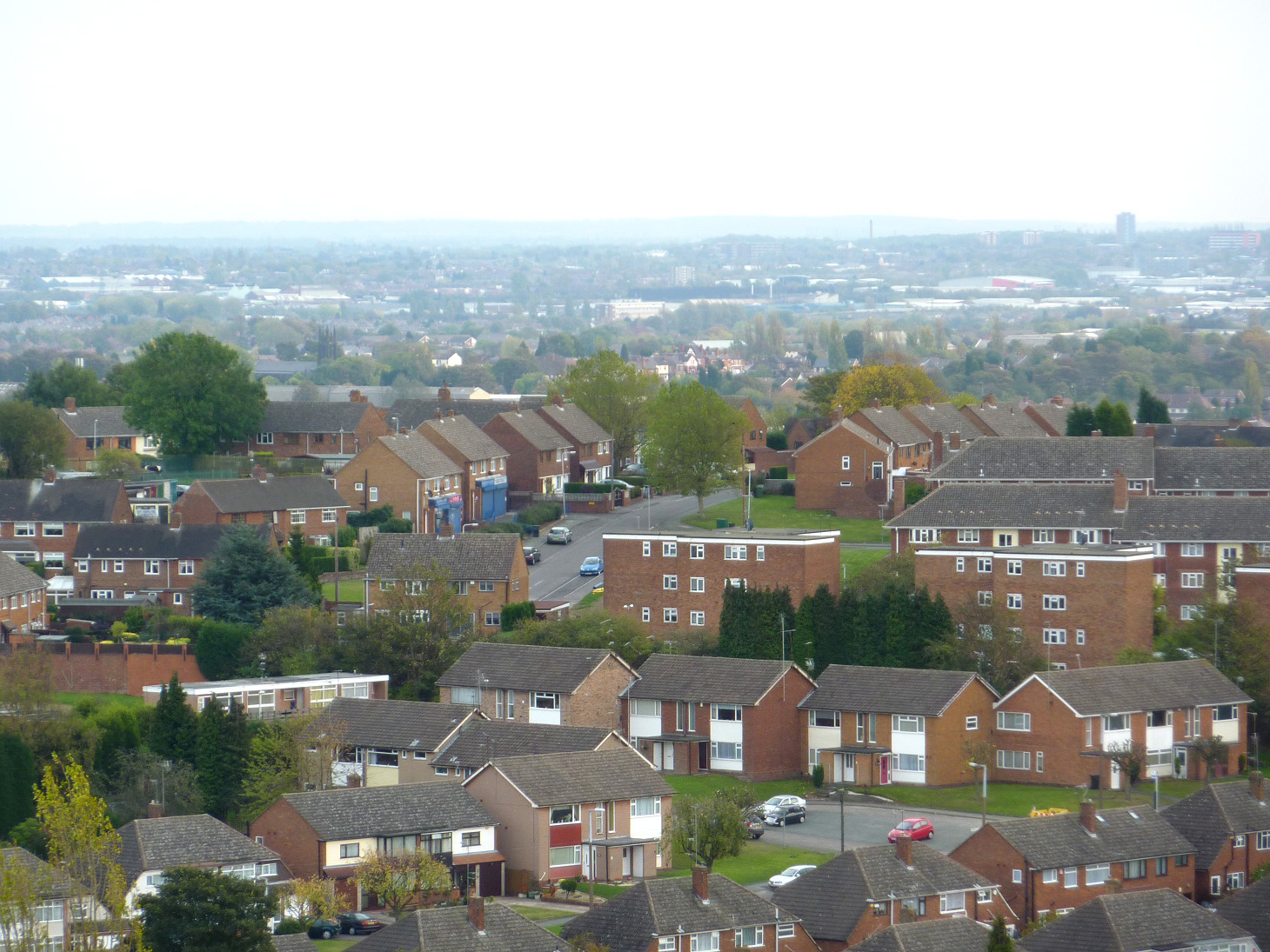
Woodcross as viewed from Beacon Hill, Sedgley

Notable landmarks in Woodcross are Beacon Hill Cemetery, Manor Primary School and St Mary's Church. There is also a statue in honour of local doctor Frederick Baker, who died in 1912, that is located on the corner of Hall Lane and Gorge Road.

Woodcross was a largely rural area until the 1930s when Coseley Urban District Council built a number of houses in and around Woodcross Lane. After the end of World War II in 1945, the Council built many more houses, this time creating a large estate with many streets named after Coseley councillors and famous local people, including Tipton born runner Jack Holden, whose name is featured on Jack Holden Avenue.

The 2001 Census tells us that the majority of Woodcross's population is of English ethnicity (89.4% White British), with the largest minority population being of Indian ethnicity (5.2% Asian Indian).

Woodcross is served by Manor Primary School, for pupils aged 3–11 years. It began life in 1933, when Woodcross was still in the early stages of development, as Manor Secondary School for pupils aged 11 and above. However, the vast growth of Woodcross and nearby Lanesfield, as well as the construction of the new Ettingshall Park estate, after World War II led to increased pressure on places at the school, and it was replaced by Parkfield Secondary Modern School on Lawnswood Avenue, Lanesfield, in April 1962. Manor Primary School opened in its buildings in September 1962.

The nearest railway station is Coseley on the Wolverhampton to Birmingham line. West Midlands Trains services operate every 30 minutes serving all stations with additional express services towards Birmingham New Street or Wolverhampton.

Bus services in Woodcross include services 81 between Wolverhampton and Dudley and 223/224 between Bilston and Sedgley, service 223 continuing to Gornal Wood and Dudley. In addition frequent buses operate along Birmingham New Road towards Wolverhampton and Roseville. Services are operated by National Express West Midlands, Diamond Bus, Carolean and Banga Bus.
