= Christ Church, Coseley =

Christ Church
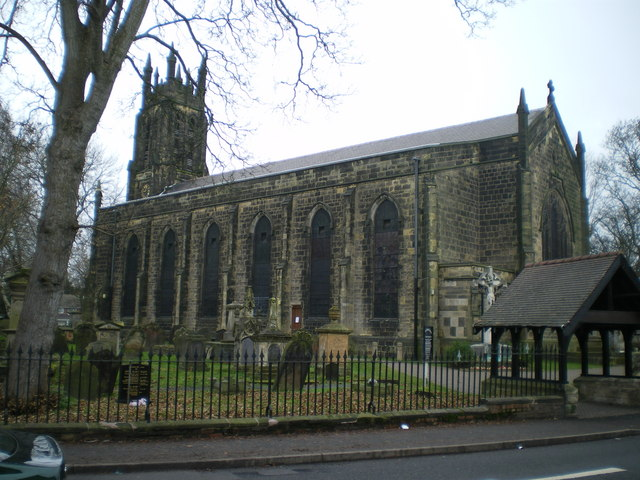
- Christ Church
- 52°32′46.1″N 2°4′48.31″W
- OS grid reference: SO 94666 94257
- Location: Coseley, West Midlands
- Country: England
- Denomination: Church of England
- Website: www.christchurchandstmarys.co.uk

History
- Consecrated: 27 August 1830

Architecture
- Heritage designation: Grade II
- Designated: 9 April 1976
- Architect: Thomas Lee

Administration
- Diocese: Worcester
- Deanery: Greater Dudley
- Parish: Coseley

Clergy
- Bishop: Martin Gorick
- Priest: Reverend Emma J. Stanford

Christ Church is an Anglican church in Coseley, West Midlands, England, and in the Diocese of Worcester. It was built in 1830; the interior has many additions of the late 19th and early 20th century. It is Grade II listed.

== Description ==
=== Early history ===
In 1825, when industry in the area had led to an increase in population, the Earl of Dudley, the lord of the manor, gave land for the building of a church in Coseley. He also offered to pay for the rebuilding of All Saints' Church in Sedgley; funds originally allocated to that project, from the Church Commissioners and public subscription, were diverted to the building of Christ Church.

The church is a Commissioners' church, designed by Thomas Lee, who was also the architect of the rebuilt church in Sedgley, and the Church of St Andrew, Netherton. The first stone was laid on 9 August 1827 by Henry Ryder, Bishop of Lichfield, and it was consecrated on 27 August 1830. It was a chapel of ease to Sedgley parish church until 1832, when Coseley became a separate parish.

It is built of Gornal stone, with slate roofs, and has a west tower. Inside, there are perpendicular-style arcades of six bays separating the nave from the north and south aisles. A peal of eight bells was installed in 1847, replacing a single bell. The chancel was extended by 15 feet (4.6 m) in 1866, by William Bourne of Dudley.

=== Later modifications ===
William Spencer was the incumbent from 1883 to 1912; his family owned a steelworks in Northumberland, and he and his father financed improvements to the church, particularly the oak rood screen of 1904, carved by Advent Hunstone, and the fittings of the lady chapel, described in the listing text as "a tour-de-force of Edwardian design".

The oak reredos, with a central relief of the Last Supper, was installed about 1906. Stained glass, mostly of the late 19th or early 20th century, includes the east window of 1906 by Morris & Co.; in the south aisle there is a large window of 1957 by Hardman & Co.
