= History of the West Midlands =

The West Midlands county straddles the historic borders between the counties of Warwickshire (Birmingham and Coventry), Staffordshire in the north, and Worcestershire in the south.

== Economic history ==
Coventry was one of England's most important cities during the Middle Ages, its prosperity built upon wool and cloth manufacture. Birmingham and Wolverhampton have a tradition of industry dating back to the 16th century when small metal-working industries developed. Birmingham was known for its manufacture of small arms, whereas Wolverhampton became a centre for lock manufacture and brass working.

Birmingham and Coventry became important centres of the car industry from the early 20th century. The Austin car plant was built in 1905 at Longbridge, to the south of Birmingham, and gradually expanded over the next 75 years, but closed down in 2005 on the bankruptcy of MG Rover. Since 2007, part of the former Longbridge plant has been retained by new owners Nanjing Automobile for the production of MG Cars. Cars produced at the Longbridge plant included the Austin Seven (launched in 1922), the Mini (1959), BMC/BL 1100/1300 saloons and estates (1962) and Austin Metro (1980).

Coventry became the centre of the British car industry, dominated by the Jaguar plant near Coundon, the Triumph plant at Canley, and the Rootes Group's Ryton plant just beyond the city's eastern boundary. However, the Canley plant was closed by British Leyland in 1980, followed more than 20 years later by the Jaguar plant, and finally the former Rootes plant (taken over by Peugeot at the end of the 1970s), meaning that there was virtually no vehicle production remaining in Coventry by 2007.

Castle Bromwich Assembly was built in the late 1930s for the manufacture of Spitfire aircraft, which continued throughout World War II. Aircraft manufacturing at the plant continued until 1977, when it was sold to Jaguar for car production. The factory remains in use four decades later. Around the same time that the Castle Bromwich Assembly was built, the government built a shadow factory at Solihull, which produced aircraft for the war effort. After the war, the plant was taken over by Rover cars, who relocated from their Lode Lane plant in Coventry. The Land Rover, Britain's first four-wheel drive off-road vehicle, was first produced at the Solihull factory in 1948. The factory expanded and increased in productivity over the subsequent decades to allow for the production of Rover, Land Rover and more recently Jaguar cars.

The coal and iron ore deposits of the Black Country area provided a ready source of raw material. The area grew rapidly during the Industrial Revolution, and by the 20th century had grown into one large conurbation. However, the Black Country's coal mining industry was in decline by the early 20th century and the last coal pit in the area, Baggeridge Colliery at Sedgley, closed in 1968. Heavy industry began to decline in the 1970s and 1980s, with towns including Bilston, Darlaston, Wednesbury, Tipton and Brierley Hill being hit particularly hard by factory closures. However, new lighter industry began to develop in some of these areas, with a large retail park developing in the north of Wednesbury during the 1990s and a light industrial estate being built in the south of the town. Brierley Hill became home to the Merry Hill Shopping Centre, which developed between 1985 and 1990. Many of the former industrial sites in Tipton, however, have been mostly developed for new housing. Oldbury has retained a significant amount of manufacturing while also enjoying a significant growth in the retail sector, with a string of retail developments having appeared around the town since 1980.

Coventry was slower to develop, but by the early 20th century had become an important centre for bicycle and car manufacture, soon becoming Britain's most important area for car manufacturing. The city's population soared during the interwar years as a result, and expansion continued after World War II, along with rebuilding following the city's severe wartime bomb damage. A number of factories were built in the city for the wartime effort, including a Daimler shadow plant in the north-west of the city, which was taken over by Jaguar in 1951 and remained the carmaker's main site until 2005, when the factory was closed and the company concentrated on its factories at Castle Bromwich near Birmingham and the Halewood plant (originally a Ford facility) near Liverpool. The Rootes Group, whose brands including Hillman, Singer and Sunbeam, opened a factory at Ryton to the east of the city at the start of World War II, and in peacetime it was converted for car production. Such was the success of the company in the postwar era that it opened another factory at Linwood in Scotland in 1963, just before its takeover by American carmaking giant Chrysler, but financial difficulties saw the company being taken over by French carmaker Peugeot in 1978. From 1986, the plant was used by Peugeot for production of its own cars after it discontinued the Talbot brand, but in December 2006 the plant was closed down, leaving the city with virtually no car industry remaining.

The growth of the area in the 19th century, which attracted thousands of families from rural communities, led to extensive building of houses across the region. Many villages grew into towns, while others swallowed up neighbouring communities. However, this led to overpopulation in many areas, with a large percentage of the region's population living in unfit housing by the early 20th century. This led to the extensive construction of council housing, mostly on new suburban housing estates. Notable developments in the region during this era include Weoley Castle in Birmingham, Low Hill in Wolverhampton, the Priory Estate in Dudley, Friar Park in West Bromwich and Blakenall Heath in Walsall.

The region suffered significant air raid damage by the Luftwaffe during World War II, with thousands of buildings damaged and people killed or seriously injured in Birmingham and Coventry, while there was a lesser degree of bomb damage in towns including Dudley, Tipton and West Bromwich. Several of the less densely populated areas, including Sedgley, Stourbridge and Halesowen, suffered little or no bomb damage.

The rebuilding of the region continued after World War II. The region's first multi-storey flats were built in the 1950s, although these were mostly built in the larger towns where space for housebuilding was already very limited. Some of the region's population was rehoused in the new town of Telford in Shropshire which was developed mostly in the 1960s and 1970s, or in expanded towns like Redditch in Worcestershire. The largest housing development in the Midlands during the postwar era was the Castle Vale estate in Birmingham, which was dominated by multi-storey flats, with 34 blocks being built. Many inner city areas and town centres became less densely populated as a result of this continued regeneration of housing.

The area also became connected to the new motorway network in the 1960s, with the M5 motorway terminating between Walsall and West Bromwich, and when completed it gave the region a direct link to areas in the south of England including Bristol and Exeter. The M6 motorway joined up with the M1 motorway to the south, giving the area a direct motorway link to London, and gave a direct motorway link to Liverpool and Manchester in the north. The M42 motorway was developed around the south of Birmingham to serve Birmingham Airport as well as nearby towns including Redditch, Bromsgrove and Tamworth, during the 1970s and 1980s. The M54 motorway, linking the area with Telford, was built around the same time. The M40 motorway was completed in January 1991, giving the area its second motorway link with London, as well as improving its links with the South Coast seaports of Southampton and Portsmouth, along with the university city of Oxford.

In 2003, Britain's first toll motorway, the M6 Toll, opened, bypassing the West Midlands to the north.

== Sport ==
The West Midlands also has a strong association with professional sport.

Warwickshire CC, the first class county cricket team, is based at Edgbaston, Birmingham.

Aston Villa, West Bromwich Albion and Wolverhampton Wanderers were all founder members of the Football League in 1888, and were joined within a few years by Birmingham City and later a fifth team, Walsall. Aston Villa were the English league's most successful teams during its first 25 years, winning the league title and FA Cup on many occasions, as well as being the first winners of the Football League Cup in 1961, and one of several English teams to have won the European Cup when they lifted it in 1982. West Bromwich Albion were league champions in 1920 and had won the FA Cup five times by 1968, as well as the League Cup in 1966. Wolverhampton Wanderers enjoyed their most successful era during the 1950s, when they were league champions three times, and have also won a total of four FA Cups and two League Cups. Birmingham City have been less successful, their only two major trophies being two victories in the Football League Cup, while Walsall have yet to reach the top division of English football or win a major trophy.

== Civic history ==
During the 20th century a number of attempts were made to improve the local government of the area.

The West Midlands was one of five "Special Review Areas" named in the Local Government Act 1958. The Local Government Commission for England established by the Act was charged with:

"the duty of reviewing the organisation of local government... and of making such proposals as are hereinafter authorised for effecting changes appearing... desirable in the interests of effective and convenient local government."

The West Midlands Special Review Area was almost identical to the metropolitan county as created in 1974 (with the exception of the Meriden Gap and Coventry).

The commission's report lead to a substantial reform in the local government of the area in 1966 as the patchwork of county boroughs with municipal boroughs and urban districts in between was replaced by a core of county boroughs covering a contiguous area. The former Royal Borough of Sutton Coldfield was absorbed into Birmingham, while an expanded Wolverhampton borough took in Bilston, Wednesfield and Tettenhall as well as a large section of Coseley and smaller sections of areas including Sedgley. The Borough of Dudley was also expanded, taking in most of Sedgley and Brierley Hill as well as the southern section of Coseley. An expanded West Bromwich borough took in the bulk of Tipton and Wednesbury, while the Walsall borough was expanded to take in Darlaston and Willenhall. The County Borough of Warley was also created, centred on the former boroughs of Oldbury, Smethwick and Rowley Regis.

On 1 October 1969, West Midlands Passenger Transport Authority was established, which covered the county boroughs, the urban districts bordering these, as well as Cannock, Redditch and some surrounding rural districts.

The Redcliffe-Maud Report commissioned by Harold Wilson's Labour Party government recommended that a large "metropolitan area" be created around the Birmingham/Black Country conurbation, also including its rural hinterland. This was to have been divided into seven districts: Mid-Staffordshire (Tamworth, Rugeley, Lichfield, Cannock, Stafford), Wolverhampton, Walsall, Dudley, West Bromwich-Warley (later Sandwell), Birmingham/Solihull, North Worcestershire (Bewdley, Kidderminster, Bromsgrove, Redditch).

In the event the Conservative government of Edward Heath was elected in 1970 and the original plans for local government reform were radically altered. The West Midlands county was created in 1974, under the Local Government Act 1972.

This area was based on the seven county boroughs and four other non-county boroughs and urban districts around the fringe of the conurbation – Aldridge-Brownhills, Halesowen, Stourbridge, and Sutton Coldfield. The area was divided into seven new metropolitan boroughs – Aldridge-Brownhills was added to Walsall; Halesowen and Stourbridge to Dudley and Sutton Coldfield to Birmingham. A new borough of Sandwell was formed by the merger of West Bromwich and Warley, Solihull took in much of the suburban fringe to the east of Birmingham and the gap between Solihull and Coventry, whilst Wolverhampton and Coventry were also included, with their boundaries very much the same as they had been since the 1966 reorganisation.

This led to (apart from in the east, with Coventry and the Meriden Gap) quite a tightly defined metropolitan border, excluding such places as Burntwood, Bromsgrove, Cannock, Kidderminster, Lichfield and Wombourne which had been considered for inclusion in the West Midlands metropolitan area by the Redcliffe-Maud Report, but excluding only a small amount that was considered part of the contiguous built-up area of the West Midlands conurbation in 2001.

The inclusion of Coventry into the new county was at the time highly controversial, as many people felt that Coventry had more in common with the surrounding Warwickshire area then with the Birmingham conurbation. There have been calls for Coventry to be more integrated with the surrounding Warwickshire area – which to some extent have been heeded with the creation of a Coventry and Warwickshire NHS trust and a C&W chamber of commerce.

The 1974 reform created a West Midlands County Council that covered the entire area and dealt with strategic issues. A new West Midlands Police service was formed covering the entire area, with the West Midlands Constabulary and Birmingham City Police abolished, and also taking over responsibility from the county forces. Margaret Thatcher's government abolished the metropolitan county councils with the Local Government Act 1985, in 1986, causing the seven metropolitan boroughs to become de facto unitary authorities. This move also saw the abolition of the Greater London Council as well as the metropolitan councils for Merseyside, Greater Manchester, Tyne and Wear, Humberside and Avon.
