= Wren's Nest Estate =

Housing estate in Dudley, West Midlands, England

Coordinates: 52.528°N 2.103°W

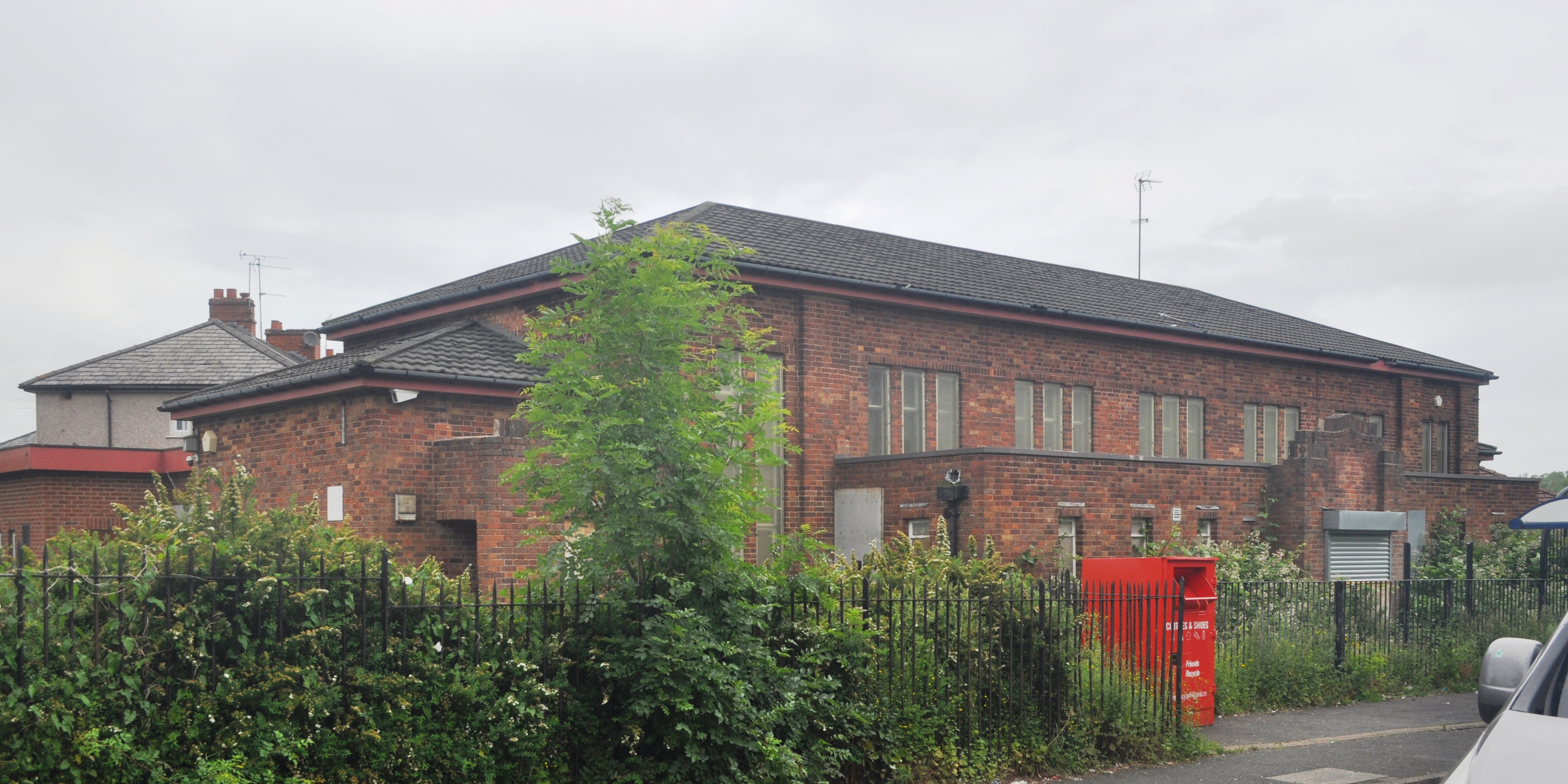
The former St Christopher's Church of England parish church

The Wren's Nest Estate is a housing estate located to the north west of the town centre of Dudley, West Midlands, England.

== History ==
=== Housing development ===
Local industrialisation was considerable in the early 20th century, as the district had become highly industrialised in the then heyday of the Black Country's industrial past.

The Wren's Nest Estate was mostly developed with council housing and between 1934 and 1939 to rehouse around 1,000 families from town centre slum clearances, along with the adjoining Priory Estate which was built around the same time. The land was historically in Sedgley (in the county of Staffordshire), but was transferred to Dudley in 1926 in order for the housing estates to be built.

The Old Park Farm Estate, another council housing development, was added in the early 1950s.

The estate has been served by a primary school, Wren's Nest Primary School on Marigold Crescent, since 14 October 1936. This initially served the 5–11 age ranges, later incorporating a nursery unit for 3- and 4-year-olds. Reorganisation saw the school extended to serve 12-year-olds from September 1972, only for it to revert to a 3–11 school from September 1990.

A secondary school, Wren's Nest Secondary School, opened in Wrens Hill Road on 15 April 1965 to replace Wolverhampton Street School as one of the town's 11+ secondary modern schools. It became a 12-16 school in September 1972 and its status changed to comprehensive in September 1975, when its name was changed to Mons Hill School. However, pupil numbers were declining by 1988 and the local council had decided to close the school with effect from July 1991. However, its closure was ultimately brought forward to July 1990, after which the remaining pupils and staff were split between Castle High and The Coseley School, and the Mons Hill buildings were incorporated into Dudley College, who completed a multi-million pound expansion of the site in 1993. However, the bulk of the Mons Hill site was redundant by September 2012, with the opening of new college buildings in Dudley town centre, and most of the former Mons Hill School buildings were demolished three years later, although the 1990s extensions remained in use as Dudley College's Construction Centre. This final phase of the college was vacated in July 2018 and taken over by The Wenlock School, catering for special needs pupils.

St Christopher's Parish Church opened on Summer Road on 22 April 1939, but closed during the 1970s. It was refurbished and re-opened as a community centre, being officially opened by the former Manchester United and England national football team player Bobby Charlton on 18 September 1982.

The Washington Public House opened on Wren's Nest Road on 10 December 1937, serving the estate for nearly 70 years until its closure and demolition in 2006. It has since been redeveloped for housing.

Further development took place around Wren's Nest Road during the 1950s, with a small number of bungalows being built, along with six blocks of three-storey flats. These developments were also made by the local council.

=== Modern times ===
By the 1980s, the Wren's Nest estate (known by those who live there as "The Renna") was blighted by crime, anti-social behaviour, sub-standard housing and high unemployment. Some families on the estate had even abandoned the decaying upstairs bedrooms and were sleeping in downstairs rooms, few of which were in a much better condition. The plight of people living in squalor on the Wren's Nest was highlighted in February 1985, in the second edition of the Dudley News.

However, the estate significantly improved during the 1990s due to a major regeneration project. Over £10million of new government money, via the Single Regeneration Budget, was invested into the area from 1994, when the regeneration of the estate got underway. This saw the introduction of improved youth activities, education programmes, community capacity initiatives managed by the council's Housing Department, green environmental improvements by Groundwork Black Country (including a vineyard at the rear of Meadow Road), and the creation of local newspapers and social enterprises via Co-operation Black Country. However, the most significant improvement was to the council-owned properties, which received new boundary walls, driveways, double glazing, and major heating and insulation works. Crime levels on the estate have also fallen since the mid 1990s, as has the unemployment rate, although this increased again between 2008 and 2012 due to another recession.

Demolition of three of the blocks of flats (built around 1960) on Wrens Nest Road took place in 1997, and a fourth block followed in 2000. A fifth block was converted into local authority office use in 1999 before finally being demolished in 2017 to make way for new housing. This has left just one block of flats remaining. The site of one of the demolished blocks of flats was redeveloped as The Greens Health Centre, which opened in April 2000.

== The former local mine ==
During the height of the Industrial Revolution, up to 20,000 tons of limestone was removed the local Wren's Nest quarry annually until closure in 1924 and permanent abandonment in 1925, along with the adjoining Canal Basin.

== The former mineral line and canal basin ==
A mineral line once connected the local Wren's Nest quarry to the Seven Sister Tunnels and Dudley station as this 1930's O.S. map shows-. The line was not present in 1903 as this- 1903 O.S. map illustrates and was cut back by the Wren's Nest Estate by 1948 as this- 1948 O.S map points out. It was used as a long siding by local freight trains after the pit closed and was removed by the early 1950s. This was preceded by a canal basin that lead to the Dudley Canal at the Dudley Tunnel. All of them are now closed and removed, with the tunnels being blocked up for safety reasons.

== People ==
People from Wren's Nest include:

- Percy Shakespeare (1906–1943), painter

== See also ==
- Gornal
- Kates Hill estate
- Russells Hall Estate
- Kingswinford
- Dudley Tunnel
- Dudley Freightliner Terminal
