= Beacon Hill, Sedgley =

Hill in Sedgley, West Midlands, England

Beacon Hill
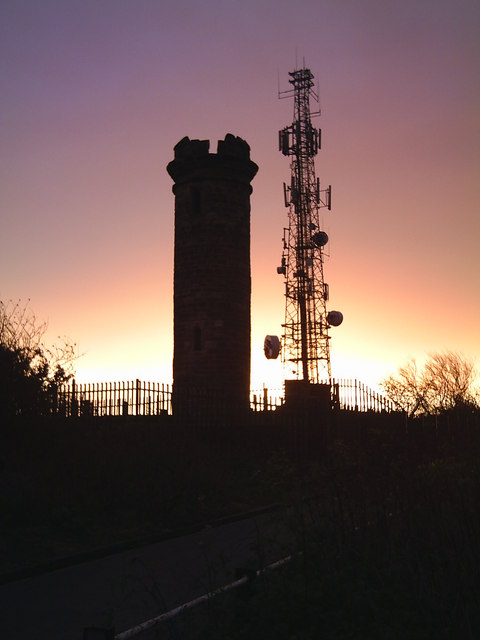
- Beacon Tower and transmission mast

Highest point
- Elevation: 237 m (778 ft)
- Coordinates: 52.5475°N 2.1153°W

Geography
- Location: Sedgley, England

Beacon Hill in Sedgley, England, is one of the highest points in the West Midlands, at 237 metres (778 ft) above sea level.

From the summit, Wolverhampton, Walsall and Birmingham are all visible, as is the Staffordshire, Shropshire and Welsh countryside to the west. The hill is so named as historically it was one in a series of prominent locations with beacons on top, where a fire would be lit as a signal during times of war or turmoil. The Sedgley beacon lies between beacons at Barr Beacon and Cannock Chase. At the highest point, a Grade II listed tower erected in 1846 by Lord Wrottesley for astronomy, stands on the site of an earlier tower, which sits on the spot of the original beacon.

When the tower was climbable (today a fence restricts access as the steps inside were removed by the council to prevent access), it was often said the Bristol Channel was visible on a clear day.. However, these claims are false as the website www.viewfinderpanoramas.org shows the southern view to extend only as far as Stinchcombe Hill near Dursley, Gloucestershire.

Approximately half of Beacon Hill was situated in the urban district of Coseley, which was created in 1897 from the eastern half of the old Sedgley manor. This section included the Beacon Tower.

However, the local government reorganisation of 1966 (which saw the bulk of Sedgley and approximately half of Coseley incorporated into Dudley) resulted in the creation of post code districts, with all of Beacon Hill being included in the new Sedgley DY3 post code district.

== Today ==
The Beacon housing estate sits near the tower monument on Beacon Hill. It was initially developed by Sedgley UDC in the 1920s, with a further section being added in the 1930s and the final section being developed after the end of World War II.

By 2024, the area was being plagued with anti social behaviour, vandalism and car thefts.

The Beacon Hill Tenants & Residents Association look after and clean up the hill, and have been responsible for the erection of gates and fences in an effort to prevent vandalism and fly tipping in the area.
