= The Coseley School =

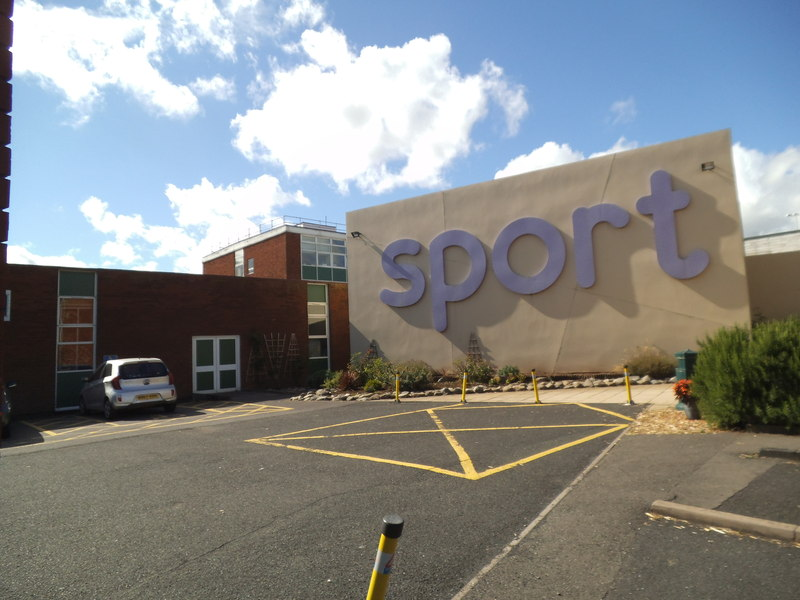
- The Coseley School

Location
- Henne Drive; Coseley, West Midlands, WV14 9JW; England; 52°32′45″N 2°05′25″W

Information
- Type: Foundation school
- Established: 1968
- Closed: 2017
- Local authority: Dudley
- Department for Education URN: 103857 Tables
- Ofsted: Reports
- Head teacher: April Garrett
- Gender: Mixed
- Age range: 11-16
- Colours: Black
- Website: www.coseley.dudley.sch.uk

The Coseley School was a mixed secondary school located in Coseley, West Midlands, England.

The school closed in July 2017, in a phased closure, when the pupils who started in September 2012 completed their GCSE studies, while the younger three year groups were transferred to other schools from September 2016; with Dormston or High Arcal in neighbouring Sedgley being the most popular destinations. The site is now mothballed, with the intention of re-opening it to cater for the likely increase in secondary school pupils living in Coseley following the construction of a new housing development on the former Bean Industries and Newey Goodman sites in the south of the town.

== History ==
The Coseley School opened in September 1968 as a secondary modern school for children aged between 11 and 16 years, although building work delays meant that pupils had to be bussed to classrooms at Ellowes Hall School for a term until the buildings in Ivyhouse Lane were ready for occupation in January 1969. The school was officially opened by Education Secretary, Edward Short in November 1969. It had 23 acres (9.3 ha) of playing fields. The age range was reorganised to 12-16 in September 1972, when the school took in the remaining pupils at nearby Mount Pleasant Senior School. Coseley converted to comprehensive status in September 1975, and in September 1990 became an 11–16 school. Further expansion took place at this time when Coseley took in approximately half of the pupils and staff from Mons Hill School in Dudley, which had closed that summer.

In March 2008, Dudley Council's cabinet member for children's services claimed that there was a "50/50 chance" of Coseley School (or possibly either nearby Dormston or High Arcal) closing within the next 10 years. This came after 147 pupils leaving primary school in 2007 put Coseley as their first choice when it had a maximum of 195 places available. This would have left Coseley without a secondary school for the first time since the 19th century. However, the council later stated that no more secondary schools were scheduled for closure in the borough, following the closure of Cradley High School at Halesowen in 2008, and the phased closure of Pensnett High School from 2010 to 2012.

In May 2016, Dudley Metropolitan Borough Council announced that The Coseley School would be closed due to falling pupil numbers and low pupil achievement. The school finally closed in July 2017, with all but the oldest pupils in the school being transferred to other schools from September 2016.
