= Gornal stone =

Late Silurian sandstone

Gornal stone is a late Silurian sandstone which originates from the Gornal area of Central England. It is part of the Downton Castle Sandstone Formation, which also occurs locally at Netherton, and in parts of Shropshire.

The stone was mostly quarried in the Lower Gornal area. Quarrying was underway by the 1810s, and the last quarry closed in 1971. At the peak of the quarrying, almost all buildings in the Sedgley manor (which also included the villages of Coseley, Woodsetton and Ettingshall) were built from Gornal stone, and numerous examples of the recognisable yellow rock remain, including several churches, houses and numerous old walls. The stone was used in the industrial development of the Black Country. It was almost 100% Silica (silicon dioxide) and had a high melting point. When ground into sand and mixed with fire clay it formed a refractory coating widely used in the steel industry to the west of Birmingham. This sandstone contained some of the earliest known Hemicyclaspis murchisoni fossils.
