= Ian Powell (businessman) =

English business executive

Sir Ian Powell
- Born: 16 March 1956 (age 70); Coseley, United Kingdom
- Education: Wolverhampton Polytechnic
- Occupations: Business executive, chartered accountant
- Years active: 1977–2022
- Known for: Former chairman at PricewaterhouseCoopers (PwC)

Sir Ian Clifford Powell (born 16 March 1956) is an English business executive and chartered accountant. He has been chairman of Capita since 2017. He was previously chairman and senior partner at PricewaterhouseCoopers (2008–2016)

== Early life and education ==
Born in 1956 in Coseley, Powell attended High Arcal Grammar School and then studied economics at Wolverhampton Polytechnic, graduating with a BA in 1977.

== Career ==
In 1977, Powell joined the professional services firm Price Waterhouse (later PricewaterhouseCoopers) as a trainee. He worked in assurance until 1986, when he moved to the firm's Business Recovery Services division. Made partner in 1991, he sat on the firm's UK management board from 2006 to 2008. In 2008, he became its senior partner and chairman. He left these roles and PwC in June 2016.

In January 2017, Powell was appointed chairman of Capita.

== Other positions ==
Powell has been chairman of Police Now since 2016. He has also been on the board of trustees of The Old Vic theatre since 2016 and the board of London First since 2018.

== Recognition ==
In 2010, Powell received an honorary Doctor of Business Administration (DBA) degree from the University of Wolverhampton. He was knighted in the 2017 New Year Honours for "services to professional services and volunteer service".

== Personal life ==
Powell is married, with four children.
