= Ellowes Hall =

Coordinates: 52.5261°N 2.1295°W

Ellowes Hall was a stately home located in Sedgley, Staffordshire (now West Midlands).

It was built in 1821 in parkland near Lower Gornal village as the home of wealthy local ironmonger John Fereday and his family. Over the next 100 years or more, successive different wealthy owners lived in the house. It remained in the ownership of the Fereday family until 1850, when it was sold to fellow industrialist William Baldwin until 1865, when it became the residence of Charles Cochrane, Mayor of Dudley. The next resident was Sir Horace St Paul, who moved there in the early 1870s and lived there until his death in 1891. The next occupant was Bilston county councillor John Gibbons, who lived there until his death in 1919, when it was sold to the Mitchell family. The Mitchell family lived in the house until 1923, when it was sold to Henry Arthur Nock, who owned the house until his death in 1946. After the outbreak of the Second World War in 1939, Ellowes Hall was used as a Home Guard headquarters.

The Nock family sold the house to Staffordshire Education Authority in 1963, and it was demolished in 1964 - the same year that a new secondary school with the same name was built within its grounds.

More than 40 years on, the "old coach road" which connected the hall with nearby Moden Hill is still in existence as a public footpath, but motor vehicles are no longer allowed to use it. The surrounding woodland, which forms part of Cotwall End Valley, is still known locally as Ellowes Hall Wood.
