= Len Millard =

English footballer

Personal information
- Full name: Leonard Millard
- Date of birth: 7 March 1919
- Place of birth: Coseley, Staffordshire, England
- Date of death: 15 March 1997 (aged 78)
- Place of death: Coseley, Dudley, England
- Position: Left back

Senior career*
Years	Team	Apps	(Gls)
1946–1958	West Bromwich Albion	436	(7)
- * Club domestic league appearances and goals

Leonard Millard (7 March 1919 – 15 March 1997) was an English footballer who played the majority of his career at left back.

== Biography ==
Millard was born in Coseley, Staffordshire and joined West Bromwich Albion as an amateur in May 1937. He turned professional in September 1942, having already made his debut during the previous month against Northampton Town in the Football League South. He later became club captain, leading the club to a 3–2 victory over Preston North End in the 1954 FA Cup final at Wembley. He made a total of 476 appearances for Albion. In 1989, he had a leg amputated and he died in Coseley in 1997.

== Honours ==
West Bromwich Albion

- FA Cup: 1953–54
