= Beacon Hill Academy, Dudley =

Beacon Hill Academy
- Logo of the school

Location
- High Arcal Drive; Sedgley, Dudley, West Midlands, DY3 1BP; England; 52°32′01″N 2°06′34″W

Information
- Type: Academy
- Established: 2018 (as a Trust academy)
- Local authority: Dudley
- Trust: Dudley Academies Trust
- Department for Education URN: 137705 Tables
- Ofsted: Reports
- Principal: Sukhjot Dhami
- Gender: Mixed
- Age: 11 to 16
- Capacity: 1210
- Website: http://www.beaconhillacademy.org.uk/

Beacon Hill Academy, formerly known as The High Arcal School, is a secondary school in the Sedgley area of Dudley, in the English West Midlands. Originally opened as a grammar school in 1961, the school became a comprehensive in 1975. It adopted its current name in September 2018, after joining the Dudley Academies Trust.

== History ==
The large population growth of the Sedgley and Coseley urban districts during the interwar and early postwar years saw rising demand for secondary school places, with Sedgley and Coseley only providing secondary modern education, meaning that pupils who passed the entry examination for grammar schools had to attend establishments in neighbouring districts including Dudley and Wolverhampton. Plans for a grammar school to serve the two districts emerged during the 1950s, and the High Arcal Grammar School finally opened in September 1961. Control of the school passed to Dudley Council in April 1966 as a result of Sedgley's amalgamation into Dudley.

As with other schools in Dudley, the school's age range was altered to 12–18 from September 1972. In September 1975 it became a comprehensive school, taking in a new catchment area centred around the Upper Gornal and Woodsetton areas of Sedgley, although the catchment area rules were gradually relaxed during the 1980s and into the 1990s, with a growing number of pupils from Coseley, Dudley and Tipton joining the school. Its sixth form centre closed in July 1990 as part of a fresh reorganisation by the local authority, and from September of the following year, the age range was altered to 11–16. In September 2002 a new sixth form was opened at the school by Dudley College.

In December 2011, the school hosted a broadcast of the BBC Radio 4 show Any Questions?. This event was later repeated in December 2019 in the run up to the general election.

In September 2017, the school became part of the Dudley Academies Trust, alongside Castle High School (St. James Academy), The Hillcrest School (The Link Academy), and Holly Hall School (Pegasus Academy), in association with Dudley College. Its name was officially changed to Beacon Hill Academy the following year.

== Headteachers ==
Despite first opening in 1961, the school has only had 7 headteachers in its 60-year history.

The first headteacher of the school was Laurence Ardern who served for 14 years from the schools opening until his retirement in July 1975. He was succeeded by John Gerrish who retired in December 1992 after serving the school for 17 years.

Jeffrey Williams, who had previously been a geography teacher at the school, then returned to the school as headteacher; he resigned in August 2006 after 14 years of service. Most of the school facilities today were acquired and built during his term as headmaster. Williams left the school in the summer of 2006 after being convicted of kerb crawling.

Williams was succeeded by his deputy head Jo Manson who became the school's first female headteacher. She led the school into a continued "outstanding" OFSTED status and helped to acquire the school a second specialism in gifted and talented learning. After 10 years of leading the school Jo Manson retired in April 2016.

Jo Bull (another former deputy head) then took over from Jo Manson as headteacher, being officially appointed on 24 October 2017 and serving as interim headteacher until this time. After 18 months, Jo decided to resign and Mr Sukhjot Dhami took on the role as interim principal and was supported by Angelina Robin-Jones (executive principal of the academies trust).

In January 2020, Mr Mark Thorogood became the first permanent headteacher of the new Beacon Hill Academy, but he resigned in May 2020 after just 3 active months in the role making him the shortest serving headteacher/Principal in the schools history.

Sukhjot Dhami, who had been acting head twice before, returned to the role again as interim principal and guided the school through what was arguably its most challenging period, the COVID-19 pandemic. He took over permanently as principal in June 2020. Mr Dhami, who had been a history teacher at the school for 15 years, continues to serve as principal of the school today.

== Notable former pupils ==
- Lorely Burt, Baroness Burt of Solihull, Liberal Democrat politician (attended High Arcal 1966–1971)
- Chris Eaton (UK musician), singer-songwriter, a student at the school who returned to open the school's newly built music building in 1999
- Andrew Griffiths, Conservative politician
- Chris Wood, diplomat (attended High Arcal 1970–1977)
