= Chris Marsh =

English footballer

Personal information
- Full name: Christopher Marsh
- Date of birth: 14 January 1970 (age 56)
- Place of birth: Dudley, England
- Position: Defender

Senior career*
Years	Team	Apps	(Gls)
1988–2001	Walsall	394	(23)
2001	Wycombe Wanderers	12	(0)
2001–2003	Northampton Town	41	(0)
Total		447	(23)
- * Club domestic league appearances and goals

Christopher Marsh (born 14 January 1970) is an English former professional footballer best known for his time playing in the Football League for Walsall.

== Career ==
Marsh grew up in Sedgley and was a pupil at Queen Victoria Primary School and then Dormston School. He began his footballing career as a trainee with Walsall in 1986, joining the club on leaving school, and went on to make 479 appearances in fifteen seasons. He helped the club to promotion in 1988, 1995, 1999 and 2001. He played primarily as a fullback but, due to his versatility, played in virtually every position on the field for Walsall.

In January 2001, feeling that he had gone stale, he requested a transfer and joined Wycombe Wanderers in March 2001 for a transfer fee of £30,000. After only six months at Wycombe, he joined Northampton Town for a fee of £10,000 on a two-year contract, saying, "It has been a strange experience for me. I went to Wycombe last March but they have changed their system and I have been a victim of that. Lawrie Sanchez said he wanted me to stay but [Northampton manager] Kevin Wilson was a big factor in my decision." He made 43 appearances for Northampton in two seasons that were interrupted by an Achilles problem that ruled him out for over three months in 2002. After Northampton were relegated at the end of the 2002–03 season, he was released by the club and retired from the game.

Following an 18 year career as a professional footballer, Chris transitioned into coaching and business.

After retiring from playing, he became a restaurateur and owned and operated a sandwich shop.

He subsequently pursued coaching opportunities overseas, working in Australia and the United States.

He later joined Coventry City Football Club, where he held roles as Kitman and liaison manager.

He subsequently joined Manchester United, where he works in logistics and kit management, supporting the club’s football operations.

== Honours ==
Walsall

- Football League Third Division runner-up: 1994–95
- Football League Second Division runner-up: 1998–99
