= Bayton =

Village in Worcestershire, England

Coordinates: 52.356208°N 2.449694°W

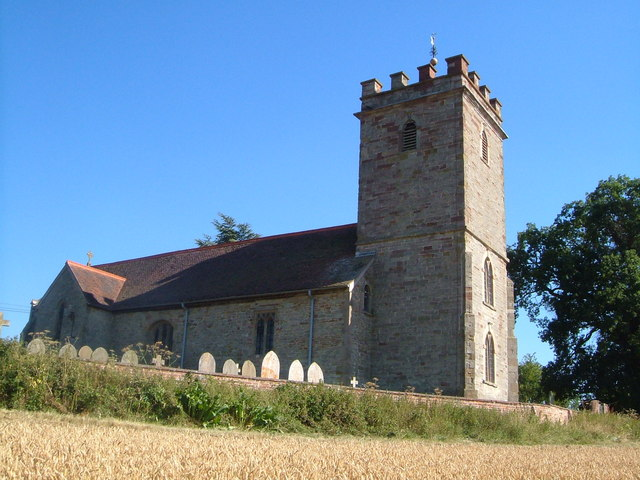

- Location within Worcestershire
- Population: 535
- OS grid reference: SO694732
  - London: 116 miles (187 km)
- Civil parish: Bayton
- District: Malvern Hills
- Shire county: Worcestershire
- Region: West Midlands
- Country: England
- Sovereign state: United Kingdom
- Post town: KIDDERMINSTER
- Postcode district: DY14
- Dialling code: 01299
- Police: West Mercia
- Fire: Hereford and Worcester
- Ambulance: West Midlands
- UK Parliament: West Worcestershire

Bayton is a village and civil parish in the Malvern Hills District of Worcestershire, England. According to the 2021 census it had a population of 535. The village is located 6 miles (10 km) west of Bewdley. The Village Hall was built and decorated following years of hard work and fund raising by dedicated local villagers. There is a church dedicated to St Bartholomew and within the Wyre Forest West group of parishes.

Bayton was in the lower division of Doddingtree Hundred.

The name Bayton derives from the Old English Beagetūn or Baegatūn, meaning 'Beage/Baega's settlement'.
