= Sedgley Urban District =

Former local government area in the UK

Coordinates: 52.54°N 2.12°W

Sedgley
- Population
  - 1911: 16,527
  - 1931: 19,262
  - 1961: 27,912
- History
  - Origin: Manor of Sedgley
  - Created: 1894
  - Abolished: 1966
  - Succeeded by: County Borough of Dudley; Metropolitan Borough of Dudley
- Status: Urban District
- Government: Sedgley Urban District Council
  - HQ: Sedgley

Sedgley urban district was a local government district within Staffordshire, which was created in 1894 from the western half of the manor of Sedgley (the other half of which became the Coseley Urban District).

The Urban District, formed in 1894, consisted of the historic villages of Sedgley, Cotwall End, Gospel End, Upper Gornal, Lower Gornal and Woodsetton.

The UDC built many new houses within its boundaries as the local population grew and the existing low quality housing was replaced. The first developments included the Beacon Hill Estate in Sedgley and smaller developments off Dudley Road in Upper Gornal and Summer Lane in Lower Gornal, which were built in the early 1920s. These developments were then expanded in the 1930s, 1940s and 1950s.

Post World War II developments included the Sedgley Hall Estate near Gospel End Road, the Bramford Estate at Woodsetton and a smaller development at Cinder Road in Gornal Wood. Flats (not in blocks more than four storeys high) and bungalows were also built in large numbers during this era. Interwar estates including the Beacon Estate were also expanded after 1945. The houses on the Sedgley Hall Estate were built from concrete panels just after the end of World War II, and are still standing eight decades later even though Sedgley UDC intended to replace them with brick-built housing by the 1960s.

By 1966, the district had developed into a town due to extensive housebuilding (private and council) since 1920, and was dissolved to be absorbed into three neighbouring authorities. The bulk of the district was absorbed into the expanded County Borough of Dudley, while the Gospel End area was absorbed into Seisdon Rural District (now South Staffordshire) and Goldthorn Park was absorbed into Wolverhampton. The introduction of post code districts locally in 1966 also means that much of Woodsetton now has a Dudley DY1 post code rather than Sedgley DY3, although Gospel End comes within the DY3 postal district – as do the villages of Himley and Swindon, which were never within the same local authority at Sedgley and are no longer even in the same county.

The Urban District Council also built many schools. Roberts Street Schools were built in Upper Gornal in 1894 – the year the Urban District Council was formed. Queen Victoria Schools were opened in Bilston Street in 1897. Dormston School, adjacent to Queen Victoria School, opened in 1935, replacing the former senior schools at Queen Victoria and Sedgley National Schools. Bramford Primary School in Woodsetton was built during the 1950s on the border with Coseley. Flax Hall Primary School in Upper Gornal was opened in 1950s and remained open until 1989.

Mass house building in the west of Sedgley during the 1950s and 1960s made it necessary for new primary schools to be built to accommodate Sedgley's rapidly growing population – Cotwall End infant and junior schools were opened in 1962 and on the nearby Northway Estate, Alder Coppice Infant and Junior Schools were opened in 1967, just after the UDC ceased to exist. High Arcal Grammar School was built in the Woodsetton area of Sedgley in 1961, while in the Lower Gornal area Ellowes Hall School opened in 1964 to replace the former senior schools at Robert Street and Red Hall. Sedgley UDC also had plans to build a new primary school to serve the new Straits Estate, and these became reality when Straits Primary School opened in 1968, by which time the UDC had been absorbed into an expanded County Borough of Dudley.

With the exception of Flax Hall, all of the schools built by Sedgley UDC remain in existence today, although Roberts Primary was replaced by a new building in 2001, and many of the other schools have been significantly expanded or partly rebuilt since their opening. Dormston School, for instance, had just one building (with capacity for around 500 pupils) on its opening, but by 2008 it had five classroom blocks (with capacity for well over 1,000 pupils) and also incorporated an arts and leisure complex. High Arcal's status changed from grammar to comprehensive in 1975, in the same year that Ellowes Hall and Dormston switched from secondary modern to comprehensive.

The 19th century buildings of Sedgley's only Roman Catholic school, St Chad's, were gradually replaced between 1957 and 1969.

The council offices were built on High Holborn in 1882, and after Sedgley UDC was disbanded were taken over by Dudley council, who used it as a Social Services department until 2000, ending 118 years of local authority use. It was sold to a private developer in 2002 and subsequently converted into flats.
