= DY postcode area =

Postcode area within the United Kingdom

Dudley
- Postcode area
- Coordinates: 52.453°N 2.181°W
- Country: United Kingdom
- Postcode area: DY
- Postcode area name: Dudley
- Post towns: 8
- Postcode districts: 14
- Postcode sectors: 59
- Postcodes (live): 10,962
- Postcodes (total): 14,419
- Statistics as at May 2020

The DY postcode area, also known as the Dudley postcode area, is a group of fourteen postcode districts in England, within eight post towns. These cover the south-western part of the West Midlands (including Dudley, Tipton, Brierley Hill, Stourbridge and Kingswinford) and north Worcestershire (including Kidderminster, Bewdley and Stourport-on-Severn), plus the south-westernmost part of Staffordshire and a small part of south-east Shropshire.

Mail for this area is sorted, along with mail for the adjacent WV postcode area, at the North West Midlands Mail Centre in Wolverhampton.

== Coverage ==
The approximate coverage of the postcode districts:

Postcode district	Post town	Coverage	Local authority area(s)
DY1	DUDLEY	Dudley, Woodsetton (part of)	Dudley
DY2	DUDLEY	Dudley town centre, Netherton, Woodside	Dudley
DY3	DUDLEY	Gornal, Himley, Sedgley, Swindon, Gospel End, Woodsetton (part of)	Dudley, South Staffordshire
DY4	TIPTON	Tipton, Coseley (part of), Tividale (part of) and Great Bridge	Sandwell, Dudley
DY5	BRIERLEY HILL	Brierley Hill (Merry Hill, Pensnett, Brockmoor, Gornal, Kingswinford (part of)), Amblecote (north and east of railway includes Peters Hill, Lakeside and Brompton Park), Quarry Bank (includes Caledonia Estate, High Street, Mount Pleasant and surrounding area to bottom of Bower Lane), Withymoor Village (including The Delph, Amblecote Road, Mill Street towards High Street of Brierley Hill)	Dudley
DY6	KINGSWINFORD	Kingswinford, Ashwood, Wall Heath	Dudley, South Staffordshire
DY7	STOURBRIDGE	Enville, Kinver, Stourton	South Staffordshire
DY8	STOURBRIDGE	Stourbridge town centre, Amblecote, Hagley (part of), Wollaston, Wordsley	Dudley, Bromsgrove, South Staffordshire
DY9	STOURBRIDGE	Hagley (part of), Lye, Pedmore, Broome, Drayton	Bromsgrove, Dudley, Wyre Forest
DY10	KIDDERMINSTER	Kidderminster (east), Chaddesley Corbett, Blakedown, Wolverley, Cookley	Wyre Forest, Wychavon
DY11	KIDDERMINSTER	Kidderminster (west), Hartlebury, Wolverley	Wyre Forest, Wychavon
DY12	BEWDLEY	Bewdley, Arley, Kinlet	Wyre Forest, Shropshire
DY13	STOURPORT-ON-SEVERN	Stourport-on-Severn, Areley Kings, Astley, Dunley, Crossway Green, Dunhampton	Wyre Forest, Malvern Hills, Wychavon
DY14	KIDDERMINSTER	Cleobury Mortimer, Rock, Far Forest, Bayton, Mamble	Shropshire, Wyre Forest, Malvern Hills

== Map ==
DY postcode area map, showing postcode districts in red and post towns in grey text, with links to nearby B, SY, WR, WS and WV postcode areas.

== See also ==
- List of postcode areas in the United Kingdom
- Postcode Address File
