= Alder Coppice =

Nature reserve in the West Midlands, England

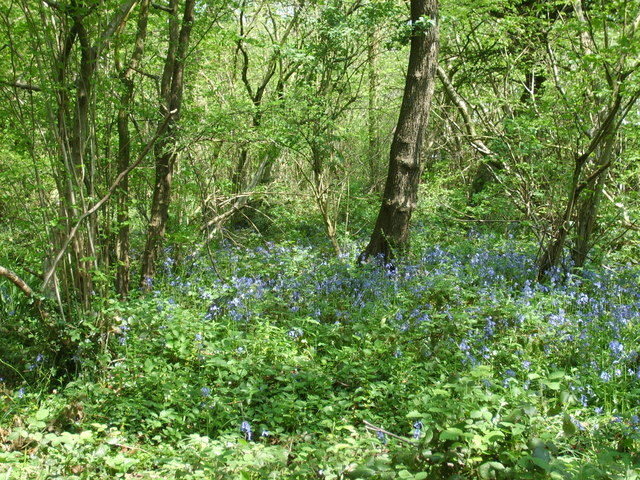
- Bluebells in Alder Coppice

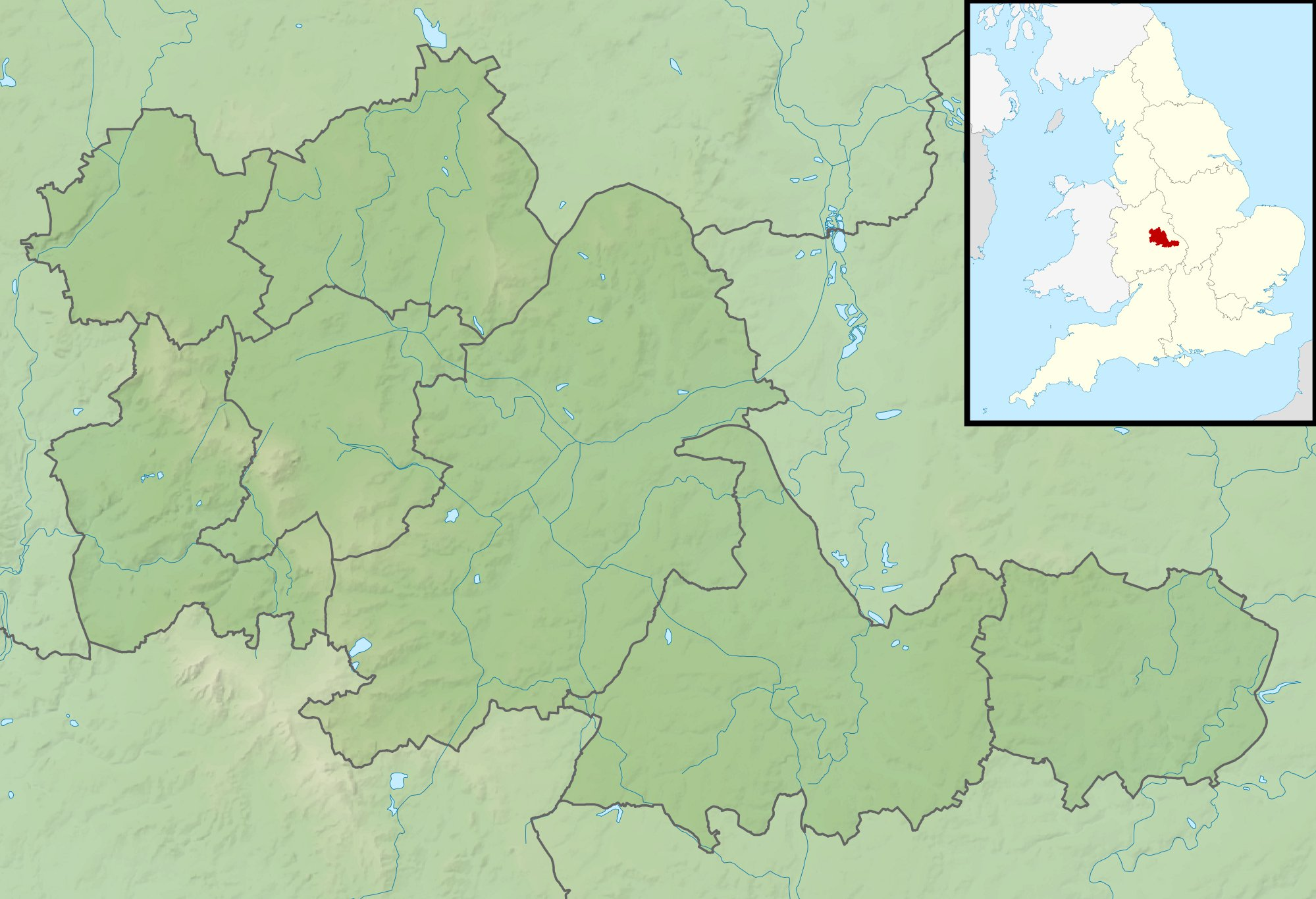
- Location within West Midlands county
- Interactive map of Alder Coppice
- Location: near Sedgley
- OS grid: SO 912 947
- Coordinates: 52°33′3″N 2°7′54″W
- Area: 25 acres (10 ha)
- Designation: Local nature reserve

Alder Coppice is a local nature reserve in West Midlands, England. It is near Sedgley, next to the Northway Estate, in the Metropolitan Borough of Dudley.

== Description ==
It is an ancient woodland, area 25 acres (10 ha), maintained by Dudley Metropolitan Borough Council. It was designated a local nature reserve in November 2019.

There are pathways through the wood, including three waymarked pathways of differing lengths. There are tree-stump seats around the wood. Birds can be seen including woodpeckers; flowers to be seen when in season include displays of bluebells, and wild garlic.

A feature is the "Conversation Crescent", funded by Age UK Dudley: this is a crescent of benches, arranged to allow visitors to easily see and speak to one another or to enjoy space and solitude if they prefer; to encourage conversation but not demand it.
