= Straits Estate =

Housing estate in the West Midlands, England

Coordinates: 52.526°N 2.145°W

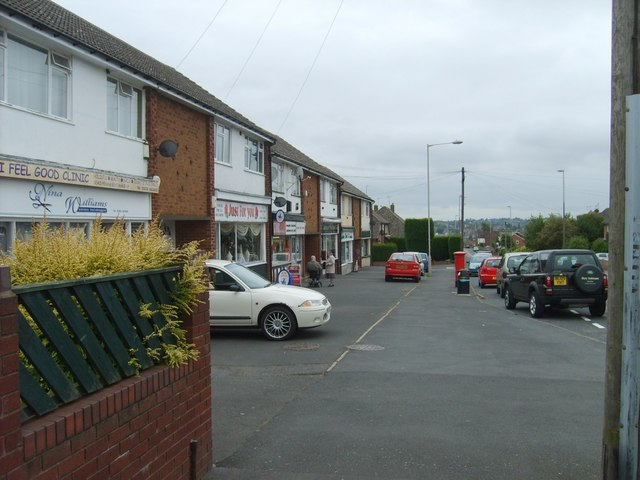
Post office and shops

Straits Estate is a housing estate located in Gornal, West Midlands, and was built for homeowners during the late 1950s and early 1960s. The streets within the estate are all named after famous poets and wordsmiths. It is served by Diamond Bus service 27/27A which runs between Wolverhampton and Dudley.

It was originally known as the Conqueror's Farm housing estate after a farm which had been situated in the local area, but the Straits name was adopted by the local community soon afterwards as it was situated around The Straits, a main through route along which several shops to serve the new estate were built.

The estate was constructed around a large residence called The Straits House, which was built during the 1830s. It had once been occupied by a succession of affluent local people, but by the time the surrounding estate was completed, it had been converted into a public house. This pub was the centre of most activities in the estate, with fairs, and fetes on the car park and grounds. It opened as a pub in 1960, when the new housing estate was being built. However, due to being depreciated by the brewery, it was closed in 2006. Despite Dudley Metropolitan Borough Council declining the planning application multiple times, it has since been converted into flats.

In 2002, there was an earthquake in Dudley, with its epicentre being located at the junction of High Arcal Road and Himley Road (just of the border of the Straits Estate).
