= Gornal, West Midlands =

Village in Dudley, England

Coordinates: 52.523°N 2.124°W

Gornal
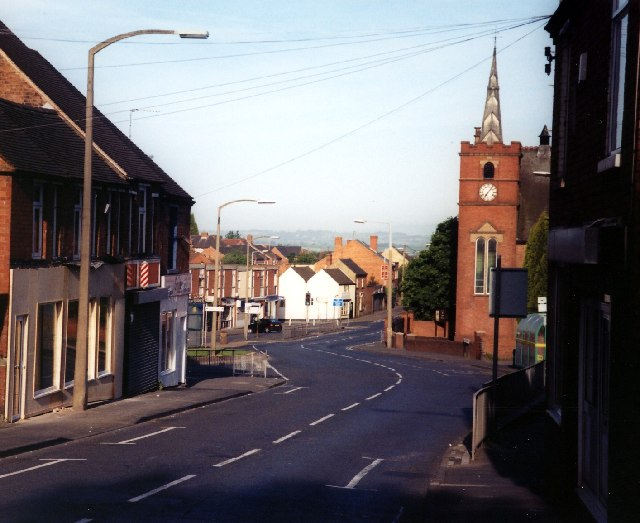
- The village of Gornal Wood

- Location within the West Midlands
- Population: 12,992 (ward) (Note: Population figure of Gornal ward excludes the village of Upper Gornal; population of Upper Gornal and Woodsetton ward is 13,793.)
- OS grid reference: SO915917
- Metropolitan borough: Dudley
- Metropolitan county: West Midlands
- Region: West Midlands
- Country: England
- Sovereign state: United Kingdom
- Post town: Dudley
- Postcode district: DY3
- Dialling code: 01902 01384
- Police: West Midlands
- Fire: West Midlands
- Ambulance: West Midlands
- UK Parliament: Dudley North

Gornal is a village and electoral ward (Note: The village of Upper Gornal is not located in the Gornal wood, rather it is located in the Upper Gornal and Woodsetton ward) in Dudley Metropolitan Borough, in the West Midlands of England. It encompasses the three historical villages of Upper Gornal, Lower Gornal, and Gornal Wood. Gornal was historically part of Staffordshire until the creation of the West Midlands County in 1974. Gornal is 11 miles (18 km) from Birmingham.

The three Gornal villages were originally a part of the ancient manor of Sedgley until 1894, when the area became part of Sedgley Urban District. In 1966, along with most of the rest of Sedgley, it was merged into the County Borough of Dudley. Since 1974, it has been part of the larger Metropolitan Borough of Dudley.

Gornal stone, a variety of limestone, originates in Gornal.

Himley Hall and Park and Baggeridge Country Park are notable nearby visitor attractions.

== Areas ==
=== Upper Gornal ===
Situated south of Sedgley on the main A459 road, the area has undergone extensive private and council housing development since the 1920s. It was the target of three bombs by the German Luftwaffe during World War II, though no buildings were damaged and there were no civilian casualties.

Upper Gornal formerly had a small cinema, the Jack Darby Picture House, from the early 20th century, but it closed in 1960 due to competition from other nearby theatres. The building now houses a small hardware store. Also of note, the local landmark Pig on the Wall public house was controversially demolished in 2002 to make way for a McDonald's restaurant. Another landmark was The Green Dragon public house which is now an Indian restaurant.

=== Lower Gornal ===
Lower Gornal is located southwest of Upper Gornal, and includes the three schools in the local area – Roberts Primary, Red Hall Primary, and Ellowes Hall Sports College. First built in 1894, the original building of Roberts Primary School was demolished in 2000 following the completion of a new £6 million building. Red Hall was formed around 1900 as an infant, junior and secondary school; but the secondary school closed in 1964 when Ellowes Hall opened. Ellowes Hall itself was named after the Ellowes Hall House that previously stood on the site, prior to its demolition in 1964.

Gornal Athletic F.C., a football team currently in the Premier Division of the West Midlands (Regional) League, are based in Lower Gornal.

==== The local legend – 'Pig on the wall' ====
One, not entirely apocryphal, episode from Lower Gornal's past occurred when Enoch and Eli (Aynuk and Ayli in the local dialect – the two fictional characters to which local jokes are usually attributed) "put the pig on the wall to watch the band go by". Local legend has it, that once, a military band marched through the suburb, and caused such great excitement amongst the residents, that not only did many people flock to see it, but one person even put his pig on the wall to afford the animal a better view. This phrase has long been part of the local idiolect, but its origins still remain obscure. There was even a hotel in the Upper Gornal area of the town called the "Pig on the Wall". It was originally called the Bricklayer's Arms and known locally as Hammond's after the long time owners, but took up its new name in 1985. It was however demolished and replaced with a McDonald's restaurant in late 2002.

=== Gornal Wood ===
Gornal Wood is on the western boundary of the Dudley Metropolitan Borough, and contains a small shopping area, including a library. It is the site of the Crooked House pub, a famous landmark known because of its distinctive appearance as a result of mining subsidence. The pub was closed in 2023 and later sold. In early August 2023 a fire left the building in ruins and was controversially demolished.

Gornal Wood Crematorium and Cemetery is also in this area, having opened in 1960.

The X10 bus route operated by National Express running from Birmingham city centre terminates here. Other services are the 223, 27/27a and 17 operated by Diamond Bus.

== Notable events ==
=== 2002 earthquake ===
The epicentre of the 2002 Dudley earthquake was located in Gornal Wood. It measured 4.8 on the Richter magnitude scale and could be felt as far away as North Yorkshire.

== Notable residents ==
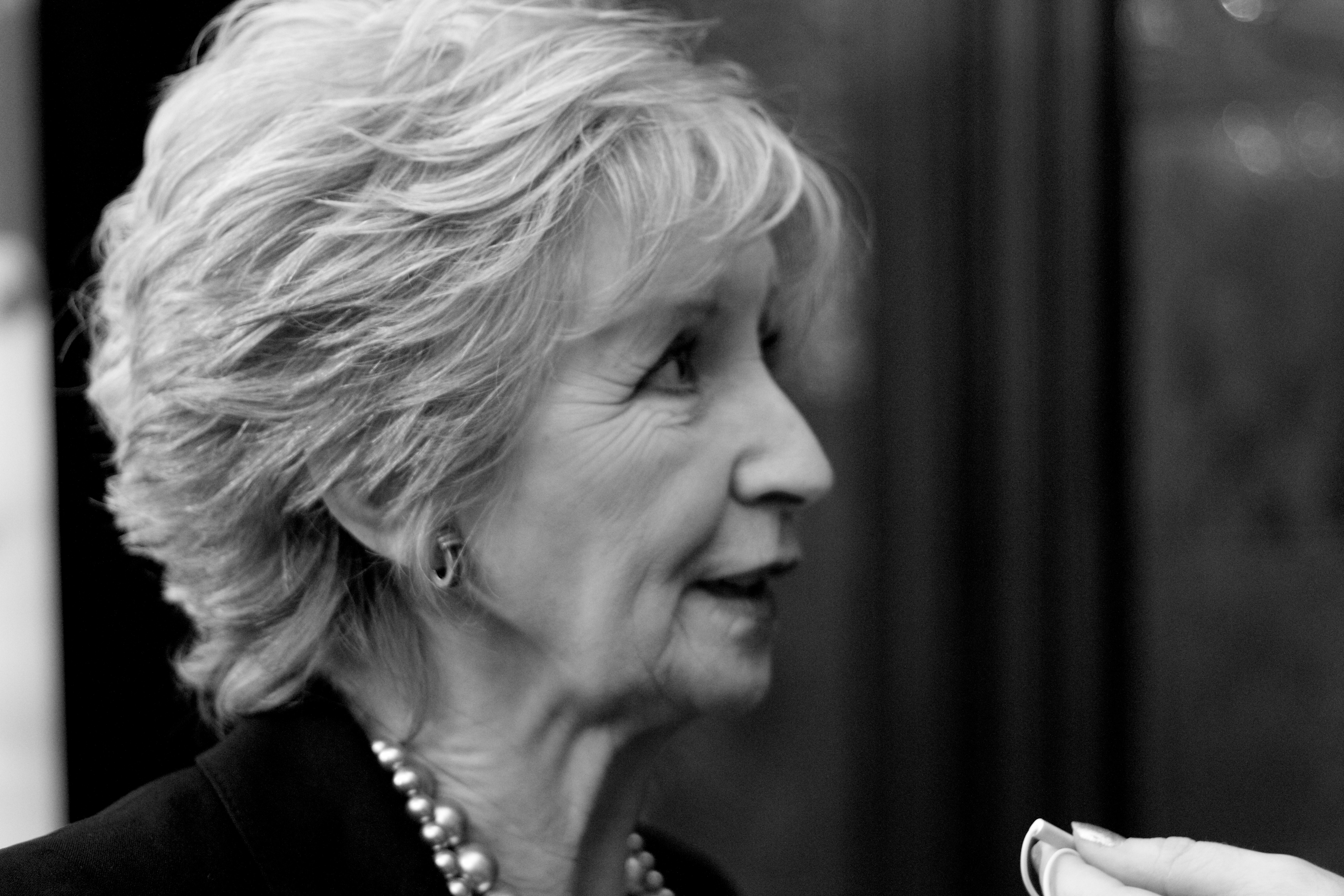
Sue Lawley, 2013

- Chris Evans (1841 in Upper Gornal – 1924) was a British-born American labor union leader.
- Sue Lawley (born 1946 in Sedgley) former BBC newsreader, grew up in Lower Gornal.

=== Sport ===
- Willie Layton (1875 in Gornall – 1944), footballer who played 331 games for Sheffield Wednesday F.C.
- Arthur Marsh (1947 in Lower Gornall – 2020) footballer who played 186 games, mainly for Rochdale A.F.C.

== See also ==
- List of areas in Dudley
- Straits Estate
