= Dunhampton =

Village in Worcestershire, England

Coordinates: 52.298°N 2.228°W

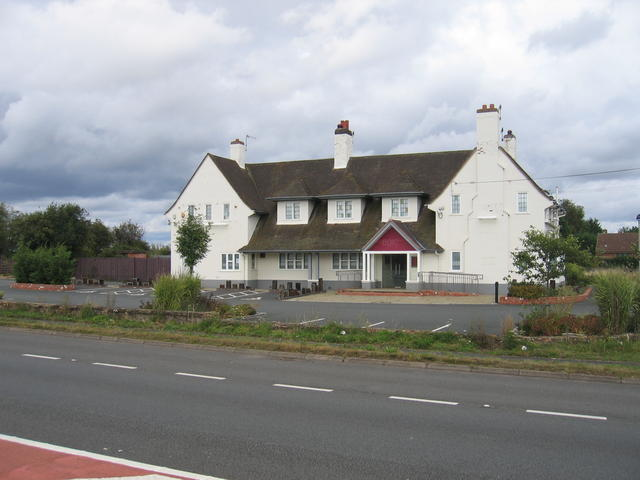
- Closed pub

- Location within Worcestershire
- District: Wychavon
- Shire county: Worcestershire
- Region: West Midlands
- Country: England
- Sovereign state: United Kingdom
- Post town: STOURPORT-ON-SEVERN
- Postcode district: DY13
- Police: West Mercia
- Fire: Hereford and Worcester
- Ambulance: West Midlands

Dunhampton is a village in Worcestershire, England.
