= Woodsetton, Dudley =

Coordinates: 52.533°N 2.095°W

Woodsetton
- Location within the West Midlands
- Population: 13,793 (2011.Ward.Upper Gornal and Woodsetton)
- OS grid reference: SO9392
- Metropolitan borough: Dudley
- Metropolitan county: West Midlands
- Region: West Midlands
- Country: England
- Sovereign state: United Kingdom
- Post town: DUDLEY
- Postcode district: DY1, DY3
- Dialling code: 01902
- Police: West Midlands
- Fire: West Midlands
- Ambulance: West Midlands
- UK Parliament: Dudley North

Woodsetton is an area of the Dudley Metropolitan Borough in the West Midlands of England, roughly 2.0 miles (3 km) northwest of Dudley Town Centre. Formerly in the Sedgley Urban District, a part of Woodsetton (which included Dudley Castle) was transferred into the Dudley County Borough in 1926 to allow for the building of the Priory Estate. This reorganisation also saw this part of the area transferred from Staffordshire to Worcestershire.

The remainder of the urban district was transferred into an expanded Dudley borough in 1966. Modern-day Woodsetton now forms part of the electoral ward of Upper Gornal and Woodsetton. It is divided between the DY1 and DY3 postal districts.

Of historical significance, Woodsetton is the birthplace of industrial pioneer Abraham Darby, who developed the process of smelting iron ore using coke.

The main road through Woodsetton is the non-primary A457 running between Sedgley and Birmingham. Woodsetton is served by bus routes 81 and 229 connecting the area to Wolverhampton, Sedgley, Dudley and Bilston on a daily basis.

Holden's Brewery, founded in 1915 by Edwin Holden, is based in Woodsetton on a site in George Street adjoining one of its pubs, the Park Inn.

Woodsetton was struck by an F1/T2 tornado on 23 November 1981, as part of the record-breaking nationwide tornado outbreak on that day. The tornado later moved over Dudley town centre, causing moderate damage.

== Education ==
The Bramford Primary School, which opened in the 1950s, provides primary education for the Woodsetton area. The school was expanded in 2004 to include a new sports hall and several classrooms. For secondary education, the area is served by Beacon Hill Academy, just east of Sedgley.

Woodsetton is also the location of the Woodsetton School, a special school catered to primary-aged children with learning difficulties.
