= Coseley Urban District =

Local government district in Staffordshire, England

Coordinates: 52.544°N 2.103°W

Coseley
- Population
  - 1911: 22,834
  - 1931: 25,137
  - 1961: 39,535
- History
  - Origin: Manor of Sedgley
  - Created: 1894
  - Abolished: 1966
  - Succeeded by: County Borough of Dudley; Metropolitan Borough of Dudley
- Status: Urban District
- Government: Urban District Council
  - HQ: Coseley
  - Motto: 'Fellowship is life'
- Arms of the Coseley Urban District Council

Coseley Urban District was a local government district in Staffordshire which was created in 1894.

It was made up of the villages of Brierley (now Bradley), Ettingshall and Coseley, which had previously been part of the ancient manor of Sedgley - the western section of which formed Sedgley Urban District.

The urban district council was based at a building in the town centre. It began building houses in the 1920s to replace sub standard older housing and by 1962 had built over 2,000 properties, mostly houses but also flats and bungalows. The largest developments were at Woodcross and Lanesfield on new housing estate, while large sections of the Wallbrook, Princes End and Hurst Hill areas were redeveloped with new housing during the 1950s and 1960s.

Coseley urban district ceased to exist in 1966 when, under recommendations of the Local Government Commission for England, it was divided between the County Boroughs of Dudley, Wolverhampton and West Bromwich. Most of the historic Ettingshall village was placed in Wolverhampton, while Brierley was roughly half split between Wolverhampton and West Bromwich, and the main Coseley area became part of Dudley. In 1974, these became part of the newly created West Midlands metropolitan county

The former Coseley Urban District Council offices became redundant with the abolition of the local authority, and were demolished soon afterwards.
