= Ellowes Hall Sports College =

Location
- Stickley Lane; Lower Gornal, Dudley, West Midlands, DY3 2JH; England; 52°31′33″N 2°07′47″W

Information
- Type: Academy
- Motto: Side Before self every time
- Religious affiliation: ALAW
- Established: 1966
- Department for Education URN: 141570 Tables
- Ofsted: Reports
- Chair: Vacant
- Headteacher: Kevin Rogers
- Gender: Coeducational
- Age: 11 to 18
- Enrolment: c. 1000
- Colour: Dark Navy Blue
- Website: http://www.elloweshall.co.uk

Ellowes Hall Sports College (formerly Ellowes Hall School) is a comprehensive secondary school situated on Stickley Lane in Lower Gornal, Dudley, West Midlands, England.

It provides education for pupils aged 11 to 18 years.

== History ==
It was built as a secondary modern school Sedgley Urban District Council near the Ellowes Hall stately home (which was demolished in 1964), to replace a smaller secondary school at nearby Redhall, but since its opening in 1966, has existed within the Metropolitan Borough of Dudley.

In September 1972, the age of pupils starting the school was increased to 12 in order to comply with the LEA's decision to increase the secondary school starting age.

In September 1975, the school's status changed to comprehensive and a sixth form was added, making it a 12–18 school.

However, the school was reorganised to an 11–16 comprehensive in September 1990 as most of the remaining sixth forms in the Dudley borough were replaced with expanded facilities at further education colleges.

In September 1993, the school became grant-maintained, only to return to Dudley LEA's control in 1998. By this date, a new classroom block and library had been constructed, and the main hall had been refurbished. A performing arts block was opened in 1999.

Just after the school became grant maintained, the governors seized the opportunity to restore sixth form facilities to the school and the new sixth form opened in September 1995.

In 2004, the school gained specialist sports status.

In 2008, Ellowes became the highest ranking of the three Sedgley secondary schools in GCSE examinations for the first time when 63% of pupils finished their compulsory education with five or more grades at C or above including English and Mathematics. This placed Ellowes as the fifth highest of the Dudley Borough's 21 secondary schools. In 2010, 90% of students gained five or more grades at C and above with 66% including English and Mathematics.

Previously a foundation school administered by Dudley Metropolitan Borough Council, Ellowes Hall Sports College converted to academy status in March 2015. However the school continues to co-ordinate with Dudley Metropolitan Borough Council for admissions.

== Location ==
The school serves the villages of Lower Gornal and Gornal Wood, where the majority of the school's pupils live. A lesser number of pupils are from the Upper Gornal area, while some are from over the border in Dudley on the Milking Bank housing estate that was mostly developed during the 1980s.

Ellowes Hall is located on the Stickley Estate, which is predominantly made up of pre-war council housing built by Sedgley UDC, though many homes have been bought off the council under the right to buy scheme. The estate is situated just to the north-west of Lower Gornal village centre, and is approximately two miles from the centres of nearby towns Sedgley and Dudley.

The majority of pupils starting at Ellowes are former pupils of Roberts Primary School, Redhall Primary School, Straits Primary School and Milking Bank Primary School, though a handful of pupils have been taken in from schools including Cotwall End Primary School and – until its closure in 2006 – Sycamore Green Primary School.

== Ofsted ==
In 2019 Ofsted graded the school as 'Requires Improvement', following a period of decline under school leaders, lack of challenge from school governors and lack of impact of the support offered by the trust. As of 2025, the school's most recent judgement was Good, following inspection in 2023.

== Invictus Education Trust ==
The "Invictus Education Trust" is the academy to which Ellowes Hall, Leasowes High School, Ounsdale High School, The Crestwood School and Kinver High School belong.

== Drama productions ==
The school produces plays, such as Fiddler on the Roof, Miss Saigon, Billy Elliot, Oliver!, The Sound of Music, Les Misérables, and most recently The Phantom of the Opera (1986 musical).

Drama productions take place in the performing arts suite, which was built in 1999 at a cost of £200,000.
