= Dormston School =

The Dormston School

Location
- Mill Bank, Sedgley; Dudley, West Midlands, DY3 1SN; England

Information
- Type: Community school
- Established: 1935
- Local authority: Dudley
- Department for Education URN: 103855 Tables
- Ofsted: Reports
- Head teacher: Caroline Sutton
- Gender: Coeducational
- Age range: 11–16
- Enrolment: 1137
- Capacity: 1120
- Website: School website

Dormston School is a coeducational secondary school in Sedgley, West Midlands, England.

As of 2020, the school has approximately 1,100 pupils aged 11 to 16 on the roll, and approximately 80 permanent members of staff (including non-teaching staff). In September 2016 some pupils of The Coseley School, which had closed, transferred to Dormston School.

== History ==
Dormston School first opened in 1935 as two secondary modern schools for boys and girls. The original site consisted of a single two-storey building that contained 19 classrooms as well as a dining hall, gymnasium, assembly hall and library.

By the 1970s, the two schools had merged to form a mixed school. New buildings had been added for the teaching of Science, Technology and Art, and to reflect the growing population of Sedgley and the growing need for school places, as well as the borough-wide switch to comprehensive education which took place across the new Metropolitan Borough of Dudley from September 1975. The school was built by Sedgley Urban District council, but since 1966 has existed within the Borough of Dudley

A fourth classroom block, housing music, drama, dance and English classrooms (D Block) was built during the 1990/91 academic year, followed shortly afterwards by three Modern Languages classrooms, two Art Rooms and a Technology workshop. The early 1990s expansions took place to accommodate the extra pupils following the local authority's decision to lower the secondary school starting age from 12 to 11, as well as growing demand for places at the school. It had provided capacity for around 700 pupils when it covered the 12-16 age range. That figure had risen to around 900 when the age for admissions was reduced, but high demand for places saw it increased beyond 1,000 by the mid 1990s.

The Dormston Centre was first planned in the late 1980s, and in July 1996 the National Lottery granted the Dormston School £4 million to build the complex, which was completed nearly four years later, named 'The Dormston Centre'. It incorporates facilities including a sports hall, art gallery, theatre and cafe. It cost around £6million to build in total. The official opening took place on 1 December 2000. Two years later, the Dudley News criticised the project as a "failure" as few people in the local area were making use of it.

In March 1999, the school made the headlines when 41 girls were either sent home, made to change their clothes or isolated from lessons for wearing excessively short skirts, following months of complaints from the local community. 21 female pupils aged from 11 to 16 were suspended and the others segregated away from the other pupils. This attracted national as well as local media attention.

In the autumn of 2000, Dormston School was credited with the Charter Mark in recognition of its services to the pupils and the local community. The school was also awarded specialist status as a Mathematics and Computing College in July 2006.

Two science laboratories were opened in the autumn of 2003, as was a Sixth Form Centre (owned by Dudley College) in September 1996. The sixth form block was demolished in 2007 and transferred to the mobile classrooms which had been erected more than a decade earlier. These were removed by 2015. The sixth form facilities were relocated to the new Dudley Sixth building in Dudley town centre in September 2012.

An additional block was completed in 2017 to accommodate a further five classrooms (Block F). This was to accommodate a fresh increase in pupil numbers following the closure of the Coseley School, where the remaining pupils were divided between Dormston and High Arcal.

The school's current head teacher is Mrs Caroline Sutton, who was appointed in September 2022 following the retirement of Mr Stephen Dixon.

=== Headteachers (Since 1983) ===
- Barbara O'Connor - Head Teacher from September 1983 to December 2000.
- Stephanie Sherwood - Head Teacher from January 2001 to July 2013.
- Ben Stitchman - Head Teacher from September 2013 to July 2018.
- Stephen Dixon - Head Teacher from September 2018 to July 2022.
- Caroline Sutton - Head Teacher since September 2022.

== Notable former pupils ==
- Mark Briggs - former West Bromwich Albion, Notts County and Shrewsbury Town footballer, attended from 1993 to 1998
- Reece Brown - footballer who plays for Huddersfield Town and formerly played for clubs including Birmingham City, attended from 2007 to 2012
- Chris Marsh - former Walsall defender, attended from 1982 to 1986.
- Phil Parkes - former West Ham goalkeeper, attended from 1961 to 1965.
