= Priory Estate =

Housing estate in Dudley, England

Coordinates: 52°31′20″N 2°5′16″W

The Priory Estate is a housing estate in Dudley, West Midlands, England, which has largely been developed since 1929.

== History ==
The Priory Estate is so named because it is located near the Priory ruins and Priory Park. It stands on the land which once straddled the border of Dudley County Borough and Sedgley Urban District, which were in the counties of Worcestershire and Staffordshire respectively.

The borders were moved back several hundred yards in 1926 when Dudley Council purchased the land with a view to building council houses to rehouse more than 2,000 families from town centre slums. Hundreds of council houses had already been built across the Dudley Borough in the last decade, but the Priory Estate was to be the largest council housing development yet in the area as the town's slum problem was still far from being solved.

The boundary changes also meant that Dudley Castle was finally transferred to the borough of Dudley after centuries in Sedgley.

The foundation stone of the very first house, 9 Oak Road, was laid on 16 July 1929.

The first houses were occupied in 1930 and by the end of the decade more than 2,000 houses had been built on the Priory and Wren's Nest estates. There were also private houses for owner-occupiers built mostly on the south side of the estate near Priory Park, around the southern section of Priory Road, Hazel Road, Woodland Avenue, Chesnut Avenue, Somery Road, Forest Road, Paganel Drive and Gervase Drive. The Broadway, a new link road from Dudley town centre to Sedgley, was also laid out to include more than 200 private houses.

Three public houses served the estate: the Wren's Nest in Priory Road (built in the mid-1930s), the King Arthur on the corner of Birmingham New Road and Priory Road (built in 1939) and the Caves in Wrens Hill Road (built in the 1950s). However, the Wren's Nest (which was renamed the Duncan Edwards in 2001) was closed in late 2005 and was demolished a year later following a serious arson attack. The King Arthur closed in 2011 and after demolition following an arson attack, the building stood empty until Aldi opened on the site in 2016. The Caves is now the only remaining pub in the area.

Shops were built on the estate, mostly in Priory Road, with smaller shops being erected in Lilac Road and Thornhill Road. However, the Lilac Road shops were converted into houses in the late 2000s, and the Thornhill Road shop was demolished in the 2009 as part of the North Priory redevelopment.

Priory Park was laid out in 1932, with iron railing around the perimeter.(These were removed during the war for the metal to be used in the war effort.) The same year that Priory Road was fully opened to give Dudley a direct road link with the Birmingham New Road in Coseley – incorporating the Priory Ruins as well as Priory Hall (former home of Sir Gilbert Claughton). Priory Hall is currently in use as Dudley Registry Office, and has been based there since the office's relocation from a building in Ednam Road in about 1990. The Park itself was restored between 2012 and 2013 through support from Dudley Council, Heritage Lottery Fund and Big Lottery Fund.

Most of the people living in the council houses on the Priory Estate were rehoused from town centre slum clearances. They were generally pleased with living in new houses which had gardens, electricity, hot and cold running tap water, bathrooms, toilets, a solid fuel boiler, with kitchens and an adjacent pantry.

But the Priory Estate quickly ran into problems, with vandalism, litter, graffiti, vehicle crime, burglary and drug dealing becoming widespread, particularly on the north side of the estate, by the 1980s. Unemployment in the area was also relatively high. However, the Priory Estate was not as severely affected by these issues as the neighbouring Wren's Nest, or indeed several other parts of the Dudley borough and neighbouring Sandwell.

The homes of elderly people were targeted most frequently by vandals and other criminals; in 1991, a plank of wood was hurled through the window of a room in which a 90-year-old woman was sleeping.

The most famous former resident of the Priory Estate is footballer Duncan Edwards, who was born two miles away at Holly Hall but moved to 31 Elm Road as a small child, attending Priory Primary School (1941 to 1948) and then Wolverhampton Street School. Edwards went on to play 18 times for England as well as winning two Football League championships with Manchester United, before he died in 1958 at the age of 21 from injuries sustained in the Munich air disaster. After his death, a stained glass window was dedicated to Edwards at St Francis' Parish Church at the junction of Laurel Road and Poplar Crescent. The church was founded in 1931 and was originally based at Priory Hall before the church building on the newly developed housing estate was opened on 10 May 1932.

The estate was served by a secondary school from 1965, when Mons Hill School opened on Wrens Hill Road (running between the Priory and the neighbouring Wren's Nest Estate) to replace Wolverhampton Street School. This school closed in 1990 due to falling pupil numbers, with the remaining pupils split between Castle High and Coseley School. The Mons Hill buildings then became part of Dudley College, which vacated most of the site in 2012. The redundant buildings were demolished in 2015. Dudley College vacated the remaining part of the site in 2018 and this building was reutilised as The Wenlock School.

== Priory Primary School ==
Priory Primary School

Location
- Limes Road; Dudley, West Midlands, DY1 4AQ; England

Information
- Type: Community primary
- Motto: Believe in yourself
- Established: 1932
- Local authority: Dudley
- Department for Education URN: 103831 Tables
- Ofsted: Reports
- Headteacher: Mrs Craig
- Gender: Coeducational
- Age: 3 to 11
- Enrolment: 520
- Website: http://www.priory.dudley.sch.uk

Priory Primary School is a primary school located on the Priory Estate in Dudley, West Midlands, England. It includes a nursery unit, and is open to pupils aged from 3 to 11 years.

It was opened on 1 October 1930 as a temporary 5-7 infant school in Priory Hall, relocating on 19 October 1932 to the permanent site on Limes Road, to serve the surrounding Priory Estate, which was in the early stages of development at this time. Lady Astor opened a nursery unit in a corrugated iron building on the site on 8 March 1938, the first of its kind in the Dudley area, with most local schools not following suit until the 1970s and some still lacking such facilities to this day. The junior school, opened later in 1938, was the final phase. By now, the Priory Estate was largely complete.

In September 1972, the infant school became a 5-8 first school and the junior school became an 8-12 middle school. The two schools merged to form a single primary school in September 1985, with the first and middle departments reverting to infant and junior from September 1990 when the secondary transfer age was reverted to 11.

The nursery unit was replaced in the early 1990s and the old building demolished to make way for a development of new private starter homes. The current nursery building also incorporates a children's centre.

Former pupils at the school published a book during the summer of 2000 to commemorate the school's anniversary, with former pupils and staff sharing their memories and photographs of the school as well as their memories of life on the Priory Estate.

== North Priory redevelopment ==
On 2 March 2006 a consultation firm employed by Dudley Metropolitan Borough Council recommended the demolition of between 40 and 100 per cent of 260 homes on the northern part of the estate. The consultation firm had studied four scenarios. The first had been refurbishment of all the existing properties, many of which were currently in disrepair as well as being unsuitable for elderly and disabled occupants. But this scenario would not alter the estate's "isolated" position, highlighted by just two out of the six road links to the estate being accessible for vehicles. Nor would it make any difference to the narrow roads in the estate, one of which is now one-way. The second option had been 20% redevelopment along Pine Road, which would include refurbishment of the remaining properties but no major alterations to the road layout. The third option had been 40% redevelopment, which would have seen the demolition of all homes in Pine Road and Berry Road, as well as some in Thornhill Road. The fourth and final option was total redevelopment.

The planned demolition was deemed necessary as most of the houses in this area were in a poor state of repair, with the council finding it increasingly difficult to let the properties and being faced with a high demand for moves away from the area from existing tenants. The environment has been plagued by vandalism, arson attacks, litter and graffiti. The report also criticised the "isolated" layout of the estate, which was accessible from six points but only two of those points are accessible by motor vehicles. Most of the roads on the estate are relatively narrow (including one which is one-way) compared to roads on other parts of the Priory, which was less of a problem when the area was first developed – as virtually none of the local residents owned a car when the estate was built during the 1930s. The rising level of car ownership since the houses were built had led to many local residents parking their cars on pavements and even gardens, mainly due to the narrow streets.

The council voted for a total redevelopment of the estate on 4 December 2006, and rehousing of tenants began in early 2007, with a view to completing the rehousing within 18 months and demolition work starting before the end of 2008. As the rehousing gathered pace throughout 2007 and 2008, empty properties on the estate were regularly targeted by vandals and arsonists, as were a number of vehicles parked in the area.

However, six families remained on the estate by January 2009 and the last tenant did not leave until May 2009, a month after demolition work started. The final buildings were demolished in October 2009 and work on the estate began 12 months later, being completed by 2014. The redeveloped estate, which includes a mix of private and public sector housing, has a completely redesigned road layout and new street names.

Fears were rife in the local community that other parts of the Priory Estate would be demolished once the North Priory redevelopment was completed, but the local council has instead opted to improve the older properties on the estate.

== Crime ==
The Priory Estate has traditionally had a very high crime rate.

In October 2003, arsonists set fire to a pigeon loft in the garden of a house in Linwood Road and killed nine pigeons. On another part of the estate, anti-social behaviour was creating so much trouble that one family gave an interview to the Express and Star regional newspaper openly criticising the local council for failing to respond to their demands for a transfer.

In March 2004, Dudley Register Office (located in Priory Park) was set alight by arsonists. It took 100 firefighters a whole night to defeat the blaze.

Also in March 2004, a 90-year-old widow on the Estate criticised a judge for failing to hand out a prison sentence to the heroin addict and career criminal who broke into her house and stole £80 from her purse.

In April 2006, an arson attack caused severe damage to the Duncan Edwards public house in Priory Road. The pub had been refurbished just five years earlier and renamed in honour of Duncan Edwards, but had been closed a short time earlier in spite of its popularity in the local community. The building has since been demolished and plans have already been unveiled for the site to be developed for housing and retail, but construction work has yet to start.

The rehousing of North Priory residents in preparation for demolition resulted in empty properties being scoured by scrap metal dealers in the hope of finding items of value, despite council workers having already stripped these properties of tanks and copper piping. Most of the empty properties were vandalised in some way, while several were damaged in arson attacks and at least two residents had their cars damaged in arson attacks on neighbouring properties which had already been vacated. The estate also became a popular destination for fly tippers and joyriders dumping stolen cars in the run up to its demolition.

== The BNP ==
On 1 May 2003, the British National Party gained one its first councillors, when Simon Darby was elected to the Castle and Priory ward (which includes the Priory Estate) in the council elections. The area had previously been represented by three Labour Party councillors.

Darby had gained 26.2% of the vote in Castle and Priory a year earlier, and on being elected he obtained almost half of the votes cast.

In 2003, Castle and Priory was the most deprived ward in the whole Dudley borough, and among the 7% most deprived wards in England.

Many local people also saw the BNP as the answer to the Priory Estate's many social problems. House repairs weren't being carried out efficiently, the local youth centre was rarely open and the estate office had closed leaving residents without cars to travel a long distance to pay their rent. There was also anger that the European Union had spent millions of pounds during the 1990s on upgrading the neighbouring Wren's Nest Estate, while the Priory Estate remained relatively short on investment.

However, Darby's popularity with the electorate was short-lived. He resigned the following year, and once again Castle and Priory became a Labour stronghold.
