= Lanesfield =

Coordinates: 52.556°N 2.102°W

Lanesfield is a district now within the boundaries of Wolverhampton, specifically in the city council's Spring Vale ward. Lanesfield lies within the Ancient Manor of Sedgley and was a rural village for many years until the growth of the Black Country's industries. Lanesfield's name originates from the Lane family who lived where the area now stands. Originally, Lanesfield was known as Lane's Field.

== History ==
During the 19th century, many houses were built in Lanesfield, particularly in Wood Street, following the industrialisation of the eastern side of the Sedgley district. Many coal mines began to appear around Lanesfield. Two miners' cottages still exist in nearby Parkfields, and are now located on the A4123 Birmingham New Road, built in 1927.

In the 1890s, because it was situated in the eastern area of Sedgley, Lanesfield was separated when the Urban District of Coseley was formed, dividing the old Manor of Sedgley in two. The Birmingham New Road was cut through the area and many new houses (private and council) were built around it soon afterwards.

Following World War II, Coseley Urban District Council built hundreds of new homes in Lanesfield.

== Today ==
Today, the district is mainly a residential area.

Lanesfield, together with the surrounding areas of Parkfield and Ettingshall Park, was incorporated into the Borough of Wolverhampton in 1966 when the Urban District of Coseley was abolished and the former Manor of Sedgley split between authorities.

The first school to be built in Lanesfield was Wood Street School, an infant and junior school which was opened in 1879. The old school was demolished nearly 100 years later after the construction of the new Lanesfield Primary School, a larger building in nearby Newman Avenue, which opened on 30 April 1962. The old school was still being used until December 1968 to further accommodate children on the eastern side of the Birmingham New Road from numerous new houses built at the time. In the early 1950s, another school was built in the western part of Lanesfield - Hill Avenue Primary School. This was for the children on the western side of the Birmingham New Road.

Lanesfield featured in local news on 25 May 2013, when around 60 members of the English Defence League including leader, Tommy Robinson, blocked the Birmingham New Road at its junction with Spring Road and Rookery Road following the murder of Lee Rigby in Woolwich on 22 May 2013.
