= All Saints' Church, Sedgley =

Parish church of Sedgley, West Midlands County, England

The Parish Church of All Saints
- Church of All Saints, Sedgley
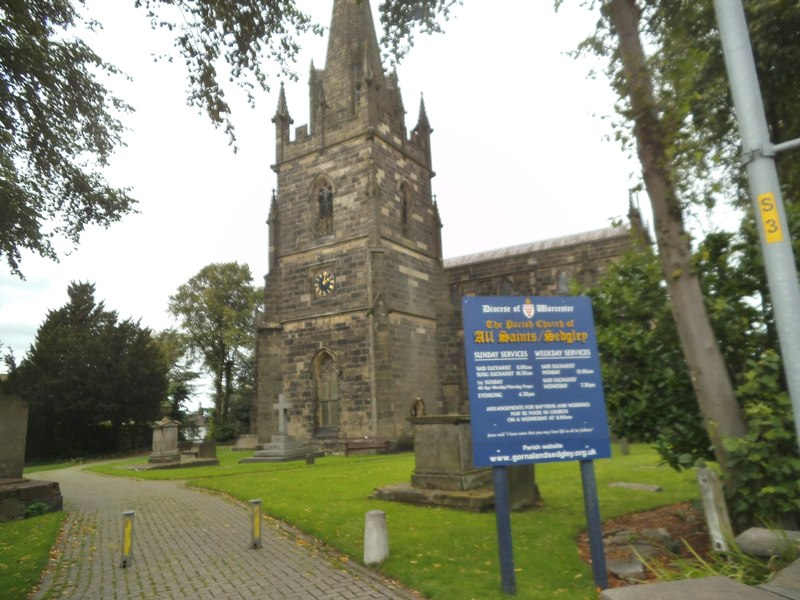
- All Saints' Church, Sedgley
- The Parish Church of All Saints
- 52.540424°N 2.122942°W
- OS grid reference: SO 91759 93629
- Location: Sedgley, Metropolitan Borough of Dudley, West Midlands County
- Country: England
- Denomination: Church of England
- Website: www.gornalandsedgley.org.uk

History
- Status: Parish Church
- Dedication: All Saints
- Dedicated: 1883
- Consecrated: 1883

Architecture
- Functional status: Active
- Heritage designation: Grade II*
- Completed: 1883

Administration
- Province: Canterbury
- Diocese: Worcester

All Saints' Church is the parish church of the town of Sedgley in the Metropolitan Borough of Dudley in the West Midlands County of England. It is dedicated to All Saints and is a Grade II* listed building. It is located on Ladies Walk and near the centre of the town. The spire and tower are a prominent landmark in the town.

== History ==
The first records of the church date back to the Domesday Survey of 1086, but the current structure dates to the early 19th century. Paid for by the Earl of Dudley, the Neo-Gothic building, completed in 1829, originally had a seating capacity of over 1,000, but was later re-seated to hold 850. The church is located on the corner of Vicar Street and Dean Street, with the modern vicarage and church hall on the opposite side of Vicar Street.

At the time, it was the only parish church in the large but relatively lightly populated parish of Sedgley, but the parish was later divided into five ecclesiastical districts, to cover the nine villages of the Manor.

== Present day ==
The church serves as a local landmark and place of worship and community gatherings.
