= County Borough of Dudley =

Coordinates: 52.509°N 2.087°W

Dudley Borough of Dudley
- County Borough
- Population
  - 1911: 51,079
  - 1931: 59,583
  - 1961: 62,965
- History
  - Preceded by: Ancient borough
  - Created: 1865
  - Abolished: 1974
  - Succeeded by: Metropolitan Borough of Dudley
- Status: Municipal borough (1865–1889); County borough (1889–1974)
- Government: Dudley Borough Council
  - HQ: Council House, Dudley
  - Motto: Sapiens qui prospicit (Latin) "He is wise that looks ahead"
- Arms of Dudley Borough Council
- Subdivisions
  - Type: Wards
  - Units: Castle; Netherton; Oakham; Priory; South; St. Andrew's; St. Edmund's; St. James's; St. John's; St. Thomas's; Woodside

The County Borough of Dudley was a local government district in the English Midlands from 1865 to 1974. Originally a municipal borough, it became a county borough in 1889, centred on the main town centre of Dudley, along with the suburbs of Netherton and Woodside. Although surrounded by Staffordshire, the borough was associated with Worcestershire for non-administrative purposes, forming an exclave of the county until 1966, when it was transferred to Staffordshire after an expansion of the borough boundaries. Following local government reorganization in 1974, Dudley took in the boroughs of Halesowen and Stourbridge to form the present-day Metropolitan Borough of Dudley, in the newly formed West Midlands county.

== History ==
Originally an ancient borough, Dudley had been a municipal borough since 1865. However, in 1889 it was granted county borough status under the Local Government Act 1888.

Due to the slum conditions of many houses across the borough, by 1915 the borough council had decided to start building new houses to let to tenants to ease the local housing problem. This began with the purchase of land at Kates Hill known as the Brewery Fields Estate in 1915, where the borough's first council houses were completed by 1918, centred on streets including Corporation Road, Bunns Lane and Highfield Road, where more than 300 houses were built. However, the war effort meant that there were no more council housing developments in Dudley until after the end of the war in November 1918.

By the end of the 1920s, more than 1,000 "Homes for Heroes" had been built by the borough council. These included further developments at Kates Hill as well as Netherton, Woodside and Bowling Green. However, thousands of families in the borough still lived in unfit housing, and in 1926 the boundary of Dudley and the neighbouring Sedgley district had been altered to include the land which would form the Priory Estate, where the first families were housed in 1930. By the outbreak of the Second World War, the borough council had built more than 3,000 homes in the space of 20 years, and 1,269 of these were on the Priory Estate. The nearby Wren's Nest Estate was also built in the mid to late 1930s. Other 1930s developments around Dudley included the Rosland Estate at Kates Hill and the Grace Mary Estate at Oakham.

After the end of the Second World War in 1945, mass council house building in Dudley continued for another quarter of a century. The largest developments of this era were the Sledmere Estate near Oakham in the mid-1950s and the Russells Hall Estate near Himley Road from the late 1950s to mid-1960s. The Old Park Farm estate was also built in the early 1950s on the remaining section of land which had been incorporated into Dudley from Sedgley to allow for the Priory Estate to be built.

The council also built eleven blocks of multi-storey flats in the borough between 1963 and 1969; three at Eve Hill, two at Grange Park, two at Queen's Cross and four at Netherton, although four of those had been demolished by 2001.

In 1966, under recommendations of the Local Government Commission for England, the county borough was expanded to include the vast majority of the area which had formed the Brierley Hill Urban District, as well as the bulk of Sedgley and the southern section of Coseley, and a small section of Tipton. This area also included the buildings on Sedgley Road West previously occupied by Tipton borough council.

The plans for an expansion of the Dudley borough had at one stage included the incorporation of Tipton and Rowley Regis into Dudley, but most of Tipton was absorbed into West Bromwich and Rowley Regis was instead incorporated into the new County Borough of Warley.

As all of these areas were within Staffordshire, Dudley was transferred from Worcestershire to the county of Staffordshire.

=== Areas transferred ===
Existing local authority	Area (acres)	Notes
Amblecote UD, Staffordshire	111	Urban District was abolished; remainder of district was merged into Stourbridge MB (158 acres)
Brierley Hill UD, Staffordshire	2,317	Urban District was abolished; remainder of district was divided between Seisdon RD (45 acres), Stourbridge MB (5 acres), and Warley CB (1 acre)
Coseley UD, Staffordshire	585	Urban District was abolished, with approximately half of the district merged into Dudley; remainder was divided between Walsall MB (2 acres), West Bromwich CB (152 acres), and Wolverhampton CB (542 acres)
Rowley Regis MB, Staffordshire	6	Borough was abolished to form part of Warley CB (1483 acres), with the remainder divided between Halesowen MB (2 acres), and West Bromwich CB (44 acres)
Sedgley UD, Staffordshire	987	Urban District was abolished; remainder of district was divided between Seisdon RD (399 acres), and Wolverhampton CB (161 acres)
Seisdon RD, Staffordshire	6	Parts of Himley transferred (6 acres)
Stourbridge MB, Worcestershire	1	
Tipton MB, Staffordshire	42	Borough was abolished, with the majority merged into West Bromwich CB (834 acres). Remainder formed part of Warley CB (1 acre)
Source: A vision of Britain through Time

Additionally, the section of Oakham and Tividale which was within Dudley was at this time transferred to the newly created County Borough of Warley, which in turn remained in Worcestershire.

In 1974, under the Local Government Act 1972, the county borough was abolished, and along with the former Halesowen and Stourbridge municipal boroughs, was formed into the present Metropolitan Borough of Dudley, which became a part of the metropolitan county of the West Midlands.
