= Coseley =

Village in the West Midlands, England

Coordinates: 52.55°N 2.083°W

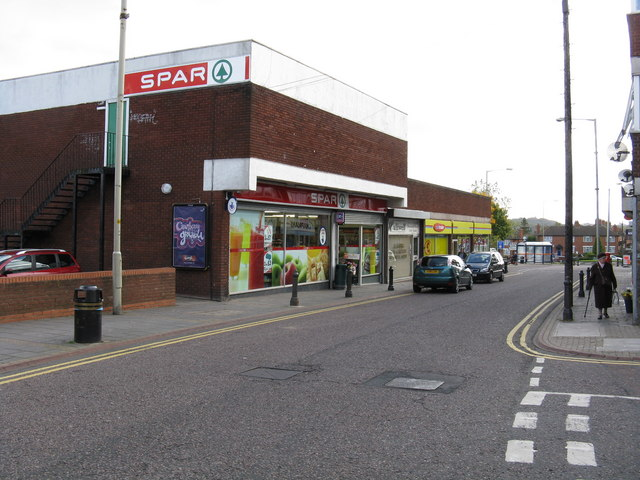
- Castle Street, Coseley, in 2008

- Location within the West Midlands
- Population: 12,400 (2011, ward)
- Metropolitan borough: Dudley
- Metropolitan county: West Midlands
- Region: West Midlands
- Country: England
- Sovereign state: United Kingdom
- Post town: Bilston
- Postcode district: WV14
- Post town: Tipton
- Postcode district: DY4
- Dialling code: 01902, 0121, 01384
- Police: West Midlands
- Fire: West Midlands
- Ambulance: West Midlands
- UK Parliament: Tipton and Wednesbury

Coseley (/ˈkoʊzli/ KOHZ-lee) is a village in the Dudley district, in the county of the West Midlands, England. It is situated three miles (five kilometres) north of Dudley itself, on the border with Wolverhampton and Sandwell. It falls within the Tipton and Wednesbury parliamentary constituency.

== History ==
Coseley was originally a village in the ancient manor of Sedgley. In 1867, it joined with Brierley and Ettingshall to break away from the parish of Sedgley and formed Lower Sedgley Local Board District. In 1875, the name was changed to Coseley Local Board District by order of the board and, in 1895, became Coseley Urban District. At this stage, most of the Coseley area was occupied by industrial and agricultural land; it was known during this time for its Carboniferous fossils.

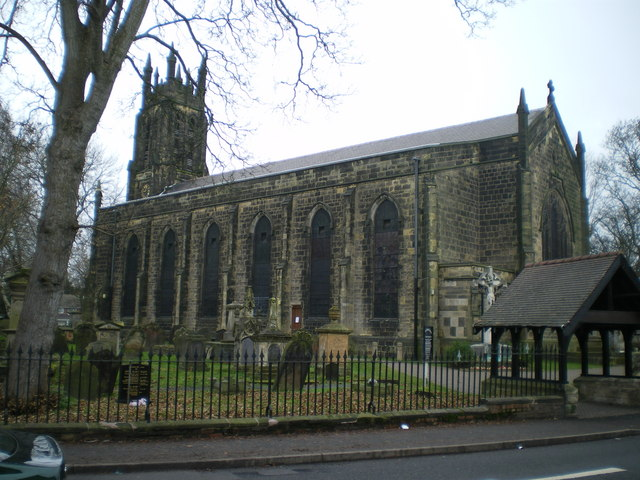
Christ Church, Coseley, built 1827‍–‍1830

Coseley Urban District Council built several thousand council houses and flats over a 40-year period from the mid-1920s which changed the face of the area. Most of these were built around Woodcross, Lanesfield, Wallbrook, and Brierley.

Coseley gained a cinema, on the corner of Mason Street and Birmingham New Road, during the 1930s, part of the Clifton chain, but this closed in January 1963 as a result of the postwar decline in cinema audiences brought on by the rising popularity of home television. The building was later demolished and a veterinary surgery now occupies the site.

Since 1927, Coseley has had a direct road link with Birmingham and Wolverhampton. The Birmingham New Road, a dual carriageway, was laid out at this time.

Bean Cars opened a factory at Coseley in 1919, with another being in operation in central Dudley. The new factory was situated in the south-east of the district near the border with Tipton, and a subsequent second phase of the factory (at the other side of a now-defunct railway line) was actually situated in Tipton, as were its offices in Sedgley Road West, which had been taken over by Tipton Urban District Council by the end of the 1930s. Bean ceased production of passenger cars in 1929, and for the next two years switched to commercial vehicles. After 1931, Bean switched ventures again – this time to making car parts. It was a key supplier for the largest independent British carmaker – British Motor Corporation, British Leyland, Austin Rover, Rover Group and most recently MG Rover – until the business closed due to financial problems in October 2005. Its demise was largely blamed on the closure of its key client MG Rover six months earlier. The Tipton part of the Bean site was demolished shortly afterwards and developed for housing, but the Coseley section was not demolished until the summer of 2008. The land has yet to be redeveloped. The former Newey Goodman site, which was divided into industrial units after the company was broken up during the 1990s, was completely abandoned by 2014, but remains undeveloped.

Cannon Industries, famous for producing gas and electric cookers, was based in Coseley from 1861 until the closure of its Havacre Lane factory in 1993. However, the bulk of the factory buildings were retained as Cannon Business Park, a mix of industrial and commercial ventures. The original factory in Darkhouse Lane lay abandoned for many years but was demolished in 2018 and the site redeveloped for housing. The access road to the new housing development has been named Cannon Park Way.

The main "high street" in Coseley is Castle Street. Most of the current buildings have been built since the 1960s. A by-pass was opened on 23 August 1989, incorporating a widened section of Green Street, to relieve congestion in the town centre.

=== Civic history ===
Coseley was originally part of Staffordshire. Coseley was formerly a chapelry in the parish of Sedgley, in 1894 Coseley became an urban district, on 30 September 1903 Coseley became a civil parish, being formed from the part of Sedgley parish in Coseley Urban District. Coseley had unsuccessfully bid for borough status in 1937. On 1 April 1966, the south of Coseley became part of the County Borough of Dudley, part also went to the County Borough of Wolverhampton, the County Borough of West Bromwich and the County Borough of Walsall. The parish was also abolished on 1 April 1966 and merged with Dudley, Wolverhampton, West Bromwich and Walsall. In 1961 the parish had a population of 39,535. In 1974 it became part of the Metropolitan Borough of Dudley in the West Midlands. However, the north of the Brierley area and most of Ettingshall were merged into the Wolverhampton County Borough instead, while a smaller area bordering Tipton was transferred into the expanded borough of West Bromwich, in turn becoming part of Sandwell in 1974.

Numerous council housing estates were built by Coseley Urban District Council. Some of the first council estates to be built during the 1920s and 1930s included Ward Grove at Lanesfield, Hartland Avenue at Hurst Hill, Norton Crescent at Wallbrook and the Batmanshill Road estate near Princes End. The first sections of the Woodcross Estate were built in the 1930s, but most of Woodcross was built in the 1950s, along with a further housing estate at Hilton Road in Lanesfield and in the south of the district at Central Drive. A large section of the Wallbrook area was redeveloped with houses and three- and four-storey blocks of flats and maisonettes during the 1950s and 1960s. This includes the area around Spencer Avenue and Chaucer Close, which is now affected by high levels of crime, particularly graffiti, vandalism and drink-fuelled anti-social behaviour.

The Coseley Urban District Council Offices were opened in 1897 on the corner of Green Street and School Street, and remained in that building until the dissolution of the Urban District Council in April 1966. They were demolished in about 1970.

== Geography ==
- Roseville – central area of Coseley, situated on the main Birmingham New Road. Local landmarks include Silver Jubilee Park, St Chad's Church, the Old Windmill, and Coseley Canal Tunnel.
- Hurst Hill – situated in the west of Coseley near Sedgley, contains many housing types of different ages.
- Wallbrook – situated in the east of Coseley, near Dudley's boundary with Sandwell.
- Highfields Estate – situated in the north of Coseley near the Dudley MBC boundary with the City of Wolverhampton, and was mostly developed between 1920 and 1970.
- Foxyards Estate – a housing estate in the south of Coseley on land straddling the Dudley/Sandwell boundary. It was mostly developed in the mid-1960s. Foxyards Primary School has served the estate since 1971. George Andrews, who scored Walsall FC's winning goal against Newcastle United in a 1975 FA Cup giant-killing feat, lives on the estate.
- Deepfields – Area of Coseley near the Coseley school. Local landmarks include Coseley School, Coseley railway station, Christ Church, and Coseley Tunnel North portal. The first bridge Wolverhampton-side of the tunnel is named 'Deepfields footbridge'.

Lanesfield, Woodcross, and Ettingshall were all part of Coseley until 1966, when being incorporated into the borough of Wolverhampton. Part of Princes End was also in Coseley until this date, then being transferred into the borough of West Bromwich (Sandwell from 1974) and the township of Tipton.

== Transport ==
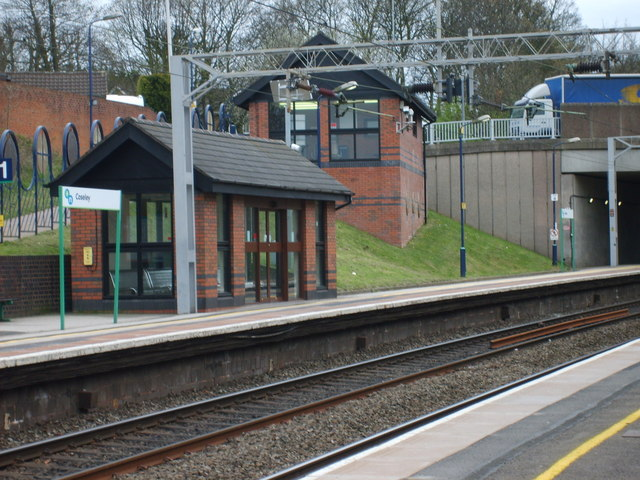
Coseley Railway Station

Coseley railway station on the West Coast Main Line provides a direct rail link to Wolverhampton and Birmingham. The station is currently operated by West Midlands Trains. The area was served by Deepfields & Coseley railway station from 1852 until replaced by the current station in 1902. The former Coseley Urban District had two stations on the Oxford-Worcester-Wolverhampton railway line: Daisy Bank and Princes End and Coseley, both of which closed in 1962.

Bus services in Coseley are operated by National Express West Midlands, Diamond and Banga Buses. Services travel to Sedgley, Dudley, Wolverhampton, Birmingham, Moseley and Bilston on a regular schedule.

== Sport ==
In October 2006 a volleyball club was started in Coseley, which competes in the West Midlands Volleyball League. Coseley Volleyball Club initially trained and played matches at Dudley Leisure Centre, but from 25 February 2007 moved to Coseley Leisure Centre.

Coseley also has a cricket club which has been in existence on a site on Church Road since 1870. They currently have 3 teams playing in the Staffs Club Championship on a Saturday, and two teams that play in the Worcester Borders Sunday League. A Youth section has also been recently introduced.

At the end of the 1950s, plans were announced to build a public swimming pool in Coseley. A site to the east of the centre, in Peartree Lane, was identified, and work began on the site on 25 August 1962, the foundation stone being laid by local councillor and future Mayor of Dudley, John T. "Jack" Wilson. It was opened on 30 November 1963 by fellow councillor John Pointon. A "Supachute" slide was added in the late 1980s, but over the following 20 years the building's condition gradually deteriorated, resulting in closure by Dudley Council in August 2009, with demolition taking place in March 2010.

== Education ==
There have been no secondary schools in Coseley since The Coseley School closed in 2017. Former secondary schools in Coseley were:

- Mount Pleasant Senior School – was a secondary school built in 1913. The school was merged into the new Coseley School in 1969 and survived as that school's annex until July 1972, but the buildings had been used from March 1992 until the early 2010s as the Metropolitan Borough of Dudley's records office and archive service.
- Manor Secondary School – opened in 1933, on Ettingshall Road in the Woodcross area, which was then in its first stages of development, growing rapidly after the end of World War II. However, the growth of the surrounding area after 1945 put pressure on places at the Manor, and by the late 1950s Coseley UDC had decided to build a new secondary modern school on Lawnswood Avenue in the extreme north of the district. The school, Parkfield Secondary Modern School, opened in April 1962, but Manor continued as a secondary school until July 1969, with the buildings being retained to form the new Manor Primary School for the autumn term that year. Parkfield School came under control of Wolverhampton council as a result of boundary changes in April 1966, becoming the South Wolverhampton and Bilston Academy in September 2009 and moving to a new site at Bilston three years later, with the old school buildings being retained as the Orchard Centre, a special school for secondary-aged children.
- The Coseley School – opened off Ivyhouse Lane in 1969. However, Dudley Council put pressure on the school by restricting its funding in the mid-2010s, which led to a decline in pupil numbers, which ultimately ended in the council deciding in early 2016 to close it a year later (with it only open to Year 11 in the final year) because of the low numbers caused by the council.

Current primary schools in Coseley are:

- Christ Church Primary School – has one of the oldest school buildings in Dudley Borough, which is still used as a school, dating from the 19th century.
- Foxyards Primary School – situated on the Foxyards Estate, it was built in 1971 to serve the new Foxyards housing estate and its surrounding area. The first head teacher was Joseph Jones. Jones retired in about 1985 to be succeeded by Mr David Cox, the former deputy head of Cotwall End Primary School in Sedgley. Mr Cox was seconded to the local authority in September 1989 for an academic year, during which time Mrs Evans was acting head teacher. Mr Cox finally left in March 1999 to become head of Alder Coppice Primary in Sedgley. Mrs Pam Greenhalgh was acting head of one term before the appointment of Mrs Sandra O'Gorman, who has been at the helm ever since. Foxyards was built as a one-form entry school for pupils aged from 4 to 11 years, and a nursery unit was added in the mid-1980s. Due to a growing demand for places which saw more than 40 pupils in some year groups, it changed from one-form entry to vertical streaming (up to three classes in two years) in the early 1990s. There are still some mixed age classes in the school, and a new building at the school was opened in 2007 to accommodate growing pupil numbers.
- Hurst Hill Primary School – opened in November 1986 on a new site on Paul Street. It was formed from a merger of St. Mary's Primary School and Mount Pleasant Primary School. The school's first headteacher was Mr Michael Harvey (who had been head of St. Mary's since 1978), with his deputy being Mr Eric Tibble. Mr Tibble became head in the early 1990s on Mr Harvey's retirement, and was succeeded himself by Mrs Joy Powell in 2003, before the appointment of the current headteacher Mr Kevin King in 2007. The school was officially opened on 2 March 1987 by Neil Kinnock, leader of the Labour Party.
- Wallbrook Primary School – located in Bradley's Lane, in the east of Coseley near the Dudley/Sandwell boundary. There are an estimated 275 pupils aged from 3 to 11 on the school roll. The majority of Wallbrook pupils move to The Coseley School on leaving. The school was established in 1954 under headmaster A R Gowland – who was succeeded by L Clarke. The current head is Mrs C Longden.
- Manor Primary School – located on the A4126/Ettingshall Road; in-between Woodcross and the A4123/Birmingham New Road. The school was originally a senior school, until it was turned into a primary school. It is now under the control of Wolverhampton City Council.

Former primary schools in Coseley are:

- Highfields Primary School – opened in September 1972 as a one-form entry primary school to serve the north-eastern part of Coseley. The last head teacher of the school was Leonard Hazelhurst, appointed in September 2003 to replace Mrs Angela Hambrook. The school closed in July 2006 after Dudley MBC decided that falling numbers on the school roll made it no longer viable, and most of the school's remaining pupils were transferred to Wallbrook Primary School. The building has been retained, however, and since March 2008 has housed Rosewood Special School, which relocated from the Russells Hall Estate in southern Dudley.
- Hurst Hill County Primary school (known locally as the 'Board school') was located in Hollywell Street. Although on a single site the school operated as separate infants and juniors, each with their own classrooms, halls and playgrounds. At the start of the autumn term 1964 the school relocated down the hill to the Manor School and the buildings were then used by St. Mary's C of E Primary School.
- Mount Pleasant Primary School – its history can be traced back to October 1879, when a 500-pupil Board School was opened on Mount Pleasant Street by Sedgley School Board. It moved onto a neighbouring site in 1904, with the old infant and junior schools becoming a senior school, but by the early 1980s these buildings were becoming outdated and plans were unveiled to build a new primary school in the area, to replace both this and the nearby St. Mary's Primary School. The school finally closed in November 1986, when Hurst Hill Primary School opened. There were initial plans to retain the Mount Pleasant buildings for community use, but it was ultimately demolished in late 1990 after standing empty for four years. Private housing was later constructed on the site.
- St. Chad's Mixed Infant School – was a Church of England school located on Portland Place, at the top of Oak Street near to St. Chad's Church.
- St. Mary's Primary School – was a Church of England school built during the 19th century to serve the expanding Hurst Hill area of Coseley, and was twinned with the local parish church. Originally located in two buildings in Hurst Road, the primary school was at the corner of Hurst Road and Clifton Street, and the junior school was located in front of St. Mary's Church. It relocated to the old "Board Schools" in Hollywell Street and Horace Street, though was very outdated by the early 1980s and plans were announced for a new school to be built nearby, to replace both St. Mary's and Mount Pleasant schools. Hurst Hill Primary School opened in November 1986 as the replacement, and the St. Mary's buildings were demolished soon afterwards to be redeveloped for private housing.

== Notable residents ==
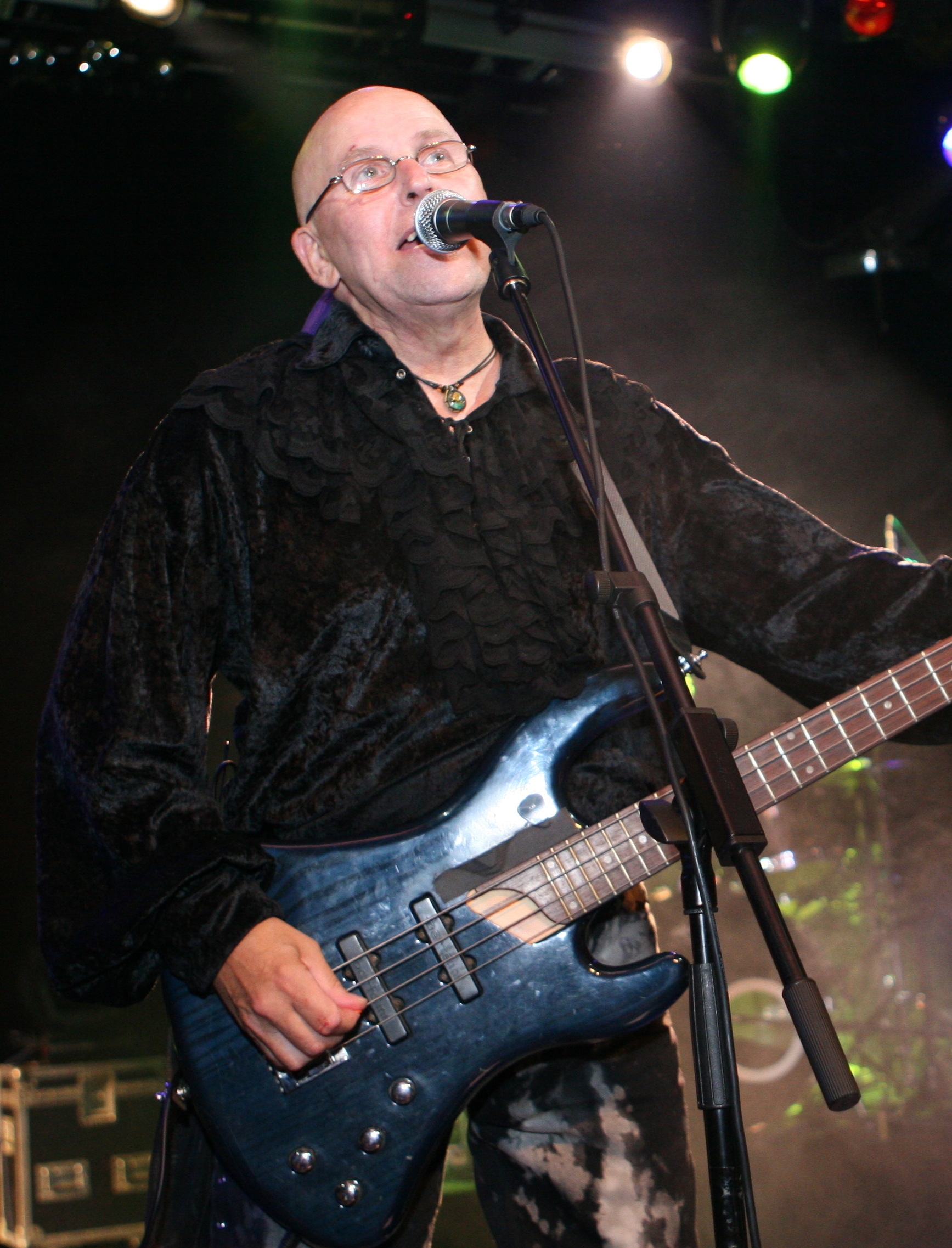
Kelly Groucutt, 2008

- Richard Amner (1736–1803), Unitarian divine and pastor at Coseley, from 1777 to 1794
- Joseph Nicholds (ca. 1785–1860), player of the keyed bugle and composer of sacred music, best known for his oratorio Babylon
- Thomas Barratt (1895–1917), posthumously awarded the Victoria Cross in WWI; now on display at the Staffordshire Regiment Museum.
- Harry Eccleston OBE (1923–2010), the first full-time artist and designer of banknotes at the Bank of England
- Kelly Groucutt (1945–2009), bass-guitarist/singer from the band Electric Light Orchestra from 1974 to 1982.
- Sir Ian Clifford Powell (born 1956), businessman and chartered accountant; has been chairman of Capita since 2017 and was chairman and senior partner at PricewaterhouseCoopers, from 2008 to 2016.

=== Sport ===
- Len Millard (1919–1997), footballer who played 436 games for West Brom
- George Andrews (born 1942), former Walsall, Shrewsbury Town and Southport footballer, played over 430 games.
- Steve James (born 1949), footballer who played 129 games for Manchester United and 105 for York City
