= Sedgley =

Town in the West Midlands, England

Coordinates: 52.540°N 2.123°W

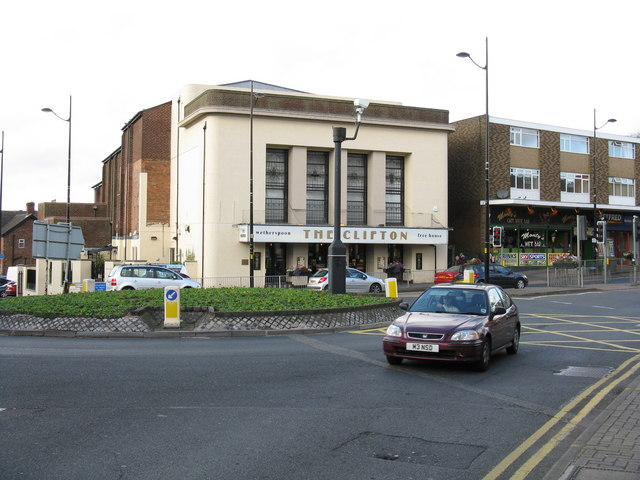
- The Clifton public house and Bull Ring, in the centre of Sedgley

- Location within the West Midlands
- Population: 12,087 (2011.ward)
- OS grid reference: SO918936
- Metropolitan borough: Dudley
- Metropolitan county: West Midlands
- Region: West Midlands
- Country: England
- Sovereign state: United Kingdom
- Post town: Dudley
- Postcode district: DY3
- Dialling code: 01902
- Police: West Midlands
- Fire: West Midlands
- Ambulance: West Midlands
- UK Parliament: Dudley North

Sedgley is a town in the north of the Dudley district, in the county of the West Midlands, England.

Historically part of Staffordshire, Sedgley is on the A459 road between Wolverhampton and Dudley, and was formerly the seat of an ancient manor comprising several smaller villages, including Gornal, Gospel End, Woodsetton, Ettingshall, Coseley, and Brierley (now Bradley). In 1894, the manor was split to create the Sedgley and Coseley urban districts, the bulk of which were later merged into the Dudley County Borough in 1966.

Most of Sedgley was absorbed into an expanded County Borough of Dudley in 1966, with some parts being incorporated into Seisdon and Wolverhampton. Since 1974 it has been part of the Metropolitan Borough of Dudley.

== History ==
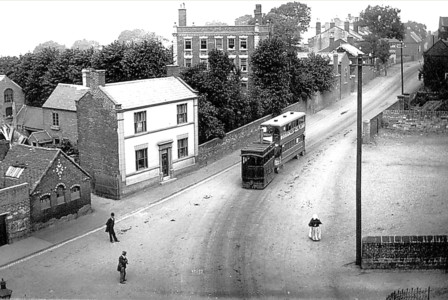
Steam tram at Bull Ring, Sedgley, in the early 20th century

The place name Sedgley was first mentioned in a 985 charter from King Æthelred to Lady Wulfrūn, when describing the Wolverhampton border. The original Old English place name was 'Secg's lēah' – Secg being a personal name (meaning sword-bearing man or warrior) and lēah meaning wood, glade or woodland clearing. Sedgley was also mentioned in the Domesday Book, as an estate held by William Fitz-Ansculf, Lord of Dudley.

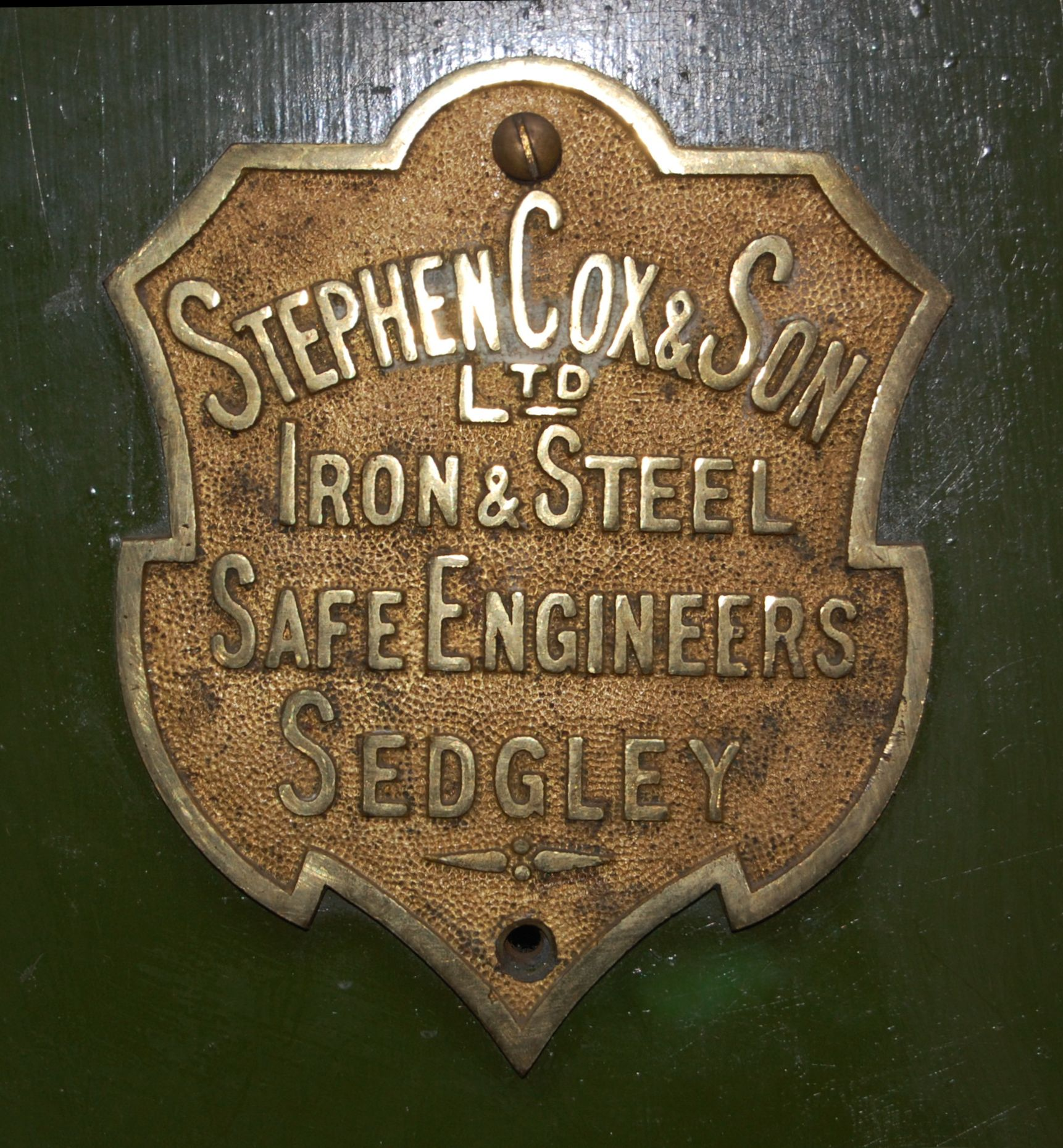
Stephen Cox & Son Ltd, Iron & Steel & Safe Engineers of Sedgley; makers' plate on a safe displayed at the Black Country Living Museum

Originally dotted with farming communities in the middle-ages, the village became industrialized as natural resources such as coal and limestone were exploited, and by the 18th century it was producing goods such as iron and brick.

Sedgley expanded rapidly during the early part of the 20th century, partly in response to the development of the nearby Baggeridge Colliery, despite a depletion in raw materials and a general decline in industry. As industry continued to decline, much of the area became redeveloped, with residential suburbs now dominating the landscape.

Many pre-1900 buildings in Sedgley survive to this day. They include Queen Victoria Primary School (1897), All Saints' Church (1805) and the early 19th century courthouse, now used as a public house.

=== Civic history ===
The ancient Manor of Sedgley consisted of nine villages; Sedgley, Gospel End, Cotwall End, Upper Gornal, Lower Gornal, Woodsetton, Coseley, Ettingshall and Brierley. In 1897, the villages of Coseley, Ettingshall and Brierley broke away from the Manor of Sedgley to form the Coseley Urban District, while Sedgley itself, Gospel End, Cotwall End, Upper Gornal, Lower Gornal, and Woodsetton were formed into the Sedgley Urban District. The entire area was part of the Wolverhampton Parliamentary Borough, created in 1832.

The east of the Sedgley district was transferred into Dudley as long ago as 1926, to allow for the development of the Priory and Wrens Nest Estates, where new council housing was built to rehouse families from the slum clearances in central Dudley in the 10 years leading up to the outbreak of World War II in 1939. The Old Park Farm Estate was added in the early 1950s.

Sedgley Urban District Council survived until 1 April 1966, when the majority of the area was merged into the Dudley County Borough, along with the Coseley and Brierley Hill districts. The Gospel End area, however, was merged into the Seisdon Rural District (later South Staffordshire), and the Goldthorn Park estate in the extreme north of the area was transferred into Wolverhampton. The civil parish was also abolished on 1 April 1966 and merged with Dudley, Himley and Wolverhampton. In 1961 the parish had a population of 27,912.

The Gornal villages are generally not considered part of modern-day Sedgley, nor is the bulk of Woodsetton. Gospel End is no longer even in the same county as Sedgley, having remained in Staffordshire.

== Neighbourhoods ==
=== Bull Ring ===
The central area of Sedgley, so named because it was originally the site of bull baiting before the sport was declared illegal in 1835. All signs of the actual ring were destroyed in about 1930 on the construction of a traffic island, but the traffic island is still known as the Bull Ring.

The current Bull Ring is surrounded by a number of notable buildings. The Court House, built in the early 19th century, was originally the law court for Sedgley but is now empty despite their attempts of a succession of owners to keep in competitive with other local pubs. These law courts were relocated to a building at the nearby police station until the town's courts were declared redundant in 1988. The Red Lion is approximately the same age as the Court House, and was once the village prison. It is still connected to the Court House by a passageway, though this has long fallen into disuse. The Clifton was opened in 1937 as Sedgley's first cinema, and remained open until 1978, when it closed and was converted into a bingo hall before being taken over by JD Wetherspoon and converted into a public house in 1998. The White Horse was built in the 19th century and was refurbished in 2014. Since then it has been the liveliest pub in Sedgley. Monty's wine bar also opened in 1998 in what was once a food store.

Presto opened a large supermarket on High Holborn in the town centre in 1987, on the site of a former filling station – with a former public car park being incorporated into the supermarket. A year later it was re-branded Safeway, and in 2004 it was taken over by the Midcounties Co-Operative. This in turn closed in the April 2017 and was re-opened in August 2017 as an Asda following a major refurbishment.

=== High Arcal Estate ===
Situated to the south of the town centre. It was developed in phases on part of a large field between 1992 and 1996; part of the field has been retained as a public open space and play area. The estate consists of around 300 Housing Association houses, flats and bungalows. Three-bedroom houses are the most frequent type of property in the area. Most residents on the estate are tenants of their homes, while some have shared ownership or full ownership. High Arcal is the largest post-1970s housing development in Sedgley.

=== Cotwall End ===
Cotwall End is situated around the rural Cotwall End Valley, and is one of the nine historic villages of the Sedgley manor.

A few pre-1900 buildings still exist, but the face of the area has changed dramatically since the Second World War by the construction of mostly upmarket detached houses in Cotwall End Road and Catholic Lane. Cotwall End Primary School has served the area since 1962, by which time most of the current surrounding houses had been built.

The Sandyfields Estate between Cotwall End Road and Sandyfields Road was built in the late 1950s, and is similar in style and layout to the nearby Brownswall and Straits Estates.

One of the few surviving buildings from the historic village of Cotwall End is Spout House Farm, which was built in the 18th century and remained in use for some 200 years, finally being abandoned during the 1970s. The farm house and buildings fell into disrepair over the next two decades but were restored in 2001 and converted into apartments.

A nature reserve, Cotwall End Valley, was opened in the area by Dudley council in 1969. Since 2005 the Brockswood Animal Sanctuary, a non-profit making company caring for rescued animals, has operated from the nature reserve.

=== Brownswall Estate ===
Situated to the north of Cotwall End Valley, this private housing estate was developed by Coseley-based builders Joseph Webb between 1956 and 1959, consisting of semi-detached and detached houses and bungalows with either two or three bedrooms. Most of the homes on the estate are three-bedroomed semi detached houses. It is also served by a recreation ground which includes a large football pitch and at one stage also a playground. However, the playground was dismantled in 2000 after more than 10 years of continued vandalism and gradual loss of playing equipment, which had reduced its popularity with local children.

=== Northway ===
Situated north of Cotwall End towards the border with Wolverhampton. The development began in the mid 1950s on land to the north of Gospel End Road, gathered pace in the 1960s and was mostly completed in the 1970s (by which time some 1,000 houses had been built) to join up with Wolverhampton Road.

Alder Coppice Primary School was opened on the Northway estate in 1967.

Alder Coppice, designated a local nature reserve in November 2019, is next to the estate. Also adjoining the estate is Sedgley Hall Park, built in the grounds of Sedgley Hall, a 15th-century house which was demolished in 1966. The park includes playing facilities for children, although some of the playing equipment was dismantled in the 1990s and 2000s due to vandalism.

The centre of the Northway Estate features shops, a medical centre and public house called "The Cabin", which was part of the late 1960s phase of the estate.

=== Beacon Estate ===
The Beacon Estate was built by Sedgley UDC in the shadow of Beacon Hill during the 1920s and 1930s, with two small sections being added in the 1940s and 1950s. Some of the first houses built by Sedgley UDC were on the estate.

During the early hours of 28 July 2012, Shane Watson, a 23-year-old man who lived on the estate, was found murdered in an alleyway on the estate. Two local men, Shylon Wishart and James Cartwright, were later convicted of Mr Watson's murder and sentenced to life imprisonment.

== Places of interest ==
=== All Saints' Church ===
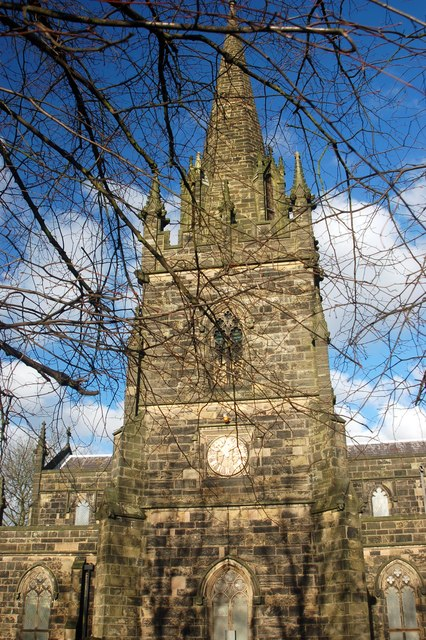
All Saints' Church, Sedgley

All Saints' Church is a parish church situated in the centre of Sedgley. The first records of the church date back to the Domesday Survey of 1086, but the current structure dates to the early 19th century. Paid for by the Earl of Dudley, the Neo-Gothic building, completed in 1829, originally had a seating capacity of over 1,000, but was later re-seated to hold 850. The church is located on the corner of Vicar Street and Dean Street, with the modern vicarage and church hall on the opposite side of Vicar Street.

At the time, it was the only parish church in the large but relatively lightly populated parish of Sedgley, but the parish was later divided into five ecclesiastical districts, to cover the nine villages of the Manor.

=== Baggeridge Park ===
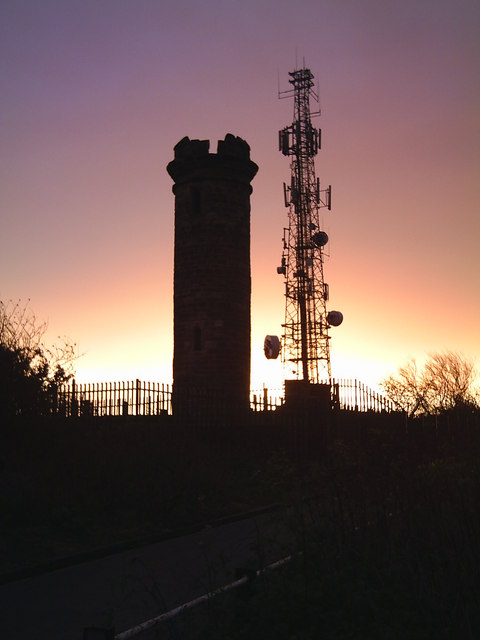
Sedgley Beacon

Baggeridge Park is a country park located 1.5 miles south-west of Sedgley in Gospel End. Originally part of the Earl of Dudley's Himley estate, coal mining operations began on the site in 1902, with the opening of the Baggeridge Colliery. After its closure in 1968 the colliery was bought by Seisdon Rural District Council, and later granted country park status in 1970. Full reclamation of the land commenced in January 1981, with the park officially opened by Princess Anne in June 1983. It has so far been largely free of many of the problems which have become increasingly common across the rest of Sedgley since then.

=== Sedgley Beacon ===
Beacon Hill, one of several Beacon hills in England, is 237 metres (778 ft) above sea level, one of the highest points in the West Midlands. It is well known for fossils. The hill was once the site where beacons were lit to warn local people of invaders. Sedgley Beacon Hill provides views across the Black Country, Cannock Chase and Birmingham to the east, and to the Wrekin, Clee Hills and Malvern Hills to the west; on very clear days it is possible to see the hills of North Staffordshire and Derbyshire, as well as the mountains of both North and South Wales. It is also possible to see another Beacon hill – Barr Beacon, some 15 miles away.

=== Sarah Hughes Brewery ===
The Sarah Hughes Brewery founded in 1921 in a Victorian brew house and pub is situated in Bilston Street, Sedgley, attached to the Beacon Hotel.

== Education ==
=== Primary schools ===
- Queen Victoria Primary School – built in 1897, in the town centre.
- Cotwall End Primary School – built in 1962, situated about half a mile west of the town centre. It provides a two-form entry for pupils aged 3–11 years.
- Alder Coppice Primary School was opened in 1967 and situated about a mile north-west of the town centre on the Northway Estate.
- St Chad's Catholic Primary School is a Catholic primary school, although non-Catholic children are permitted to attend. The school opened in 1870 in a building attached to the church.
- Straits Primary School – built in 1968 to serve the (then) new Straits housing estate. It is about two miles south-west of the town centre.

=== Secondary schools ===
- Dormston School – built in 1935, situated in the centre of Sedgley. Has expanded greatly since the late 1960s, and since 1996 has included a sixth form centre in partnership with Dudley College. Its status changed from secondary modern to comprehensive in 1975. The age range on its opening was 11+, before changing to 12–16 in 1972 and 11–16 in 1990.
- High Arcal School – built in 1961, situated about half a mile east of Sedgley in Woodsetton, and was a grammar school until becoming comprehensive in 1975. It had a sixth form until 1990. Sixth form facilities returned to the school in 2002, when the sixth form being run in partnership with Dormston School and Dudley College was extended to High Arcal.

=== Former schools ===
- Flax Hall Primary School – opened in the 1950s but closed in 1989 due to falling pupil numbers. The school buildings survive and are now used as a community centre.
- Tudor County Primary School – opened in the late 19th century, served the community of Upper Gornal until its closure in July 1986. The school buildings were used as an adult education centre until their demolition in 1996, when the site was redeveloped for housing.

== Transport ==
Due to its hilly geography Sedgley has never had a rail or canal link, although near its historic border with Kingswinford there was a halt on the railway between Stourbridge and Wolverhampton known as Gornal Halt which opened in 1925 and closed in 1932 after just seven years in use, although the line on which it was situated survived into the 1960s.

However, it is served by bus routes to neighbouring areas such as Wolverhampton, Dudley, Bilston and Tipton. Services 27, 27A, 223, 224 and 229 are operated by Diamond Bus and service 1 is operated by National Express West Midlands.

== Crime ==
Crime in Sedgley increased significantly during the 1990s and early 2000s, but has fallen in more recent years. In the ward of Sedgley (which includes the town centre, Brownswall, Northway and Beacon estates as well as some of the High Arcal Estate) it was not uncommon for more than 100 crimes to be reported in a single month – with anti-social behaviour by teenagers being particularly rife, more often than not fuelled by alcohol or drugs. The police regularly had to deal with incidents at Dormston School involving pupils. However, by 2014 the number of reported crimes in the Sedgley ward has regularly fallen to less than 50 crimes in a month, with the final two months of 2013 seeing less than 40 crimes reported each month.
