= Seisdon Hundred =

Hundred in Staffordshire, England

Seisdon
- Former subdivision of England
- Seisdon Hundred (red) shown in Staffordshire
- History
  - Origin: Anglo-Saxon period
  - Created: 10th century
  - Abolished: 1894 (obsolete)
  - Succeeded by: various
- Status: obsolete area
- Government: Hundred
- Subdivisions
  - Type: Parishes (see text)
  - Units: Parishes

Seisdon is a hundred in the county of Staffordshire, England, located in the south-west of that county. It is named after Seisdon, a locality in the parish of Trysull and Seisdon.

Seisdon Hundred (19th Century)

== Etymology ==
The name appears to mean "hill of the Saxons", deriving from the Anglo-Saxon words Seis meaning Saxon and Dun meaning hill. The first element may alternatively be a personal name. A large number of Hundred names refer to hills or mounds. Some of these at least are very conspicuous hills, which afford a commanding view of the countryside for miles around. It seems likely that such sites were chosen as being' remote, and where interference was most easily avoided. The hundred and the hamlet may be named from the hill that was the meeting place of the hundred, instead of the hundred being named after the hamlet.

== History ==
The origin of the hundred dates from the division of his kingdom by King Alfred the Great into counties, hundreds and tithings. From the beginning, Staffordshire was divided into the hundreds of Seisdon, Pirehill, Totmonslow, Cuttleston and Offlow. Each hundred was formed to support a military unit.

Seisdon Hundred is the smallest in area of the five hundreds of Staffordshire, but it has a relatively high population density and agricultural productivity. It formed the south-western portion of the county, bounded on the west by Shropshire, on the south by Worcestershire, on the east by Offlow Hundred, and on the north by Cuttleston Hundred. The old Forest of Brewood formed the boundary of Seisdon and Cuttleston.

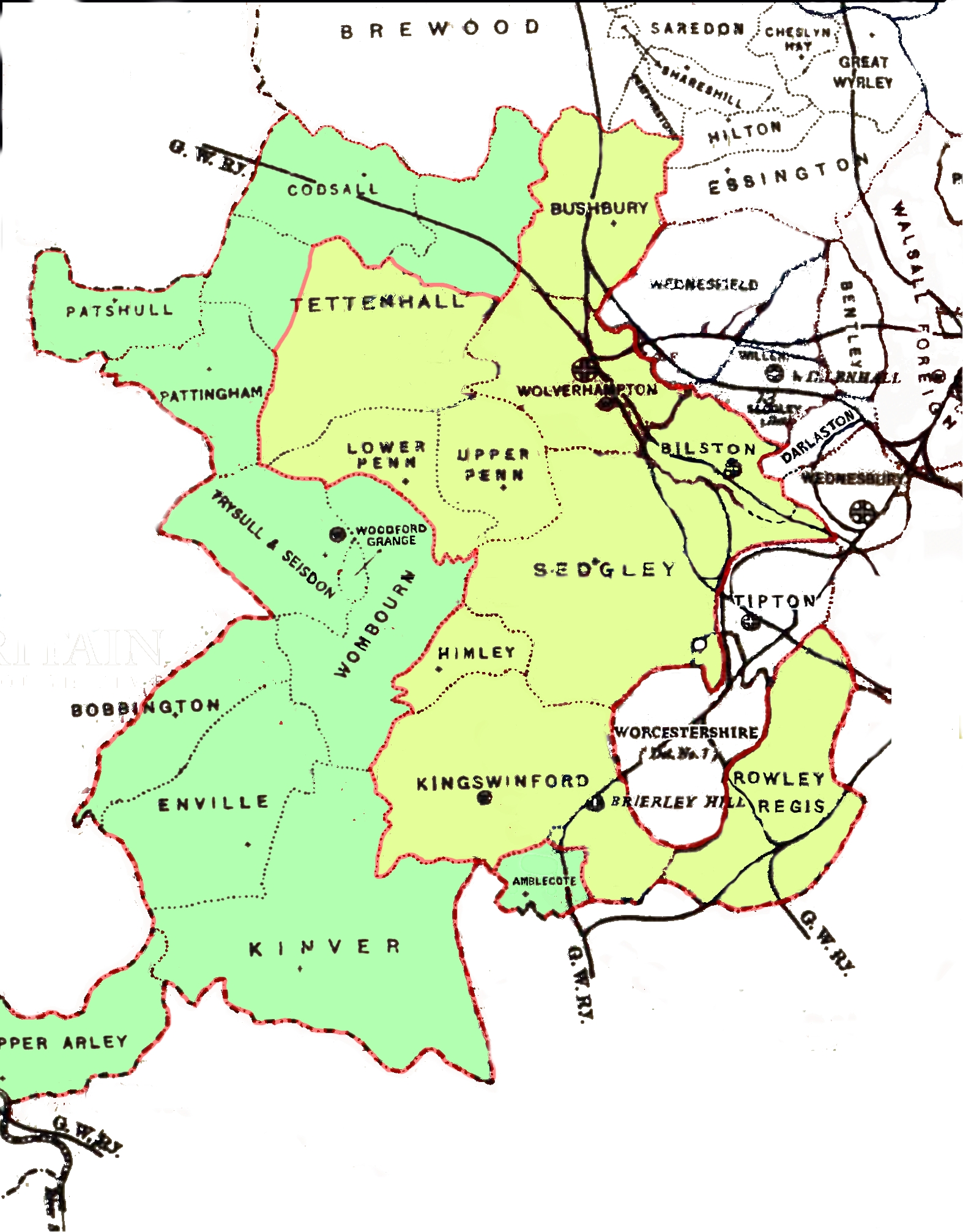
Seisdon Hundred Dark green:South Division Light green:North Division

The Hundred contained Wolverhampton, the largest town of the county, and many populous villages, which were constituted into 15 parishes, part of 5 others and 2 extra-parochial areas. The extensive parish of Wolverhampton contained several townships, only some of which were in Seisdon Hundred.

Seison Hundred was divided into North and South Divisions. each with their own High Constable. This arrangement dates back to 17th century, at least.

One parish, Tettenhall, was divided between the two Divisions of Seisdon. The parish was subdivided into 4 Prebends Two of these, Pendeford and Wrottesley, belonged to Seisdon South and the rest of the parish was in Seisdon North.

The town of Dudley with its suburbs formed a detached portion of the county of Worcestershire. However, Dudley Castle, a ruined castle, with the limestone hill on which it stands, was an extra-parochial area in Seisdon South. It had no inhabitants.

Clent (including Broome and Rowley Regis) were seized by the Sheriff of Staffordshire (called Aevic) in 1016, which resulted in them becoming part of Staffordshire Although they were now in Staffordshire, in 19th century Broome, Clent, and Rowley Regis were the only parishes in Staffordshire not included in the Diocese of Lichfield, as they belonged to that of Worcester. All three parishes were included in Seisdon Hundred, but the parishes of Clent and Broome formed a detached part of Staffordshire surrounded by Worcestershire and a detached part of Shropshire. They left Seisdon Hundred in 1844 as they were transferred to Worcestershire.

Seisdon contained following local government units:

Seisdon North

NAME	UNIT	AREA
Bushbury (part)	Parish
Bushbury	Township	3,520
Dudley Castle Hill	Extra Par.	69
Himley	Parish	1,200
Kingswinford	Parish	7,130
Penn	Parish	3,890
Rowley Regis	Parish	3,670
Sedgley	Parish	5,170
Tettenhall (Part)	Parish	4,119
Tettenhall with Compton	Prebend
Pirton with Trescott	Prebend
Wolverhampton (part)	Parish
Wolverhampton	Township	3,200
Bilston	Township	2,580
TOTAL		34,548

Seisdon South

NAME	UNIT	AREA
Bobbington (part)	Parish	1,880
Broome	Parish	550
Clent	Parish	2,520
Codsall	Parish	2,580
Enville	Parish	4,930
Kinver (Kinfare)	Parish	8,790
Old Swinford (part)	Parish
Amblecote	Hamlet	570
Patshull	Parish	1,850
Pattingham (part)	Parish	2,710
Tettenhall (Part)	Parish
Pendeford	Prebend	1868
Wrottesley	Prebend	2319
Trysull	Parish	3,110
Upper Arley	Parish	5,160
Wombourne	Parish	4,680
Woodford Grange	Extra Par.	180
TOTAL		43,697

The Hundred presented a great diversity of soil and scenery. It was rich in coal, ironstone, lime, and freestone, and renowned for its extensive mines and iron works, and for the manufacture of a great variety of articles in iron, steel, and other metals.
