= History of Staffordshire =

Flag of Staffordshire

Staffordshire is a landlocked county in the West Midlands of England. It adjoins Cheshire to the north west, Derbyshire and Leicestershire to the east, Warwickshire to the south east, West Midlands and Worcestershire to the south, and Shropshire to the west. The historic county of Staffordshire includes Wolverhampton, Walsall, and West Bromwich, these three being removed for administrative purposes in 1974 to the new West Midlands authority. The resulting administrative area of Staffordshire has a narrow southwards protrusion that runs west of West Midlands to the border of Worcestershire. The city of Stoke-on-Trent was removed from the admin area in the 1990s to form a unitary authority, but is still part of Staffordshire for ceremonial and traditional purposes.

The historic county has an area of 781,000 acres (1,250 sq. miles) and at the first census in 1801 had a population of 239,153.

== Iron Age and Roman ==
Early British remains exist in various parts of the county; and a large number of barrows have been opened in which human bones, urns, fibulae, stone hammers, armlets, pins, pottery and other articles have been found. In the neighbourhood of Wetton, near Dovedale, on the site called Borough Holes, no fewer than twenty-three barrows were opened, and British ornaments have been found in Needwood Forest, the district between the lower Dove and the angle of the Trent to the south. Several Roman camps also remain, as at Knave's Castle on Watling Street, near Brownhills.

== Anglo-Saxon ==
The county symbol, the Staffordshire Knot, is seen on an Anglian stone cross that dates from around the year 805. The cross still stands in Stoke churchyard. Thus the Knot is either i) an ancient Mercian symbol or ii) a symbol adopted from the Irish Christianity, Christianity having been brought to Staffordshire by Irish monks from Lindisfarne about AD 650.

The district which is now Staffordshire was invaded in the 6th century by a tribe of Angles who settled about Tamworth, afterwards famous as a residence of the Mercian kings, and later made their way beyond Cannock Chase, through the passages afforded by the Sow valley in the north and Watling Street in the south. The district was frequently overrun by the Danes, who in 910 were defeated at Tettenhall, and again at Wednesfield, and it was after Edward the Elder had finally expelled the Northmen from Mercia that the land of the south Mercians was formed into a shire around the fortified burgh which he had made in 914 at Stafford.

The county probably first came into being in the decade after the year 913; that being the date at which Stafford – the strategic military fording-point for an army to cross the Trent – became a secure fortified stronghold and the new capital of Mercia under Queen Æthelflæd.

The county is first mentioned by name in the Anglo-Saxon Chronicle in 1016 when it was harried by Canute.

== Norman Conquest ==
The resistance which Staffordshire opposed William the Conqueror was punished by ruthless harrying and confiscation, and the Domesday Survey supplies evidence of the depopulated and impoverished condition of the county, which at this period contained but 64 mills, whereas Dorset, a smaller county, contained 272. No Englishman was allowed to retain estates of any importance after the Conquest, and the chief lay proprietors at the time of the survey were Earl Roger of Montgomery; Earl Hugh of Chester; Henry de Ferrers, who held Burton and Tutbury Castles; Robert de Stafford; William Fitz-Ansculf, afterwards created first Baron Dudley; Richard Forester; Rainald Bailgiol; Ralph Fitz Hubert and Nigel de Stafford. The Ferrers and Staffords long continued to play a leading part in Staffordshire history, and Turstin, who held Drayton under William Fitz Ansculf, was the ancestor of the Bassets of Drayton. At the time of the survey Burton was the only monastery in Staffordshire, but foundations of canons existed at Stafford, Wolverhampton, Tettenhall, Lichfield, Penkridge and Tamworth, while others at Hanbury, Stone, Strensall and Trentham had been either destroyed or absorbed before the Conquest.

== Later middle ages ==
In the 13th century Staffordshire formed the archdeaconry of Stafford, including the deaneries of Stafford, Newcastle, Alton and Leek, Tamworth and Tutbury, Lapley and Creigull. In 1535 the deanery of Newcastle was combined with that of Stone, the deaneries remaining otherwise unaltered until 1866, when they were increased to twenty. The archdeaconry of Stoke-on-Trent was formed in 1878, and in 1896 the deaneries were brought to their present number; the archdeaconry of Stafford comprising Handsworth, Himley, Lichfield, Penkridge, Rugeley, Stafford, Tamworth, Trysull, Tutbury, Walsall, Wednesbury, West Bromwich and Wolverhampton; the archdeaconry of Stoke-on-Trent comprising Alstonfield, Cheadle, Eccleshall, Hanley, Leek, Newcastle-under-Lyme, Stoke-on- Trent, Trentham and Uttoxeter. In the wars of the reign of Henry III. most of the great families of Staffordshire, including the Bassets and the Ferrers, supported Simon de Montfort, and in 1263 Prince Edward ravaged all the lands of Earl Robert Ferrers in this county and destroyed Tutbury Castle. During the Wars of the Roses, Eccleshall was for a time the headquarters of Queen Margaret, and in 1459 the Lancastrians were defeated at Blore Heath.

== Hundreds of Staffordshire ==
The five hundreds of Staffordshire existed since the Domesday Survey.

The origin of the hundred dates from the division of his kingdom by King Alfred the Great into counties, hundreds and tithings. From the beginning, Staffordshire was divided into the hundreds of Totmonslow, Pirehill, Offlow, Cuttleston and Seisdon.

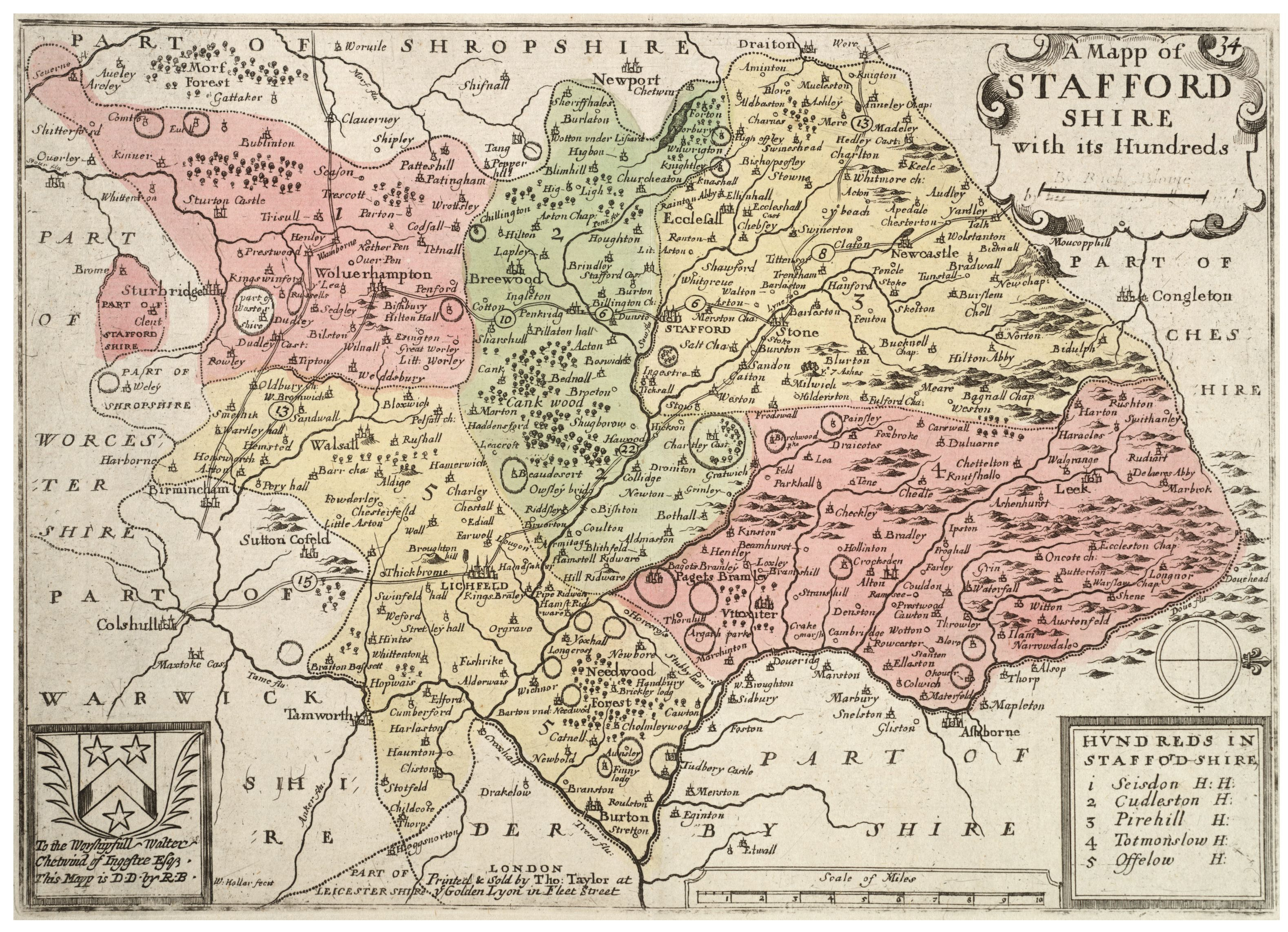
Hundreds of Staffordshire (with North to the right)

== See also ==
- Lost houses of Staffordshire
