= Swinfen (disambiguation) =

Swinfen is a community in England.

Swinfen may also refer to:

- Swinfen and Packington, a civil parish in Staffordshire, England
- Swinfen v. Swinfen, a series of English trials over the will of Samuel Swynfen
- Baron Swinfen, a title in the Peerage of the United Kingdom
  - Charles Swinfen Eady, 1st Baron Swinfen (1851–1919), British lawyer and judge
- John Swinfen (1613–1694), English politician
- Michael Swinfen-Broun (1858–1948), English soldier, magistrate, High Sheriff and Deputy Lieutenant
- Reg Swinfen (1915–1996), English footballer
