= John Swinfen =

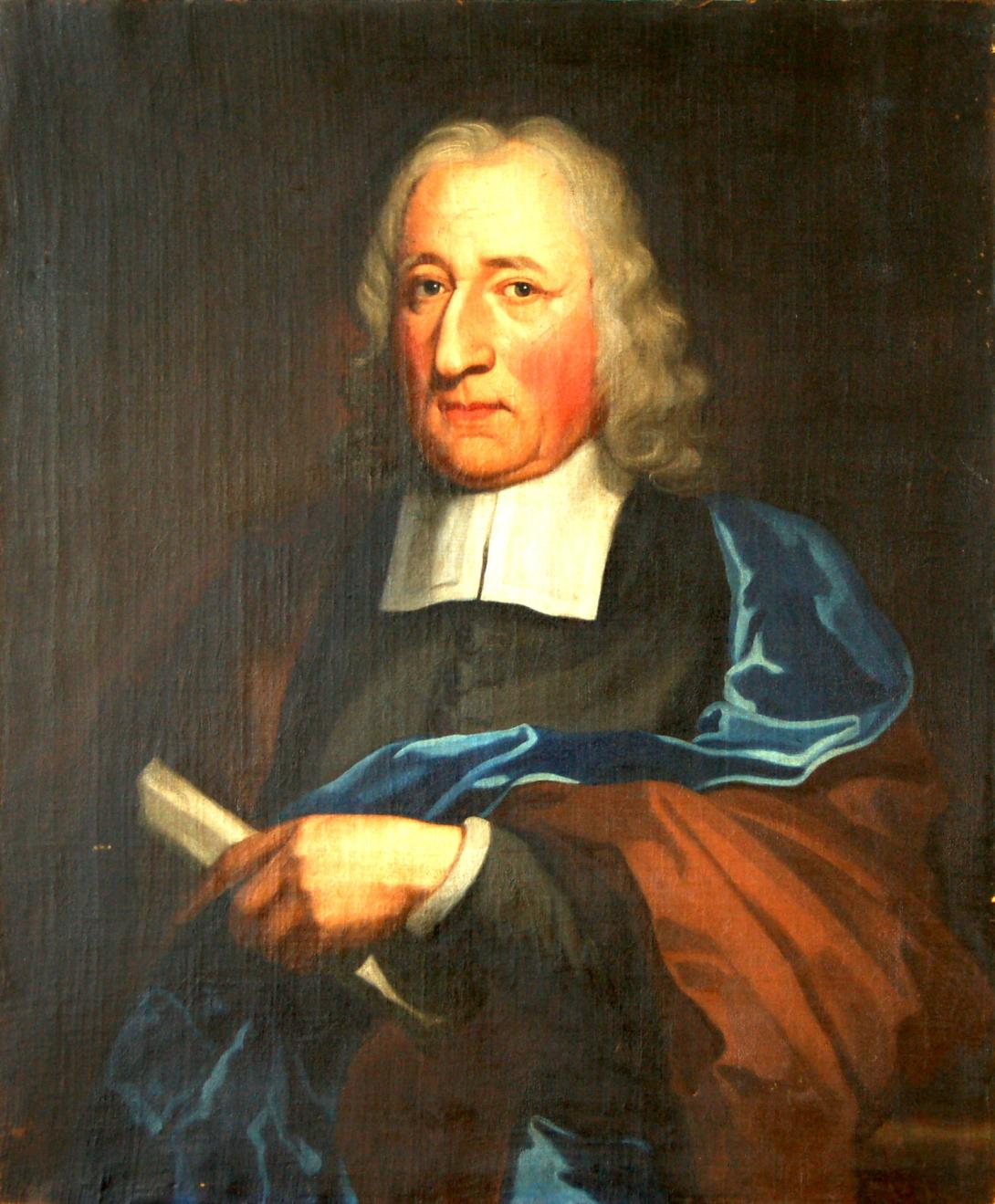
- portrait by Godfrey Kneller
- Born: 19 March 1613
- Died: 10 May 1694 (aged 81); Birmingham
- Occupation: Politician
- Position held: Member of Parliament in the Parliament of England

John Swinfen (19 March 1613 – 12 April 1694) was an English politician who sat in the House of Commons variously between 1645 and 1691. He supported the Parliamentary cause in a civil capacity in the English Civil War.

Swinfen was probably the son of Richard Swinfen, of Swinfen, Staffordshire. He was educated at Pembroke College, Cambridge and graduated BA in 1632. In 1645, Swinfen was elected Member of Parliament for Stafford in the Long Parliament. He was excluded in Pride's Purge in 1648. He was one of the Parliamentary Commissioners for Staffordshire.

In 1659, Swinfen was elected MP for Tamworth in the Third Protectorate Parliament. He was elected MP for Stafford in 1660 in the Convention Parliament. In 1661 he was elected MP for Tamworth for the Cavalier Parliament and sat until 1679. He was re-elected MP for Tamworth in 1681 and sat until 1685. In 1690, he was elected MP for Bere Alston and sat until 1691.

Swinfen lived at Swinfen Hall near Freeford. He was commonly called " Russet-coat," from his affected plainness of dress. He died at the age of 81 and was buried at Weeford, Staffordshire.

Swinfen married Ann Brandreth, daughter of John Brandreth and Jane Weston.

Parliament of England
Preceded by Ralph Sneyd; Richard Weston	Member of Parliament for Stafford; 1645–1648; With: Edward Leigh	Succeeded by Not represented in the Rump Parliament
Preceded by Not represented	Member of Parliament for Tamworth; 1659; With: Captain Thomas	Succeeded by Restored Rump
