= Bessie Bonehill =

English vaudeville performer

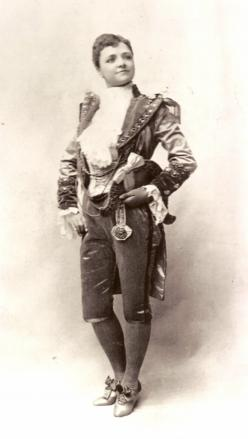

Background information
- Birth name: Betsey Bonehill
- Also known as: Betsey Smith
- Born: 17 February 1855 West Bromwich, Staffordshire, England
- Died: 21 August 1902 (aged 47) Portsea, Portsmouth, England
- Genres: Vaudeville
- Occupation(s): Singer, comic entertainer, male impersonator
- Years active: 1860s–1901

Bessie Bonehill (17 February 1855 – 21 August 1902) was an English vaudeville singer, comic entertainer and male impersonator. She toured widely in the United States in the 1890s, becoming "one of the most famous and wealthy entertainers of her day".

== Biography ==
She was born into a poor family in West Bromwich, Staffordshire, England. Official records give her birth name as Betsey Bonehill. She appeared in the 1860s as a double act with her sister Marion. After cropping her hair, she became well known as a "principal boy" actor in local pantomimes, before moving to London and appearing as a male impersonator and performer of "coster songs" in theatres in the 1870s and 1880s. Many of her songs were written by Arthur West, (Note: Arthur West (born 1864 Birmingham, England – died 7 January 1894 Manhattan) was an English songwriter living in Manhattan at East 10th Street at the time of his death. He died of pneumonia at Saint Vincent's Hospital in Manhattan was buried by the Actors Fund, in their plot, at Evergreens Cemetery; he was married to, but separated from, Kitty La Blanche, whom he married in London around 1888; actress Bessie Bellwood had nursed him during his illness.) a friend of Charlie Chaplin. In 1877 she married Louis Abrahams, and had two daughters and a son with him.

While she was appearing in London, American vaudeville impresario Tony Pastor persuaded her to travel to the United States to perform. She first appeared in Pastor's Theatre, on 14th Street, Manhattan, in 1889. The New York Times described her as "lithe and frisky, strident as to voice and nimble as to feet.... [S]he is as much at home in masculine garb as if to the manner born." According to her local obituary, "her success was immediate and her male impersonations were the theatrical sensation of the winter. Her beauty, cheerful personality and her entire freedom from vulgarity were new then in male impersonation." Her song "Comrades", which she performed as a newsboy, was a success, and she toured widely in the United States.

She remained in the United States for most of the next decade, bringing her family with her; a British music hall manager said that "she had sold out to the mighty dollar". In 1890 she married for the second time, to an American, William Smith (known professionally as William Seeley), who was several years her junior; they had a son. She performed in the musical Little Christopher, and another show, Playmates, written by her husband, before returning to vaudeville as the head of her own traveling company which toured across the United States. She was sometimes billed as "England's Gem", and as "England's Favorite Comedy Cantatrice". One reviewer described her as "the best character singer ever imported to these shores". Her style as a male impersonator was adopted by later artists such as Vesta Tilley and Hetty King.

The company included her husband and son Jack (from her first marriage), who performed together as a musical comedy act, Seeley and West. The company also toured in Britain, Europe, South America, and South Africa, from where they had to escape at the start of the Boer War. Bessie Bonehill settled with her family around 1896 on a run-down 600-acre estate, Deer Hill Farm, at Sayville on Long Island, which they developed as a family home.

She started a tour in England in 1901, but fell ill from what was later diagnosed as stomach cancer. She died on 21 August 1902 at Portsea, Portsmouth, Hampshire at the age of 47. She was buried (as Betsey Smith) at Kingston Cemetery, Portsmouth.

== Selected productions ==
- Playmates; OCLC 499560044

Produced 18 November 1993
Bessie Bonehill and Her Metropolitan Company
Written by W.R. Seeley (né William Robert Smith), Bessie's then husband
Genre: Musical comedy
Costumes designed by Worth, Judie, Bon Marché, Paris
Choreography by E.L. Darem
Music team
Venues: 360 nights in New York City, then a tour of the South, including Fort Worth (September 1894) and Shreveport (September 1894)
Selected artists: Gallagher and West; Seeley and West, the great musical team; Signor Borelli, a real Italian count, playing the comic role of Paderewski; John Pendy, character actor; Miss Alida Perrault; Annette Zelna; Rose Beaumont; Lulu Leslie; Clio Vernon; Olive Tremaine; Cora Hart; Maud Pearson; and others

Selected songs from Playmates sung by Bonehill:

1. "Playmates" (1890); OCLC 863493871, 438188403, 497831557

Harry Dacre (w&m)
Edmund Forman (arranger)
London: Francis, Day & Hunter Ltd. (publisher)

2. "Buttercups and Daisies"
3. "Thou Art Ever in My Thoughts" (1893); OCLC 726905816

(copy courtesy Johns Hopkins University)
Charles K. Harris (w&m)
Milwaukee: Wm Rohlfing & Sons (William Rohlfing; 1830–1908) (publisher)

4. "Boys Will Be Boys"
5. "Young John Bull"
6. "My Mother's Honored Name"
7. "Jolly Jack"
8. "Three Little Chaps" (1893); OCLC 57755027, 498084607

Arthur West (w&m)
New York City: Frank Harding (publisher)
Chicago: National Music Company (publisher)
London: Francis, Day & Hunter Ltd. (publisher)

1. "Father Knickerbocker"
2. "Girls of Today (1888);" OCLC 45623761

George Le Brunn (music)
John P. Harrington (words)
London: Francis, Day & Hunter Ltd. (publisher)

11. "Kittie Brown" ("Katie Brown") (1892); OCLC 45623764

Arthur West (w&m)
H.G. Banks (cover art lithograph)
London: Francis, Day & Hunter Ltd. (publisher)

== Family ==
First marriage

Bessie Bonehill was first married to Louis William Abraham (approx. 1857 Manchester, England – 21 April 1890 Bow, London). They married on 20 September 1877, in Shoreditch, London at Saint Leonard's Church. From that marriage they had three children:

1. Selina M. Abrahams (9 September 1878 England – September 1976 Chestnut Hill, Massachusetts) who performed in theater as "Lena Hilbon." She married Benjamin Joseph Steverman 23 November 1902, in Brookline, Massachusetts.
2. Michael Elias Abrahams (4 February 1880 Greater London – 15 April 1950 Denver), who, in the 1890s, performed in Bonehill's productions as "Jack West" in the duo Seeley and West, William Seeley being the stage name of Bonehill's second husband. Michael Abrahams, also, confusingly, once adopted the stage name of John Seeley. Sometime before 1910, his official name became Jack West.
3. Marion Rebecca Bessie Abrahams (14 October 1881 London – September 1970 Orangeburg, New York) who performed in theater as "Dappa Grey." She married Geoffrey Menderson Weiler (1876–1936) 20 July 1903, in Manhattan.

Second Marriage

After the death of her first husband, Bonehill married William Robert Smith (1862 – 29 March 1929 Manhattan, New York), professionally known as "W.R. Seeley". They married 14 September 1890, in Buffalo, New York, at Saint Paul's Episcopal Church. From that marriage they had one son:

William Smith (born around 1891 – date of death not known).
