= HM Prison Swinfen Hall =

Prison in Staffordshire, England

Coordinates: 52.652884°N 1.805148°W

HMP Swinfen Hall
- Interactive map of HMP Swinfen Hall
- Location: Swinfen, Staffordshire
- Security class: Adult Males/Young Offenders
- Capacity: 500
- Population: 624 (May 2009)
- Opened: 1963
- Closed: N/A
- Managed by: HM Prison Services
- Governor: Laura Whitehurst
- Website: Swinfen Hall at justice.gov.uk

HM Prison Swinfen Hall is a Category C men's prison and Young Offenders Institution, located in the village of Swinfen (near Lichfield) in Staffordshire, England. The prison is operated by His Majesty's Prison Service.

== History ==
The prison is named after Swinfen Hall, which stands opposite the prison. HMP Swinfen Hall opened in February 1963 as a Borstal. In 1972 it became a long-term young offenders' institution.

In April 2001, an inspection report from His Majesty's Chief Inspector of Prisons highly praised Swinfen Hall, naming the institution as a centre of excellence. The report stated that Swinfen Hall was a place "in which the needs as well as the characteristics of young, adolescent prisoners, are understood and catered for". The prisons anti-bullying schemes and programmes which examine offending behaviour were also praised.

A major building project began at Swinfen Hall in spring 2004, following significant increases in the prison population. The new construction was to develop existing accommodation and facilities for prisoners.

In January 2006, Swinfen Hall was one of only five institutions to get the top ranking in the list compiled by the Prison Service, achieving the level four category which is reserved for prisons which are exceptionally high performing and which consistently meet or exceed targets.

== The prison today ==
Swinfen Hall receives young offenders (aged 18-28) serving 4 years to life. The prison also holds Category C prisoners serving over 4 years. Prisoners are housed in 9 wings, in single cell accommodation.

Swinfen Hall is piloting a scheme in preparation for the proposed abolition of detention in a young offender institution for those under 21. The work at Swinfen Hall is at the heart of the government's overall delivery plan for reducing reoffending. At Swinfen Hall individual needs are identified early, and through an active and integrated regime of education skills training and the specialised accredited offending behaviour and substance abuse courses, needs are addressed and risks reduced. Working together with national corporations, local businesses, voluntary organisations, the Learning and Skills Council, education providers and others, contributes to the success of the training and development needs for prisoners at Swinfen Hall and prepares them for a crime free life on release.

Most recent Inspectorate report (4) finds prison performance is not sufficiently good, except in preparations for release where it is reasonably good. Described as a regime that lacked purpose, with many prisoners unemployed or without sufficient activities.

Mandatory tests show 45% of population are active drug users. 'In May 2025 the Prison Officers Association claimed that Governors have been accused of losing control of the prison after a male officer was stabbed in the head and two female colleagues were punched in the face during serious disturbances. As a category C prison it is supposed to offer education and training to prisoners. In December [2024], the prison watchdog, Charlie Taylor, said the prison regime “lacked purpose”, with nearly a third of the prisoners locked in their cells.'
