= Tamhorn =

Former civil parish in Staffordshire, England

Coordinates: 52.6613°N 1.7373°W

- Former subdivision of England
- History
  - Origin: Anglo-Saxon period
  - Created: 11th century or earlier
  - Abolished: 1934
  - Succeeded by: part of Fisherwick civil parish
- Status: former civil parish
- Government: extra parochial area (later civil parish)

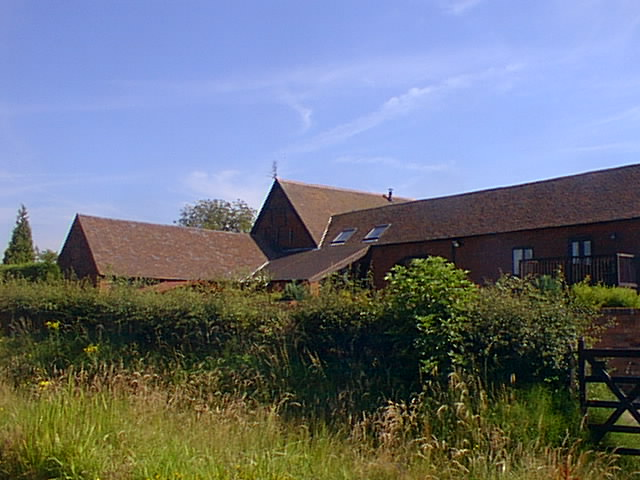
Tamhorn House

Tamhorn is a former civil parish, now in the parish of Fisherwick, in the Lichfield district, in the county of Staffordshire, England, 2 1/2 miles north-west of Tamworth. It was an extra-parochial area in Offlow hundred until 1858, when it became a civil parish. It was annexed to Fisherwick parish on 1 April 1934. It had an area 770 acres. The population was 5 in 1841 and 19 in 1931, the last census before its annexation.

It lies in the valley of the river Tame adjacent to the Birmingham and Fazeley Canal. The name Tamhorn is Old English meaning a bend in the river Tame or specifically the horn of land formed by the bend.

It was mentioned in the Domesday Book (1086) as part of the Bishop of Lichfield's manor. By the later 17th century the settlement consisted only of the manor house, the predecessor of the present Tamhorn Park Farm. Tamhorn was an estate containing 108 acres of woodland and a farm of over 500 acres, which was not included in any parish. In 1827 the estate was bought by Sir Robert Peel, later Prime Minister of the United Kingdom. The house on the estate, now known as Tamhorn Park Farm, was built in the early 18th century in a L-shape, but later that century it was enlarged changing the shape to a square.
