= Listed buildings in Trysull and Seisdon =

Trysull and Seisdon is a civil parish in the district of South Staffordshire, Staffordshire, England. It contains 22 listed buildings that are recorded in the National Heritage List for England. Of these, one is at Grade II*, the middle of the three grades, and the others are at Grade II, the lowest grade. The parish contains the villages of Trysull and Seisdon and the surrounding countryside. All the listed buildings are in the villages, apart from a lock on the Staffordshire and Worcestershire Canal and a bridge crossing it. Most of the listed buildings are houses, cottages, farmhouses and farm buildings, the earlier of which are timber framed. The other listed buildings include a church, a public house, two road bridges, two mills, and a war memorial.

== Key ==
Grade	Criteria
II*	Particularly important buildings of more than special interest
II	Buildings of national importance and special interest

== Buildings ==
Name and location	Photograph	Date	Notes	Grade
All Saints Church, Trysull; 52.54603°N 2.21960°W		12th century	The church was altered and extended during the centuries and was restored in 1889 and in 1897. It is built in sandstone with tile roofs, and consists of a nave, north and south aisles, a south porch, a chancel, a northwest vestry and a west tower, The tower has three stages, clasping buttresses, a west door, and an embattled parapet.	II*
Meadow Croft Cottage, Seisdon; 52.55034°N 2.23600°W	—	16th century (probable)	The cottage was altered and extended in the 19th century. The original part is timber framed with cruck construction and brick infill, the extension is in painted brick, and the roof is tiled. There is one storey and an attic, an L-shaped plan, and a front of three bays. The windows are casements, and there are eyebrow dormers. Three cruck trusses have survived.	II
Old Stone House, Seisdon; 52.55222°N 2.23711°W	—	c. 1600	The house was restored and extended in the 1970s. The original part is in sandstone with a tile roof. There are two storeys and an attic, two bays, and the extension is to the north. The windows are chamfered and mullioned with hood moulds.	II
Windrush Cottage, Seisdon; 52.55081°N 2.23570°W	—	16th or 17th century	The cottage has one storey and an attic. The ground floor is in painted sandstone and brick, and the attic is timber framed. The roof is tiled and there are two bays and a lean-to extension. In the front is a doorway with a bracketed hood, and the windows are casements.	II
Ketley House, Trysull; 52.54542°N 2.21951°W	—	Early 17th century	The house was extended in the 18th and 19th centuries. The original part is timber framed with brick infill and some replacement in brick, and the extensions are in painted brick. The west front has two storeys, with the 17th-century range to the left and the 18th-century gabled wing to the right. The windows are casements, and there is a datestone in the gable.	II
Trysull Manor House, Coach house and stable block 52.54586°N 2.22364°W	—	1637	The house, which was remodelled in about 1900, is in timber framing and brick, the ground floor is roughcast, the upper floor is tile hung, and the roof is tiled. There are two storeys and an L-shaped plan, with two ranges at right angles, and a front of seven bays. The outer two bays of the front are gabled, and in the centre is a two-storey gabled porch. The porch has a chamfered surround, and carries an inscription, and the windows are casements. To the east the coach house and stable block form three ranges round a courtyard, and are in red brick with mullioned windows.	II
Croft Cottage, Trysull; 52.54403°N 2.22055°W	—	17th century	The cottage is timber framed with brick infill, partial replacement in brick, and with a slate roof. There is one storey and an attic, the right part of the front is timber framed, and the left part is in brick. The windows are casements, in the left part they have segmental heads, and there are three flat-roofed dormers. The doorway has a flat hood on scrolled wrought iron brackets, and the rear is fully timber framed.	II
The Plough Inn, Trysull; 52.54368°N 2.22051°W		17th century	The public house was altered and extended in the 18th and 19th centuries. The original part is timber framed with brick infill, the extensions are in painted red brick, and the roof is tiled. The 17th-century part is L-shaped, the 18th century range is at the rear, and in the 19th century a wing was added to the north. Facing the road are two storeys and two bays, the left bay gabled with an apex finial, and the right bay with pilaster strips. The south front has one storey and an attic, a dentilled eaves band, three bays, and casement windows in gabled dormers.	II
The Old Manor House, Seisdon; 52.55006°N 2.23804°W		1684	The house was remodelled and extended in the 19th century. It is in red brick and has dentilled bands, and a tile roof with coped verges. There are two storeys and attics, a principal front range, a lean-to extension on the right, two parallel rear wings, and further extensions. On the front are three bays, two gables with finials, and a blind extension bay to the left flanked by pilasters with ball finials. Steps lead up to the central porch that has a four-centred arch, a cornice, and a coped parapet. To the left is a canted bay window with a hipped roof, the other windows are sashes with chamfered architraves, and in the attics are mullioned windows.	II
Lanes Farmhouse, Seisdon; 52.55271°N 2.23357°W		1746	A red brick farmhouse with a dentilled eaves band and a tile roof. There are two storeys and an attic, three bays, and three rear wings. Flanking the central doorway are canted bay windows, the other windows are pivoted and have wedge lintels grooved as voussoirs, and there is a central datestone.	II
Barn, Lanes Farm, Seisdon; 52.55287°N 2.23406°W	—	1747	The barn is in red brick with a dentilled eaves band and a tile roof with stepped verges. There is one storey and five bays. It contains two segmental-arched barn doors, eight tiers of air vents, and a central datestone.	II
Mill House and Mill Barn, Seisdon; 52.55097°N 2.23886°W	—	1749	The house, and the former barn later converted into a house, are in painted brick with tile roofs. The house has two storeys and an attic, and three bays. The former barn has dentilled eaves bands, one storey and five bays. The windows are casements with segmental heads, there are thee dormers, and there is a gabled porch and a doorway with a fanlight.	II
Former cartshed and stable, Lanes Farm, Seisdon; 52.55267°N 2.23393°W	—	Mid 18th century	The building is in red brick with a dentilled eaves band and a tile roof with stepped gables. There is one storey and an attic, and two bays. On the front are two segmental-arched cart entrances, and external steps lead up to a loft door in the right gable end.	II
Bridge No 49 (Awbridge Bridge) and lock 52.55157°N 2.20825°W		c. 1770	The bridge carries a road over the Staffordshire and Worcestershire Canal. It is in red brick, and consists of a single arch with a stone coped perforated parapet. The abutments have pilasters with pyramidal caps. A short flight of steps leads up to the lock. The bridge, lock and towpath are also a Scheduled Monument.	II
Bridge over Smestow Brook, Trysull; 52.54722°N 2.21982°W		Late 18th century	The bridge carries Trysull Holloway over Smestow Brook, and it consists of three segmental arches. The piers are in engineering brick, the spans and the balustrade are in cast iron, and the keeled cutwaters are in brick with stone caps.	II
The Red House, Trysull; 52.54584°N 2.22179°W		Late 18th century	The house is in red brick with giant corner pilasters, floor bands, a moulded eaves cornice, and a hipped tile roof. There are three storeys and three bays, the middle bay projecting under a pediment. The central doorway has a fanlight and a pediment, and the windows are sashes with raised architraves, bracketed sills, and keystones. In the lower two floors of the outer bays are Venetian windows. On each side of the house are single-bay links to pavilions, each with one storey and an attic, a pedimented gable, a casement window with a semicircular head, and a blind lunette above. The left link has one storey and contains a doorway and a window, and the right link has two storeys with two windows in the ground floor and one above.	II
Bridge over Smestow Brook, Seisdon; 52.55094°N 2.23772°W	—	Early 19th century	The bridge carries Ebstow Road over Smestow Brook. It is in red brick with stone dressings, and consists of three segmental arches. The bridge has alternate raised voussoirs, two keeled cutwaters, a plain parapet string course, and a coped parapet. The abutments sweep forward.	II
Mill building, Seisdon; 52.55102°N 2.23841°W		Early 19th century	The mill building is in red brick with a tile roof, two storeys and an attic, and two bays. The windows are metal casements, and there is a doorway in the gable end.	II
Seisdon Hall; 52.54847°N 2.23680°W	—	c. 1840–50	The house incorporates some 17th-century material, and is in Jacobean style. It is built in red brick with a sill band, and has tile roofs with coped and shaped gables. There are two storeys and attic, five gabled bays, and a two-storey single-bay wing on the right. Most of the windows are cross windows with architraves, raised keystones, segmental heads, and hood moulds, and some have ball finials. The porch has a semicircular arched doorway.	II
Beech Hurst Farmhouse, Seisdon; 52.55146°N 2.23626°W		Mid 19th century	A red brick farmhouse with a dentilled eaves band and a tile roof. There are two storeys, and a T-shaped plan, with a front of two bays, and a rear wing. The windows are sashes, the ground floor windows and the central doorway have bracketed hoods, and the upper floor windows have moulded architraves.	II
Trysull Mill; 52.54730°N 2.22069°W		1854	A watermill that was converted into a house in the 20th century, it is in red brick with blue brick dressings, and has a tile roof. There are three storeys and six bays defined by pilasters. The doorway and the windows, which are casements, have segmental heads, and there is a segmental-headed sluice opening. In the left gable end is a loft door with a canopied hoist, and inside is a cast iron waterwheel.	II
War Memorial, Trysull; 52.54619°N 2.21982°W		1919	The war memorial is in the churchyard of All Saints Church. It is in stone, and consists of a hooded Latin cross on a tapering shaft, on a square plinth, on four circular steps. On the shaft are carved decorative details, and on the plinth, which has a rounded shoulder are inscriptions.	II
