= Listed buildings in Swinfen and Packington =

Swinfen and Packington is a civil parish in the district of Lichfield, Staffordshire, England. It contains twelve buildings that are recorded in the National Heritage List for England. Of these, one is listed at Grade II*, the middle of the three grades, and the others are at Grade II, the lowest grade. The parish contains the hamlet of Swinfen and the surrounding countryside. The listed buildings consist of three country houses and associated structures, farmhouses, and farm buildings.

== Key ==
Grade	Criteria
II*	Particularly important buildings of more than special interest
II	Buildings of national importance and special interest

== Buildings ==
Name and location	Photograph	Date	Notes	Grade
Freeford Hall; 52.66561°N 1.80081°W	—	Early 18th century	A country house that was extended in the 19th century. It is in red brick with stone dressings, a blocking course and a cornice, and hipped tile roofs. The plan is around an open court, and has a front with two storeys and attics, a central block of five bays, and slight recessed flanking wings. The central block has pilasters, and a central pediment with dentils and a lunette in the tympanum. In the centre is a two-storey porch with quoins, a rusticated ground floor, a cornice, and a coat of arms finial. The windows are sashes with wedge lintels, those in the central block with keystones and aprons. The south front has six bays, a central recess, and a wrought iron canopy.	II
Horsley Brook Farmhouse; 52.65514°N 1.78610°W	—	Mid 18th century	A red brick farmhouse with a floor band, and a tile roof with verge parapets on corbeled kneelers. There are two storeys and an attic, and three bays. The windows are transomed small-pane casements, and there are three gabled dormers.	II
Granary and cart shed, Horsley Brook Farm; 52.65508°N 1.78635°W	—	Mid 18th century	The granary and cart shed are in red brick, and have a tile roof with verge parapets. There is a single storey and attics, and an L-shaped plan, with a lean-to extension. The building contains a casement window with a segmental head, cart entries, and external stairs that have a dog kennel with a segmental head below the flight. In the left gable end are dove nesting boxes and ledges.	II
Packington Hall; 52.65418°N 1.76072°W	—	18th century	A country house, later offices, it is in rendered brick with quoins, bands, a moulded cornice, a coped embattled parapet, three curved gables, and obelisk-finials. There are two storeys and attics, and a front of nine bays. In front of the middle three bays is a porte-cochère with Doric half-columns and an embattled parapet with obelisk-finials. The windows are casements with quoined surrounds, round-arched heads, and keystones. On the sides are two-storey bow windows with embattled parapets and obelisk-finials.	II
Whitehouse Farmhouse; 52.65459°N 1.81605°W	—	Mid 18th century	The farmhouse is in rendered brick with a tile roof. There are two storeys and an attic, and four bays. The windows are sashes with wedge heads and keystones, and there are four gabled dormers.	II
Swinfen Hall, steps and terraces 52.65139°N 1.80265°W		1755	A country house, later a hotel, designed by Benjamin Wyatt in Baroque style, and extended in the 19th and 20th centuries. It is in red brick with stone dressings on a stone plinth and has a balustraded parapet and a flat roof. The entrance front has two storeys, six bays, a dentilled cornice with an attic storey above and another cornice, and a segmental pediment containing a cartouche. On the front are two giant Ionic pilasters, and the windows are sashes with moulded surrounds and keystones. The central doorway, approached by steps, has Tuscan columns, a triglyph frieze, and a flat pediment. On the garden front is a semicircular projection with a balustraded parapet. In front of this is a balustraded terrace in Portland stone with two flights of concave steps. The 19th-century extension projects from the left part of this front; it has a front of six bays and sides of three bays.	II*
Barn, Horsley Brook Farm; 52.65535°N 1.78665°W	—	Late 18th century	The barn is in red brick with corbelled eaves and a tile roof. It contains a threshing door, another doorway, and five tiers of vents. On the south gable end are external steps.	II
Ingley Hill Farmhouse; 52.65773°N 1.78849°W	—	Late 18th century	A red brick farmhouse with dentilled eaves, and a tile roof with verge parapets on corbelled kneelers. There are two storeys and an attic, three bays, and a lower rear wing. The central doorway has a segmental head and a fanlight, the windows are casements with segmental heads, and there are three gabled dormers. In the rear wing are two blocked elliptical-headed cart entrances.	II
Barn, Ingley Hill Farmhouse; 52.65786°N 1.78912°W	—	Late 18th century	The barn is in red brick, and has a tile roof with verge parapets on corbelled kneelers. It contains a threshing door with a segmental head, six tiers of vents, a hay loft door.	II
Hackney stable and smithy, Horsley Brook Farm; 52.65542°N 1.78628°W	—	Early 19th century	The buildings are in red brick on a stone plinth, with an eaves band and tile roofs. The stable has a single storey and a loft, and contains a stable door and a loft door, both with segmental heads. The former smithy is lower and to the north, and contains a segmental-headed entry.	II
Malthouse, Packington Hall Farm; 52.65551°N 1.76689°W	—	c. 1840	The malthouse is in red brick on a plinth, with dentilled eaves, and a tile roof with a coped gables. There are two storeys and a basement, six bays, and a kiln at the west. The openings include doorways, basement openings and windows, and in the upper storey are three loft doors.	II
Balustrade and wall, Swinfen Hall; 52.65174°N 1.80206°W	—	Late 19th century	The wall, which runs along the northeast side of the garden, is in brick with stone coping. It is about 1 metre (3 ft 3 in) high and 150 metres (490 ft) long, and at each end is a curving balustraded parapet in Portland stone.	II
