= Trysull and Seisdon =

Conjoined civil parish in the county of Staffordshire, England

Coordinates: 52.5478°N 2.2303°W

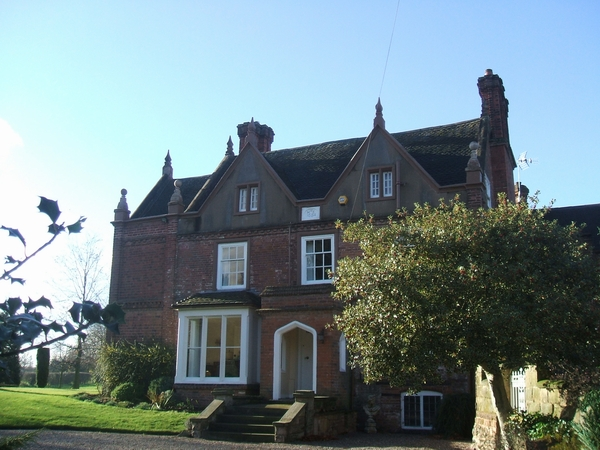
An image of Trysull and Seisdon

Trysull and Seisdon is a conjoined civil parish in the South Staffordshire non-metropolitan district, in the county of Staffordshire, England. The population of the civil parish taken at the 2011 census was 1,150. It is in the lowest tier of local government below districts and counties. It is both an administrative parish, and an ecclesiastical parish formed from the two historic villages of Trysull and Seisdon.

== Background ==
Although a historic entity, the civil parish, in its modern sense, was established afresh in 1894, by the Local Government Act 1894. It was part of Seisdon Rural District until 1974.

== Governance ==
There is a parish meeting, consisting of all the electors of the parish. Generally a meeting is held once a year. There is an elected parish council which exercises various local responsibilities given by statute.

== Population ==
The 2011 census recorded a usually resident population for the parish of Trysull & Seisdon of 1,150 persons in 455 Households.

== See also ==
- Listed buildings in Trysull and Seisdon
