= Totmonslow =

Hundred in Staffordshire, England

Coordinates: 52°57′N 2°00′W

- Former subdivision of England
- 1894
- Totmonslow Hundred (red) shown in Staffordshire
- History
  - Origin: Anglo-Saxon period
  - Created: 10th century
  - Abolished: 1894 (obsolete)
  - Succeeded by: various
- Status: obsolete area
- Government: Hundred
- Subdivisions
  - Type: Parishes (see text)
  - Units: Parishes

Totmonslow is a hundred in the county of Staffordshire, England. The hundred is in the north-east of Staffordshire and is named after the hamlet of the same name, which is a half mile east of Draycott in the Moors. The hamlet was the seat of the hundred court.

== Derivation of names ==
The name of the place derives from Old English Tatmonn, a personal name and hlaw meaning 'hill' or 'mound'. Other examples of this personal name are recorded from the 10th century onwards (e.g. Roberto Tateman 1190–200). A large number of Hundred names refer to hills or mounds. Some of these at least are very conspicuous hills, which afford a commanding view of the countryside for miles around. It seems likely that such sites were chosen as being remote, and where interference was most easily avoided.

== History and organisation ==
The origin of the hundred dates from the division of his kingdom by King Alfred the Great into counties, hundreds and tithings. From the beginning, Staffordshire was divided into the hundreds of Totmonslow, Pirehill, Offlow, Cuttleston and Seisdon.

Totmonslow is one of the largest of the 5 hundreds of Staffordshire, having an area of 169,788 acres (265 sq.miles) and the population in 1851 was 50,050. The hundred was divided into two divisions Totmanslow North and Totmanslow South by the Justices of the Peace, which an area of 100,234 and 69,554 acres respectively. Each had its own constable and Petty Sessions. The Petty Sessions for the South division were held at Ellastone.

The importance of the hundreds declined from the 17th century, and most of their functions were extinguished with the establishment of county courts in 1867. In 1894 the Hundred was made obsolete with the establishment of Urban Districts and Rural Districts in Staffordshire.

== Geography ==
Totmonslow, or Totmanslow, is the north-eastern Hundred of Staffordshire, and contains the upland region called the Staffordshire Moorlands, located at the southern end and foothills of the Pennines, with some of the northern parts falling in the Peak District National Park. It consists of limestone in the north east, mostly forming the White Peak, and formerly coal, while the far north consists of gritstone which forms the Dark Peak. The district contains the valleys of the rivers Dove, Manifold, Hamps, Tean, Blithe, Dane, and Churnet, which have their principal sources in the Hundred, and here receive many small but rapid streams from the high, peaty moorlands and rocky uplands.

Totmonslow Hundred

The Hundred has an irregular, oval figure, stretching from the three shire stone, above Flash, southward to Uttoxeter, a distance of 25 miles, and averaging from 10 to 15 miles in breadth. The River Dove forms its eastern boundary for nearly 30 miles, and separates it from Derbyshire; and for about 10 miles at its northern extremity, it is divided from Cheshire by the River Dane. In the 19th century it contained four market towns, Leek, Longnor, Cheadle, and Uttoxeter, and about 80 townships located in 10 chapelries and 30 parishes.

After centuries of sheep-grazing the uplands of northern Staffordshire are now to a large extent moorland, although even before this, the region was mostly unattractive to early settlers. It is noteworthy, as showing where the centres of these hundreds lay, that the meeting-places of the two northern hundreds (Pirehill and Totmonslow) are in the extreme south of the respective hundreds.

== Parishes ==
The hundred contained the following parishes:

| Parish | Pop. 1831 |
|---|---|
| Alveton | 2401 |
| Alstonefield | 4757 |
| Blore | 354 |
| Bradley in the Moors | 75 |
| Bramshall | 170 |
| Cauldon | 347 |
| Caverswall | 1207 |
| Cheadle | 4119 |
| Checkley | 2247 |
| Cheddleton | 1664 |
| Croxden | 272 |
| Dilhorne | 1510 |
| Draycott in the Moors | 539 |
| Ellastone | 1344 |
| Gratwich | 116 |
| Grindon | 431 |
| Horton | 878 |
| Ilam | 210 |
| Ipstones | 1325 |
| Kingsley | 1416 |
| Kingston | 368 |
| Leek | 10789 |
| Leigh | 1038 |
| Mayfield | 1366 |
| Oakover | 62 |
| Rocester | 1040 |
| Sheen | 366 |
| Uttoxeter | 4864 |
| Waterfall | 531 |
| Wetton | 497 |
| Total | 46303 |

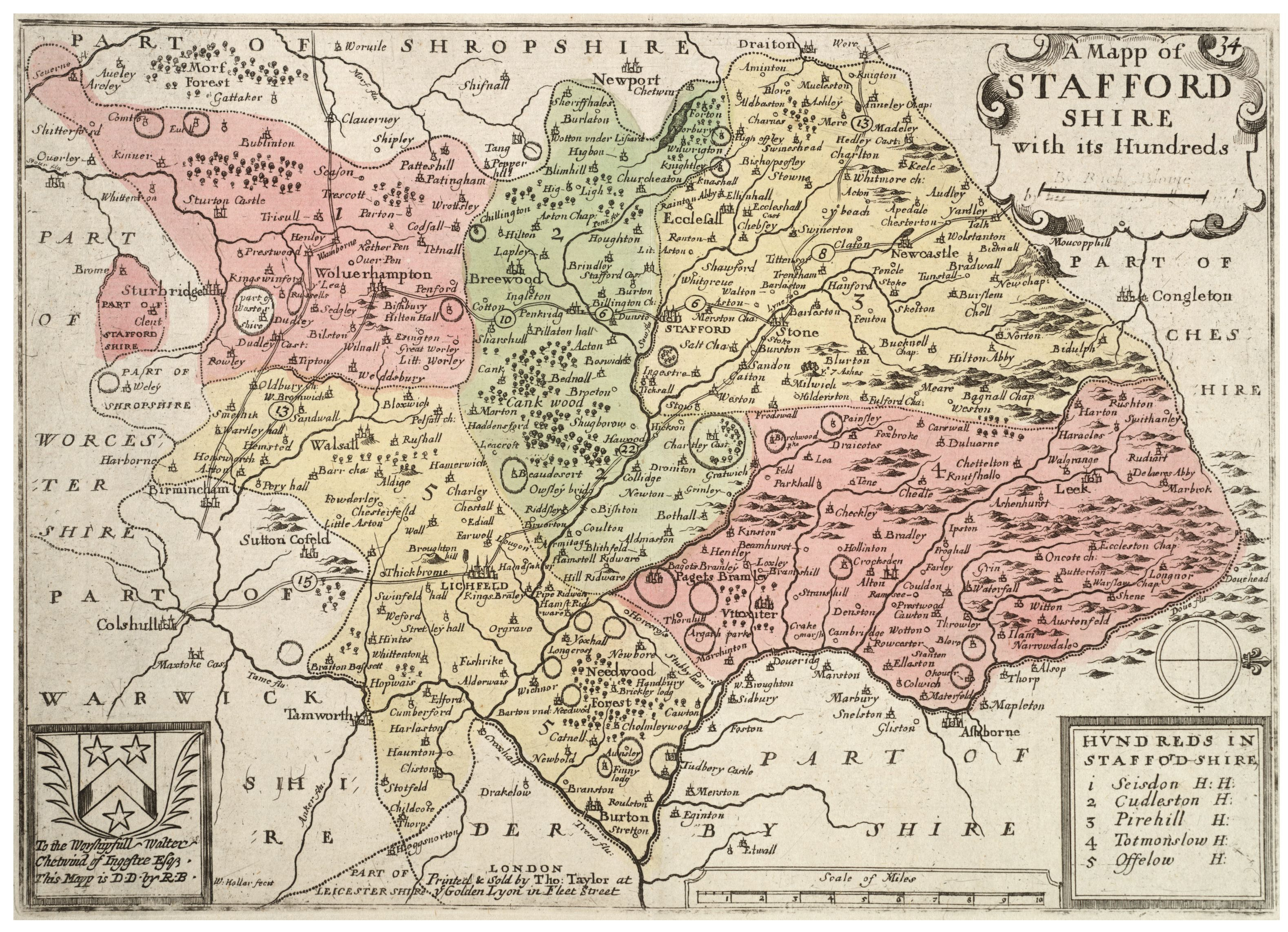
Hundreds of Staffordshire

The 10 chapelries were Elkstones, Flash, Warslow and Longnor (all in the ancient parish of Alstonefield), Calton, extending into the parishes of Blore, Croxden, Mayfield and Waterfall, Butterton (Mayfield parish), Endon, Meerbrook, Onecote and Rushton Spencer (all in the ancient parish of Leek).

== Reorganisation ==
Of the local government Districts created in the 1974 re-organisation, nearly all of Staffordshire Moorlands falls within Totmonslow Hundred, as does a substantial part of East Staffordshire including the town of Uttoxeter. The Hundred is bounded on the north-east by Derbyshire, on the south-east by Offlow Hundred, on the south and west by Pirehill Hundred, and on the north-west by Cheshire.
