= Lost houses of Staffordshire =

This is a partial list of country houses in Staffordshire that have been demolished:-

- Alton Towers. Demolished 1952.
- Beaudesert. Demolished 1936.
- Bentley Hall. Demolished 1929.
- Canwell Hall. Demolished 1950s.
- Drayton Manor. Demolished 1929.
- Elford Hall. Demolished 1964.
- Elmhurst Hall. Demolished 1921.
- Fisherwick Hall. Demolished 1808.
- Hints Hall. Demolished 1952.
- Manley Hall. Demolished 1961.
- Shenstone Court. Demolished 1930s.
- Teddesley Hall. Demolished 1954
- Tixall Hall. Demolished 1926.
- Trentham Hall. Demolished 1911.
- Wolseley Hall. Demolished 1950s/1966.
