= Cuttleston =

Hundred in Staffordshire, England

Coordinates: 52.7°N 2.1°W

- Former subdivision of England
- Cuttlestone Hundred (red) shown in Staffordshire
- History
  - Origin: Anglo-Saxon period
  - Created: 10th century
  - Abolished: 1894 (obsolete)
  - Succeeded by: various
- Status: obsolete area
- Government: Hundred
- Subdivisions
  - Type: Parishes (see text)
  - Units: Parishes

Cuttleston or Cuttlestone is a hundred in the county of Staffordshire, England, located in the centre of that county, south of Stafford.

Cuttleston was the most thinly populated and the second smallest of the five Hundreds of Staffordshire. In 1871 it had an area of 106,340 acres (43,030 ha) and a population of 35,939. It was bounded on the west by Shropshire, on the south by Seisdon Hundred, on the east by Offlow Hundred, and on the north by Pirehill Hundred. It is about 20 miles (32 km) in length and 12 miles (19 km) in breadth. In the east is Cannock Chase, an extensive heath and former royal forest. The old Forest of Brewood formed the boundary of Seisdon and Cuttleston. The Hundred was separated into the East and West Divisions, under two chief constables. It contains two market towns: Rugeley and Brewood and the market village of Penkridge. In the 19th century it comprised 17 parishes, 2 extra parochial places and 6 chapelries. These were subdivided into 36 townships.

The name is derived from the combination of the Old English words Cūþwulf (a personal name) and stān (stone). The origin of the Hundred dates from the division of his kingdom by King Alfred the Great into counties, hundreds and tithings. From the beginning, Staffordshire was divided into the hundreds of Offlow, Pirehill, Totmonslow, Cuttleston and Seisdon.

== See also ==
- Pencersaete
