= Seisdon Rural District =

Former rural district in Staffordshire, England

Coordinates: 52°33′N 2°14′W

Seisdon was a rural district in Staffordshire, England from 1894 to 1974. It lay to the west of Wolverhampton and was formed under the Local Government Act 1894 based on the Seisdon rural sanitary district.

Villages in the district included Kinver, Wombourne, Codsall, Trysull and Pattingham, as well as Seisdon itself.

In 1934, it was expanded to absorb western parts of Kingswinford Rural District, with the eastern, more urban areas of the district being absorbed into Brierley Hill Urban District. At the same time, a section of Penn was removed from Seisdon to be incorporated into the County Borough of Wolverhampton, and other parts of the district were absorbed into Tettenhall Urban District.

In 1966, the village of Gospel End was transferred into Seisdon having previously been part of Sedgley Urban District. This reorganisation saw the Sedgley and Brierley Hill urban districts abolished, with most of their territory being incorporated into an enlarged County Borough of Dudley.

It continued in existence until 1 April 1974, when it was merged with the southern part of Cannock Rural District to form the South Staffordshire district.
