= Trysull =

Village in Staffordshire, England

Coordinates: 52.54621°N 2.22006°W

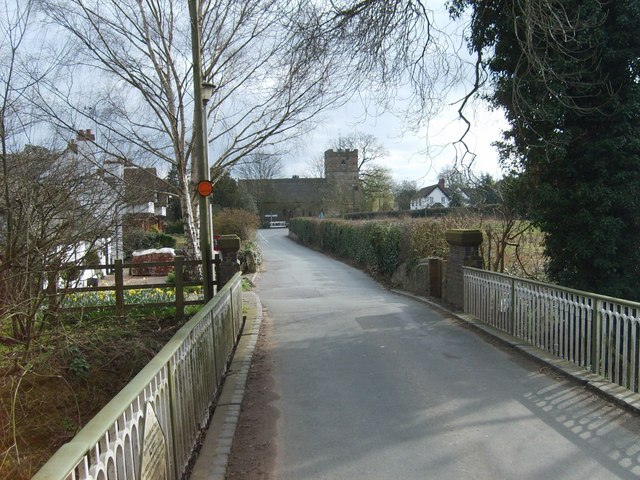
- Trysull Holloway and the bridge over Smestow Brook, looking towards the village centre

- Location within Staffordshire
- Population: 1,150 (2011 Census, inc. Seisdon)
- OS grid reference: SO851942
- District: South Staffordshire
- Shire county: Staffordshire
- Region: West Midlands
- Country: England
- Sovereign state: United Kingdom
- Post town: Wolverhampton
- Postcode district: WV5
- Dialling code: 01902
- Police: Staffordshire
- Fire: Staffordshire
- Ambulance: West Midlands
- UK Parliament: South Staffordshire
- Website: http://trysullandseisdon.co.uk

Trysull /triːˈsʊl/ is a rural village in the county of Staffordshire, England approximately five miles south-west of Wolverhampton. With the adjacent village of Seisdon, it forms the civil parish of Trysull and Seisdon, within the South Staffordshire non-metropolitan district. Until 1974 it formed part of Seisdon Rural District. The 2011 census recorded a usually resident population for the parish of Trysull & Seisdon of 1,150 persons in 455 households.

The village has not been greatly affected by over-modern development and still retains many of the old country cottages, houses and a manor house.

== Toponymy ==
In 1086 the village name appears in the Domesday Book as Treslei. One of the families who subsequently occupied the estate were styled de Tressell.

The name appears to mean "the settlement in the clearing", deriving from the Welsh prefix tre settlement and the suffix leah a woodland clearing. The next significant placename to the north is Trescott, where the suffix cott means small building or cottage.

Ogilby's strip road map c1675 shows the spelling Tressell.

Yates' map of Staffordshire, from 1775, shows the spelling Treosle.

== Topography and geology ==
The village of Trysull lies almost entirely within the shallow valley of the Smestow Brook, flanked either side by low sandstone ridges running north-south.

The Smestow itself created neither of these features: it simply flows through a landscape opened up by glaciation in the last Ice Age. A thin mantle of glacial drift covers the bedrock and consists of patches of clay, silt and pebble beds. Also present are scattered granite boulders originating either in Southern Scotland or North Wales.

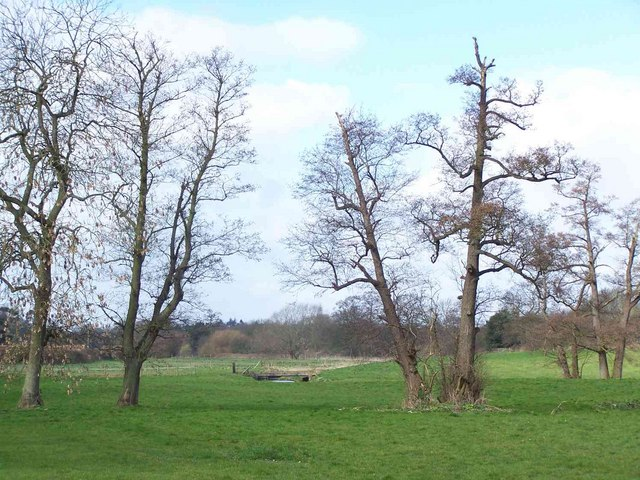
Towards Smestow Brook, flood plain

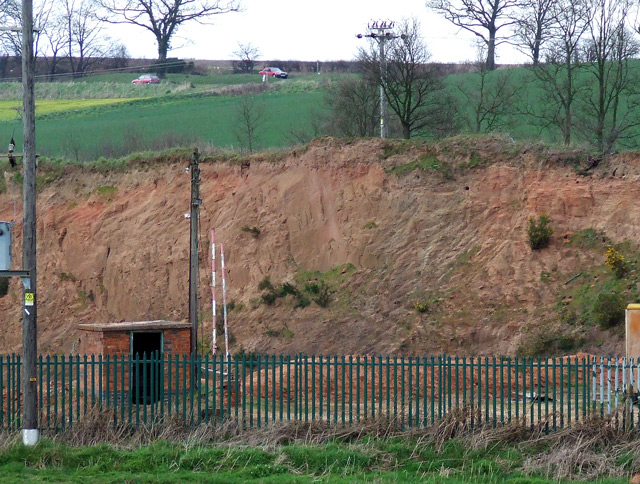
"Turbulent" Bunter sandstone face at quarry on ridge north of village

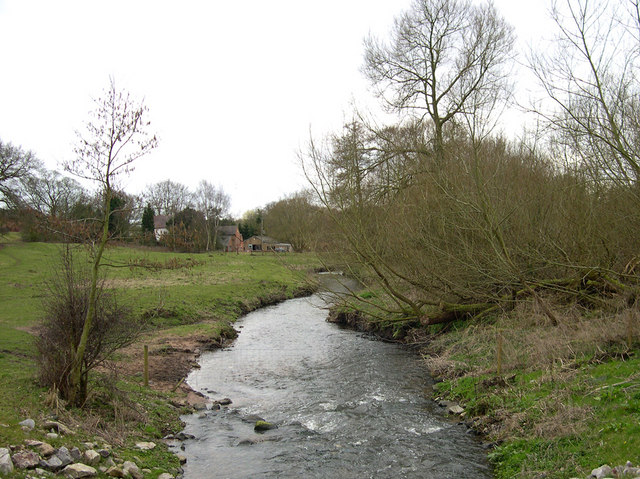
Smestow Brook

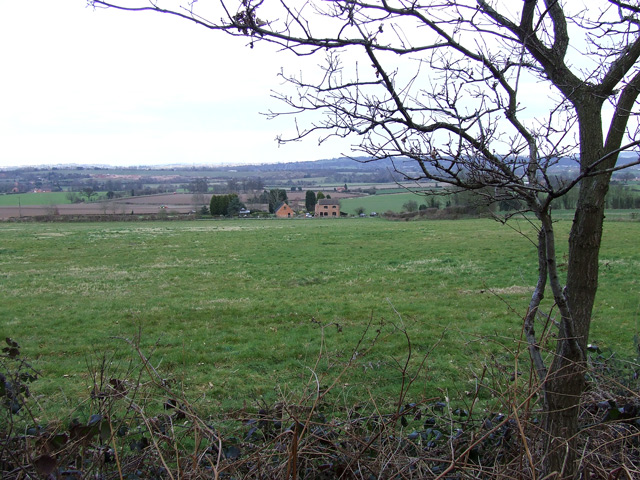
Grazing land after winter

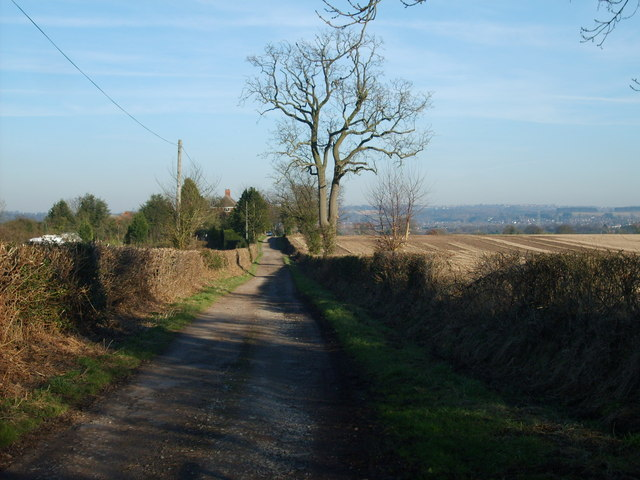
Gorse Lane

== History ==
=== Early history ===
No archaeological evidence of pre-Saxon permanent occupation has been discovered although remains of Roman origin are found only 3 miles downstrean at Greensforge and Ashwood.

The feudal estates of Trysull and the nearby village of Seisdon are Anglo-Saxon in origin and lay within the Seisdon Hundred. This administrative body met in the open, probably in the fields known as the "Musters". The estates were held by the Saxon Turgot immediately prior to the Conquest. For much of its history, as today, Trysull and Seisdon jointly formed a parish. The earliest recorded evidence for Trysull is an entry in the Domesday Book of 1086. A contemporary reworking of the original text records that:

William holds 2 hides (about 240 acres) in Trysull and Baldwin holds it from him. Tirgot held it, with full jurisdiction, he was a freeman. Land for 3 ploughs. In the estate 2 ploughs, 5 slaves, 4 villagers and 1 small holder with 2 ploughs. A mill valued at 4 shillings and 4 acres of meadow. The value was and is now 30 shillings.

Following the Norman Conquest the two estates were held "in captive" by William Fitz Ansculf and subsequently tenanted by local families. Sub-tenants were at first styled Frankley or Bradley, and later Tressell, from the name of the village. A fair and a market were granted by Henry III in 1251 to Thomas de Tressell. By 1396 the manor had passed to the Lowes, lords of Whittington (Worcestershire). By 1557 it had passed to Thomas Grey of Enville, who bought the neighbouring village of Seisdon in that year. The estate was bought by Sir Hugh Wrottesley in 1633, the ownership passed slowly into other hands, the last portion being sold in 1929.

Various mediaeval routes can still be seen in the village. Both the track, Church Lane, from Trysull to Seisdon, and the green lane track, which backs on to various properties in the village centre, have evidence of long term use. Others, like Trysull Holloway, have been built over and are in modern-day use, but both their curving routes and some historic (possibly mediaeval) stone walling systems indicate ancient origins. The indirect routes taken suggest the need to bypass long-demolished mediaeval buildings no longer visible above ground.

The open field system of farming ended in Trysull by mid-17th century following the Trysull and Seisdon Inclosure Act 1773 (13 Geo. 3. c. 103 Pr.) and the exchange of common pasture with the Vicar of Wombourne in lieu of hay tithe.

=== Turnpike ===
The road along the southern boundary of the village was operated by the Dudley and New Inn Turnpike Trust from 1790. There was a toll house, toll gate and a turnpike gatekeeper at Smestow Gate, with a side-bar to Trysull and Seisdon. The turnpike ran from Dudley, Worcestershire to New Inn, Monmouthshire. The Local Government Act 1888 gave responsibility for maintaining main roads to the Staffordshire County Council. This section of the road is now the B4176.

=== Railway ===
Large-scale Victorian industrial development largely by-passed the village. The Staffordshire & Worcestershire Canal passed about a quarter of a mile to the east of the parish boundary. However, it could have been very different if plans by the Welch and Midland Counties Junction Railways had come to fruition. In The London Gazette of 25 November 1862 a notice appeared announcing the intention to apply for an Act of Parliament to build and maintain a railway between the Shrewsbury and Hereford Railway at Craven Arms, the West Midland and South Staffordshire Railways at Dudley and Wolverhampton. Three sections of the line would have been:

No. 2. A railway, commencing in the said parish of Oldbury, from and out of the intended railway No. 1, at or near the termination of that railway, as before described, and terminating in the parish of Trysull, in the county of Stafford, at a point in the centre of the public highway leading from the Dudley and New Inn turnpike road at Smestow toll gate to Seisdon, situate 135 yards or thereabouts from the tollhouse at the said tollgate, measuring in a northerly direction along the said highway.

No. 3. A railway, commencing in the said parish of Trysull, from and out of the said intended Railway No. 2, at or near the termination of that railway as before described, and terminating in the parish of Dudley, in the county of Worcester, at or near Scot's-green, at a point in the centre of the Dudley and Brettell-lane turnpike-road, situate 33 yards or thereabouts from the weighing machine in the said road belonging to the Right Honourable the Earl of Dudley, and occupied by his lordship.

No. 7. A railway, commencing in the parish of Trysull, in the. county of Stafford, from and out of the said intended Railway No. 2, at or near the termination of that railway and the commencement of the said intended Railway No. 3, as before respectively described, and terminating in the parish of Sedgley, in the same county, by a junction with the Birmingham, Wolverhampton, and Stour Valley Railway, about 10 yards to the south-east of the point where such last-mentioned railway is carried over the turnpike-road leading from Goldthorn-hill to Bilston, and near to Ettingshall-road and Bilston Station, on such last-mentioned railway.

Similarly, the Central Wales and Staffordshire Junction Railway (1864) and the Bridgnorth, Wolverhampton and Staffordshire Railway (1865) also planned to link main line Shropshire and Black Country networks via the Smestow Valley at Trysull.

=== Mander family ===
The architectural character of the historic centre of the village was significantly influenced in the late 19th and early 20th centuries by the activities and benefaction of Benjamin Howard Mander, who bought the Manor House in 1894 and lived there until his death in 1912. His widow Lilian continued to reside in Trysull until her own death in 1952.

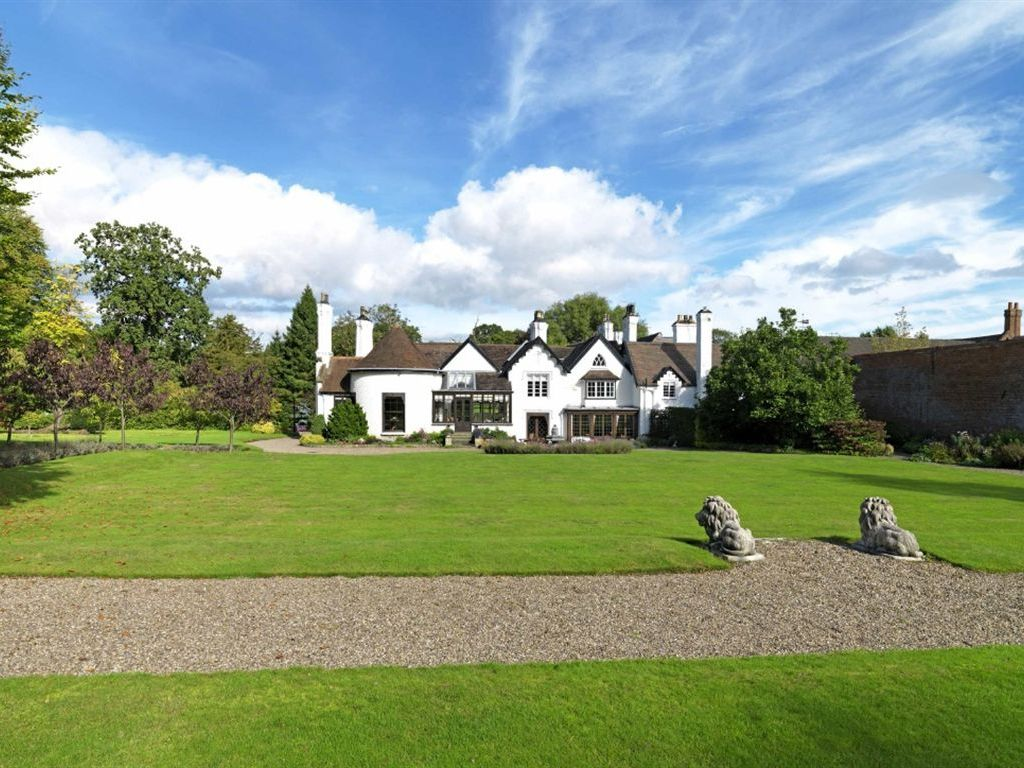
The Manor House, Seisdon Road, Trysull

The considerable wealth of the Mander family began to grow following the migration of Thomas Mander from the family’s farmland on the Warwickshire-Worcestershire border to the market town of Wolverhampton in the mid-1700s. By 1845, Mander Brothers had become a formidable industrial force in the area with a range of chemical and industrial businesses. The success of their paint and varnish business in the second half of the 19th century earned them a national reputation. The family were noted non-conformists, major philanthropists and local benefactors, and were regarded by their contemporaries as being progressive and public spirited.

The Mander family, including Howard, were strongly influenced by the Arts and Crafts movement. They were responsible for building two great Arts and Crafts houses in the area, Wightwick Manor of 1889–93 on the western edge of Wolverhampton for Theodore Mander and The Mount at Tettenhall Wood in 1891 and 1908 for Sir Charles Tertius Mander. Immediately after his purchase of Trysull Manor House in 1894, Howard Mander commenced to remodel the house, dating to 1637, employing the architect Frank Worthington Simon and transforming it into an exemplar for the Arts and Crafts movement. By 1900, or soon after, he had endowed the village with an institute (now The Thatchers) complete with a billiards room and library. It was lost to the people of the village when the deed of gift was lost or misplaced. He also built neighbouring housing along Trysull Holloway and the fine Manor Farm. He influenced the design of the new school building in 1896, although he was not its principal benefactor.

=== 20th century ===
The two 11th-century hamlets grew slowly; until prior to 1914 the parish was self-contained with a parish church, church hall, public houses, shops, a bakery, two post offices, two corn mills, blacksmiths, wheelwrights, boot and shoe makers, friendly societies, a sprinkling of professional people and a few "gentry".

There were several small charities for the relief of the poor, now merged into the Thomas Rudge Educational Trust and the Parish Charity.

The historic centre of Trysull was designated a Conservation Area in December 1969 by Staffordshire County Council. A more comprehensive study was made in December 2003 and January 2004 for South Staffordshire Council. This was published in an appraisal of the existing Conservation Area with recommendations for the future, in March 2004. After consideration and consultation a revised village Conservation Area, with its own detailed Management Plan and Appraisal was published. This was designated on 11 November 2010 and the changed boundary and Management Plan came into immediate effect. It was also felt appropriate to conjoin portions of Seisdon to the revised original areas. Both hamlets have strong historic and administrative links with their neighbour and are joined to them by a specially designated Buffer Zone.

=== Parish Church ===
The Parish Church, All Saints, is a small ancient edifice. It is known that a church has stood on the present site for over 1000 years.

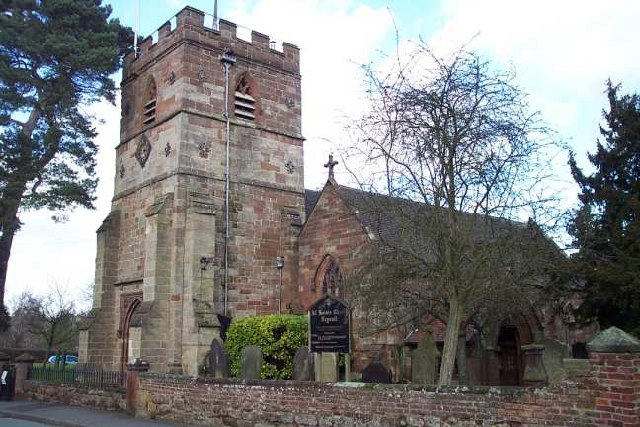
All Saints CE Parish Church, Trysull

The Tower is one of the oldest parts of the church dating from the 12th century. It was heightened and buttressed in the 15th century. The tower had extensive work undertaken on it in 1897 by specialist builders F.W. Simon of Edinburgh, to a design by the same architect that designed the school. The works included a new porch. Above the round tower arch at the west end of the nave area are The Royal Arms Of George III. Following the Restoration of the English monarchy in 1660 it was made compulsory to display the arms of the reigning monarch in all parish churches. During the 19th century the practice was discontinued.

On the outside of the north wall is an ancient doorhead, now blocked off. It is possible that it is Norman and has been re-sited when the north aisle was widened. It was in use until the late 19th century.

Notable internal features are the 13th-century font, the 15th-century piscina, the 16th-century rood screen and the Jacobean pulpit. The east window dating from 1340 has undergone some restoration. The saints in the left and right hand sections are predominantly of the original 14th-century glass. Inside the main door is a parish chest, believed to date from the late 12th century, hewn out of one tree trunk and banded with iron. It was padlocked in two places; one key was held by the priest and the other by a church warden.

The church was enlarged, and restored, in 1844, at a cost of £1,000. It had 400 sittings of which 180 were free.

The churchyard contains two Commonwealth war graves, of a Royal Field Artillery soldier of World War I and a Royal Air Force airman of World War II.

=== Woodford Grange ===
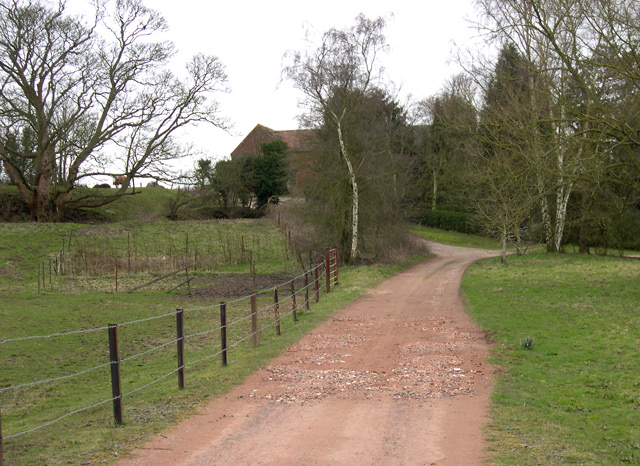
Track to Woodford Grange, building visible in distance

The mediaeval monastic farming centre at Woodford Grange was an extra-parochial area on the south-eastern edge of the village. It was a farming centre for the Cluniac priory at Dudley. In a mediaeval context the grange place name normally denotes a monastic farm. It may be that Woodford Grange was central to an estate owned by the priory, and therefore some of the fields around Trysull would have been part of that estate as well. Not much is known about the links between Trysull and Woodford Grange in the medieval period and after the Dissolution of the Monasteries. However following the introduction of the New Poor Law, extra-parochial areas were effectively made civil parishes by the Extra-Parochial Places Act 1857 (20 Vict. c. 19) and were eliminated by the Poor Law Amendment Act 1868. In the case of Woodford this would have been achieved by being integrated with the neighbouring parish of Wombourne. A surviving associated feature is Monk's Path. Woodford Grange is currently privately owned.

=== School ===
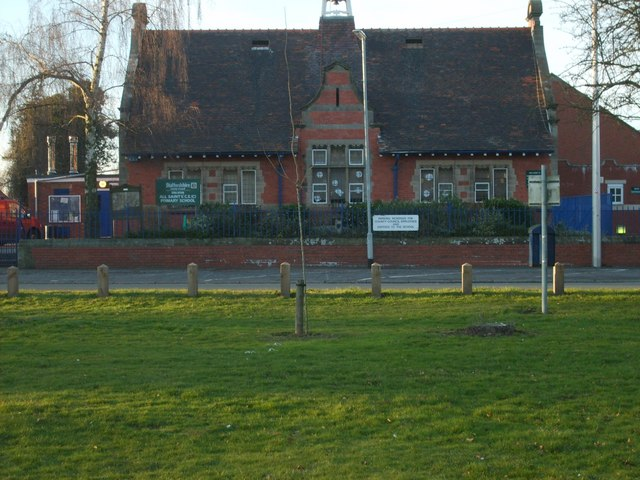
All Saints CE (VC) Primary School, the current buildings on The Green.

Trysull children had schooling as early as the 1680s although the first purpose-built schoolroom did not appear until later.

The school was originally opened in 1703 and was situated somewhere opposite the parish church. By the mid-19th century, Trysull School was the building immediately adjacent to the School House. In 1895 a severe gale blew down the main chimney, destroying part of the roof and causing other considerable damage. Using a bequest of nearly £3,000 from Eliza Baker of Bromsgrove (formerly of Seisdon), work was started on the present school building which opened in 1896, a short distance from its predecessor. The building design, commissioned by the Mander family, was carried out by noted Arts and Crafts style architect Frank Worthington Simon. Drawings are held in the RIBA Archive at the Victoria & Albert Museum.

=== The Green ===
Until the 1840s the village green was known as Bent Green. The Green is situated next to the Village Hall and opposite Woodford House, a residential nursing home.

=== Workhouse ===
The original poorhouse for Trysull was built on The Green and was in use by the 1770s but was derelict by the 1840s.

On 10 February 1859 the Birmingham Daily Post reported that "On Tuesday last, at the ordinary meeting of the Board of Guardians, Lord Wrottesley in the chair, the contract for the erection of the new workhouse for the Seisdon Union was signed. The site is on an eminence overlooking the village of Trysull. The contractor for the work is Mr. Heveningham, and it will be carried out under the superintendence of Mr. Bidlake."

The new Seisdon Poor Law Union workhouse was erected at Awbridge, to the north-east of Trysull, to accommodate 120 inmates, but with enlargement this number rose to 350. The boardroom also served as the Chamber for Seisdon Rural District Council.

After its closure in 1936, some parts of the building were used by the Ministry of Food as an egg packing station from 1942 during World War II. Mr Harris, a Bridgnorth egg wholesaler, bought the building in 1959 for his egg packing station.

The buildings were largely destroyed following a fire in 1964 leaving the ruins of the buildings that are seen today.

The Seisdon Union also opened a children’s home in Vine Cottage on the south side of The Green in 1918. In 1871 Vine Cottage had been the Vine Inn, although it is not clear how long it operated as an inn. Today, this is the residential nursing home Woodford House.

=== Mill ===
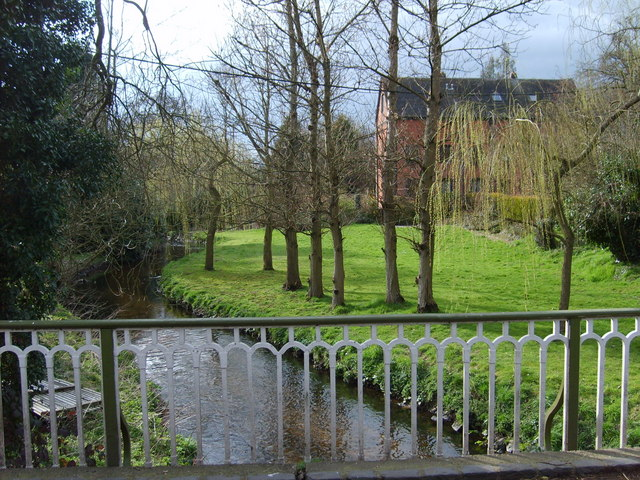
Trysull Mill View from the bridge over Smestow Brook

There is an old red-brick water mill close to the bridge over the Smestow Brook. Originally owned by Lord Wrottesley, it dates from 1854 and was one of the first buildings to feature an iron frame. It has a cast-iron water wheel with iron axle and paddles by G. and R. Turton of Kidderminster. The site also had a bakery.

The village has had a mill since Saxon times and one was recorded in the Domesday Book however this was probably located further downstream.

=== Village Hall ===
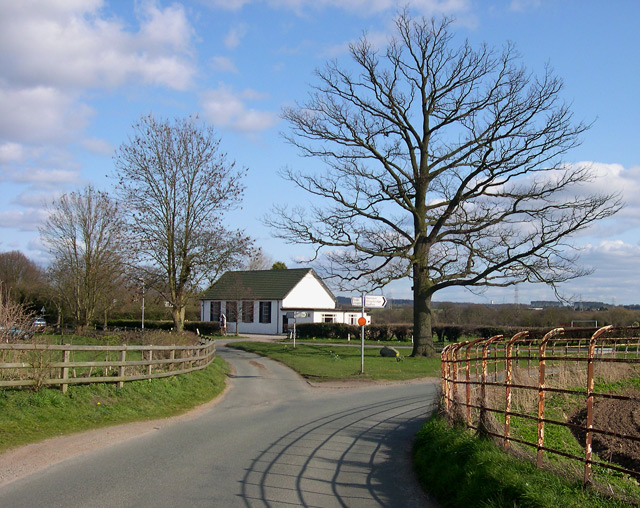
The Little Green and Village Hall

Trysull & Seisdon Village Hall was originally built for the Women’s Institute in the 1930s. The hall was leased to Trysull & Seisdon Parish Council on 18 October 1977 for a period of 99 years. Trysull & Seisdon Village hall was established as a charity by a Trust Deed dated 5 June 1984. The village hall management committee is responsible for keeping the building in a good state of repair.

By mid-2008 the Village Hall had reached a sorry, dilapidated state both inside and out. Inside it was cold, damp and an environmental nightmare costing a fortune to run. In 2009 the hall was closed for 2 months to carry out energy efficiency improvements and to extensively repair and enhance the building and site. The hall was reopened in September 2009 after repairs and improvements totalling nearly £60,000.

Adjacent to the Village Hall is the little green, a small and characterful grassed triangle formed by the junction of two roads. In the centre is a large oak tree, which as the inscription on a nearby stone attests, was planted to commemorate the coronation of King Edward VII, dated 9 August 1902, Coronation Day.

=== Playing Fields ===
The earliest sporting record is a cricket match between Trysull & Seisdon and a Bridgnorth team in 1858. There has been a cricket field in at least four locations in the parish over the years.

Founded in 1951, the Playing Fields were created to provide permanent facilities for outdoor sport, including cricket and football along with a dedicated children's playground. A cedar wood clad prefabricated pavilion was provided in the mid-1960s, erected by local volunteers. This was destroyed by fire and replaced in 1984 with a brick-built structure still in use today.

The current building was completely refurbished in 2005 and was officially re-opened on 11 June 2005 with a commemorative cricket match between Trysull & Seisdon Cricket Club and Tiverton Cricket Club (of Shropshire).

=== Industry ===
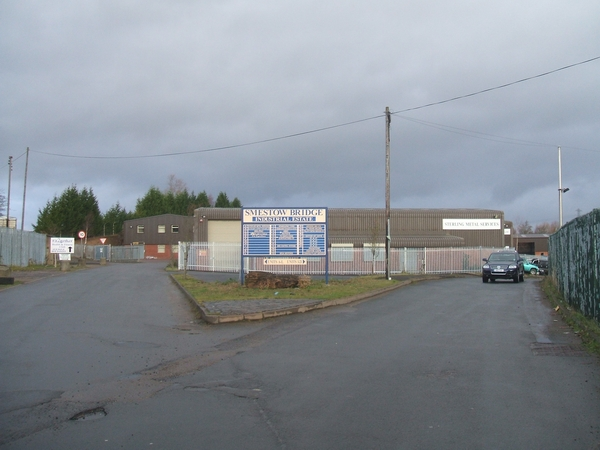
Industrial estate next to a bridge over the Smestow Brook

Sited on a sandstone ridge, north of Church Lane, lies a quarry, largely screened from the surrounding area.

At the south east boundary of the village, a spun concrete pipe works was established, owned by Norcon Ltd. Following closure this became Smestow Bridge Industrial Estate; several enterprises now operate from the site.

=== Listed buildings ===
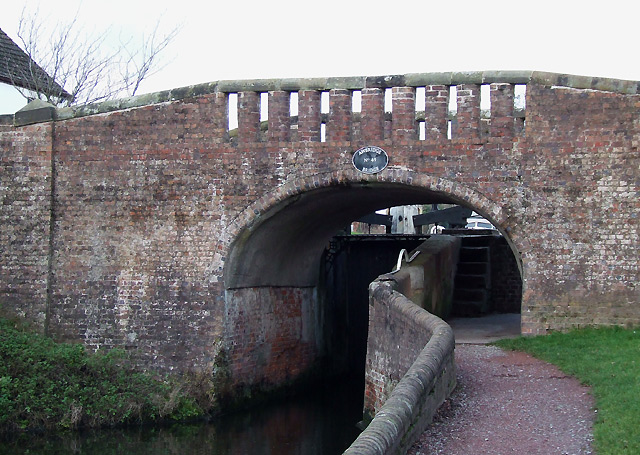
Awbridge Bridge (No 49), Staffordshire and Worcestershire Canal

- Bridge - over Smestow Brook
- Church of All Saints
- The Croft
- Four Ways
- Ketley House
- Manor Farm
- The Old Manor House
- Plough Cottage
- The Plough Inn
- Porthilly & Boddinick
- The Red House
- Rose Cottage
- Staffordshire and Worcestershire Canal Bridge Number 49 (Awbridge Bridge) and Associated Lock
- Thatchers
- Trysull Manor House and Attached Coach House and Stable Block
- Trysull Mill
- Willow Thatch

== Notable persons ==
- Sir James Marshall (1829–1889) was curate at Trysull after being ordained as an Anglican minister in 1852, later became Chief Justice of the Gold Coast, now Ghana
- Benjamin Howard Mander (1862–1912) lived at the Manor House.
- Ernest Arthur Freeman (1900–1975), consultant orthopaedic surgeon at The Royal Hospital in Wolverhampton. With his colleague, Joseph Harold Sheldon, he described distal arthrogryposis type 2A also called Freeman–Sheldon syndrome in 1938. Freeman lived at The Croft in the village.
- Dr Tom Emmerson (1909–1981), head of GKN's research laboratories in Wolverhampton, lived at Highfields, as did his son Simon (born 1950) an electroacoustic music composer working mostly with live electronics.
- Charles Borrett (1916–2000) Rural Dean of Trysull (1958–1971) and Archdeacon of Stoke-on-Trent (1956–1970).
- David Tustin (born 1935) Rural Dean of Trysull 1976–1979 and Suffragan Bishop of Grimsby (1979–2000).

== Local walks ==
Published local walks include:

- A Circular walk around Awbridge & Trysull
- Discover Winemaking in Trysull.

== Location grid ==
The above grid is based on exact directions rather than close to.

== See also ==
- Listed buildings in Trysull and Seisdon
