= Packington Hall, Staffordshire =

Country house in Staffordshire, England

Coordinates: 52.6542°N 1.7608°W

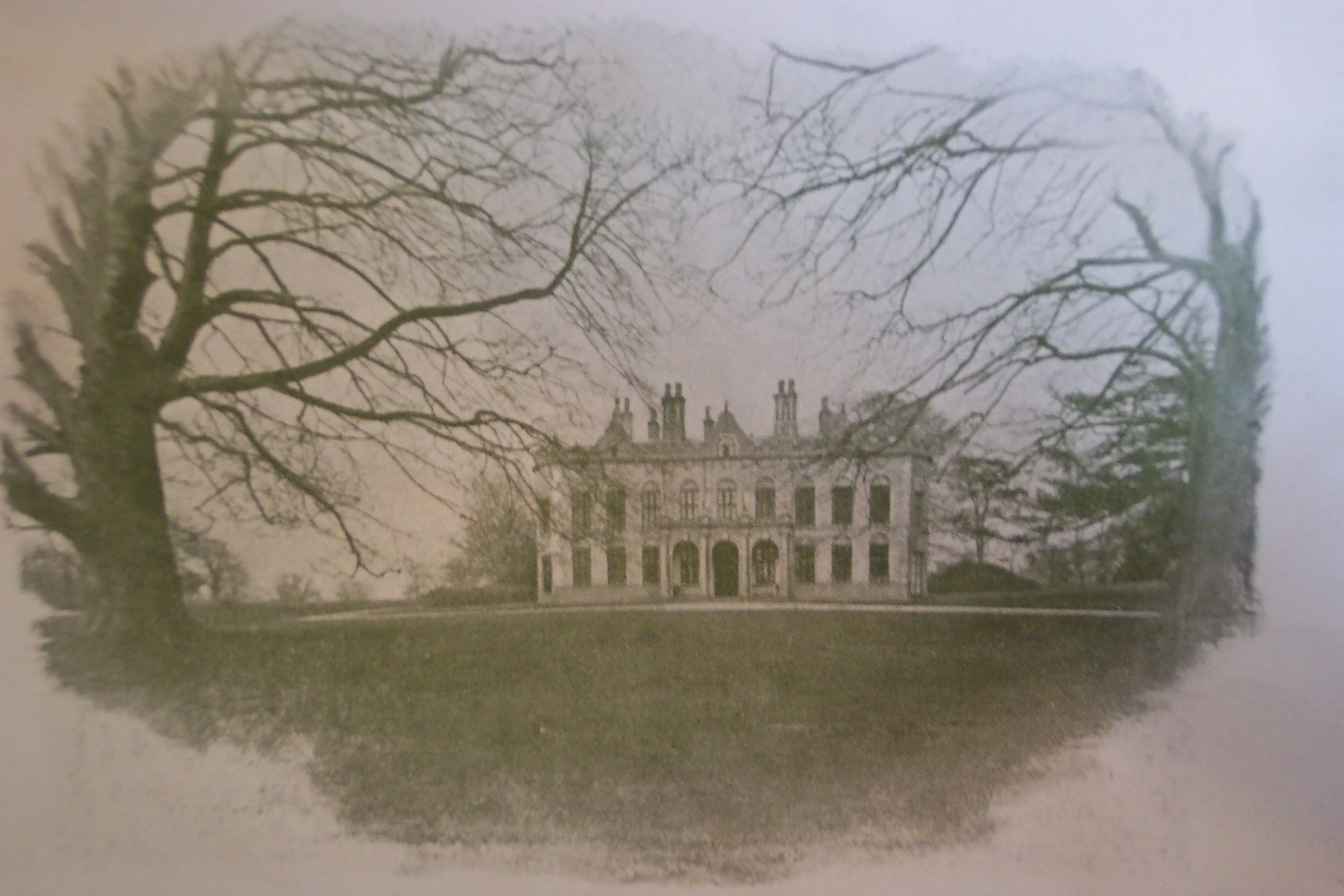
Packington Hall, Staffordshire, home of the Levett family. Photograph c. 1900

Packington Hall (grid reference SK163063) in Staffordshire was an English country house designed by architect James Wyatt in the 18th century. Originally built for the Babington family, it became the home of the Levett family of Wychnor Hall, in that same county, until the first half of the twentieth century. The Levetts had ties to Whittington, Staffordshire and nearby Hopwas for many years.

== History ==
Packington Hall, approximately two miles from Lichfield, was likely built for Zachary Babington whose daughter Mary Babington married Theophilus Levett, town clerk of Lichfield. It was passed down through family members including the Rev. Thomas Levett, vicar of Whittington.

Packington Hall passed to a junior branch of the Levett family of Wychnor Hall; Robert Thomas Kennedy Levett's elder brother, Theophilus John Levett, inherited Wychnor. Members of the family served as High Sheriff of Staffordshire. The several Levett byways in Lichfield are named for the family.

The last member of the Levett family to reside at Packington Hall was Rev. Thomas Prinsep Levett, son of Col. Robert Thomas Kennedy Levett, and graduate of Clare College, Cambridge, and a long-serving clergyman at Richmond, North Yorkshire and Selby Abbey. Rev. Thomas P. Levett died at Frenchgate, Richmond, in 1938. Although two younger brothers outlived him, Packington Hall was sold to the Bowden cable manufacturing company CTP Gills Ltd., which manufactures parts for automotive companies. The company occupied the home in the 1940s when its factory in Birmingham was bombed. CTP Gills was sold in 2006 to Suprajit, an Indian engineering firm. In 2007 Gills Cables Ltd vacated the property and moved to a smaller factory in Tamworth. The Hall has since been converted into apartments.

== See also ==
- Listed buildings in Swinfen and Packington
