= Offlow =

Hundred in Staffordshire, England

- Former subdivision of England
- Offlow Hundred (red) shown in Staffordshire
- History
  - Origin: Anglo-Saxon period
  - Created: 10th century
  - Abolished: 1894 (obsolete)
  - Succeeded by: various
- Status: obsolete area
- Government: Hundred
- Subdivisions
  - Type: Parishes (see text)
  - Units: Parishes

Offlow is a hundred in the county of Staffordshire, England, located in the south-east of that county. It is named after a tumulus or mound in the parish of Swinfen and Packington, 2 1/2 miles south of Lichfield. The hundred is recorded in the Domesday Book under the name "Offelav".

== Derivation of name ==
Offlow tumulus in parish of Swinfen and Packington,2½ miles south of Lichfield.

The name of the hundred derives from Old English Offa, a personal name and hlaw meaning 'hill' or 'mound'. A large number of Hundred names refer to hills or mounds. Some of these at least are very conspicuous hills, which afford a commanding view of the countryside for miles around. It seems likely that such sites were chosen as hundred meeting places being remote and where interference was most easily avoided. In the case of Offlow, it is a small hill rising to 367 ft. (112 metres), centrally placed in the hundred. The hill is now used for a radio mast., rather than a hundred meeting place.

== History ==
The origin of the hundred dates from the division of his kingdom by King Alfred the Great into counties, hundreds and tithings. From the beginning, Staffordshire was divided into the hundreds of Offlow, Pirehill, Totmonslow, Cuttleston and Seisdon.

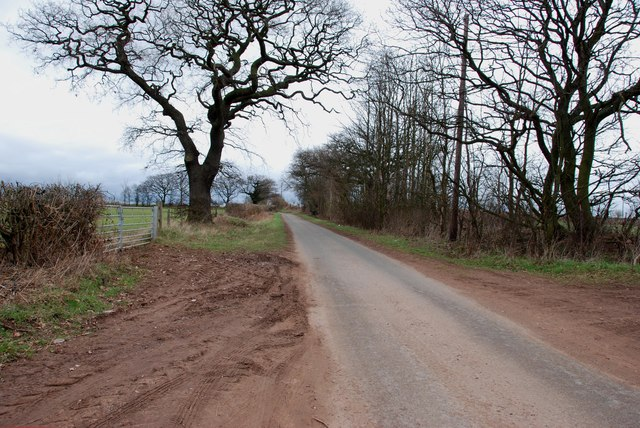
Looking north towards Offlow hill

Lichfield left the jurisdiction of Staffordshire, and Offlow Hundred, when the city was created a county separate from Staffordshire by a charter granted by Mary I of England in 1553, which came into effect with the election of its own Sheriff in December that year.

In the 19th century Offlow was the largest in population of the five hundreds of Staffordshire, with a population in 1871 of 250,790 excluding parliamentary boroughs or 299,588 including them, representing 35% of the county.

The importance of the hundreds declined from the 17th century, and most of their functions were extinguished with the establishment of county courts in 1867. In 1894 the hundred was made obsolete with the establishment of urban districts and rural districts in Staffordshire.

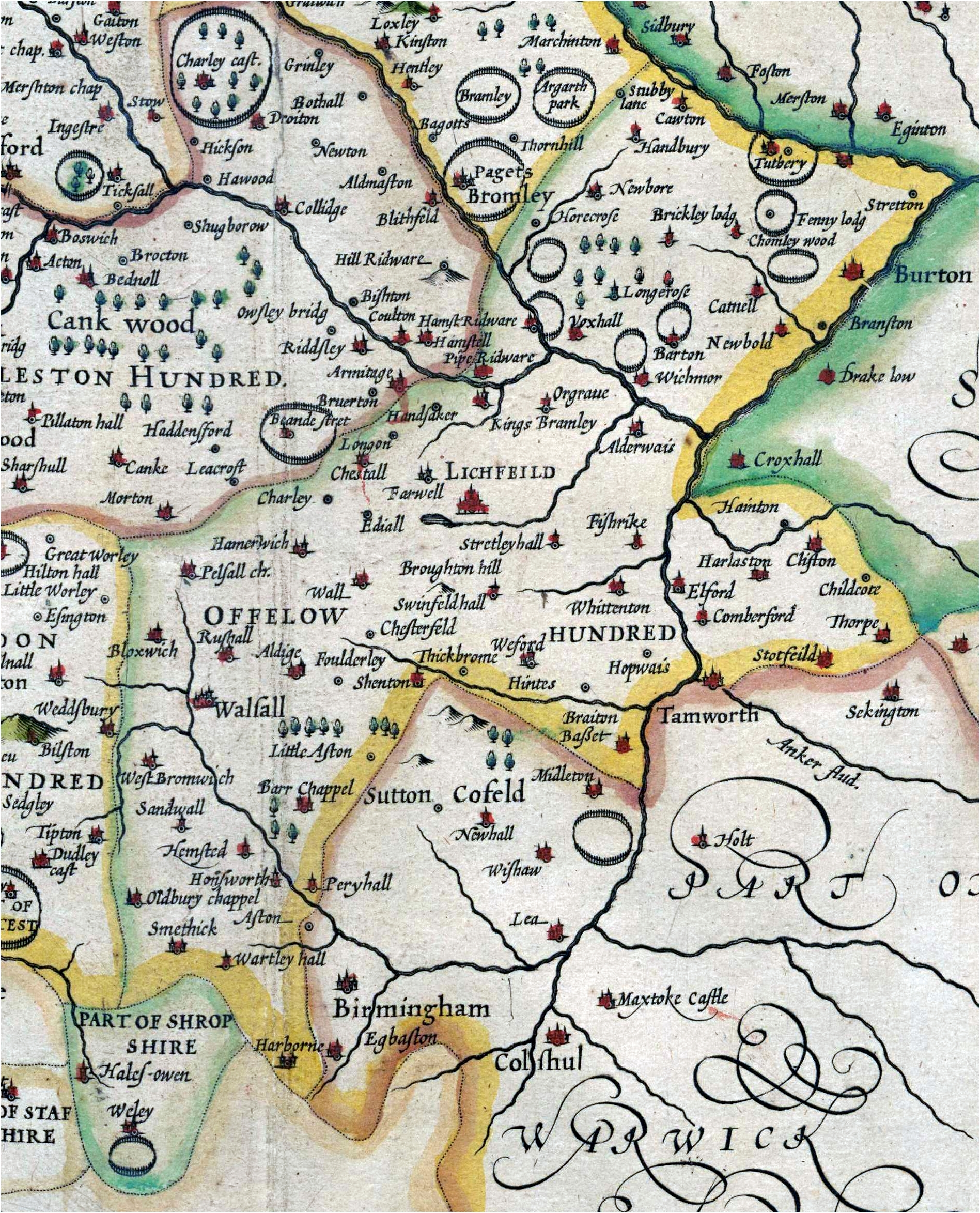
Offlow Hundred in 1610

== Divisions ==
The hundred was divided into two divisions Offlow North and Offlow South. The area of Offlow North was 75,080 acres and the area of Offlow South was 95,640 acres.

According to the archives in the Staffordshire Record Office, the subdivision of the hundred dates back to the 17th century.

When the Stafford county parliamentary constituency was divided into a North Division and a South Division by the Reform Act 1832, Offlow North and South were allocated to the North and South county divisions respectively.

In 1839 the Staffordshire magistrates decided to adopt the County Police Act 1839 for the southern division of Offlow South.

== Geography ==
Offlow contained following local government units:

Offlow North

Alrewas	Parish
Fradley	Township
Orgreave	Township
Alrewas Hays	Extra-parochial
Burton Upon Trent (part)	Parish
Branston	Township
Burton Extra	Township
Horninglow	Township
Stretton	Township
Clifton Campville (part)	Parish
Harlaston	Chapelry
Haunton	Township
Croxall (part)	Parish
Oakley	Township
Edingale	Parish
Freeford	Extra-parochial
Hamstall Ridware	Parish
Hanbury	Parish
Coton|Township
Draycott in the Clay	Township
Fauld	Township
Marchington	Chapelry
Marchington Woodlands	Township
Newborough	Chapelry
Haselour	Extra-parochial
Kings Bromley	Parish
Lichfield St Chad (part)	Parish
Curborough and Elmhurst	Township
Lichfield St Michael (part)	Parish
Fisherwick	Township
Streethay	Township
Mavesyn Ridware	Parish
Pipe Ridware	Parish
Rolleston	Parish
Anslow	Township
Scropton (part)	Parish
Tamhorn	Extra-parochial
Tamworth (part)	Parish
Syerscote	Township
Tatenhill	Parish
Barton-under-Needwood	Chapelry
Dunstall	Township
Wychnor	Chapelry
Thorpe Constantine	Parish
Tutbury	Parish
Whittington	Parish
Yoxall	Parish

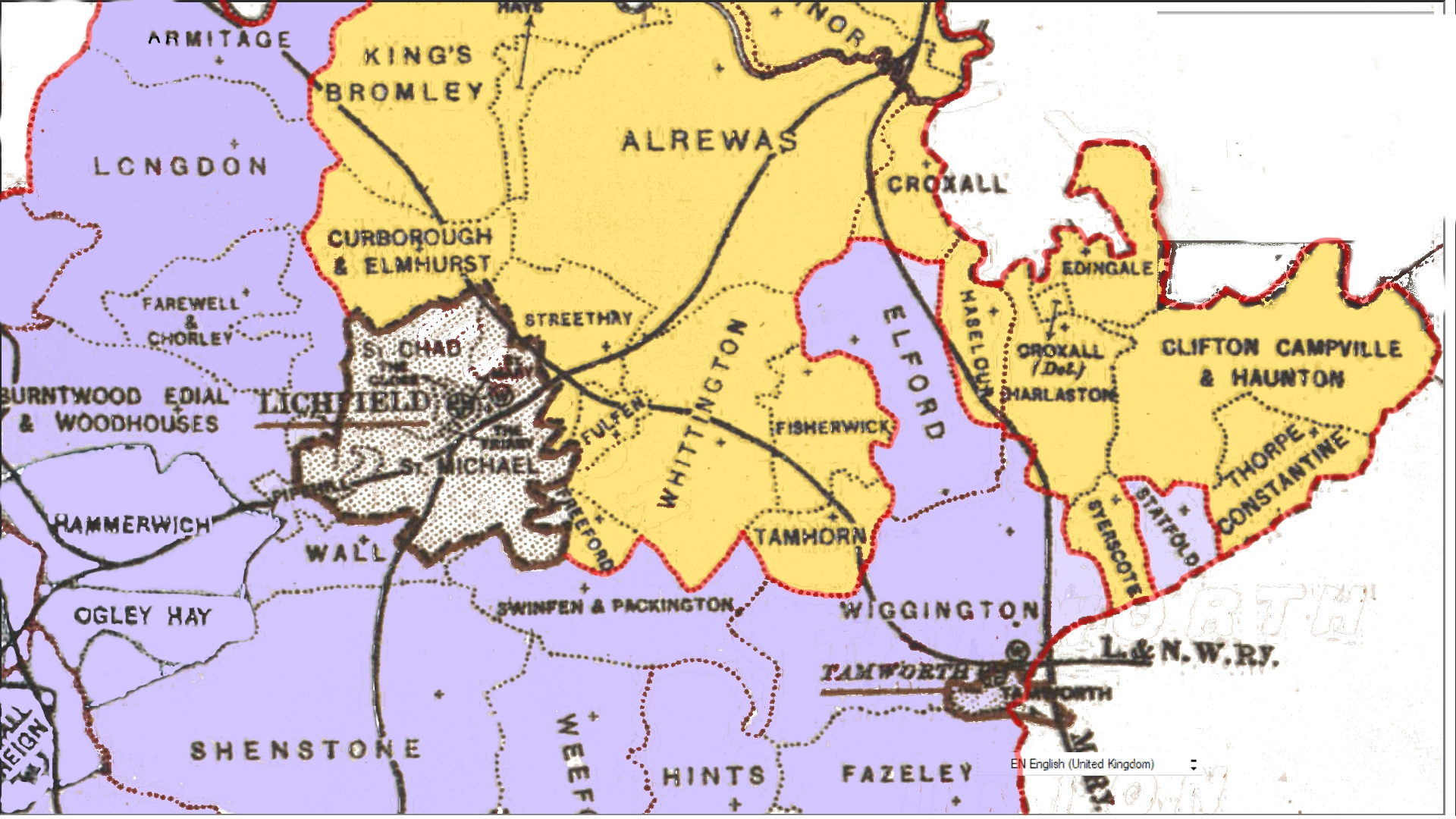
Extent of Offlow North and South in the Lichfield area (19th C) Orange:Offlow North, Mauve:Offlow South, Brown:County of the City of Lichfield - outside Offlow

Offlow South

Aldridge	Parish
Great Barr	Township
Armitage	Parish
Canwell	Extra-parochial
Darlaston	Parish
Drayton Bassett	Parish
Elford	Parish
Farewell and Chorley	Parish
Handsworth	Parish
Perry Bar	Township
Harborne	Parish
Smethwick	Chapelry
Hints	Parish
Hopwas Hays	Extra-parochial
Lichfield St Mary	Parish
Lichfield St Michael (part)	Parish
Burntwood	Chapelry
Hammerwich	Chapelry
Pipehill (part)	Township
Wall	Township
Longdon	Parish
Norton Canes	Parish
Ogley Hay	Extra-parochial
Rushall	Parish
Shenstone	Parish
Statfold	Parish
Tamworth (part)	Parish
Fazeley	Township
Wigginton	Chapelry
Tipton	Parish
Walsall	Parish
Walsall Borough	Township
Walsall Foreign	Township
Wednesbury	Parish
Weeford	Parish
Swinfen and Packington	Hamlets
West Bromwich	Parish
Wolverhampton (part)	Parish
Bentley	Township
Pelsall	Chapelry
Wednesfield	Chapelry
Willenhall	Chapelry

Statfold, although classed in Offlow South, was separated from it by intervening parts of the Offlow North.

Offlow Hundred (19th century)

In all, the Hundred comprised 38 parishes and 7 extra parochial places, containing within them around a hundred townships and hamlets (some being chapelries). For example, Swinfen and Packington were hamlets of the ancient parish of Weeford. In addition to the above, Offlow included 4 townships belonging Wolverhampton Parish and several hamlets and townships belonging to the Lichfield parishes of St. Mary and St.Chad, outside the bounds of the City and County of Lichfield.

Offlow Hundred consists of south-east Staffordshire extending from the River Dove to the environs of Birmingham and Wolverhampton. The north is more agricultural while the south has the manufacturing districts, with Walsall, Wednesbury and West Bromwich.

Its length from north to south is about 30 miles, and its average breadth from eight to twelve miles. It is bounded on the north and north-east by Derbyshire, on the south and south-east by Warwickshire, and on the west by the other four hundreds of Staffordshire. From north to south these are Totmonslow, Pirehill, Cuttleston and Seisdon.

It has extensive plains, broken only by gentle undulations, except on its southern and western borders, where some of the hills rise rather abruptly. The lowlands in the valleys of the Trent, Tame, and Dove have been frequently inundated by these rivers, to form rich pastures, celebrated for cattle, and the production of cheese.

The market towns within the hundred are Burton-upon-Trent (Burton-on-Trent parish had three other townships in Derbyshire), Tamworth(Tamworth borough was partly in Warwickshire, in which county it had 4 townships), Walsall, Wednesbury, and Lichfield, but the latter formed a county of itself, though locally situated in the centre of Offlow.

== Hundred Court ==
The Hundred Court of Offlow was a hundred court at common law, rather than one bestowed with powers by a special statute. It had the same jurisdiction and process as the county court except that the defendant had to reside in the hundred. Most of these common law hundred courts had grown much out of use by the 19th century, but the court was still fully active in the Hundred of Offlow. However, the Hundred Court of Offlow was abolished in 1852 and its functions transferred to the county court.

The court was held in Walsall, before a steward appointed by the High Sheriff of Staffordshire, at the old Town Hall building.

== Current local government ==
The current local government arrangements in Staffordshire were created in 1974 under the Local Government Act 1972. Offlow Hundred comprises the present districts of Lichfield (except for the parish of Colton and the inner part of the city of Lichfield that was formerly a separate county), Tamworth (Staffordshire part), Sandwell and Walsall. Also the eastern half of East Staffordshire including the town of Burton on Trent.

== See also ==
- Tomsaete
