= Swinfen and Packington =

- Civil parish
- Interactive map of Swinfen and Packington
- Coordinates: 52°39′N 1°47′W
- Country: England
- Primary council: Lichfield
- County: Staffordshire
- Region: West Midlands
- Status: Parish

Government
  - Type: Parish Council
  - UK Parliament: Tamworth

Swinfen and Packington is a civil parish in Lichfield District, Staffordshire, England. The parish was formed in 1934 by division from Weeford. The parish includes the hamlet of Swinfen, and contains several listed buildings, including Packington Hall.

== See also ==
- Listed buildings in Swinfen and Packington
