= Swinfen Hall =

Country mansion in Lichfield, England

Coordinates: 52°39′4″N 1°48′9″W

Grundy's Name Act 1748
- Act of Parliament
- Parliament of Great Britain
- Long title: An Act to enable Samuel Grundy (now called Samuel Swinfen) and the Heirs Male of his Body to take and use the Surname and Arms of Swinfen.
- Citation: 22 Geo. 2. c. 3 Pr.
- Territorial extent: Great Britain

Dates
- Royal assent: 16 February 1749
- Commencement: 29 November 1748 (Note: Start of session.)
Other legislation
Relates to	Thomas Grundy's Name Act 1771

Status: Current legislation

Thomas Grundy's Name Act 1771
- Act of Parliament
- Parliament of Great Britain
- Long title: An Act to enable Thomas Grundy, and his Issue Male, to take and use the Surname of Swinsen.
- Citation: 11 Geo. 3. c. 26 Pr.
- Territorial extent: Great Britain

Dates
- Royal assent: 8 March 1771
- Commencement: 13 November 1770
Other legislation
Relates to	Grundy's Name Act 1748

Status: Current legislation

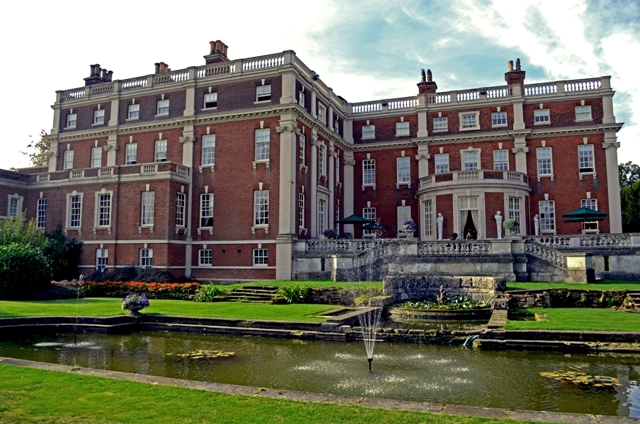

Swinfen Hall is an 18th-century country mansion house, now converted into a hotel, situated at Swinfen, in the Lichfield district of Staffordshire in England. It is a Grade II* listed building.

Swinfen Hall in 1900

The hall was built in 1757 by Samuel Swynfen to a design by architect Benjamin Wyatt (father of James Wyatt), and remained the home of the Swinfen and Swinfen Broun families for almost two hundred years.

Samuel Swynfen (of Swynfen) sold Swinfen Hall to his kinsman, Samuel Swinfen of Walbrook House. The latter died without any children, and left his estate in his will to his nephew Samuel Grundy (the son of his sister Anne, who had married Thomas Grundy of Appleby, Leicestershire) — on the condition that he take the surname of Swinfen and procure an act of Parliament to that effect. Samuel Grundy (now Swinfen) duly changed his name by a private act of Parliament, Grundy's Name Act 1748 (22 Geo. 2. c. 3 Pr.).

However, in 1770, Samuel Swinfen also died without children and the Hall passed to his brother, Thomas Grundy, who also then changed his name to Swinfen, by another private act of Parliament, Thomas Grundy's Name Act 1771 (11 Geo. 3. c. 26 Pr.).

Thomas Grundy (now Swinfen) was the grandfather of Samuel Swynfen whose will was contested in a series of trials from 1856 to 1864 and raised important questions of ethics in the legal profession.

The hall was extended and improved in the early 20th century by Lieutenant-Colonel Michael Swinfen-Broun. On his death in 1948, the estate was bequeathed to the Church and City of Lichfield, and most of the land was sold off. The hall stood unoccupied for many years until acquired in 1987 by the present owners and converted to a hotel. Since 2024, the hotel has closed.

== See also ==
- Grade II* listed buildings in Lichfield (district)
- Listed buildings in Swinfen and Packington
