= Swinfen =

Coordinates: 52°39′16″N 1°48′34″W

- Location within Staffordshire
- Civil parish: Swinfen and Packington
- District: Lichfield
- Shire county: Staffordshire
- Region: West Midlands
- Country: England
- Sovereign state: United Kingdom
- Post town: LICHFIELD
- Postcode district: WS14
- Dialling code: 01543
- Police: Staffordshire
- Fire: Staffordshire
- Ambulance: West Midlands
- UK Parliament: Lichfield

Swinfen is a small community about two miles south of Lichfield in the civil parish of Swinfen and Packington, Staffordshire.

The first known reference to Swinfen is in an Anglo-Saxon charter in 950. It is also mentioned in the Domesday Book of 1086, when the Manor was held by the Bishop of Lichfield.

The present building known as Swinfen Hall Hotel was built as the Manor House in 1757. In 2024, unauthorised works at the listed Swinfen Hall were stopped by planning officers.

Swinfen Hall Prison complete with staff accommodation, and a country craft centre, stands adjacent to the entrance to Swinfen Hall Hotel. The category C institution holds around 600 inmates.

== See also ==
- Listed buildings in Swinfen and Packington
