= Seisdon =

Village in Staffordshire, England

Coordinates: 52.5529°N 2.2398°W

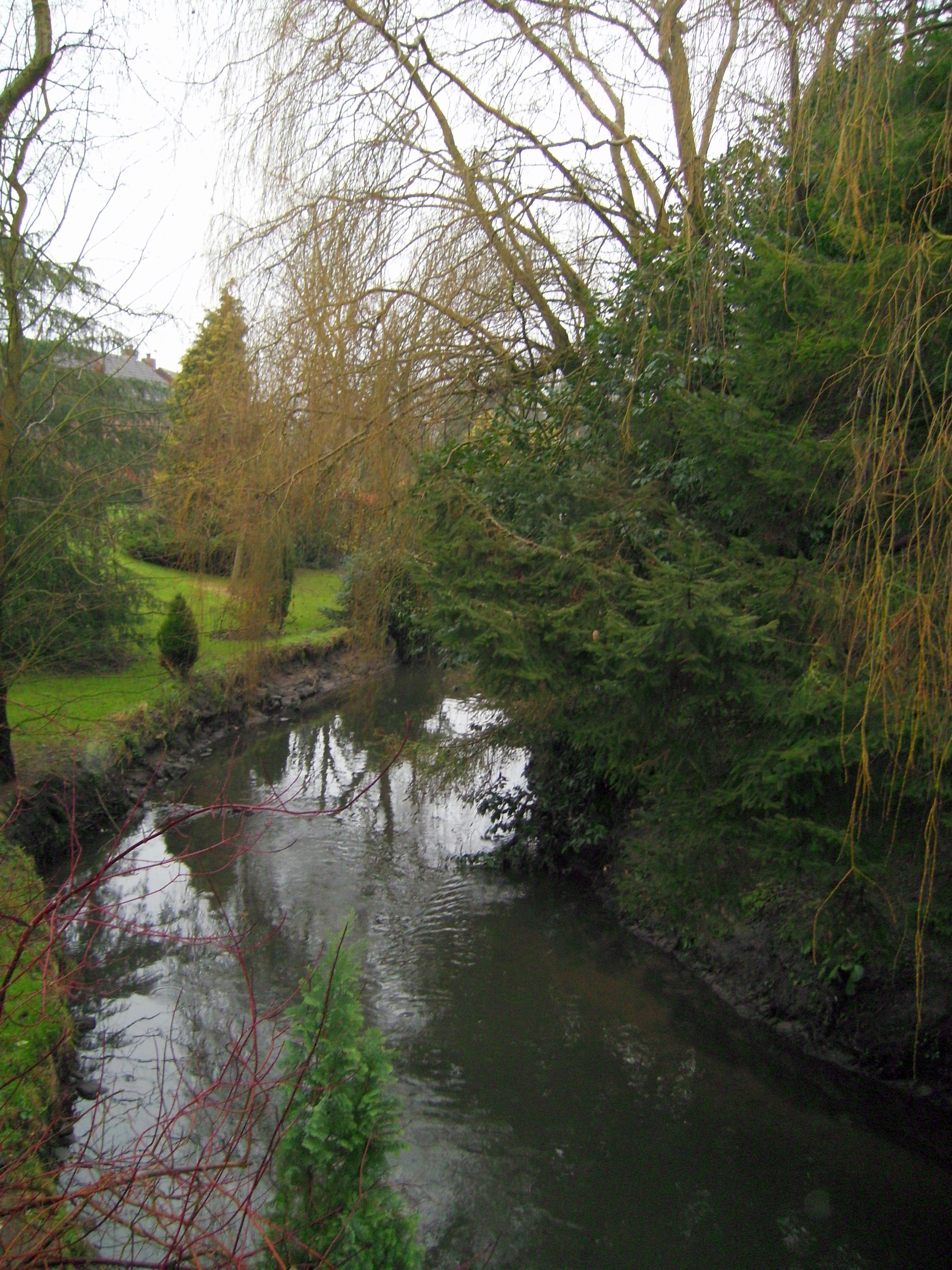
- The Smestow Brook at Seisdon

- Location within Staffordshire
- OS grid reference: SO838950
- District: South Staffordshire
- Shire county: Staffordshire
- Region: West Midlands
- Country: England
- Sovereign state: United Kingdom
- Post town: Wolverhampton
- Postcode district: WV5
- Dialling code: 01902
- Police: Staffordshire
- Fire: Staffordshire
- Ambulance: West Midlands
- UK Parliament: Kingswinford and South Staffordshire

Seisdon is a rural village in the parish of Trysull and Seisdon, Staffordshire approximately six miles west of Wolverhampton and the name of one of the five hundreds of Staffordshire. The population recorded at the 2011 census does not distinguish this hamlet from the rest of the parish, which had a population of 1,150.

== Etymology ==
The name appears to mean "hill of the Saxons", deriving from the Anglo-Saxon words Seis meaning Saxon and Dun meaning hill. The first element may alternatively be a personal name.

== Location and Sites ==
Seisdon is a hamlet within the parish of Trysull and Seisdon (formerly named Trysull, only), lying one mile north-west of the village of Trysull, near the border with Shropshire. There is a narrow bridge of several arches over the river Smestow, which is of 18th-century origin. On the county boundary there is a high position which formed an ancient entrenchment named Abbot's Wood (Apewood) Castle.

Seisdon Hall is a grade II Listed Building dating from the 17th century and greatly extended around 1840-1850 by the Aston-Pudset family. It was previously known as Green Farm.

== History ==
The hamlet is remarkable for giving the name to the Hundred, for which no adequate authority can now be adduced. However, a large number of Hundred names refer to hills or mounds. It seems likely that such sites were chosen as being remote, and where interference was most easily avoided. Place-name evidence suggests a fairly early Anglo-Saxon origin for the name. Certainly the village of Seisdon was of sufficient importance prior to the Norman Conquest of 1066 to have its owners and value recorded in the Domesday Book of 1086. Having been held by four English free men before the conquest, it came into the hands of William Fitz-Ansculf who held 600 acres in Seisdon and also land in Trysull and other parts of the parish.

Almost all of its residents were originally employed in the agricultural industry.

== Seisdon Hundred ==
Each hundred was formed to support a military unit. Seisdon Hundred contains the smallest area of the five hundreds of Staffordshire, but it has a relatively high population density and agricultural productivity. It formed the south-western portion of the county, bounded on the west by Shropshire, on the south by Worcestershire, on the east by Offlow Hundred, and on the north by Cuttleston Hundred. The old Forest of Brewood formed the boundary of Seisdon and Cuttleston.

Seisdon Hundred was divided into North and South Divisions. each with their own High Constable.

The Hundred contained Wolverhampton, the largest town of the county, and many populous villages, which were constituted into 18 parishes, part of two others and two extra parochial areas. Wolverhampton parish contained several townships some of which were in Offlow Hundred. The parishes in 1834 were as follows:

Seisdon Hundred showing location of Seisdon

Parishes in Seisdon Hundred
Bobbington (partly in Shropshire)
Broome
Bushbury
Clent
Codsall
Enville
Himley
Kingswinford
Kinver
Old Swinford (incl Amblecote)
Patshull
Pattingham (partly in Shropshire)
Penn
Rowley Regis
Sedgley
Tettenhall
Trysull (and Seisdon)
Upper Arley (Over Arley)
Wolverhampton
Wombourn
Woodford (Extra Parochial)

The Hundred presented a great diversity of soil and scenery. It was rich in coal, ironstone, lime, and freestone, and renowned for its extensive mines and iron works, and for the manufacture of a great variety of articles in iron, steel, and other metals.

There was a Seisdon Rural District from 1894 to 1974.

== Famous people ==
- Mark Speight (born 1965 in Seisdon – 2008), Television presenter and actor.

== See also ==
- Trysull
- Seisdon Rural District
- Listed buildings in Trysull and Seisdon
