= Holcroft =

Holcroft is a surname. Notable people with the surname include:

- Bert Holcroft (born 1935), English rugby player, coach and writer
- Charles Holcroft (disambiguation), several people
- Edward Holcroft (born 1987), English actor
- Fanny Margaretta Holcroft (1780–1844), writer
- Francis Holcroft (1629?–1693), English minister
- George Holcroft (1856–1951), English mine owner and baronet
- Harold Holcroft (1882–1973), English railway engineer
  - Holcroft valve gear
- Henry Holcroft (1586–1650), English politician
- John Holcroft (disambiguation), several people
- M. H. Holcroft (1902-1993), New Zealand essayist and novelist
- Patrick Holcroft (born 1948), English soldier and banker
- Peter Holcroft (1931-2009), 3rd baronet
- Rosemary Charlotte Holcroft (1942-2000), South African botanical illustrator
- Sam Holcroft, British playwright
- Thomas Holcroft (disambiguation), several people
- Holcroft Blood (c. 1660 – 1707), Anglo-Irish soldier
- Phoebe Holcroft Watson (1898-1980), British tennis player

== Fictional characters ==
- Mudie Holcroft, a fictional character from Mobile Suit Gundam SEED C.E. 73: Stargazer

== See also ==
- Holcroft baronets
- Mount Holcroft, Canada
- The Holcroft Covenant, a 1978 novel by Robert Ludlum
- The Holcroft Covenant (film), a 1985 thriller
