= Coal mining in the Black Country =

Coal mining played an important part in the history of the Black Country area immediately west of Birmingham, England. It was the basis for the area's industrial development in the nineteenth century; without coal there was insufficient power. Commentators spoke of the Black Country as a great coalfield, and of the earth turned inside out by all the mining activity. Most of the mines were not large scale, but small rough and ready pits similar to the Racecourse Colliery exhibit at the Black Country Living Museum. There were as many as five or six hundred small pits like this exploiting the seams of the South Staffordshire coalfield.

== Early history ==
Coal mining in the area on a small scale dates back to medieval times. Until the seventeenth century coal was commonly extracted from open-workings on outcrops where the coal seam was near to the surface. One of the last places to utilise this method was in Wednesbury. The eighteenth century saw open-cast coal mining replaced by underground pits. Pits of this era had a depth of between 25 and 60 feet; shallow compared to later workings.

== Expansion ==
The latter half of the eighteenth century saw a large expansion in coal mining. There was increased demand for coal for use in local iron production. Steam-driven machinery, specifically the Newcomen engine was introduced to pump water from the pits, enabling the coal to be worked at greater depths. The ability to transport bulk cargoes of coal was the impetus for the building of the Birmingham Canal Navigations network. The first barge load of coal from Wednesbury was conveyed to Birmingham in 1769. The transportation of coal by canal rather than by road led to a significant reduction in its unit price in Birmingham. In the first half of the nineteenth century the area of coal mining expanded to Halesowen, Kingswinford and Oldswinford and towards West Bromwich.

== Development of a mine ==
A small pit like the Racecourse Colliery would usually start up in the following way: a few men would get together and rent the mineral rights from whoever owned them; in this area that was often the Earl of Dudley. This gave them the right to mine a few acres of land for whatever minerals lay under the ground, rather like an underground small-holding. In some cases the tenants would be working men, probably miners themselves, who had saved the money from their wages to make this small investment. Other pits were tenanted by ironmasters who required coal to make coke for iron smelting. Alternatively, the landowner could mine the coal and appoint an agent or a manager to run the pit.

The first stage of opening the mine was to dig the shaft. Initially, a small makeshift frame would be used to shift the spoil, but as the shaft grew deeper a proper head frame would be erected, with a winch to raise and lower the bowk. This was eventually replaced by a cage. A sinking winding engine powered by steam would be established in a temporary corrugated iron engine house. The miners digging out the shaft were lowered down in the bowk. The bowk was also used to remove the spoil as it was dug out and the shaft was then lined with brickwork. The spoil from the shaft was emptied into a tipping wagon pushed along on tracks, then tipped off to form the characteristic 'finger' spoil heaps of most small Black Country pits. The rocky waste and clay was known as 'tocky'. Once the shaft was established the sinking engine would either be dismantled and sold on or kept to use in an emergency.

== Working the mine ==
The predominant coal measure in the Black Country was the ten yard thick seam. Coal was extracted using the Pillar and Stall method with pillars of coal left in place to support the mine roof. Most Black Country pits were naturally ventilated up until the twentieth century.

== Useful Facts ==
- There were two basic wage rates one for thick coal and one for thin coal.
- The difference was normally 1/-. This extra shilling was a kind of danger money for the thick coal miners
- A daily wage for thick coal miners in 1842 was 2s 4d (2/4). and in 1845 it was 4s (4/-)
- By 1873 a daily wage for thick coal was 5/6d
- By 1842, Pay for a boy running the gin horse was 2/6 per week
- Until the early 1870s a normal day's stint was 12 hours with a 60-minute drink hour. If working six days this would equal a sixty-six-hour week.
