= Beech Tree Colliery, Cradley Heath =

Coal mine in West Midlands, England

Coordinates: 52.4526°N 2.0930°W

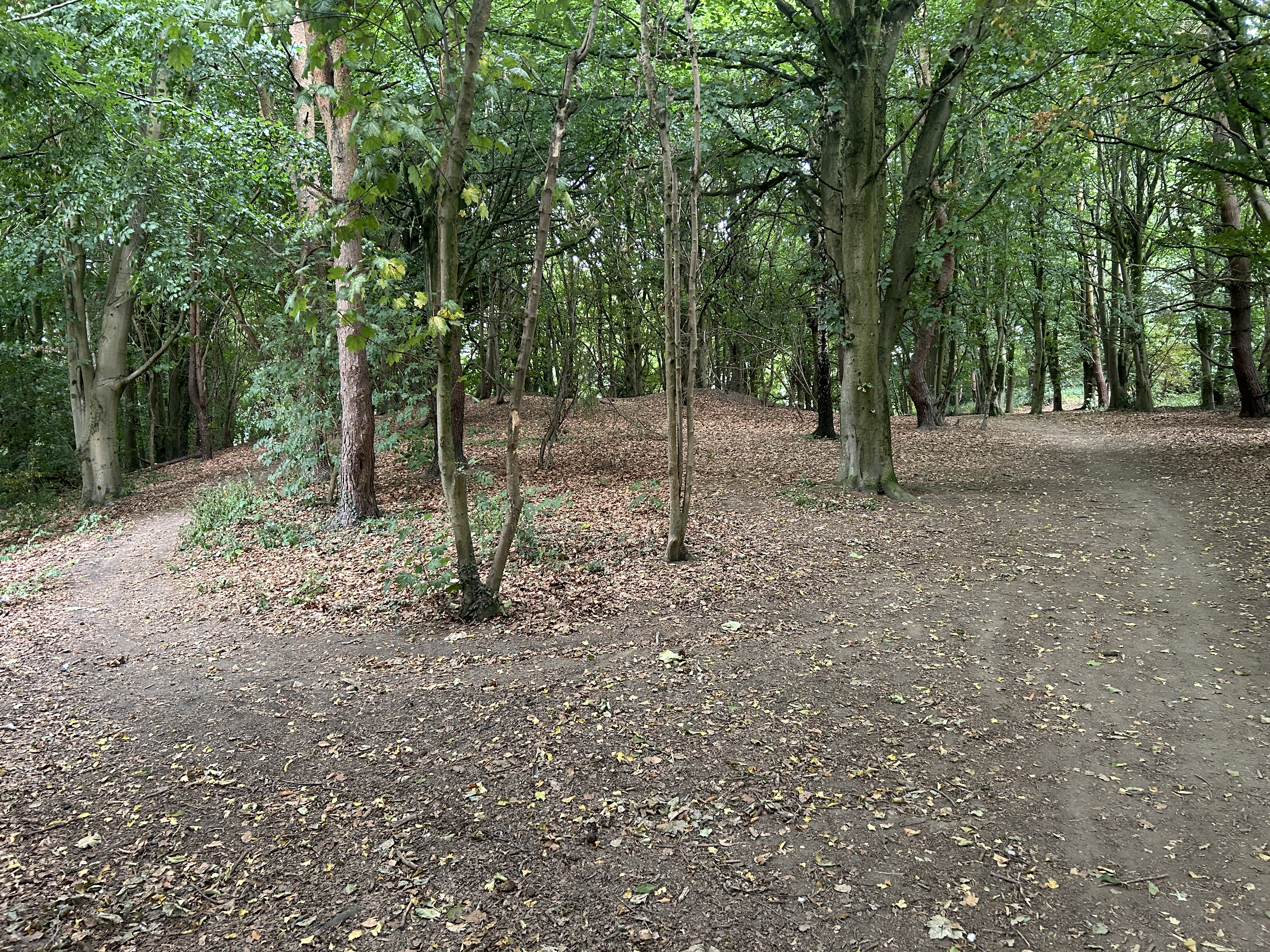
The site of Beech Tree Colliery, now a pleasant woodland

Beech Tree Colliery

Beech Tree Colliery was one of a number of coal mining collieries in the Cradley Heath area and one of the most southerly on the South Staffordshire coalfield. The shafts were sunk in 1873, although very little, if any mining, took place prior to 1921. The Colliery is located on Foxcote Lane, Cradley Heath, close to its junction with Oldnall Road. It has also been known as Foxcote Colliery and Pig Lane Pit. It finally closed in 1958.

== History ==
The land that was to form Beech Tree Colliery was acquired by Sir Charles Holcroft in 1873, one of a number of his mining ventures in the local area. Shafts were sunk in 1873 and 1874, revealing coal and fireclay at around 600 feet below the surface.

In the months that followed, buildings were erected including a brick built engine house for the stationary steam engine, which are showing on OS Maps dated 1882. Despite what was no doubt considerable expenditure and effort to bring this mine into use, no mining actually took place. Rumours abounded at the time that a manager from a neighbouring colliery bribed the nightwatchman for access to the underground workings and having discovered a good seam of coal in one direction in particular, his Company immediately bought the mineral rights to this area, leaving Sir Charles with little he could do with the mine and it was essentially abandoned, left to be reclaimed by nature.

In 1919 the site was acquired by Messrs. Mobberley and Perry Limited. At this time the same company was already operating Oldnall Colliery, on the opposite side of Oldnall Road and only approximately 450 metres to the west of the exploratory shafts sunk at Beech Tree Colliery. Oldnall Colliery produced coal and fireclay, with a tramway installed to provide access from Oldnall Colliery down the slope to the brickworks located at the base of the slope near what is now The Hayes (A458). This also provided access to the Midlands rail network, joining the mainline to the east of Lye Railway Station. Also in this area, the Company operated Hayes Colliery, which was immediately adjacent to the brickworks.

However, it was not until 1921 that Mobberley and Perry turned their attention towards Beech Tree Colliery, which began producing good quality fireclay by 1925. The mine was producing around 5,000 tons of coal and fireclay a week at this point.

Around this time, the tramway running from the brickworks up to Oldnall Colliery had been extended under Oldnall Road and into Beech Tree Colliery.

By 1933 the mine was employing 155 people, 120 being underground workers.

In 1944 the decision was made to close Oldnall Colliery, Hayes Colliery already having closed in 1929, and the focus of operations shifted to Beech Tree Colliery. Around this time the Colliery was still rather old-fashioned in its operation and when the site fell under the jurisdiction of the National Coal Board in 1947, significant amounts of money were expended to modernise the site, including construction of a pit-head bath house, on the opposite side of Foxcote Lane, with washing facilities at the pit-head being something sorely missed by the miners prior to this. In 1947 the site employed 281 people and was producing a significant amount of coal (80,000 tons per week) and fireclay (20,000 tons per week).

Following the completion of these works, the mine continued to be productive until 1958 when flooding of the mine occurred over the period of a couple of weeks. The mine was un-occupied at the time the water began seeping through the clay sub-soil and there were no casualties, but significant amounts of mining equipment were lost underground. The N.C.B. assessed the situation to determine if work could be carried on, but it was ultimately determined to cease operations as they would not be financially viable any longer. Men and horses were transferred to other collieries, many going to Himley and Baggeridge.

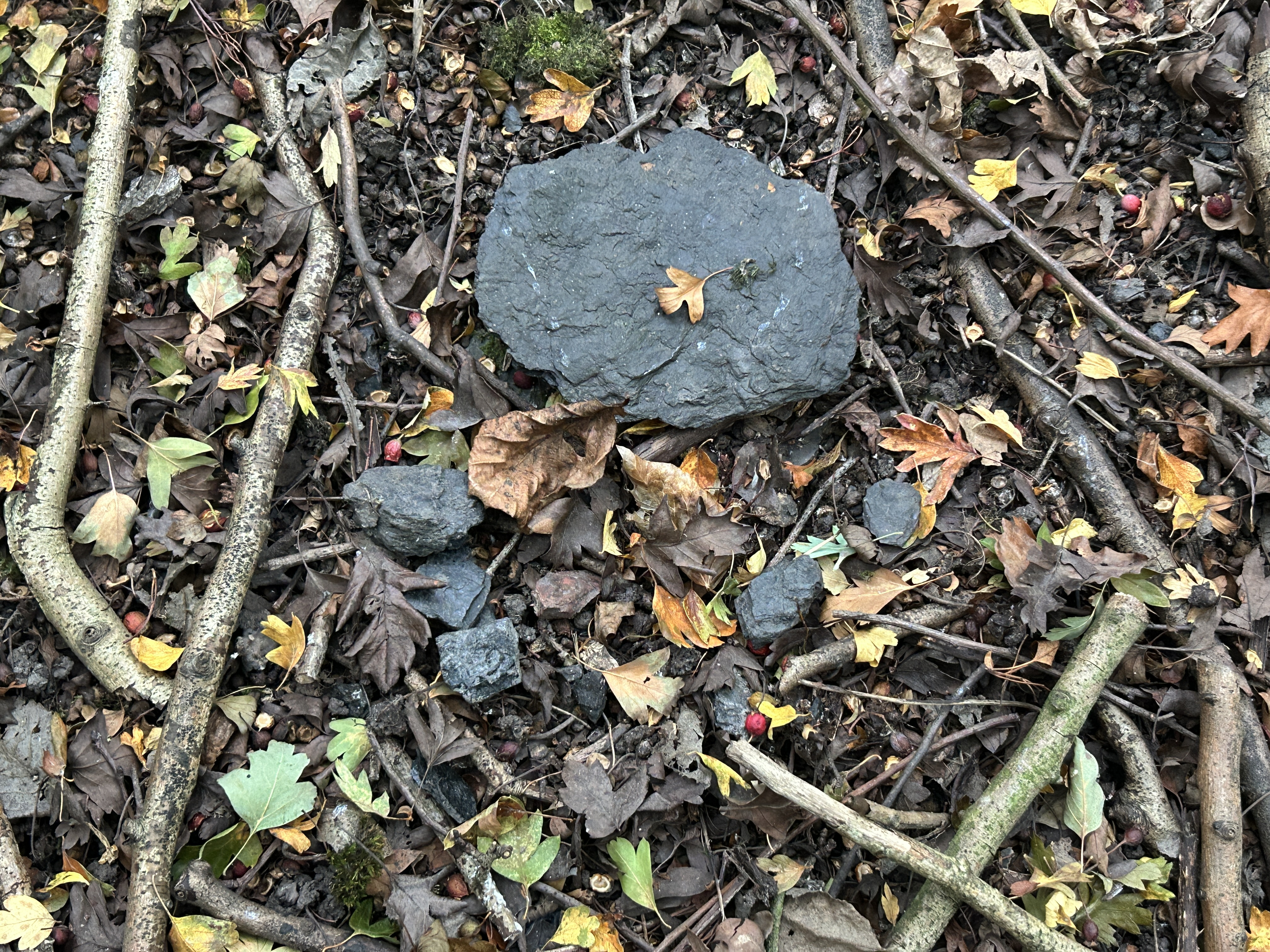
Coal fragments remaining on the surface

The coal shafts were capped in 1958 with demolition of the buildings being completed around 1961. The only remaining complete structure is the pit-head bath house, now in use as a Scout Hut. The main colliery site has been landscaped into pleasant woodland, albeit the spoil heaps and path of the tramway can still be ascertained. A certain amount of coal fragments still remain on the surface.
