= Cotwall End Valley =

Nature reserve in West Midlands, England

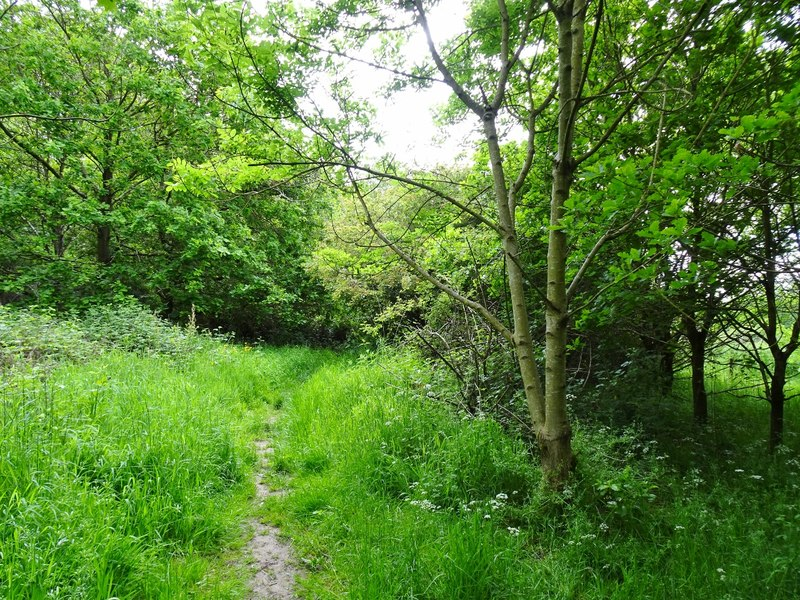
- A path in the nature reserve

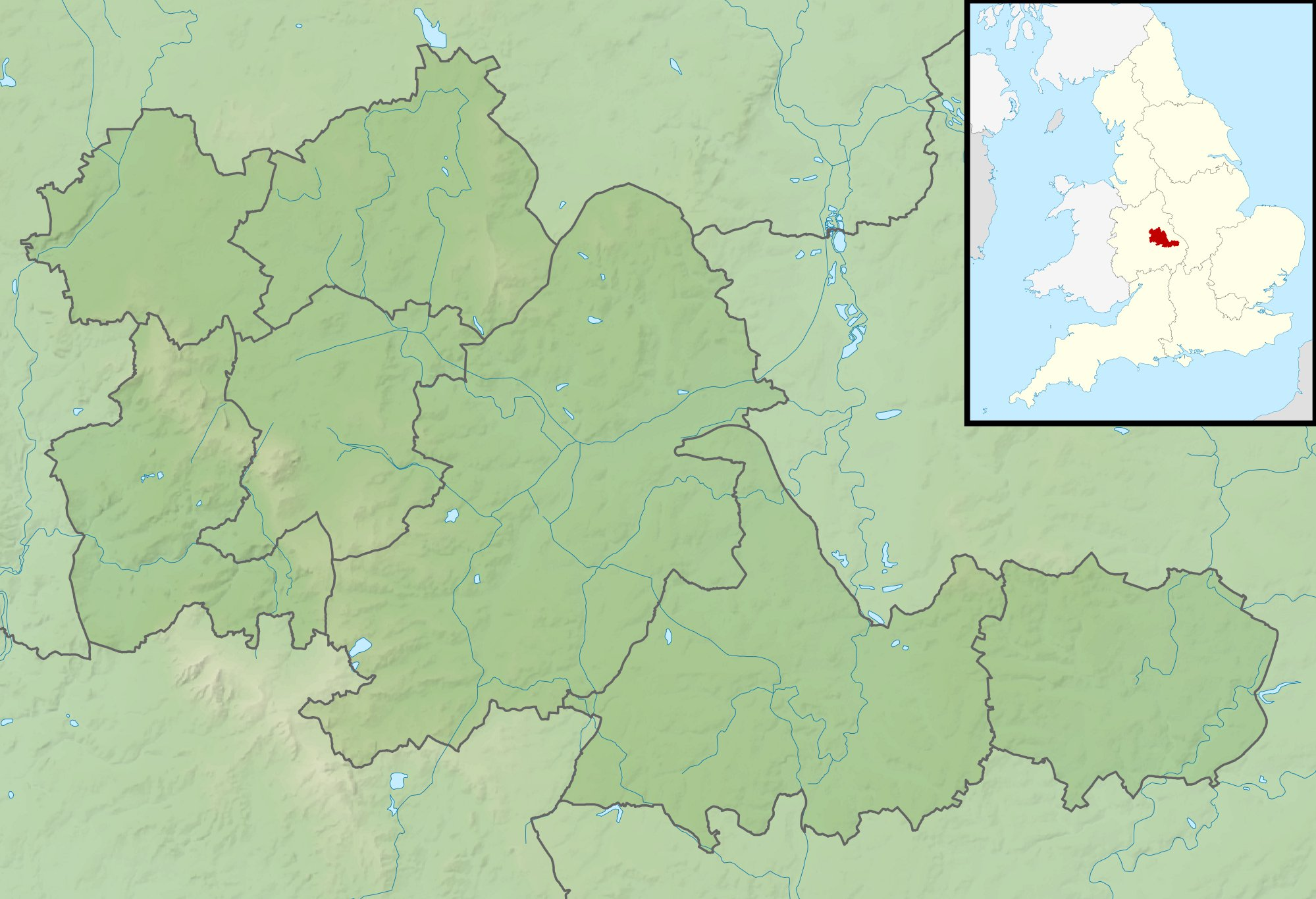
- Location within West Midlands county
- Interactive map of Cotwall End Valley
- Location: near Dudley
- OS grid: SO 911 922
- Coordinates: 52.5311°N 2.1282°W
- Area: 56.04 hectares (138.5 acres)
- Designation: Local nature reserve Site of Importance for Nature Conservation
- Website: Cotwall End Local Nature Reserve

Cotwall End Valley is a local nature reserve in West Midlands, England. It is about a mile south of Sedgley, in the Metropolitan Borough of Dudley.

It incorporates some of the grounds of Ellowes Hall, a stately home built in the early 19th century and demolished in 1964, which has led to the wooded part of the valley being known locally as "Ellowes Hall Wood".

== Description ==
It was declared a local nature reserve (LNR) by Dudley Metropolitan Borough Council in 1990. It is also a Site of Importance for Nature Conservation. The reserve, area 56.04 hectares (138.5 acres), contains grassland, woodland including ancient woodland, and lowland heath. Some of the flora and fauna is rare nationally.

=== Geology ===
The valley is on two branches of a major geological fault at the edge of the South Staffordshire coalfield, and so there is great geological diversity. These features, meeting the criteria specified by the Global Geoparks Network, make it a geosite within the Black Country Geopark. Turner's Hill, within the reserve at grid reference SO 909 918, area 1.56 hectares (3.9 acres), is a Site of Special Scientific Interest for its geology: important strata of the late Silurian period can be seen.
