= Charles Holcroft =

Charles Holcroft may refer to:

- Sir Charles Holcroft, 1st Baronet (1831–1917), British iron and coal master, and collector of fossils
- Sir Charles Anthony Culcheth Holcroft, 4th Baronet (born 1959), of the Holcroft baronets of Eaton Mascott
