= Holcroft baronets of Eaton Mascott (1921) =

The Holcroft baronetcy, of Eaton Mascott in the Parish of Berrington in the County of Shropshire, was created in the Baronetage of the United Kingdom on 12 January 1921 for George Holcroft. He was Chairman of Littleton Collieries and also served as High Sheriff of Staffordshire from 1913 to 1914. He was the nephew of the 1st Baronet of the 1905 creation.

The 3rd Baronet was High Sheriff of Shropshire from 1969 to 1970. He died in 2009 and was succeeded by his son, the 4th baronet.

The Holcroft family sold the Eaton Mascott estate in the late 1990s.

== Holcroft baronets, of Eaton Mascott (1921) ==
- Sir George Harry Holcroft, 1st Baronet (1856–1951)
- Sir Reginald Culcheth Holcroft, 2nd Baronet (1899–1978)
- Sir Peter George Culcheth Holcroft, 3rd Baronet (1931–2009)
- Sir Charles Anthony Culcheth Holcroft, 4th Baronet (born 1959)

The heir to the baronetcy is the present holder's son, Toby David Culcheth Holcroft (born 1990).
