= Hopcroft =

Hopcroft is a surname. Notable people with the surname include:

- John Hopcroft (born 1939), American theoretical computer scientist
- Ron Hopcroft (1918–2016), British ultrarunner

== See also ==
- Holcroft
- Howcroft
