= The Racecourse Colliery =

Exhibit at the Black Country Living Museum

Coordinates: 52°31′18″N 2°04′36″W

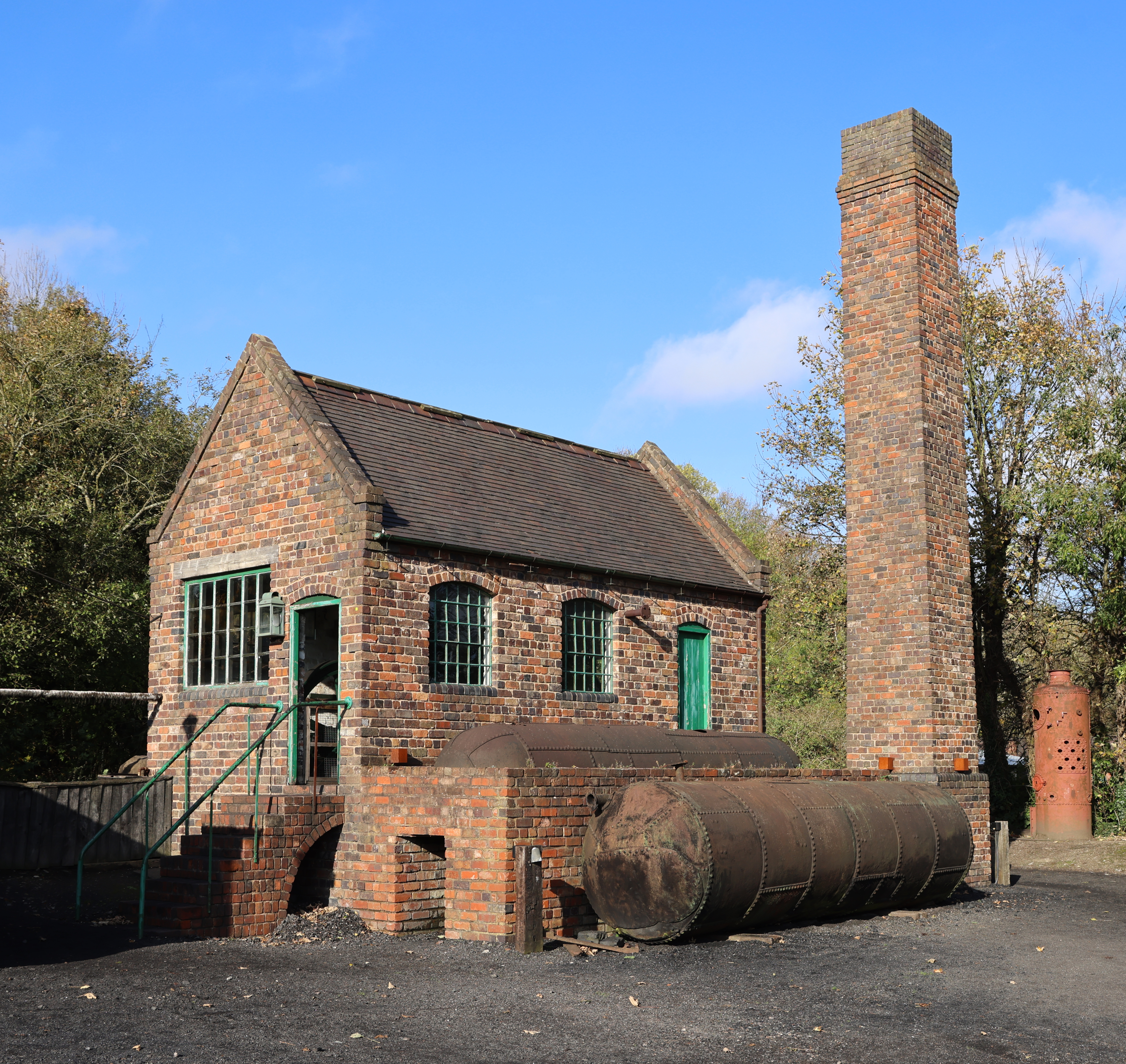
The building housing the colliery winding engine

The Racecourse Colliery is an exhibit located at the Black Country Living Museum.

== Original mine shafts at the Black Country Living Museum ==
The Black Country Living Museum has more than 40 old mine shafts on its site, which have largely been lost, in-filled, collapsed, stabilised or capped. One of the original surviving shafts has been used to create the Racecourse Colliery exhibit. It was originally the shaft of one of the Earl of Dudley's small pits, Coneygree Colliery Pit No 126, which operated between 1860 and 1902. After the pit was abandoned, all the surface landmarks were removed and the shaft itself was eventually filled in.

Work started on the creation of the Racecourse Colliery exhibit in 1979 and, with the exception of the head frame, all work was carried out on Sundays by volunteers from the Birmingham Enterprise Club and the Friends of the Black Country Museum Mining Group. The colliery was re-created following exactly the same sequence as the creation of an actual working Black Country pit. The shaft was re-opened to a depth of 64 feet (its original depth was between 100 and 120 feet). The lining brickwork was also repaired. The coal obtainable from this pit is Bottom Coal- about 100 ft down. Close to this exhibit another original shaft was used to create Racecourse Colliery Number Two Pit, also referred to as Brook Shaft. Here coal was worked at 30 ft and has 8 ft of Bottom Coal showing. Moulds from this shaft were used to create the 'coal' for the museum's underground drift mine experience, 'Into the Thick'.

Other principal coal seams in the South Staffordshire Coalfield include Brooch, Flying Reed, Upper Heathen, Stinking (sulphur), New Mine, Fireclay and the famous Thick Coal.

== Features of Racecourse Colliery ==
The buildings and other features of the Racecourse Colliery are either replicas of known mining landmarks, or have been devised on the basis of photographs and existing knowledge of old Black Country pits. The exception to this is the Weighbridge House which is a historic building, relocated from Rolfe Street in Smethwick, where it stood in the Birmingham Canal Navigation's wharf yard. It was probably built in the early years of the 20th century. The reconstruction at Black Country Living Museum has been called Racecourse Colliery because the land on which it stands was originally the Earl of Dudley's private racecourse, which was closed when the railway line from Dudley to Wolverhampton was built in 1852.

=== Manager's Office ===
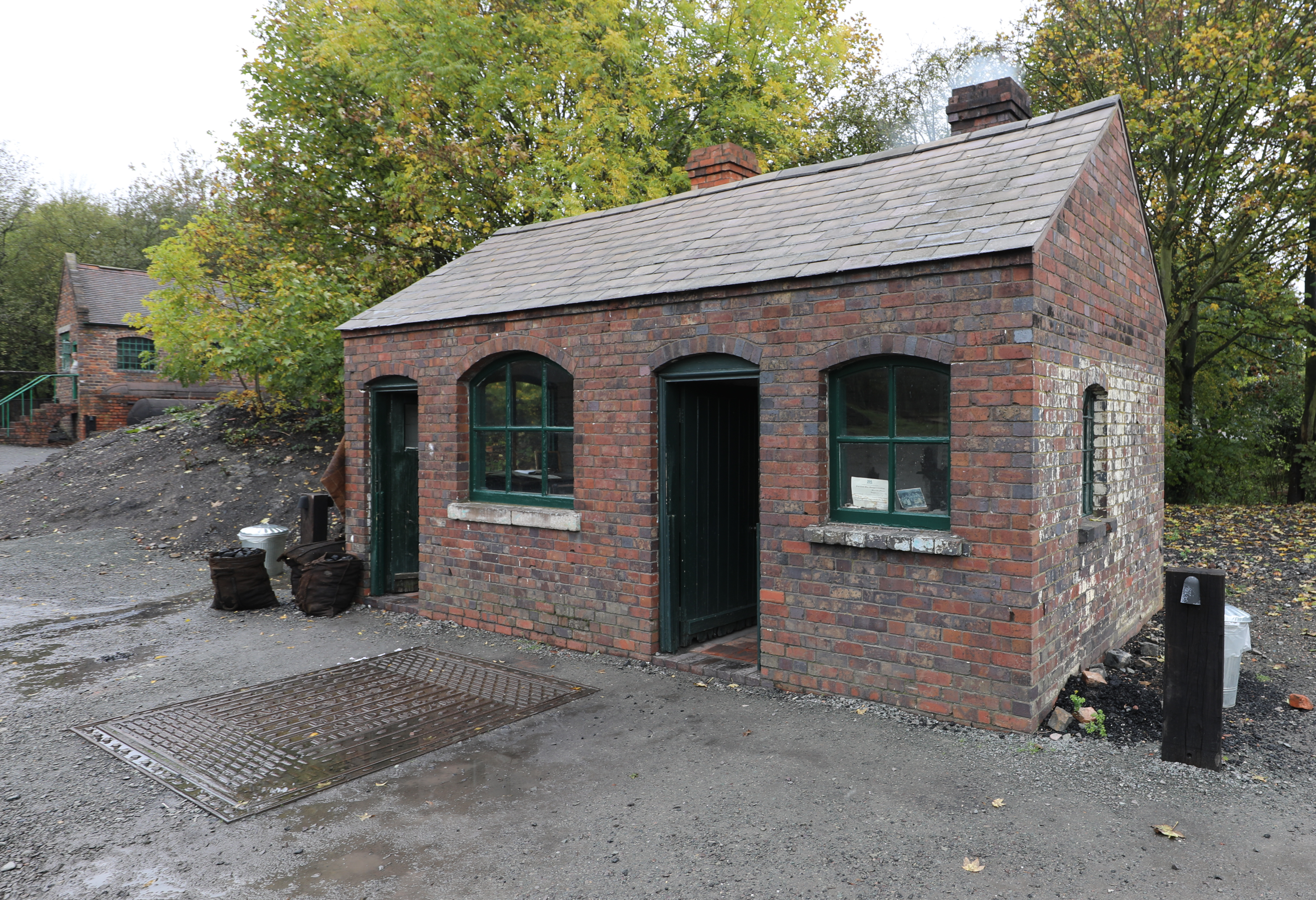
The Manager's Office, Weighbridge Office and weighbridge

This pit features a Manager's Office and a Weighbridge Office that sit side by side. Many of the small pits did not have a resident manager instead, one manager would look after a number of pits. One of the manager's jobs was to make sure that all the mine plans were kept up-to-date, these plans would have been kept in the office. There are no safety lamps in the office; many Black Country pits did not use them as working lights because the shallow workings enabled some of the volatile gases to escape to the surface. Mines like this were known as 'naked lamp' mines, i.e. the miners would have to make do with tallow candles set in a lump of clay.

Mines were run on a day-to-day basis by the butty, this position can be compared to the modern-day contactor who would agree to sell coal to the mine owner at a fixed price. The butty would also hire and fire the men as required and at a pit like this, between six and 30 men could be employed. Every morning before the start of the shift the butty would go down with his safety lamp and check the workings for gases and to see if any more pit props were required.

At 6.30 in the morning the miners started work. They were lowered down the shaft in a cage (by the head frame). These cages were also used to bring up coal as it was mined. A Winding engine housed in a brick building would operate the cage.

=== The Winding Engine ===
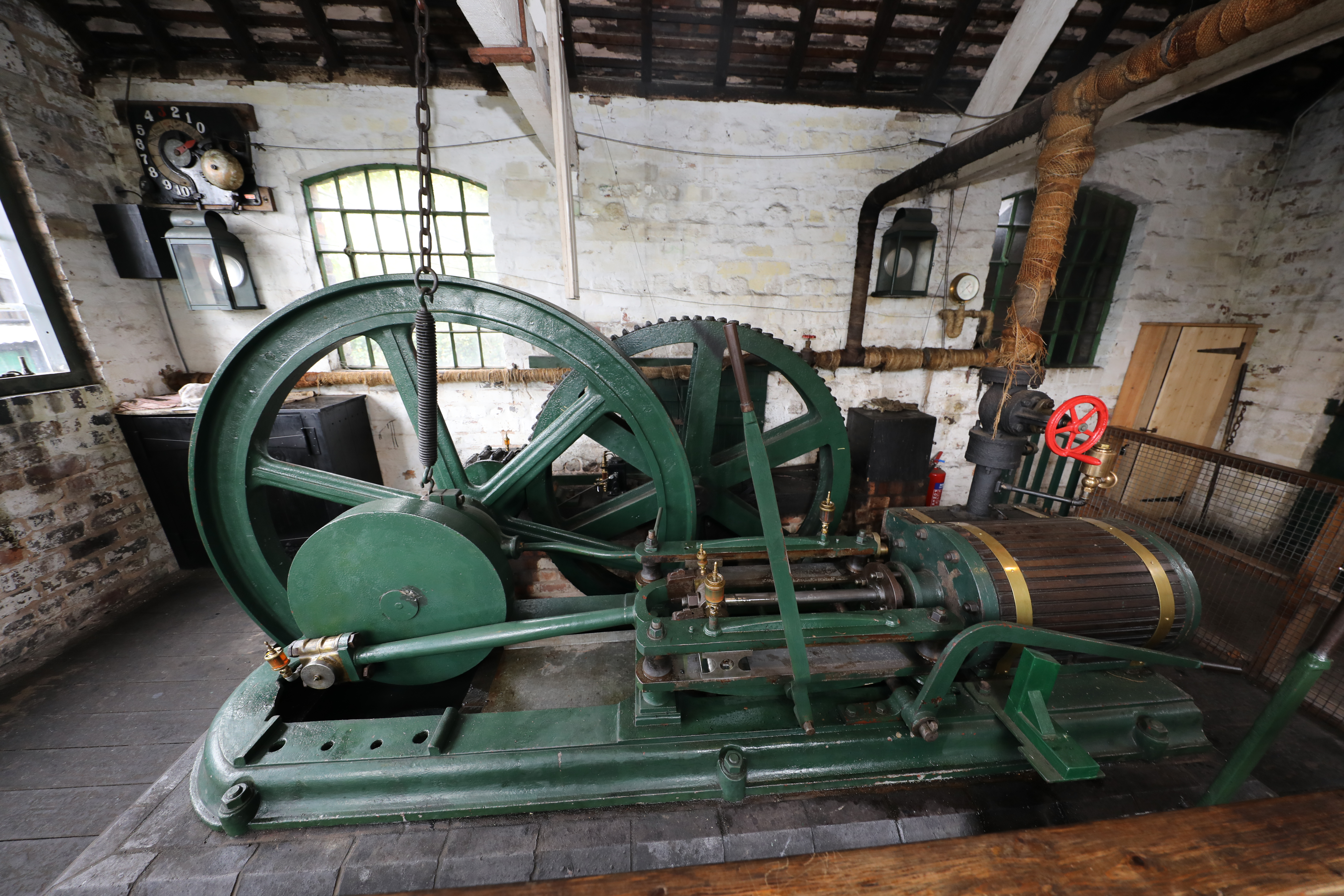
The winding engine

The winding house at the museum is a replica based on the one that used to stand at Amblecote Colliery No.2 Pit. At the back of the building is the large drum which holds the wire rope that runs over the wheel at the top of the head frame and lifts the cage. This drum is rotated by a Steam engine inside the engine house. The steam to power the engine would have come from the Egg-ended boiler in front of the engine house. Heating all the water in the boiler to convert it to steam took a long time so the fire beneath the boiler was kept lit all the time. The engine operator kept the fire stoked during the day, but at about 3pm when the shift ended the fire would be banked up and left overnight. The museum does not use this boiler to raise steam when it operates the colliery winder, instead a smaller Vertical boiler is used which is housed at the rear of the engine house.

Apart from using the winding engine to raise and lower the miners and the coal tubs, the winding engine would also have been used to remove water from the pit. This was done by a process called tanking. After 1864 all coal miners had to have two head frames and two shafts to provide an extra way out of the workings in an emergency. The second shaft would be situated over the lowest point of the pit so that all the water would gather there in a sump. The winding engine would lower a tank into the sump, a special valve enabled the tank to fill with water, the tank was then raised and someone on the surface pulled a lever one the tank to discharge the water from the pit. There is one of these tanks lying at the side of the miner's hovel.

To the side of the brick engine shed is a small corrugated building which houses the engine and fan. This was installed to provide adequate ventilation in a mine. The engine is from Amblecote Fireclay Pit c1860 and was made by J. C. Stark of Torquay. It was found dismantled in the Orangery at Shugborough. The fan sucks the air from the pit. The upright part is called the evaze and is designed to dissipate the air.

=== The Head Frame ===
The Headframe is a replica of the one that used to stand at the Amblecote Colliery Pit No.12. At the bottom of the shaft was the on-setter, the man whose job it was to load the coal tubs into the cages. When the cage was loaded he would shout or signal (via the bell fixed to the head frame) to the man at the top the shaft, the banks man. He in turn would signal to the engine operator to raise the cage. At the top the banks man would take the truck from the cage, push it along the rails to the land sale wharf. The rails are laid on a slope above the wharf and loaded up with coal.

=== The Hovel ===
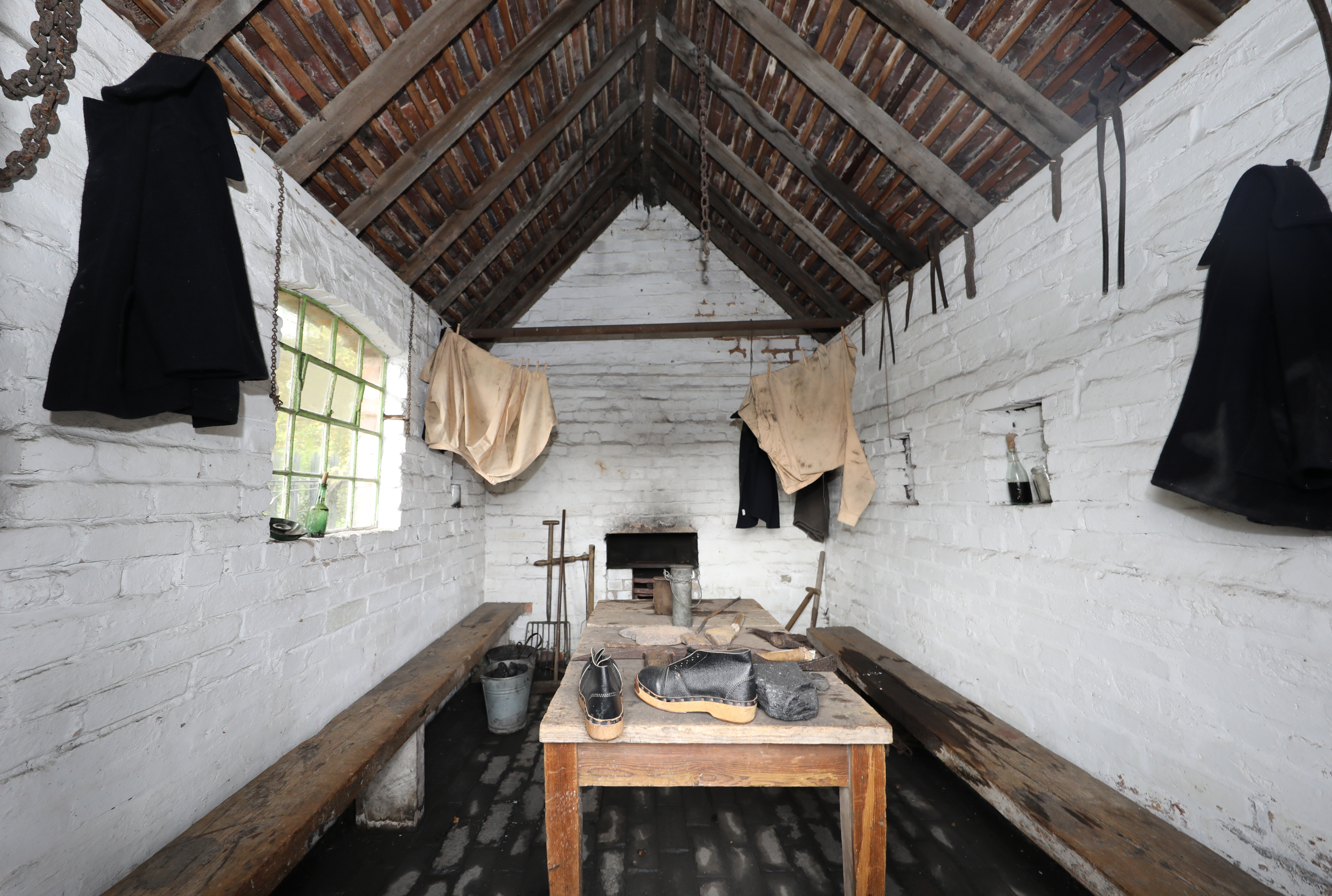
the interior of the hovel

The miners' Hovel is the workmen's mess room and the place where miners could dry their wet pit clothes at the end of the day. A fire was kept lit in the hovel and wet clothes left hanging in there overnight were usually dry again by morning. The men could also brew a hot drink in the hovel, eat their 'snap'(lunch usually in a tin or cloth covered bowl) or fry bacon and egg on a shovel over the fire. In some pits with a good boss, a barrel of beer may be provided to take underground.

=== The Blacksmith’s Shop ===
The Blacksmith's Shop was for keeping the miners' picks sharp, they had to be kept sharp to cut the coal. Tools were sharpened by heating and hammering rather than sharpening with a file. The tools had to be kept sharp in order to get fast results. If a pit did not have a blacksmith the picks would be regularly taken along to the nearest local blacksmith for sharpening. The forge would also be used for making or repairing wrought iron equipment or tub bodies. Rattle chain (Black Country term for flat winding chain ) would have been repaired by the blacksmith. The chain was wound on a narrow reel similar to camera film, not on a drum, and rattled as it wound. Metal tyres for wooden wheels were heated on the forge and the shrunk onto the wooden wheels.
