= George Holcroft =

English coal mine owner and philanthropist (1856–1951)

Sir George Holcroft Bt
- Born: George Harry Holcroft; 1856
- Died: 19 April 1951 (aged 94–95)
- Other names: Coal owner, philanthropist

Sir George Harry Holcroft, 1st Baronet (1856 – 19 April 1951) was an English coal mine owner and philanthropist.

The fourth son of William Holcroft of Brierley Hill, he matriculated at Exeter College, Oxford, in 1876, graduating BA in 1879 and MA in 1883. He was chairman of Littleton Collieries. He also served as high sheriff of Staffordshire from 1913 to 1914. Like his uncle, Sir Charles Holcroft, he was a great benefactor to the University of Birmingham, and for these services he was created a Baronet in the 1921 New Year Honours. In 1923 he served as Treasurer of the Royal Salop Infirmary in Shrewsbury. His home was at Eaton Mascott Hall, near Shrewsbury.

== Footnotes ==
Baronetage of the United Kingdom
New creation	Baronet (of Eaton Mascott); 1921–1951	Succeeded by Reginald Holcroft
