= Howcroft =

Howcroft is a surname. Notable people with the surname include:

- Albert Howcroft (1882–1955), English cricketer
- Arthur Howcroft (born 1976), British trade union leader.
- Jack Howcroft (1874–1962), English football referee
- Russel Howcroft (born 1965), Australian businessman

== See also ==
- Hopcroft
