= Black Country =

Area of the West Midlands, England

- Region
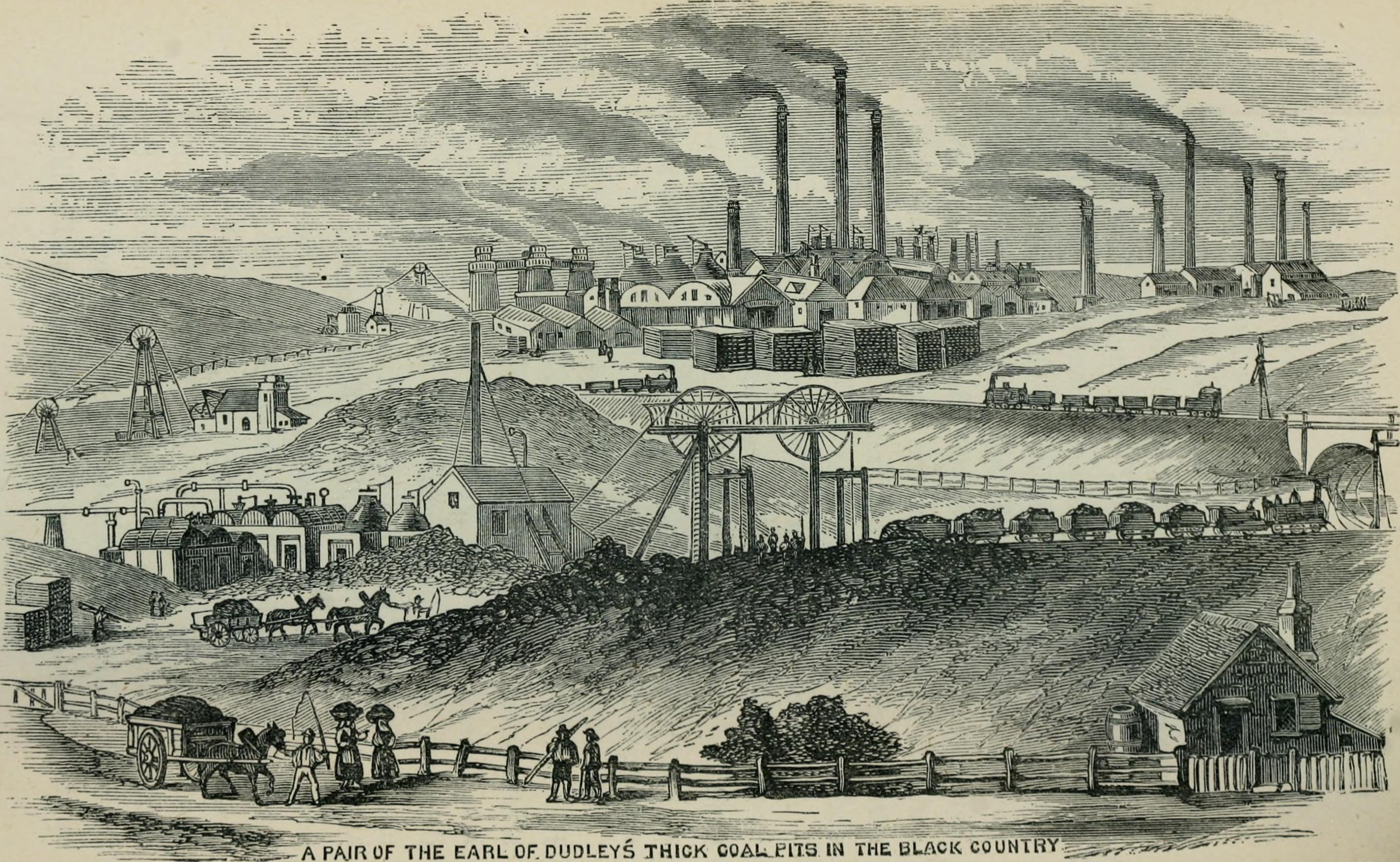
- The Black Country in the 1870s

- Flag
- Etymology: Effects of industry or coal mining
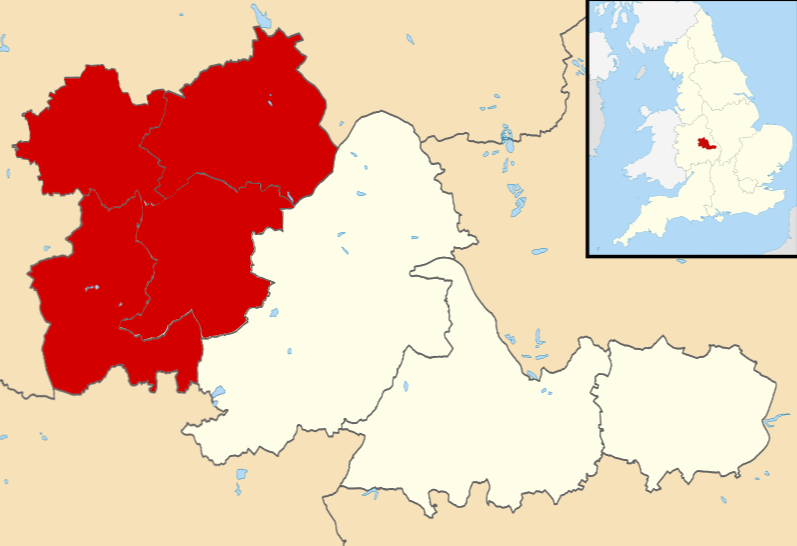
- The metropolitan boroughs of Dudley, Sandwell, Walsall and the City of Wolverhampton highlighted within the West Midlands metropolitan county
- Coordinates: 52°33′N 2°02′W
- Country: England
- County: West Midlands
- Historic counties: Staffordshire; Worcestershire; Shropshire

Area
  - Total: 138 sq mi (360 km^{2})
- Highest elevation: 889 ft (271 m)

Population (2012)
  - Total: 1,146,800
  - Density: 8,310/sq mi (3,210/km^{2})
- Demonym: Yam Yam (colloquial)

The Black Country is a loosely defined area of England's West Midlands. It is mainly urban, covering most of the Dudley, Sandwell, Walsall and Wolverhampton metropolitan boroughs. The 14-mile (23 km) road between Wolverhampton and Birmingham was described as "one continuous town" in 1785.

The area was one of the Industrial Revolution's birthplaces. Its name was first recorded in the 1840s, and derives either from the 30-foot-thick (9.1-metre) coal seam close to the surface or the production of coal, coke, iron, glass, bricks and steel which produced high levels of soot and air pollution.

== Extent ==
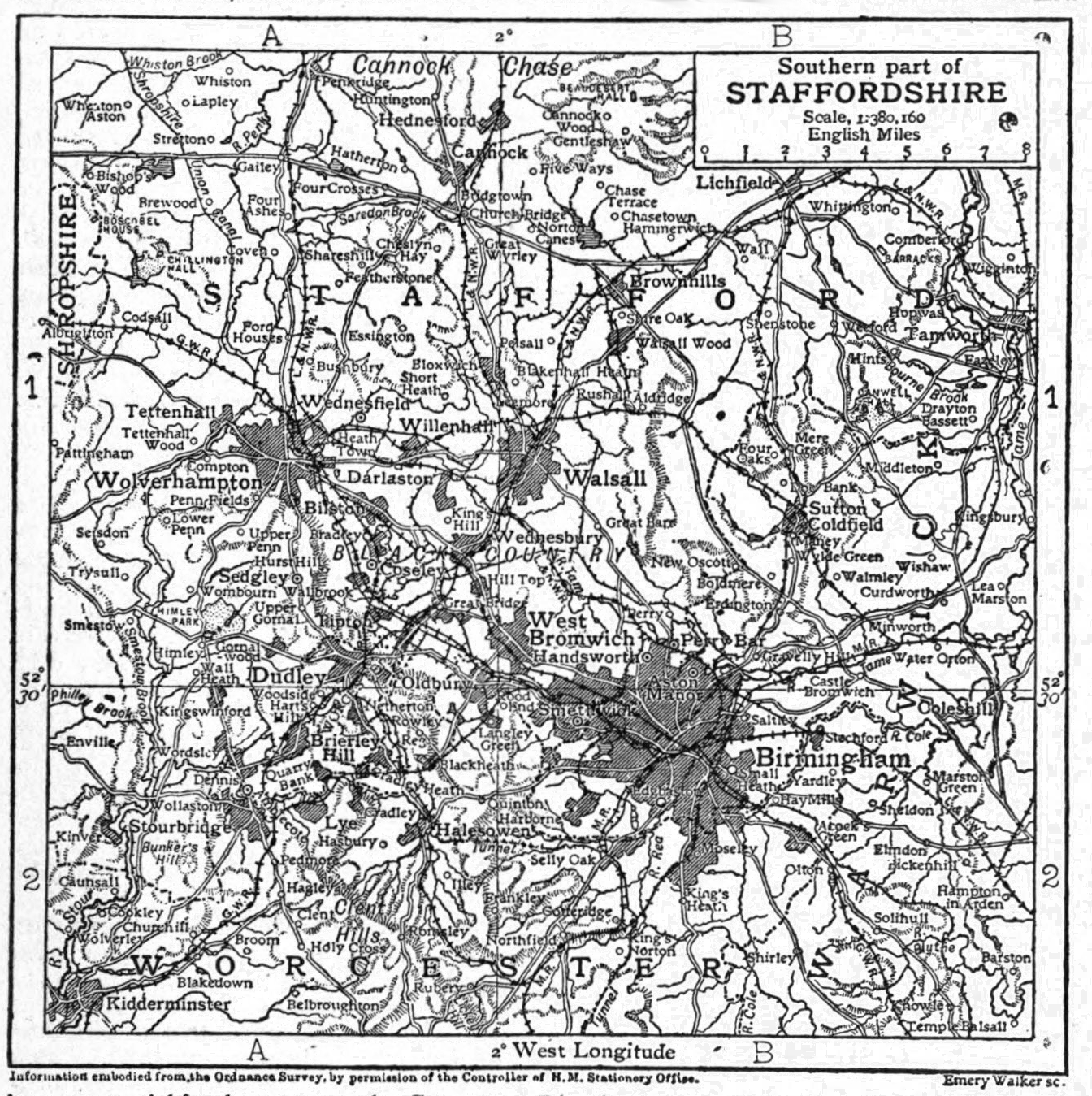
South Staffordshire in 1911. The Black Country lies to the west and north-west of the city of Birmingham.

The Black Country has no single set of defined boundaries. Some traditionalists define it as "the area where the coal seam comes to the surface – so West Bromwich, Oldbury, Blackheath, Cradley Heath, Old Hill, Bilston, Dudley, Tipton, Wednesbury, and parts of Halesowen, Walsall and Smethwick or what used to be known as Warley." There are records from the 18th century of shallow coal mines in Wolverhampton, however. Others have included areas slightly outside the coal field which were associated with heavy industry.

Walsall and Wolverhampton’s Black Country status was secure throughout the 19th century and the first half of the 20th, with Arthur Mee positing that Wolverhampton was the “capital of The Black Country” in The King's England: Staffordshire (1937). Both boroughs were expanded to include increasingly suburban outskirts, which may have influenced the Dudley-centric publication The BlackCountryMan (and later, the Black Country Bugle) to perpetuate the idea that neither borough was part of the region (although the Bugle now includes content on all four boroughs). The towns of Dudley and Tipton are today generally considered to be the centre.

Bilston-born Samuel Griffiths, in his 1876 Griffiths Guide to the Iron Trade of Great Britain, stated: "The Black Country commences at Wolverhampton, extends a distance of sixteen miles to Stourbridge, eight miles to West Bromwich, penetrating the northern districts through Willenhall to Bentley, The Birchills, Walsall and Darlaston, Wednesbury, Smethwick and Dudley Port, West Bromwich and Hill Top, Brockmoor, Wordsley and Stourbridge. As the atmosphere becomes purer, we get to the higher ground of Brierley Hill, nevertheless here also, as far as the eye can reach, on all sides, tall chimneys vomit forth great clouds of smoke".

Today the term commonly refers to the majority of the four metropolitan boroughs of Dudley, Sandwell, Walsall and Wolverhampton although it is said that "no two Black Country men or women will agree on where it starts or ends".

=== Local government ===
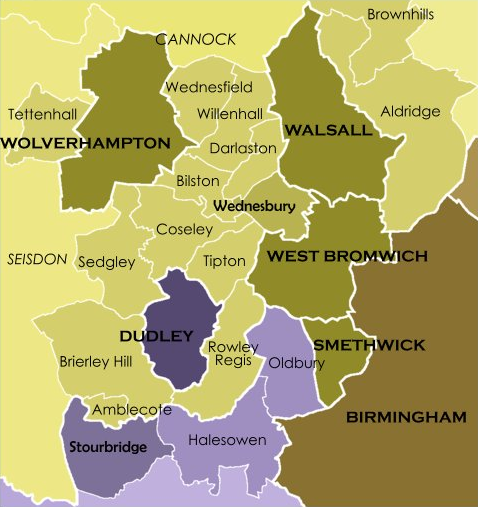
The local government structure within North Worcestershire and South Staffordshire before the West Midlands 1965 reorganisation

Official use of the name came in 1987 with the Black Country Development Corporation, an urban development corporation covering Sandwell and Walsall, which was disbanded in 1998. The Black Country Consortium (founded in 1999) and the Black Country Local Enterprise Partnership (founded in 2011) both define the Black Country as the four metropolitan boroughs of Dudley, Sandwell, Walsall and Wolverhampton, an approximate area of 138 square miles (360 km^{2}).

=== Cultural and industrial definition ===
The borders of the Black Country can be defined by using the special cultural and industrial characteristics of the area. Areas around the canals (the cut) which had mines extracting mineral resources and heavy industry refining these are included in this definition. Cultural parameters include unique or characteristic foods such as groaty pudding, grey peas and bacon, faggots, gammon or pork hocks and pork scratchings; Black Country humour; and the Black Country dialect.

=== Geological definitions ===
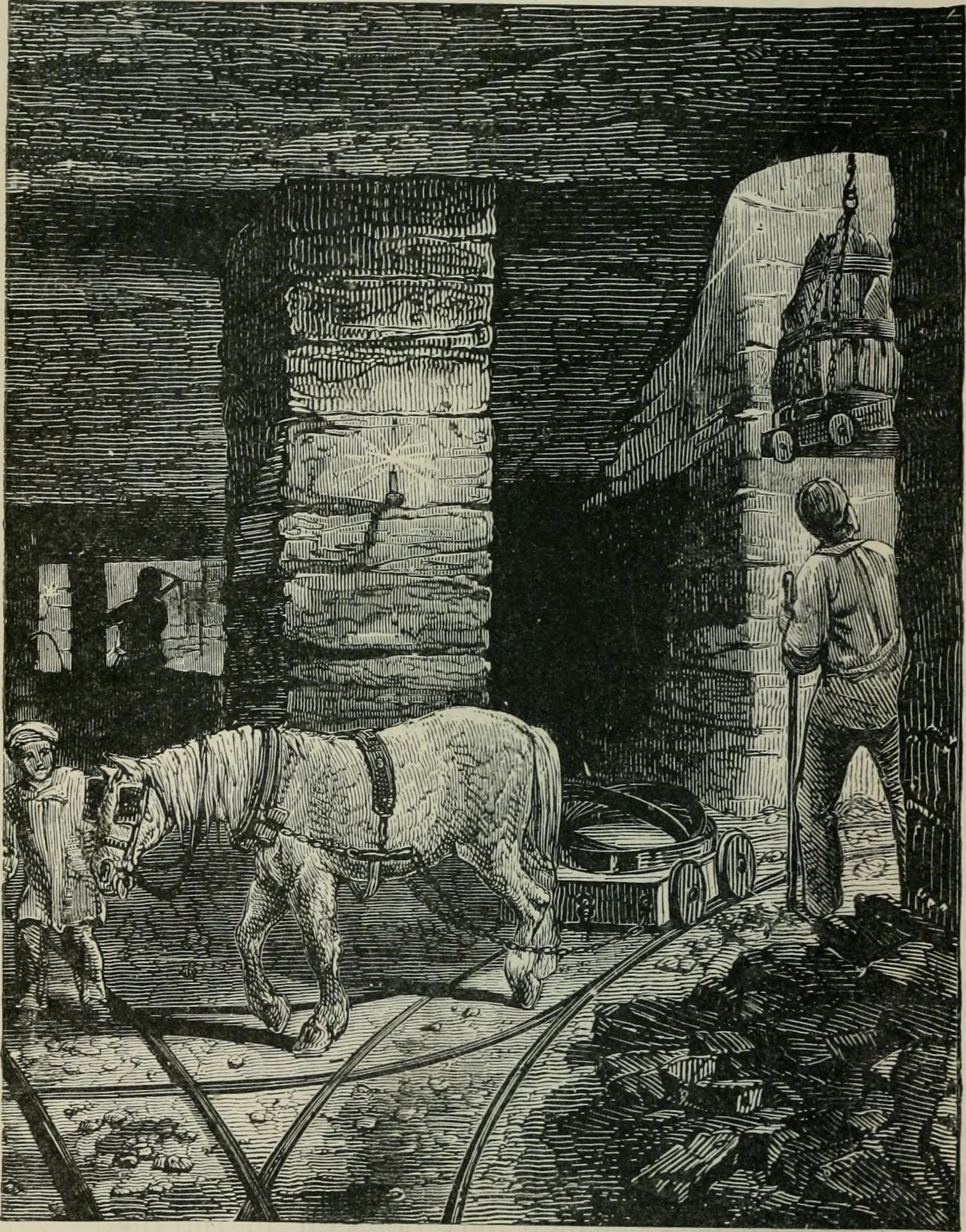
Mining the thick coal seam at one of the Earl of Dudley's pits in the 1870s

The Black Country Society defines the borders as the area on the 30-foot (9.1 m) coal seam, regardless the depth of the seam. This definition includes West Bromwich and Oldbury, which had many deep pits, and Smethwick. The thick coal that underlies Smethwick was not mined until the 1870s and Smethwick has retained more Victorian character than most West Midland areas. Sandwell Park Colliery's pit was located in Smethwick and had 'thick coal' as shown in written accounts from 1878. Coal was also heavily mined in Hamstead, further east, whose workings extended well under what is now north Birmingham. Smethwick and Dudley Port were described as "a thousand swarming hives of metallurgical industries" by Samuel Griffiths in 1872.

Another geological definition, the seam outcrop definition, only includes areas where the coal seam is shallow, making the soil black at the surface. Some coal mining areas to the east and west of the geologically defined Black Country are therefore excluded by this definition because the coal here is too deep down and does not outcrop. The seam outcrop definition excludes areas in North Worcestershire and South Staffordshire.

== Toponymy ==
The first recorded use of the term "the Black Country" may be from a toast given by a Mr Simpson, town clerk to Lichfield, addressing a Reformer's meeting on 24 November 1841, published in the Staffordshire Advertiser. He describes going into the "black country" of Staffordshire – Wolverhampton, Bilston and Tipton.

In published literature, the first reference dates from 1846 and occurs in the novel Colton Green: A Tale of the Black Country by the Reverend William Gresley, who was then a prebendary of Lichfield Cathedral. Gresley's opening paragraph starts "On the border of the agricultural part of Staffordshire, just before you enter the dismal region of mines and forges, commonly called the 'Black Country', stands the pretty village of Oakthorpe", "commonly" implying that the term was already in use. He also writes that "the whole country is blackened with smoke by day, and glowing with fires by night", and that "the 'Black Country' ... is about twenty miles in length and five in bredth [sic] reaching from north to south".

The phrase was used again, though as a description rather than a proper noun, by the Illustrated London News in an 1849 article on the opening of the South Staffordshire Railway. An 1851 guidebook to the London and North Western Railway included an entire chapter entitled "The Black Country", including an early description:

In this Black Country, including West Bromwich, Dudley, Darlaston, Bilston, Wolverhampton and several minor villages, a perpetual twilight reigns during the day, and during the night fires on all sides light up the dark landscape with a fiery glow. The pleasant green of pastures is almost unknown, the streams, in which no fishes swim, are black and unwholesome; the natural dead flat is often broken by high hills of cinders and spoil from the mines; the few trees are stunted and blasted; no birds are to be seen, except a few smoky sparrows; and for miles on miles a black waste spreads around, where furnaces continually smoke, steam engines thud and hiss, and long chains clank, while blind gin horses walk their doleful round. From time to time you pass a cluster of deserted roofless cottages of dingiest brick, half swallowed up in sinking pits or inclining to every point of the compass, while the timbers point up like the ribs of a half decayed corpse. The majority of the natives of this Tartarian region are in full keeping with the scenery – savages, without the grace of savages, coarsely clad in filthy garments, with no change on weekends or Sundays, they converse in a language belarded with fearful and disgusting oaths, which can scarcely be recognised as the same as that of civilized England.

— Samuel Sidney, Rides on Railway

This work was also the first to explicitly distinguish the area from nearby Birmingham, noting that "On certain rare holidays these people wash their faces, clothe themselves in decent garments, and, since the opening of the South Staffordshire Railway, take advantage of cheap excursion trains, go down to Birmingham to amuse themselves and make purchases."

The geologist Joseph Jukes made it clear in 1858 that he felt the meaning of the term was self-explanatory to contemporary visitors, remarking that "It is commonly known in the neighbourhood as the 'Black Country', an epithet the appropriateness of which must be acknowledged by anyone who even passes through it on a railway". Jukes based his Black Country on the seat of the great iron manufacture, which for him was geographically determined by the ironstone tract of the coalfield rather than the thick seam, running from Wolverhampton to Bloxwich, to West Bromwich, to Stourbridge and back to Wolverhampton again. A travelogue published in 1860 made the connection more explicit, calling the name "eminently descriptive, for blackness everywhere prevails; the ground is black, the atmosphere is black, and the underground is honeycombed by mining galleries stretching in utter blackness for many a league". An alternative theory for the meaning of the name is proposed as having been caused by the darkening of the local soil due to the outcropping coal and the seam near the surface.

It was however the American diplomat and travel writer Elihu Burritt who brought the term "the Black Country" into widespread common usage with the third, longest and most important of the travel books he wrote about Britain for American readers, his 1868 work Walks in The Black Country and its Green Borderland. Burritt had been appointed United States consul in Birmingham by Abraham Lincoln in 1864, a role that required him to report regularly on "facts bearing upon the productive capacities, industrial character and natural resources of communities embraced in their Consulate Districts" and as a result travelled widely from his home in Harborne, largely on foot, to explore the local area. Burritt's association with Birmingham dated back 20 years and he was highly sympathetic to the industrial and political culture of the town as well as being a friend to many of its leading citizens, so his portrait of the surrounding area was largely positive. He was the author of the famous early description of the Black Country as "black by day and red by night", adding appreciatively that it "cannot be matched, for vast and varied production, by any other space of equal radius on the surface of the globe". Burritt used the term to refer to a wider area than its common modern usage, however, devoting the first third of the book to Birmingham, which he described as "the capital, manufacturing centre, and growth of the Black Country", and writing "plant, in imagination, one foot of your compass at the Town Hall in Birmingham, and with the other sweep a circle of twenty miles [30 km] radius, and you will have, 'the Black Country" (this area includes Coventry, Kidderminster and Lichfield).

== History ==
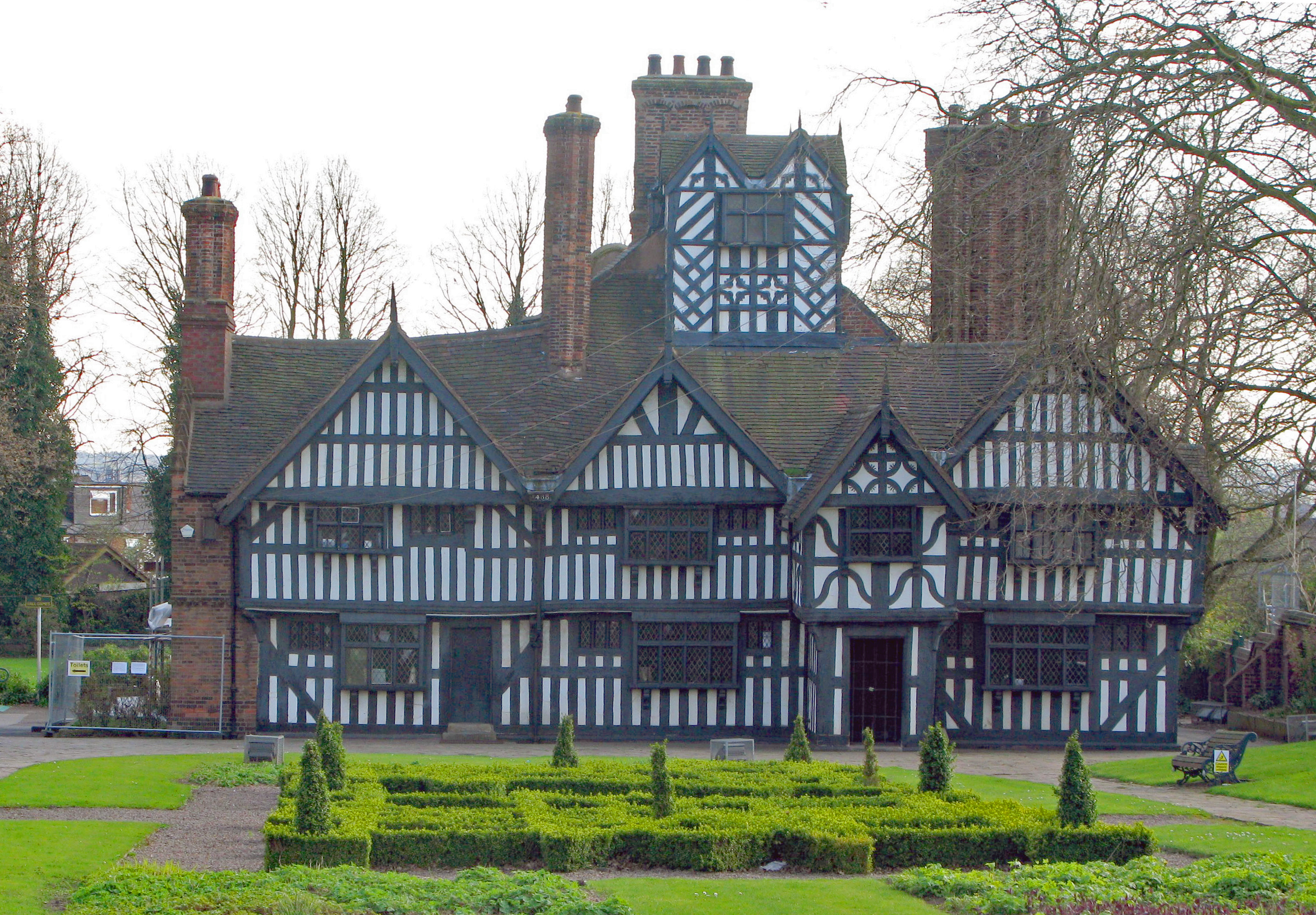
The Oak House, West Bromwich. A Yeoman Farmer's house dating from the late 16th or early 17th century, it represents a rare surviving building from the pre-industrial Black Country.

A few Black Country places such as Wolverhampton, Bilston and Wednesfield are mentioned in Anglo-Saxon charters and chronicles and the forerunners of a number of Black Country towns and villages such as Cradley, Dudley, Smethwick, and Halesowen are included in the Domesday Book of 1086. At this early date, the area was mostly rural. A monastery was founded in Wolverhampton in the Anglo-Saxon period and a castle and priory was built at Dudley during the period of Norman rule. Another religious house, Premonstratensian Abbey of Halesowen, was founded in the early 13th century. A number of Black Country villages developed into market towns and boroughs in the twelfth and thirteenth centuries, notably Dudley, Walsall and Wolverhampton. Coal mining was carried out for several centuries in the Black Country, starting from medieval times, and metalworking was important in the Black Country area as early as the 16th century spurred on by the presence of iron ore and coal in a seam 30 feet (9 m) thick, the thickest seam in Great Britain, which outcropped in various places. The first recorded blast furnace in the Black Country was built at West Bromwich in the early 1560s. Many people had an agricultural smallholding and supplemented their income by working as nailers or smiths, an example of a phenomenon known to economic historians as proto-industrialisation. In 1583, the accounts of the building of Henry VIII's Nonsuch Palace record that nails were supplied by Reynolde Warde of Dudley at a cost of 11s 4d per thousand. By the 1620s "Within ten miles [16 km] of Dudley Castle there were 20,000 smiths of all sorts".

In the early 17th century, Dud Dudley, a natural son of the Baron of Dudley, experimented with making iron using coal rather than charcoal. Two patents were granted for the process: one in 1621 to Lord Dudley and one in 1638 to Dud Dudley and three others. In his work Metallum Martis, published in 1665, he claimed to have "made Iron to profit with Pit-cole". However, considerable doubt has been cast on this claim by later writers.

An important development in the early 17th century was the introduction of the slitting mill to the Midlands area. In the Black Country, the establishment of this device was associated with Richard Foley, son of a Dudley nailer, who built a slitting mill near Kinver in 1628. The slitting mill made it much simpler to produce nail rods from iron bar.

Another development of the early 17th century was the introduction of glass making to the Stourbridge area. One attraction of the region for glass makers was the local deposits of fireclay, a material suitable for making the pots in which glass was melted.

In 1642 at the start of the Civil War, Charles I failed to capture the two arsenals of Portsmouth and Hull, which although in cities loyal to Parliament were located in counties loyal to him. As he had failed to capture the arsenals, Charles did not possess any supply of swords, pikes, guns, or shot; all these the Black Country could and did provide. From Stourbridge came shot, from Dudley cannon. Numerous small forges which then existed on every brook in the north of Worcestershire turned out successive supplies of sword blades and pike heads. It was said that among the many causes of anger Charles had against Birmingham was that one of the best sword makers of the day, Robert Porter, who manufactured swords in Digbeth, Birmingham, refused at any price to supply swords for "that man of blood" (a Puritan nickname for King Charles), or any of his adherents. As an offset to this sword-cutler and men like him in Birmingham, the Royalists had among their adherents Dud Dudley, now a Colonel in the Royalist army, who had experience in iron making, and who claimed he could turn out "all sorts of bar iron fit for making of muskets, carbines, and iron for great bolts", both more cheaply, more speedily and more excellent than could be done in any other way.

In 1712, a Newcomen Engine was constructed near Dudley and used to pump water from coal mines belonging to Lord Dudley. This is the earliest documented working steam engine.

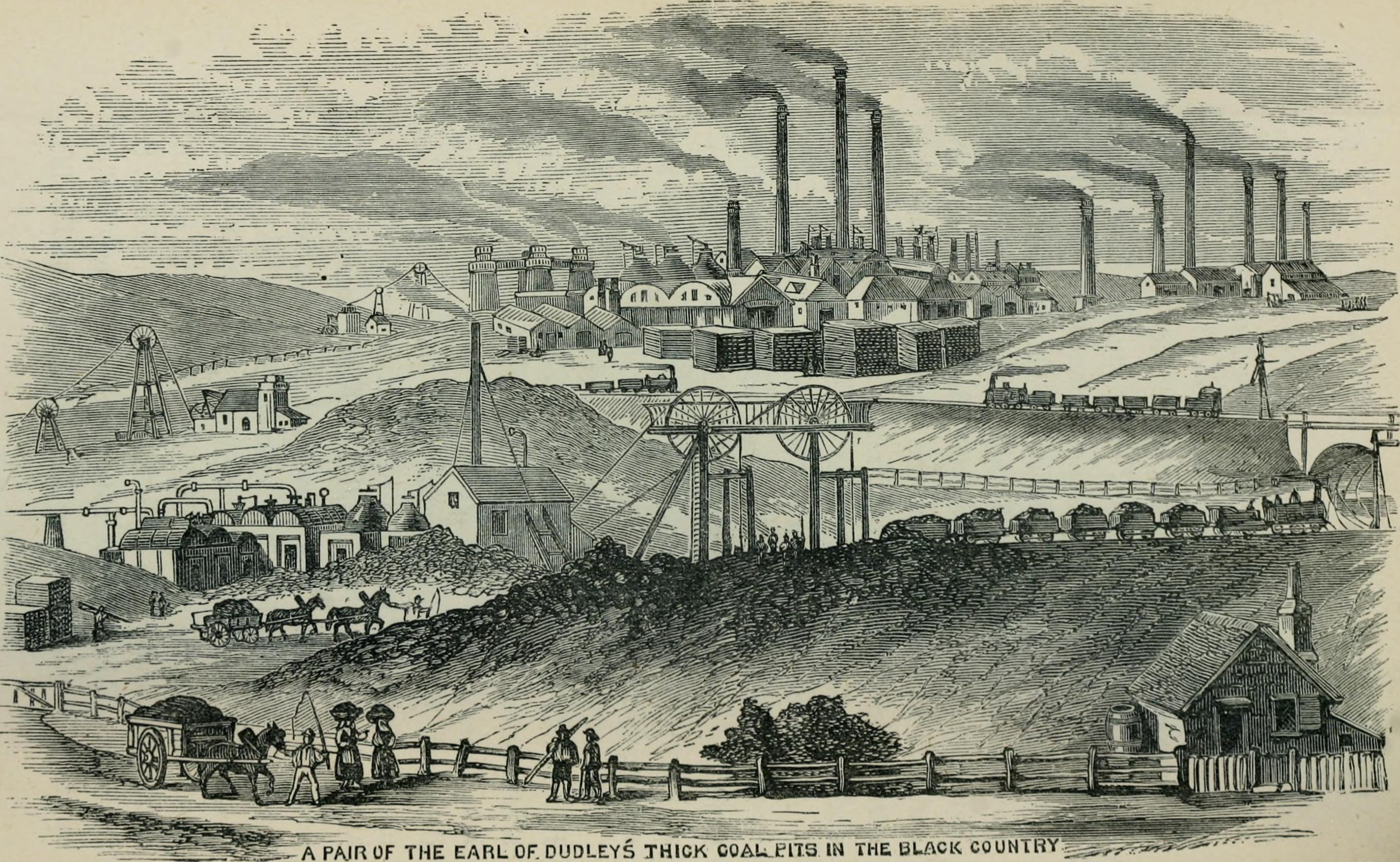
A Black Country scene from the 1870s including coal mines, mineral railways, furnaces and factories.

An important milestone in the establishment of Black Country industry came when John Wilkinson set up an iron works at Bradley near Bilston. In 1757 he started making iron there by coke-smelting rather than using charcoal. His example was followed by others and iron making spread rapidly across the Black Country. Another important development of the 18th century was the construction of canals to link the Black Country mines industries to the rest of the country. Between 1768 and 1772 a canal was constructed by James Brindley starting in Birmingham through the heart of the Black Country and eventually leading to the Staffordshire and Worcestershire Canal.

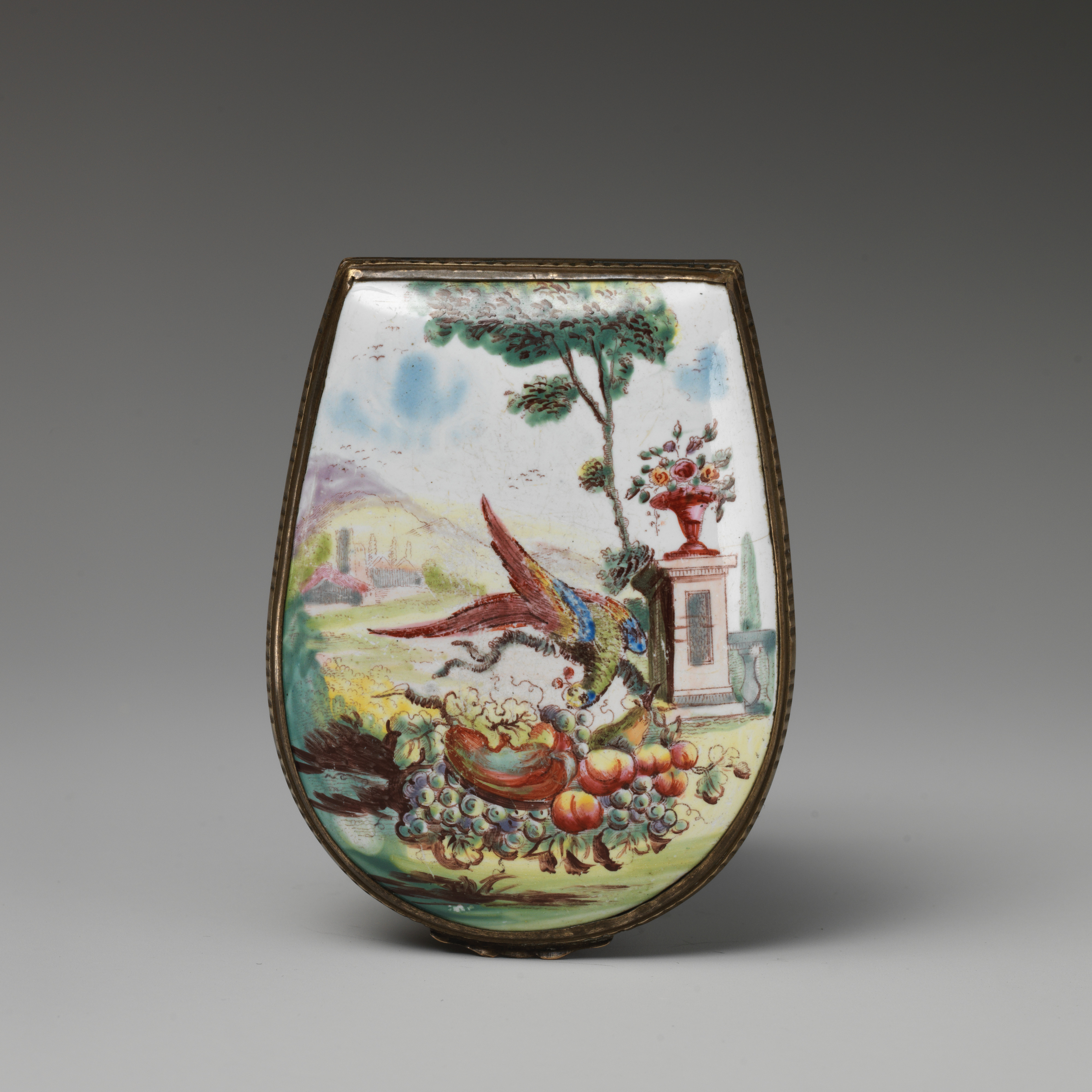
An 18th century enamelled snuff box made in Bilston, now in the collection of the Metropolitan Museum of Art, New York

In the middle of the 18th century, Bilston became well known for the craft of enamelling. Items produced included decorative containers such as patch-boxes, snuff boxes and bonbonnieres.

The iron industry grew during the 19th century, peaking around 1850–1860. In 1863, there were 200 blast furnaces in the Black Country, of which 110 were in blast. Two years later it was recorded that there were 2,116 puddling furnaces, which converted pig-iron into wrought iron, in the Black Country. In 1864 the first Black Country plant capable of producing mild steel by the Bessemer process was constructed at the Old Park Works in Wednesbury. In 1882, another Bessemer-style steel works was constructed at Spring Vale in Bilston by the Staffordshire Steel and Ingot Iron Company, a development followed by the construction of an open-hearth steelworks at the Round Oak works of the Earl of Dudley in Brierley Hill, which produced its first steel in 1894.

By the 19th century or early 20th century, many villages had their characteristic manufacture, but earlier occupations were less concentrated. Some of these concentrations are less ancient than sometimes supposed. For example, chain making in Cradley Heath seems only to have begun in about the 1820s, and the Lye holloware industry is even more recent.

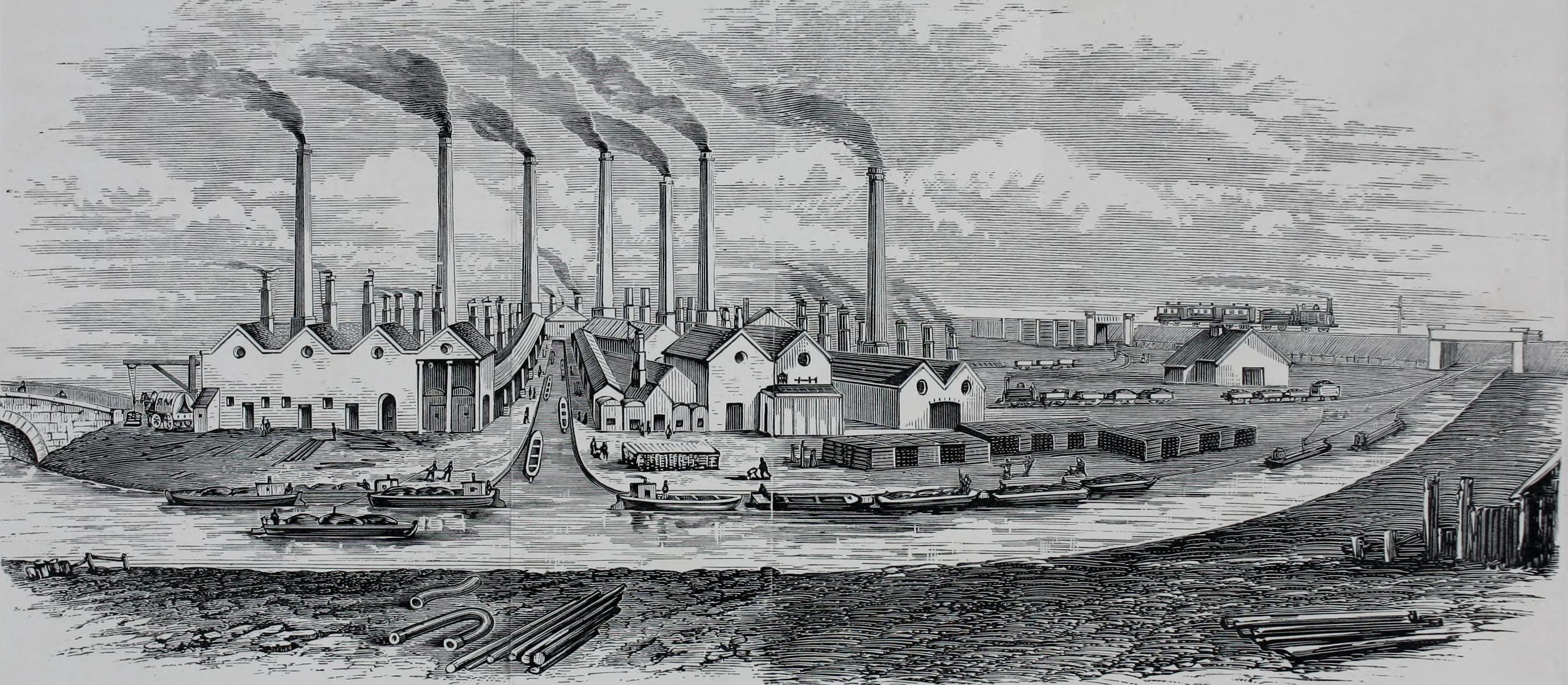
The ironworks of W. Barrows and Sons, Tipton. Canals were of crucial importance in the development of Black Country industry.

Prior to the Industrial Revolution, coal and limestone were worked only on a modest scale for local consumption, but during the Industrial Revolution by the opening of canals, such as the Birmingham Canal Navigations, Stourbridge Canal and the Dudley Canal (the Dudley Canal Line No 1 and the Dudley Tunnel) opened up the mineral wealth of the area to exploitation. Advances in the use of coke for the production of iron enabled iron production (hitherto limited by the supply of charcoal) to expand rapidly.

By Victorian times, the Black Country was one of the most heavily industrialised areas in Britain, and it became known for its pollution, particularly from iron and coal industries and their many associated smaller businesses. Industrialisation led to the expansion of local railways and coal mine lines. The line running from Stourbridge to Walsall via Dudley Port and Wednesbury closed in the 1960s, but the Birmingham to Wolverhampton line via Tipton is still a major transport route.

The anchors and chains for the ill-fated liner RMS Titanic were made in the Black Country at Netherton. Three anchors and accompanying chains were manufactured; and the set weighed in at 100 tons. The centre anchor alone weighed 12 tons and was pulled through Netherton on its journey to the ship by 20 Shire horses.

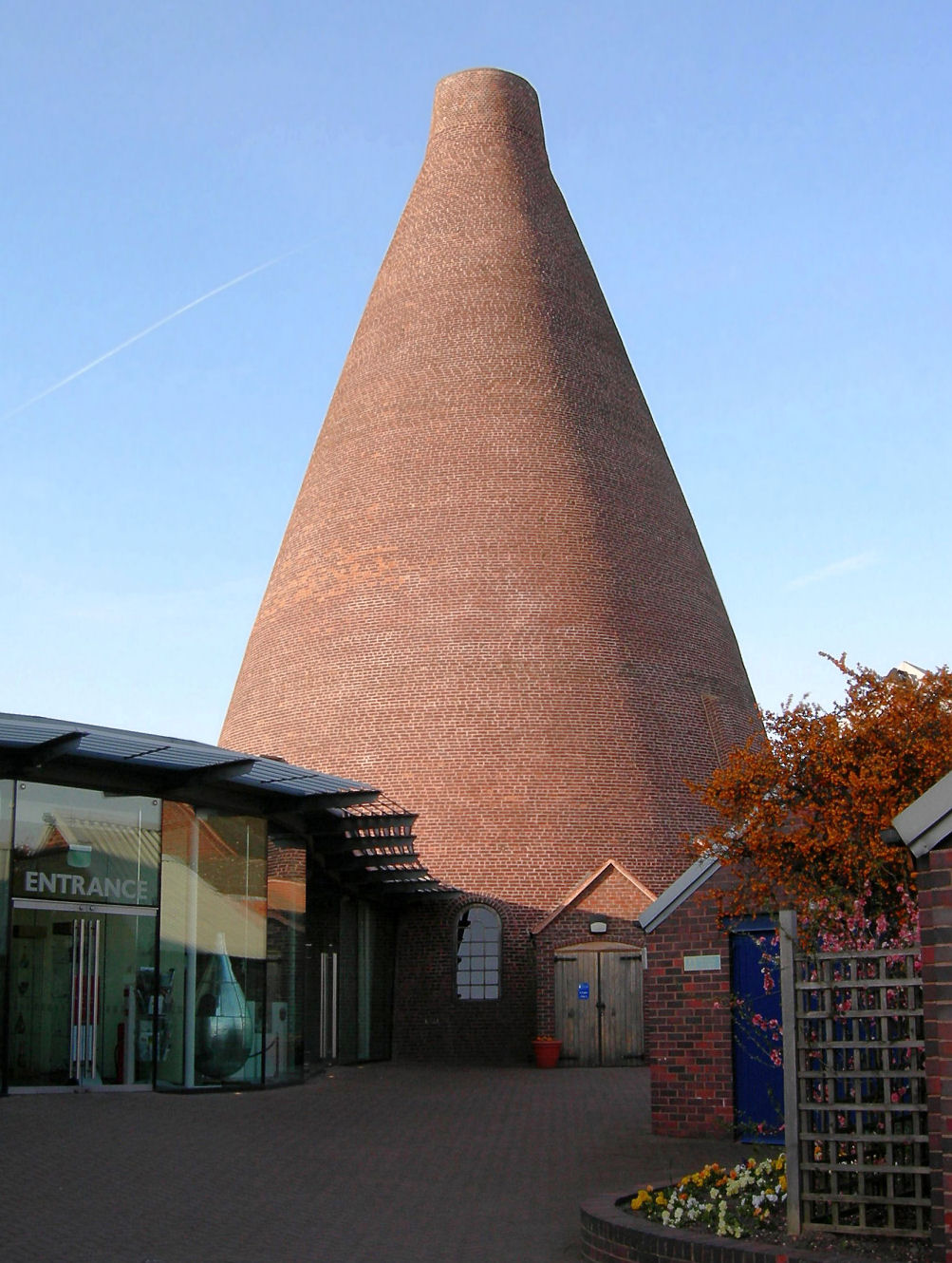
Glass cones where glass was made and worked were once a common sight in Brierley Hill, Amblecote and Wordsley. This example, now a museum, is in Wordsley near Stourbridge

In 1913, the Black Country was the location of arguably one of the most important strikes in British trade union history when the workers employed in the area's steel tube trade came out for two months in a successful demand for a 23 shilling minimum weekly wage for unskilled workers, giving them pay parity with their counterparts in nearby Birmingham. This action commenced on 9 May in Wednesbury, at the Old Patent tube works of John Russell & Co. Ltd., and within weeks upwards of 40,000 workers across the Black Country had joined the dispute. Notable figures in the labour movement, including a key proponent of Syndicalism, Tom Mann, visited the area to support the workers and Jack Beard and Julia Varley of the Workers' Union were active in organising the strike. During this confrontation with employers represented by the Midlands Employers' Federation, a body founded by Dudley Docker, the Asquith Government's armaments programme was jeopardised, especially its procurement of naval equipment and other industrial essentials such as steel tubing, nuts and bolts, destroyer parts, etc. This was of national significance at a time when Britain and Germany were engaged in the Anglo-German naval arms race that preceded the outbreak of the First World War. Following a ballot of the union membership, a settlement of the dispute was reached on 11 July after arbitration by government officials from the Board of Trade led by the Chief Industrial Commissioner Sir George Askwith, 1st Baron Askwith. One of the important consequences of the strike was the growth of organised labour across the Black Country, which was notable because until this point the area's workforce had effectively eschewed trade unionism.

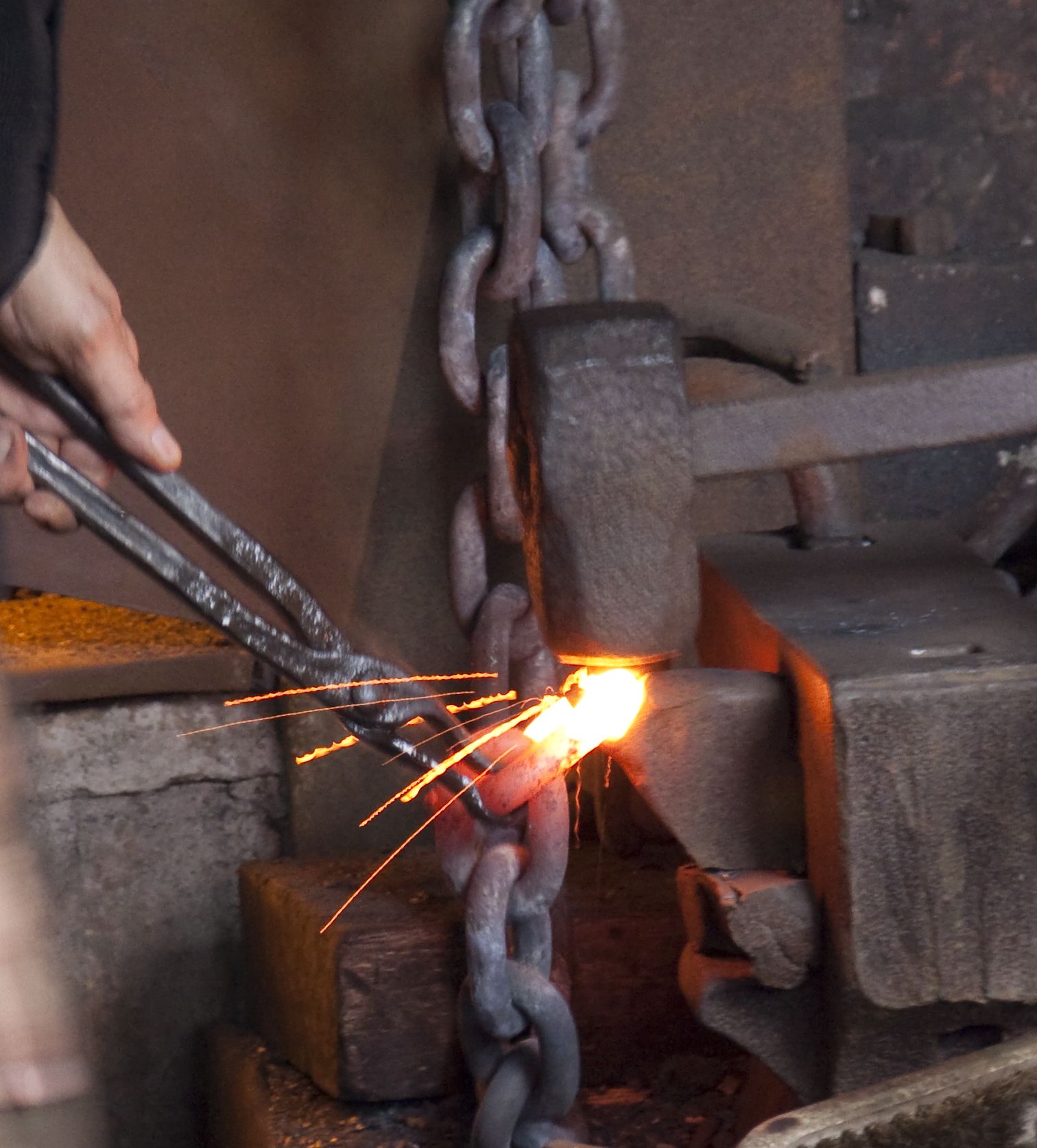
Chain making, once a major Black Country industry, as demonstrated at the Black Country Living Museum.

The 20th century saw a decline in coal mining in the Black Country, with the last colliery in the region – Baggeridge Colliery near Sedgley – closing on 2 March 1968, marking the end of an era after some 300 years of mass coal mining in the region, though a small number of open cast mines remained in use for a few years afterwards. Other industries thrived, however. Manufacturers like Rubery Owen, Chance Bros, Wilkins and Mitchell, GKN, John Thompson (company) and many more prospered from the post-war boom in Britain, with the West Midlands motor industry being a key driver of the economy. Wages rose faster than the national average, and unemployment remained low into the late 1970s. It was only in the late 1970s and 1980s, as global shocks and political change affected British industry, that the region began to become deindustrialised, with the years 1979-1982 witnessing the closure of large employers such as Bilston Steel Works, Round Oak, Patent Shaft Steelworks, Rubery Owen, Birmid Industries and others in quick succession. The population of the Black Country changed from one of the most prosperous industrial working-class regions in the country, to one of the most deprived.

As the heavy industry that had named the region faded away, in the 1970s a museum, called the Black Country Living Museum started to take shape on derelict land near to Dudley. Today this museum demonstrates Black Country crafts and industry from days gone by and includes many original buildings which have been transported and reconstructed at the site.

== Geology and landscape ==
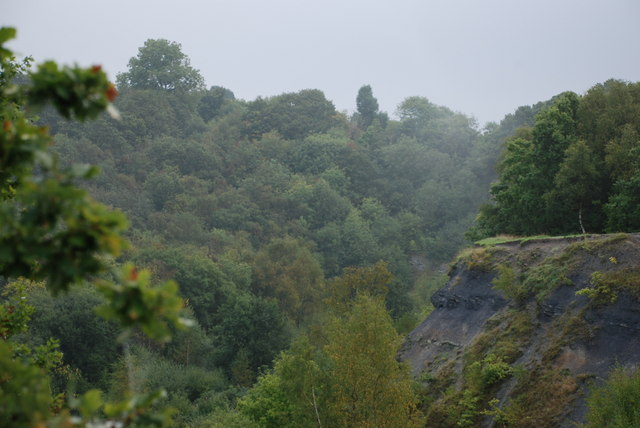
A dark seam of coal is clearly visible on the sides of Doultons Clay Pit, in Saltwells Wood to the south of Netherton

The history of industry in the Black Country is connected directly to its underlying geology. Much of the region lies upon an exposed coalfield forming the southern part of the South Staffordshire Coalfield where mining has taken place since the Middle Ages. There are, in fact several coal seams, some of which were given names by the miners. The top, thin coal seam is known as Broach Coal. Beneath this lies successively the Thick Coal, Heathen Coal, Stinking Coal, Bottom Coal and Singing Coal seams. Other seams also exist. The Thick Coal seam was also known as the "Thirty Foot" or "Ten Yard" seam and is made up of a number of beds that have come together to form one thick seam. Interspersed with the coal seams are deposits of iron ore and fireclay. The Black Country coal field is bounded on the north by the Bentley Fault, to the north of which lies the Cannock Chase Coalfield. Around the exposed coalfield, separated by geological faults, lies a concealed coalfield where the coal lies at much greater depth. A mine was sunk between 1870 and 1874 over the eastern boundary of the then known coal field in Smethwick and coal was discovered at a depth of over 400 yards. In the last decade of the 19th century, coal was discovered beyond the western boundary fault at Baggeridge at a depth of around 600 yards.

A broken ridge runs across the Black Country in a north-westerly direction through Dudley, Wrens Nest and Sedgley, separating the Black Country into two regions. This ridge forms part of a major watershed of England with streams to the north taking water to the Tame and then via the Trent into the North Sea whilst to the south of the ridge, water flows into the Stour and thence to the Severn and the Bristol Channel.

At Dudley and Wrens Nest, limestone was mined. This rock formation was formed in the Silurian period and contains many fossils. One particular fossilized creature, the trilobite Calymene blumenbachii, was so common that it became known as the "Dudley Bug" or "Dudley Locust" and was incorporated into the coat-of-arms of the County Borough of Dudley.

At a number of places, notably the Rowley Hills and at Barrow Hill, a hard igneous rock is found. The rock, known as dolerite, used to be quarried and used for road construction.

== Symbols ==
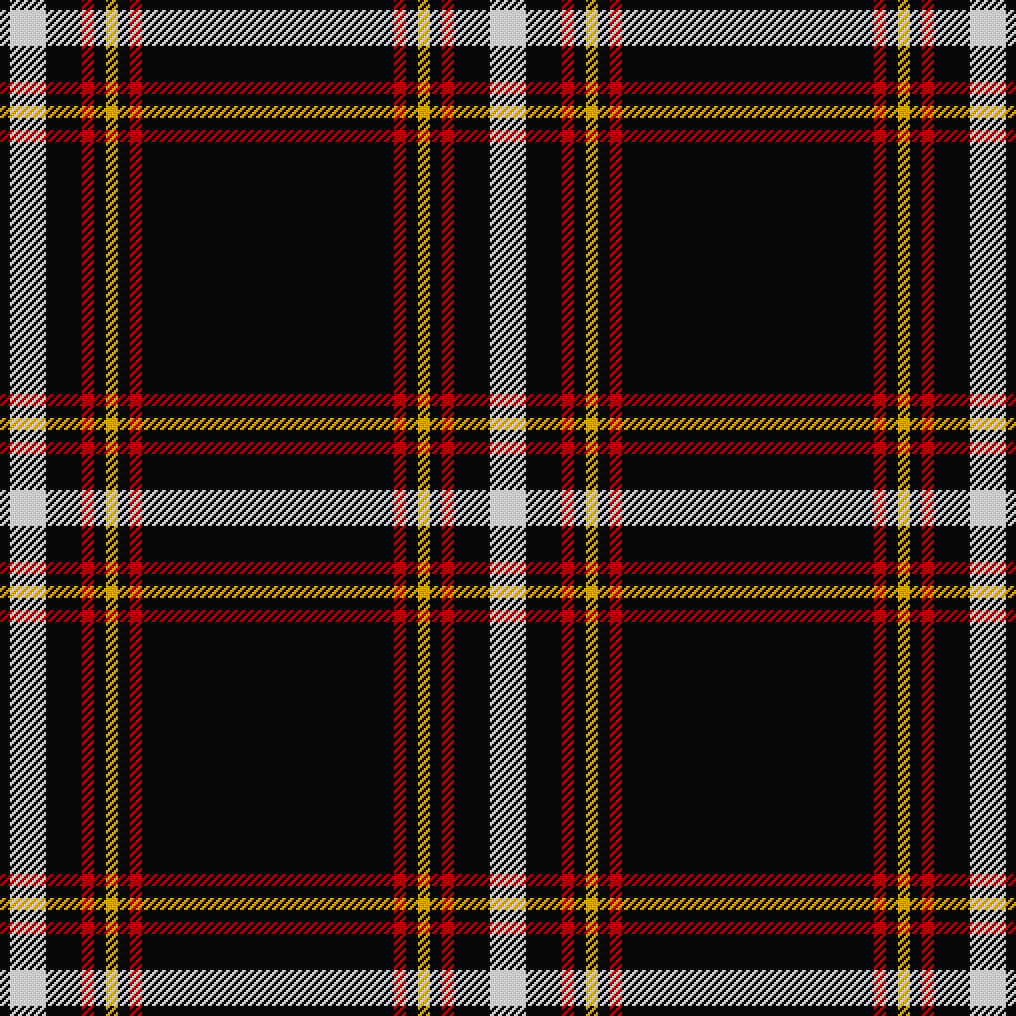
Black Country Tartan designed in 2008 by Philip Tibbetts from Halesowen

Flag of the Black Country, with colours representing Elihu Burritt's description of the region as "black by day and red by night", adopted July 2012

In recent years the Black Country has seen the adoption of symbols and emblems with which to represent itself. The first of these to be registered was the Black Country tartan in 2009, designed by Philip Tibbetts from Halesowen.

In 2008 the idea of a flag for the region was first raised. After four years of campaigning a competition was successfully organised with the Black Country Living Museum. This resulted in the adoption of the Flag of the Black Country as designed by Gracie Sheppard of Redhill School in Stourbridge and was registered with the Flag Institute in July 2012.

The flag was unveiled at the museum on 14 July 2012 as part of celebration in honour of the 300th anniversary of the erection of the first Newcomen atmospheric engine. Following this it was agreed by the museum and Black Country society for 14 July to be recognised as Black Country Day to celebrate the area's role in the Industrial Revolution. The day was marked by Department for Communities and Local Government in 2013 and following calls to do more in 2014 more events were planned around the region.

Black Country Day takes place on 14 July each year. Originally in March, the day was later moved to 14 July—the anniversary of the invention of the Newcomen steam engine—and now coincides with a wider series of events throughout the month aimed at promoting Black Country Culture called the Black Country Festival.

The Black Country Anthem was written by James Stevens and is performed by Black Country band The Empty Can. The idea for the anthem was raised in 2013 by James Stevens and Steven Edwards who wanted the region to have an official anthem to accompany the Black Country flag & Black Country Day.

== Economy ==
The heavy industry which once dominated the Black Country has now largely gone. The 20th century saw a decline in coal mining and the industry finally came to an end in 1968 with the closure of Baggeridge Colliery near Sedgley. Clean air legislation has meant that the Black Country is no longer black. The area still maintains some manufacturing, but on a much smaller scale than historically. Chainmaking is still a viable industry in the Cradley Heath area where the majority of the chain for the Ministry of Defence and the Admiralty fleet is made in modern factories.

Much but not all of the area now suffers from high unemployment and parts of it are amongst the most economically deprived communities in the UK. This is particularly true in parts of the metropolitan boroughs of Sandwell, Walsall and Wolverhampton. According to the Government's 2007 Index of Deprivation (ID 2007), Sandwell is the third most deprived authority in the West Midlands region, after Birmingham and Stoke-on-Trent, and the 14th most deprived of the UK's 354 districts. Wolverhampton is the fourth most deprived district in the West Midlands, and the 28th most deprived nationally. Walsall is the fifth most deprived district in the West Midlands region, and the 45th most deprived in the country. Dudley fares better, but still has pockets of deprivation. Overall, Dudley is the 100th most deprived district of the UK, but the second most affluent of the seven metropolitan districts of the West Midlands, with Solihull coming top. It also benefits from tourism due to the popularity of the Black Country Living Museum, Dudley Zoo and Dudley Castle.

As with many urban areas in the UK, there is also a significant ethnic minority population in parts: in Sandwell, 22.6 per cent of the population is from ethnic minorities, and in Wolverhampton the figure is 23.5 per cent. However, in Walsall 84.6 per cent of the population is described as white, while in Dudley 92 per cent of the population is white.

The Black Country suffered its biggest economic blows in the late 1970s and early 1980s, when unemployment soared largely because of the closure of historic large factories including the Round Oak Steel Works at Brierley Hill and the Patent Shaft steel plant at Wednesbury. Unemployment rose drastically across the country during this period as a result of Conservative Prime Minister Thatcher's economic policies; later, in an implicit acknowledgement of the social problems this had caused, these areas were designated as Enterprise Zones, and some redevelopment occurred. Round Oak and the surrounding farmland was developed as the Merry Hill Shopping Centre and Waterfront commercial and leisure complex, while the Patent Shaft site was developed as an industrial estate.

Unemployment in Brierley Hill peaked at more than 25% – around double the national average at the time – during the first half of the 1980s following the closure of Round Oak Steel Works, giving it one of the worst unemployment rates of any town in Britain. The Merry Hill development between 1985 and 1990 managed to reduce the local area's unemployment dramatically, however.

The Black Country Living Museum in Dudley recreates life in the Black Country in the early 20th century, and is a popular tourist attraction. On 17 February 2012 the museum's collection in its entirety was awarded Designation by Arts Council England (ACE). Designation is a mark of distinction that celebrates unique collections of national and international importance.

The four metropolitan boroughs of the Black Country form part of the Birmingham metropolitan economy, the second largest in the UK.

In 2011, the government announced the creation of the Black Country Enterprise Zone. The zone includes 5 sites in Wolverhampton and 14 in Darlaston. The i54 business park in Wolverhampton is the largest of the 19 sites; its tenants include Jaguar Land Rover. The largest site in Darlaston is that of the former IMI James Bridge Copper Works.

The four boroughs of Dudley, Sandwell, Wolverhampton and Walsall submitted a joint bid in late 2015 to become a UNESCO Global Geopark. The Geopark would increase the area's prospects as a tourism destination thereby supporting the local economy. To this end numerous 'geosites' were subsequently identified, leaflets published and public events organised. As of 2017, UNESCO had given the aspirant geopark its initial backing pending further assessment. Confirmation of the Black Country as a UNESCO Global Geopark was announced on 10 July 2020.

== Dialect and accent ==
The traditional Black Country dialect, known as "Black Country Spake" (as in "Where's our Spake Gone", a 2014–2016 lottery-funded project to preserve and document the dialect) preserves many archaic traits of Early Modern English and even Middle English and can be very confusing for outsiders. Thee, thy and thou are still in use, as is the case in parts of Derbyshire, Yorkshire and Lancashire.

"'Ow bist," or "Ow bist gooin" (How are you/ How are you going), to which typical responses would be "bostin', ah kid" (bostin' means "busting", as in breaking, and is similar in usage to "smashing"; and "ah kid" (our kid) is a term of endearment) or "'bay too bad," or even "bay three bad" ("I be not too bad"/ I'm not too bad).

Ain't is in common use as when "I haven't seen her" becomes "I ain't sid 'er". However, this is often shortened even further to "ay".

Black Country dialect often uses "ar" where other parts of England use "yes" (this is common as far away as Yorkshire). Similarly, the local version of "you" is pronounced /jaʊ/ YOW.

The local pronunciation includes "goo" (elsewhere "go") or "gewin'" is similar to that elsewhere in the Midlands. It is quite common for broad Black Country speakers to say "'agooin'" where others say "going." A woman is a "wench", a man is a "mon", a nurse is a "nuss" and home is "wum". An apple is an "opple".

Other examples are "code" for the word cold, and "goost" for the word ghost. A sofa becomes a "sofie", and a fag (cigarette), a "fake". Seen becomes "sid". Put together, "Ah just sid a goost, so Ah'm a gooin to sit on mah sofie and 'ave a fake" (I have just seen a ghost, so I am going to sit upon my sofa and have a cigarette)

Food may be called "fittle" (after victuals or "vittles"), so "bostin fittle" is "good food".

One participant in the "Where's our Spake Gone" project related the following: "Day say yom call oos rabbits up ere. I say we day, dey say yow say "Tah rah rabbits". We'm say tah-ra a bit, 'n to dem, it sound like we'm calling dem rabbits." ("They say you call us rabbits there, I said we don't, (but) they say you say "tah rah rabbits". We say "tah rah a bit" (tah rah for a little while) and to them, it sounds like we are calling them rabbits.")

== Depiction in art or literature ==
From the 19th century onwards, the area gained widespread notoriety for its hellish appearance, a depiction that made its way into the published works of the time. Charles Dickens's novel The Old Curiosity Shop, written in 1841, described how the area's local factory chimneys "Poured out their plague of smoke, obscured the light, and made foul the melancholy air". In 1862, Elihu Burritt, the American Consul in Birmingham, described the region as "black by day and red by night", because of the smoke and grime generated by the intense manufacturing activity and the glow from furnaces at night. Early 20th century representations of the region can be found in the Mercian novels of Francis Brett Young, most notably My Brother Jonathan (1928).

Carol Thompson the curator "The Making of Mordor" at Wolverhampton Art Gallery in the last quarter of 2014 stated that J. R. R. Tolkien's description of the grim region of Mordor "resonates strongly with contemporary accounts of the Black Country", in his famed novel The Lord of the Rings. Indeed, in the Elvish Sindarin language, Mor-Dor means Dark (or Black) Land.

The Black Country musical duo Big Special have released several tracks featuring lyrics that draw on the pair's experiences of working class life in the region. Their debut album Postindustrial Hometown Blues (2024) included several songs on the theme. The album's first track, "Black Country Gothic", begins with the vocal line, "They felt safe then, so I've heard, under their big, black blanket of industry."

== Brewing ==
The Black Country is notable for its small breweries and brewpubs which continued brewing their own beer alongside the larger breweries which opened in the Industrial Revolution. Small breweries and brewpubs in the Black Country include Bathams in Brierley Hill, Holdens in Woodsetton, Sarah Hughes in Sedgley, Black Country Ales in Lower Gornal and the Old Swan Inn (Ma Pardoe's) in Netherton. They produce light and dark mild ales, as well as malt-accented bitters and seasonal strong ales.

== Media ==
The Black Country is served by the regional television services - BBC West Midlands, ITV Central and Made in Birmingham. Three region wide radio stations that broadcast to the area are BBC Radio WM, Hits Radio Black Country & Shropshire and Greatest Hits Radio Black Country & Shropshire. Both Free Radio (formerly BRMB (Birmingham and Beacon Radio Wolverhampton) and Greatest Hits Radio Black Country and Shropshire (formerly Beacon 303, Radio WABC, Classic Gold Digital, Gold and Free Radio 80s) have broadcast since 1976 from transmitters at Turner's Hill and Sedgley, with the studios which were previously located in Wolverhampton being moved to Oldbury and Birmingham respectively.

The area also has three other radio stations which only officially cover part of the region. Black Country Radio (born from a merger of 102.5 The Bridge and BCCR) who are based in Brierley Hill, and Ambur Radio who broadcast from Walsall.

The Express and Star is one of the region's two daily newspapers, publishing eleven local editions from its Wolverhampton headquarters and its five district offices (for example the Dudley edition is considerably different in content from the Wolverhampton or Stafford editions). It is the biggest selling regional paper in the UK. Incidentally, the Express and Star, traditionally a Black Country paper, has expanded to the point where they sell copies from vendors in Birmingham city centre.

The Black Country Mail – a local edition of the Birmingham Mail – is the region's other daily newspaper. Its regional base is in Walsall town centre.

Established in 1973, from a site in High Street, Cradley Heath, the Black Country Bugle has also contributed to the region's history. It started as a fortnightly publication, but due to its widespread appeal, now appears on a weekly basis. It is now located above the Dudley Archives and Local History Centre on Tipton Road, Dudley.

== See also ==
- List of beer festivals in the Black Country
- Pays Noir (in French meaning "Black country"), referring to Sillon industriel, a similar early industrial region in Belgium.
- Seisdon Hundred
