= Holcroft baronets =

Set index for Holcroft baronets

There have been two baronetcies created for persons with the surname Holcroft, both in the Baronetage of the United Kingdom, and for members of the same family.

- Holcroft baronets of The Shrubbery (1905): see Sir Charles Holcroft, 1st Baronet (1831–1917)
- Holcroft baronets of Eaton Mascott (1921)
