= Thomas Holcroft (disambiguation) =

Thomas Holcroft was an English dramatist.

Thomas Holcroft may also refer to:

- Thomas Holcroft (died 1591), Member of Parliament (MP) for Midhurst
- Thomas Holcroft (politician) (1505–1558), English courtier, soldier, politician and landowner
- Thomas Holcroft (the younger) (died 1620), MP for Cheshire

== See also ==
- Holcroft (surname)
