= List of beer festivals in the Black Country =

This is a list of beer festivals in the Black Country that occur regularly, usually annually. The Black Country is a region in the Midlands of England. Although its boundaries are not precisely defined, for the purposes of this list, the Black Country will be defined as the extending over the 4 Local authority areas of Wolverhampton, Dudley, Sandwell and Walsall.

== List of beer festivals ==
- Black Country Beer Festival. Held in Lye, usually in August.
- Dudley Canal & Tunnel Trust Real Ale and Cider Festival. Summer event.
- Dudley Winter Ales Fayre. Usually held towards the end of November.
- Sedgley Real Ale and Beer Festival.
- Stourbridge Beer Festival. Usually held in early May.
- Walsall Beer Festival. Usually held in early March.
- Wolverhampton Beer and Cider Festival. Usually held in June.
