= John Holcroft (disambiguation) =

John Holcroft was a 17th-century politician.

John Holcroft may also refer to:

- John Holcroft (16th-century MP), for Lancashire
- John de Holcroft, 14th-century MP for Lancashire

== See also ==
- Holcroft (surname)
