= Black Country Bugle =

Newspapers published in the West Midlands, England

- Front cover of the Black Country Bugle's 9 February 2012 edition
- Type: Weekly newspaper
- Founder(s): Harry Taylor, Derek Beasley and David James
- Founded: 1972
- Circulation: 2,261 (as of 2022)
- Website: https://www.birminghammail.co.uk/all-about/black-country

The Black Country Bugle is a paid-for weekly publication, which highlights the industrial heritage, history, legends, local humour and readers' stories pertaining to the Black Country region, which forms the western half of the West Midlands conurbation of England.

== History ==
The paper was established in 1972 in Halesowen, by the founding editor Harry Taylor, and his co-partners Derek Beasley and David James. The trio had previously worked together on a free local paper, with Taylor editing the paper and writing the majority of the editorial, and Beasley and James selling adverts, as was the case in the early years of the Black Country Bugle. Taylor wrote in the launch issue in April 1972, "The Bugle will show you fascinating glimpses of our region's history, bring to vivid life its legendary characters, trace its antiquity and your ancestry over the centuries".

The Black Country Bugle moved its headquarters from Halesowen to Amblecote in 1983, and then in 1989 to High Street, Cradley Heath. In April 2015, the title moved to new offices within the Dudley Archives and Local History Centre on Tipton Road in Dudley. The publication, initially produced on a monthly basis, became a weekly in 1998, and in 2001 became part of Staffordshire Newspapers. Since 2012 the title has been part of Local World.

Rob Taylor, the son of Harry Taylor, the founder of the Bugle, took over as editor in 1993.

The 1000th edition of the paper was published in October 2011.

In 2012, Local World acquired owner Iliffe News & Media from Yattendon Group. In April 2013, John Butterworth MBE was appointed editor of the publication. Gary Phelps became editor-in-chief in July 2016. Charlotte Hart became executive editor in May 2018.

== Format and appearance ==
The paper is printed in a tabloid format, and since January 2012 has been printed in full colour on an improved quality paper stock, though the nostalgic nature of its content means that many of the photographs supplied are black and white.

== Content ==
Although the paper concentrates on the Black Country of former years, focusing on the local history and culture of the region, a certain amount of up-to-date local news is included. Amongst other things, the paper features photographs sent in by the public, curious objects brought into the Bugle office, short stories, anecdotes of olden days, historical essays, and letters and appeals from people researching their family trees. It often features articles and poems written in the Black Country dialect. A typical edition of the Bugle would have 2 or 3 photographs on the front cover contributed by readers, with some accompanying text.

== Staff ==
=== Editorial ===
Executive Editor

- Charlotte Hart

Writers

- Gavin Jones
- John Workman
- Dan Shaw

=== Regular columnists ===
Regular writers for the Bugle include: Gail Middleton, and Tony Matthews, who writes the history of the Black Country derbies. Dave Green contributes illustrations each week.
