= Rosemary Charlotte Holcroft =

South African botanical illustrator

Rosemary Charlotte Holcroft (née Temperley) (12 December 1942 Nairobi - 4 February 2000 Southport, Port Shepstone) was a South African botanical illustrator.

Rosemary was the daughter of Dr Bernard Nicholas Temperley, a Tanzanian geologist, who, after two years, returned to England. There he became discontented with English weather and the difficulties of post-WWII life in England, and returned to Kenya in East Africa. Rosemary finished her schooling at Msongari Loreto Convent in Nairobi.

In 1960 she left Kenya and joined the University of Cape Town Ballet School under Dulcie Howes, and was awarded a Diploma in Dance Teaching in 1963. She then gave ballet classes for seven years, at first in Pretoria and later in Cape Town.

Rosemary married Michael Roos a local artist in 1964, and a son, Marc, was born in 1972. During her stay in Cape Town she developed an interest in botanical illustration, resulting in 1965 in a number of pen and ink illustrations of ferns for Ted Schelpe of the University of Cape Town.

She settled in Pretoria in 1972, living with her parents who moved there after her father had retired. After viewing a Botanical Research Institute’s exhibition of botanical art at the Pretoria Art Museum in August 1973, she enrolled in a B.A. (Fine Arts) course at the University of South Africa. In 1974 some of her work was exhibited at the Association of South African Arts gallery in Pretoria to celebrate the eightieth birthday of Cythna Letty, and later that year some of her work was shown at the annual show of the South African Aloe and Succulent Society.

In 1975 she was appointed in a part-time capacity as a Senior Technician at the Botanical Research Institute - this marked the start of a 10-year period during which she proved to be a competent and productive botanical illustrator. Her contributions included 100 plates for the Flowering Plants of Africa, and 150 plates for the Flora of Pretoria. Her contributions also appeared in external publications such as the journal of the Cactus and Succulent Society of America. In 1976 she married again, on this occasion to Leslie Holcroft, an IT consultant.
