= Black Country Geopark =

UNESCO Global Geopark in England

Coordinates: 52°31′34″N 2°05′46″W

Black Country UNESCO Global Geopark
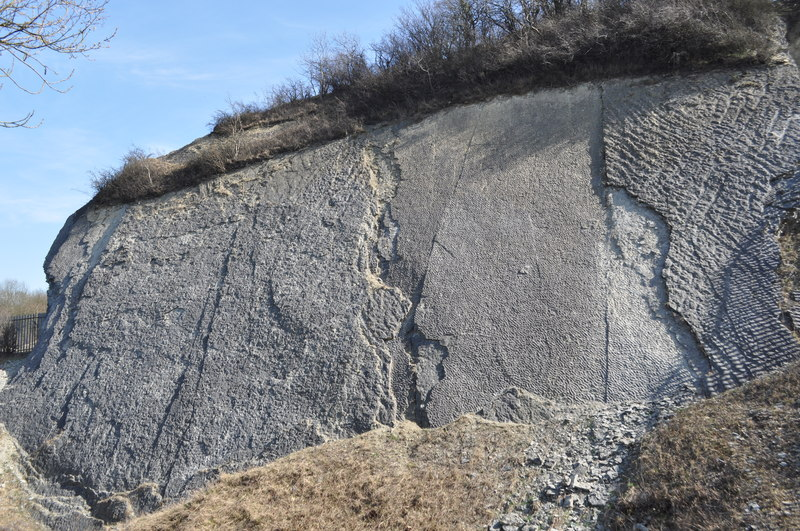
- Wren's Nest, at Dudley
- Interactive map of Black Country UNESCO Global Geopark
- Type: UNESCO Global Geoparks
- Location: Black Country
- Created: 10 July 2020
- Website: blackcountrygeopark.org.uk

The Black Country UNESCO Global Geopark is a geopark in the Black Country, a part of the West Midlands region of England. Having previously been an ‘aspiring Geopark’, it was awarded UNESCO Global Geopark status on 10 July 2020.

== Geology ==
The Geopark extends across territory underlain by sedimentary rocks of Silurian, Devonian, Carboniferous, Permian and Triassic age together with some limited outcrops of igneous rocks. Coal, ironstone, limestone, fireclay, brick clay and building stones have all been exploited in the area in the last few centuries. Evidence is also present for the margins of both the Anglian icesheet and the Devensian icesheet.

=== Silurian rocks ===
The oldest rocks which outcrop at the surface within the Geopark are the early Silurian shales and limestones which are seen in a series of faulted and folded inliers between Lye in the south and Ettingshall Park in the north. There is a further area of Silurian rocks exposed between Walsall, Gravelly Hill Interchange and Aldridge. The sequence locally (in stratigraphic order i.e. uppermost/youngest, at top):

- Raglan Mudstone Formation (mudstone and siltstone)
- Temeside Mudstone Formation (mudstone, siltstone and sandstone)
- Downton Castle Sandstone Formation
- Whitcliffe Formation (siltstone/mudstone/limestone, formerly Upper Ludlow Shales)
- Aymestry Limestone Formation (limestone/mudstone)
- Lower Ludlow Shales Group
- Much Wenlock Limestone Formation (comprises three sub-units; Lower Quarried Limestone Member, the Nodular Limestone Member and the Upper Quarried Limestone member each of which comprises both limestone and mudstone)
- Coalbrookdale Formation (green-grey mudstones, formerly known as the Grey or Wenlock shales)
- Barr Limestone Formation (grey limestone, mudstone)

The Barr Limestone is of Sheinwoodian age (433-430.5 Ma (million years ago)), the Much Wenlock Limestone of Homerian age (430.5-427 Ma) with the Coalbrookdale Formation being transitional between the two: all three formations are of Wenlockian age (c.433-427 Ma). The youngest three of the Silurian formations dates from the Pridoli epoch (423-419 Ma), towards the end of the period, and are regarded as the lowest/earliest part of the Old Red Sandstone succession in this region. The Much Wenlock limestones were extensively quarried at the Wren's Nest inlier. Dudley Castle is built upon a neighbouring inlier.

=== Devonian rocks ===
The Clee Sandstone Formation, which outcrops to the west and northwest of Sedgeley, originates in the Devonian period and is of Emsian age (c.408-393 Ma). The sandstone strata which dip moderately away to the northwest, form a part of the Old Red Sandstone succession. These rocks may be seen as outlying parts of the Anglo-Welsh Basin.

=== Carboniferous intrusive rocks ===
A series of dolerite and basalt intrusions occur within the Carboniferous sequence including the Brewin's Bridge microgabbro dyke, London Fields basalt sill and Rowley Regis microgabbro lopolith. Associated with these is a basaltic vent at Barrow Hill.

== Geography ==
The Geopark has been established across the entirety of the boroughs of Dudley, Sandwell, Walsall and Wolverhampton. As such it encompasses a wider area than the traditional Black Country, though the boundaries of this distinctive historic urban landscape within the West Midlands are difficult to pin down firmly. Originally more than a hundred individual villages, the area was at the heart of the Industrial Revolution of the eighteenth century. The name is said to derive from the blackened and scarred landscape which resulted from the intensive exploitation of its natural mineral wealth. The area overlaps the South Staffordshire coalfield.

Turner's Hill near the heart of the area reaches to 271m above sea level whilst the landscape rises to the 227m high viewpoint of Barr Beacon east of Walsall and, on its southern boundary, to a height of 224m at Wychbury Hill, a northern outlier of the Clent Hills. The area drains to the River Stour to the west, the Penk to the north and eventually to the Tame to the east via numerous tributaries. It is criss-crossed by canals including the Tame Valley Canal, Rushall Canal, Wyrley and Essington Canal, Dudley Canal, Stourbridge Canal, Birmingham Canal, Shropshire Union Canal and Staffordshire and Worcestershire Canal.

== Notable features ==
In 1956 Wren's Nest National Nature Reserve (NNR) became the first area in England to be designated as a national nature reserve for the geological interest of its bedrock, and remains a key ‘geosite’ within the modern Geopark. There are a further 16 SSSIs within the Geopark and 105 SINCs. The Dudley Canal and Tunnel Trust provides underground canal tours and a visitor centre. Castle Hill and Zoological gardens is a site of geological and cultural interest. Dudley Castle of motte and bailey construction dates back to the 11th century.

== See also ==
- UNESCO Global Geoparks
- List of National Geoparks
- Sustainable tourism
