= Cannock Chase Coalfield =

Coalfield in Staffordshire, England

Cannock Chase Coalfield is a coalfield in Staffordshire, England, lying directly under Cannock Chase. It forms a rough triangle between Brereton, Essington and Pelsall.

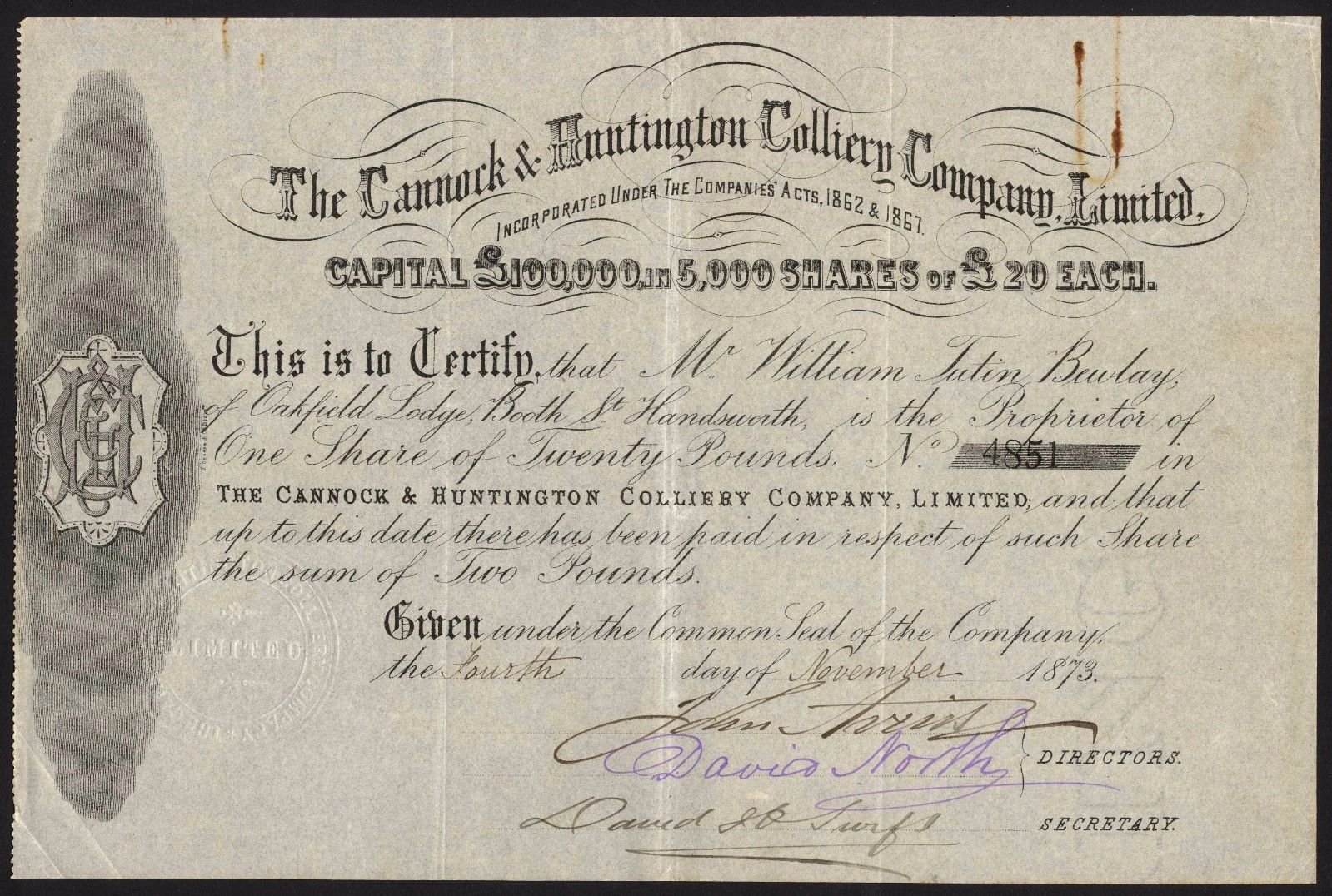
A Cannock & Huntington Colliery Co. Ltd. £20 share certificate, dated 1873

The Cannock Chase Coalfield lies just to the north of the South Staffordshire Coalfield, from which it is separated by the Bentley Fault. The seams under Cannock Chase are much deeper than those in South Staffordshire, being around 1,600 feet (490 m) near Rugeley, compared to around 800 feet (240 m) in South Staffordshire.

By 1890, the coalfield was producing 3 million tons of coal per year, and by 1933 this had risen to over 5 million tons.

The last working coal mine beneath Cannock Chase, Littleton Colliery, was situated in the village of Huntington, Staffordshire on the A34 and closed on 3 December 1993. Some of the coal from the mine was taken to power the nearby Rugeley Power Station.

== Archives ==
Historical records of Cannock Chase Colliery Company Limited, established in 1859, are held at the Cadbury Research Library (University of Birmingham).
