= Sir Charles Holcroft, 1st Baronet =

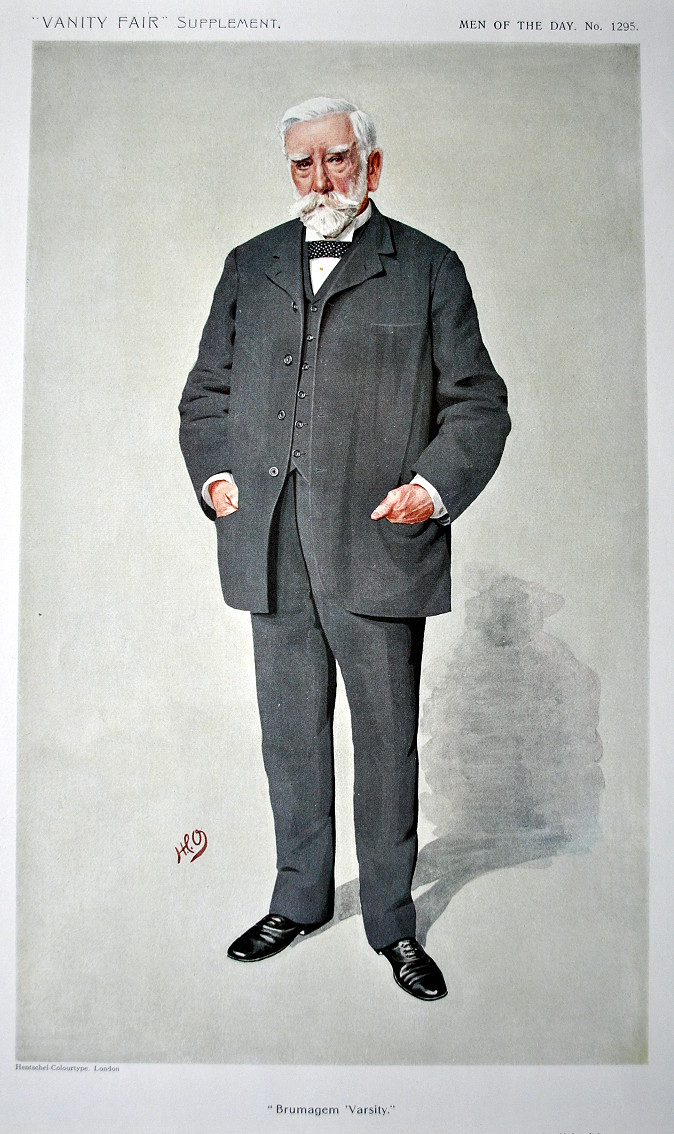
Sir Charles Holcroft, 1st Baronet, 1911 caricature from Vanity Fair

Sir Charles Holcroft, 1st Baronet (1831–1917) was a British iron and coal master. He was also known as a collector of fossils and a benefactor to the University of Birmingham.

== Life ==
He was born in Bilston, the son of Thomas Holcroft (1794–1865) and his wife Phoebe Sedgeley. It was a large family, with four sons and three daughters surviving their father. He was the youngest of those sons, and was later a business partner of the eldest, James. James's will of 1894 named the other brothers as William and Thomas; and the sisters as Mary, Sarah Hill and Catherine Henn. By her marriage to the Rev. John Henn, Catherine was mother to Percy Henn and Sydney Henn. Thomas Holcroft senior, in the cement and lime business, was in 1854 running the Deepfield Cement Company at Deedfields, near Coseley.

From 1848 Charles Holcroft worked in the drawing office at Tipton for the Engineering Works at Horseley Heath. After two years, in poor health, he gave up the position. He later returned to the firm, as a director.

In 1856, with his brother James, Holcroft took part in the development of the Cannock Chase Coalfield. Also with James, he set up J & C Holcroft, owning an iron foundry in the Dudley Port area of Tipton, and the Portfield Ironworks nearby. He became chairman of the Littleton Colliery, and a landowner. In 1891 he bought Eaton Mascott, a country house in Shropshire.

Holcroft gave £100,000 to the University of Birmingham, support solicited by Joseph Chamberlain. He died unmarried.

== Baronetcy ==
Escutcheon of Sir Charles Holcroft, 1st Baronet

The Holcroft baronetcy, of The Shrubbery in the Parish of Kingswinford in the County of Stafford, was created in the Baronetage of the United Kingdom on 28 July 1905 for Charles Holcroft.. The title became extinct on his death in 1917.

== Notes ==
Baronetage of the United Kingdom
| Preceded by Fison baronets | Holcroft baronets of The Shrubbery, Kingswinford; 28 July 1905 | Succeeded by Royden baronets |
