= Littleton Colliery =

Coal mine in the United Kingdom

Coordinates: 52.7135°N 2.0425°W

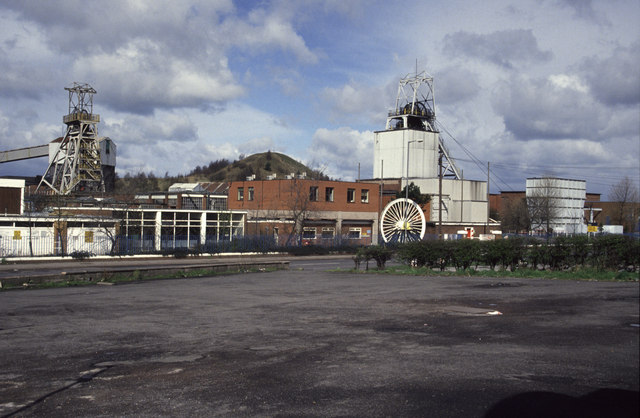
The colliery in 1994. The sheave wheel is preserved as a memorial.

Littleton Colliery was a deep coal mine situated two miles north of Cannock on the A34 in the village of Huntington. The colliery closed on 3 December 1993 and was the last working coal mine on the Cannock Chase Coalfield.

== History ==
The mine was named after Baron Hatherton, who had assumed the surname Littleton in 1812. The first workings at the mine, however, were conducted by the Cannock and Huntingdon Colliery Company in 1877. Upon sinking the first "No. 1" shaft, they encountered water at a depth of 438 ft (133 metres) and the shaft became flooded. Lord Hatherton, who owned the land on which the colliery was constructed, sunk the "No. 2" shaft in 1899 which was completed to a depth of 1,622 ft (494 metres).

In the 1960s, the colliery was modernised and equipped with skip winding. After this, the production regularly surpassed 1,000,000 tons in a year.

The colliery closed in 1993 following the overturning of a reprieve granted a year earlier. The colliery has now been completely demolished and the old site is shared between Littleton Green Community School and a housing development. The former spoil tip has been redeveloped into what is now known as Littleton Leisure Park and is an area for both walkers and wildlife.

One of the surviving steam locomotives that worked at the colliery, Littleton No. 5, is currently stored at Avon Valley Railway undergoing overhaul.
