= South Staffordshire coalfield =

Coal mining region in England

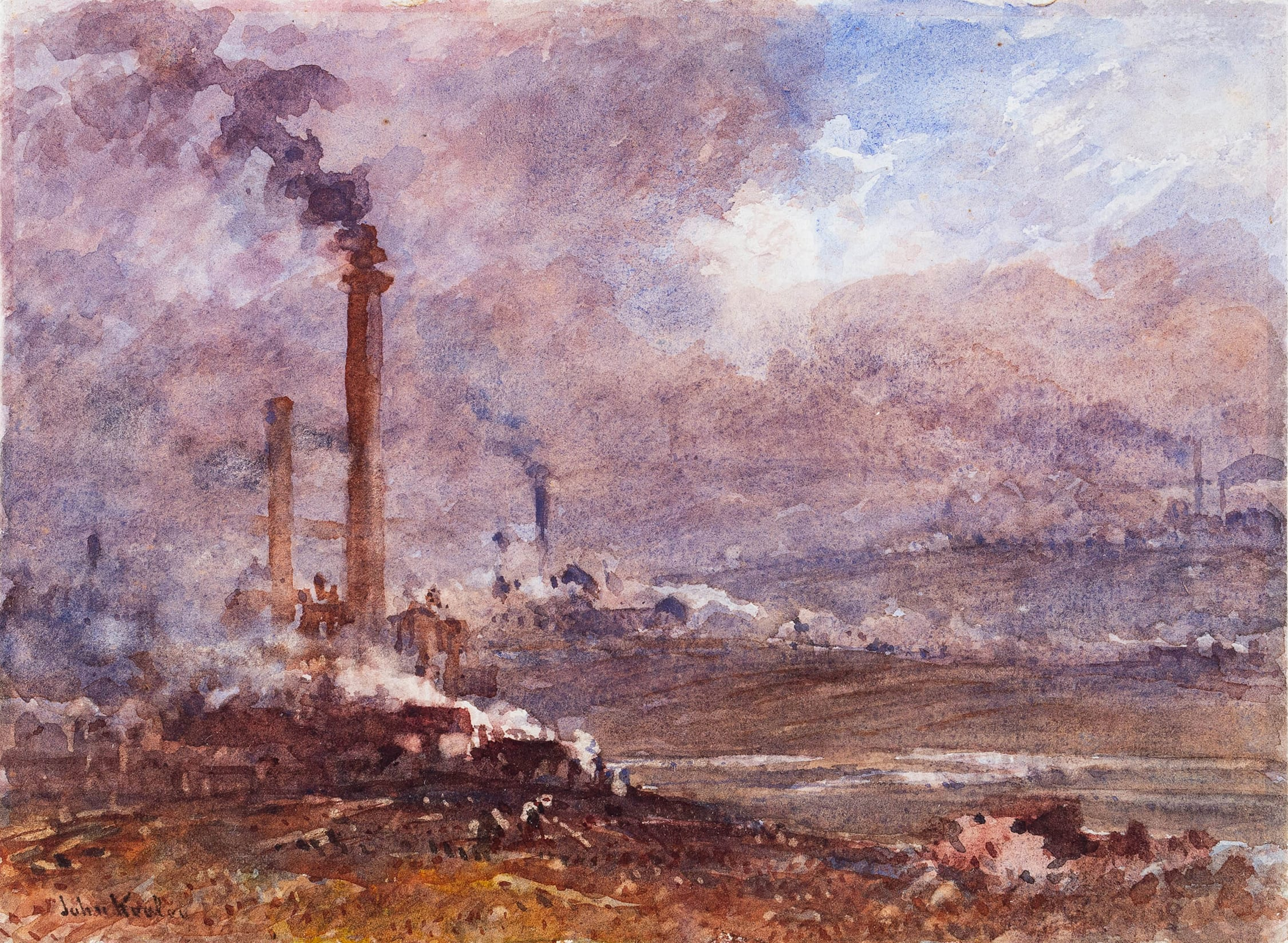
'Among the Coal Pits, Staffordshire’ by John Keeley

The South Staffordshire coalfield is one of several coalfields in the English Midlands. It stretches for 25 miles / 40 km from the Lickey Hills in the south to Rugeley in the north. The coalfield is around 10 miles (16 km) wide; its eastern and western margins are fault-bounded.

== Coal measures ==
Numerous coal seams are recognised within the coalfield - the following coal seams are recognised within the Cannock section of the coalfield - an area sometimes separately referred to as the Cannock coalfield or Cannock Chase coalfield:

- Middle Coal Measures
  - Top Robins
  - Bottom Robins
  - Charles
  - Brooch
  - Benches
  - Eight Feet
  - Park
  - Upper/Top Heathen
  - Lower/Bottom Heathen
- Lower Coal Measures
  - Yard
  - Bass
  - Cinder
  - Shallow
  - Deep
  - Mealy Greys

Within the southern part of the coalfield, fewer seams are recognised due to the 'Benches', 'Eight Feet' and 'Park' seams combining as the 'Thick' whilst the two 'Heathen' seams combine, the 'Yard' and 'Bass' seams combine as the 'New Mine' and the 'Cinder', 'Shallow' and 'Deep' combine as the 'Bottom';

- Middle Coal Measures
  - Brooch
  - Thick
  - Heathen
- Lower Coal Measures
  - New Mine
  - Bottom
  - ?Mealy Greys

== Iron ore ==
In addition to coal the South Staffordshire coalfield has been mined for its iron ore. In 1855, William Truran in The Iron Manufacture of Great Britain reported South Staffordshire to have sixty-five sites, a total of 169 furnaces and an annual production of around 950,000 tons of crude iron; the third largest producing area in Great Britain after South Wales and Scotland.

== See also ==
- Cannock Chase Coalfield
- Black Country Geopark
- Coal mining in the Black Country
