= Penn Halt railway station =

Rail station in South Staffordshire, England

Penn Halt
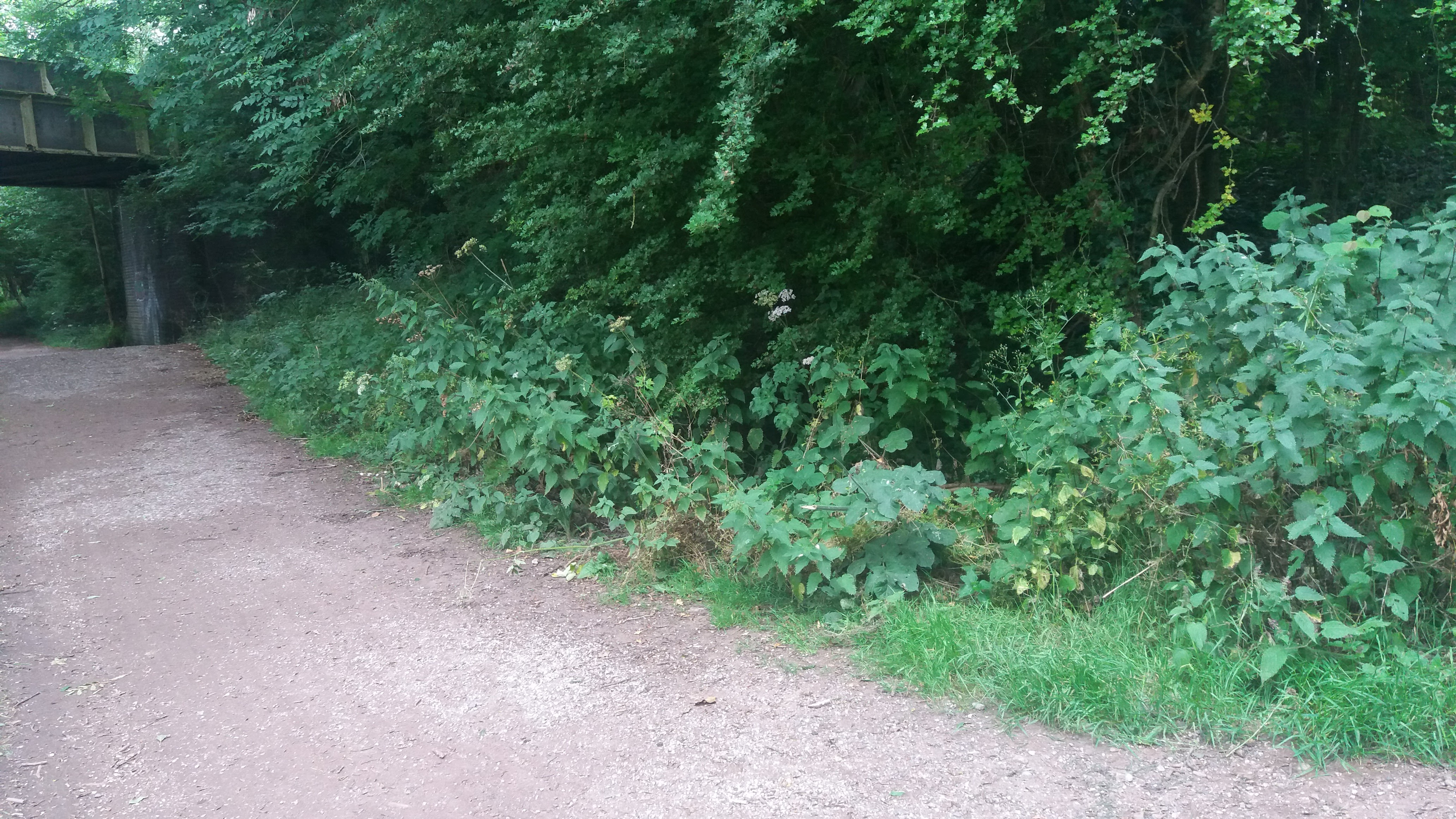
- Site of Penn Halt, nothing remains but the down ramp to the former halt

General information
- Location: Penn, West Midlands, South Staffordshire, Staffordshire; England
- Coordinates: 52.5635°N 2.2036°W
- Grid reference: SO863962
- Platforms: 1

Other information
- Status: Disused

History
- Post-grouping: Great Western Railway

Key dates
- 1925: Opened
- 1932: Closed
Location

Penn Halt was the smallest of all stops on the Wombourne Branch Line. It was opened by the Great Western Railway in 1925 and closed in 1932. The line was single track and the halt was a single platform. It suffered from poor patronage, as with all the stations on the branch. This may have been, in part, due to the somewhat strange positioning of the station by the GWR, several miles from the nearest settlement. All that remains is a lot of bushes and a sign stating where the halt once was.

This is now part of the South Staffordshire Railway Walk which covers the trackbed from Tettenhall railway station to Gornal Halt railway station.

Preceding station	Disused railways	Following station
Compton Halt	Great Western Railway "The Wombourne Branch" (1925-1932)	Wombourn
