= Himley railway station =

Former railway station in Himley, England

Himley
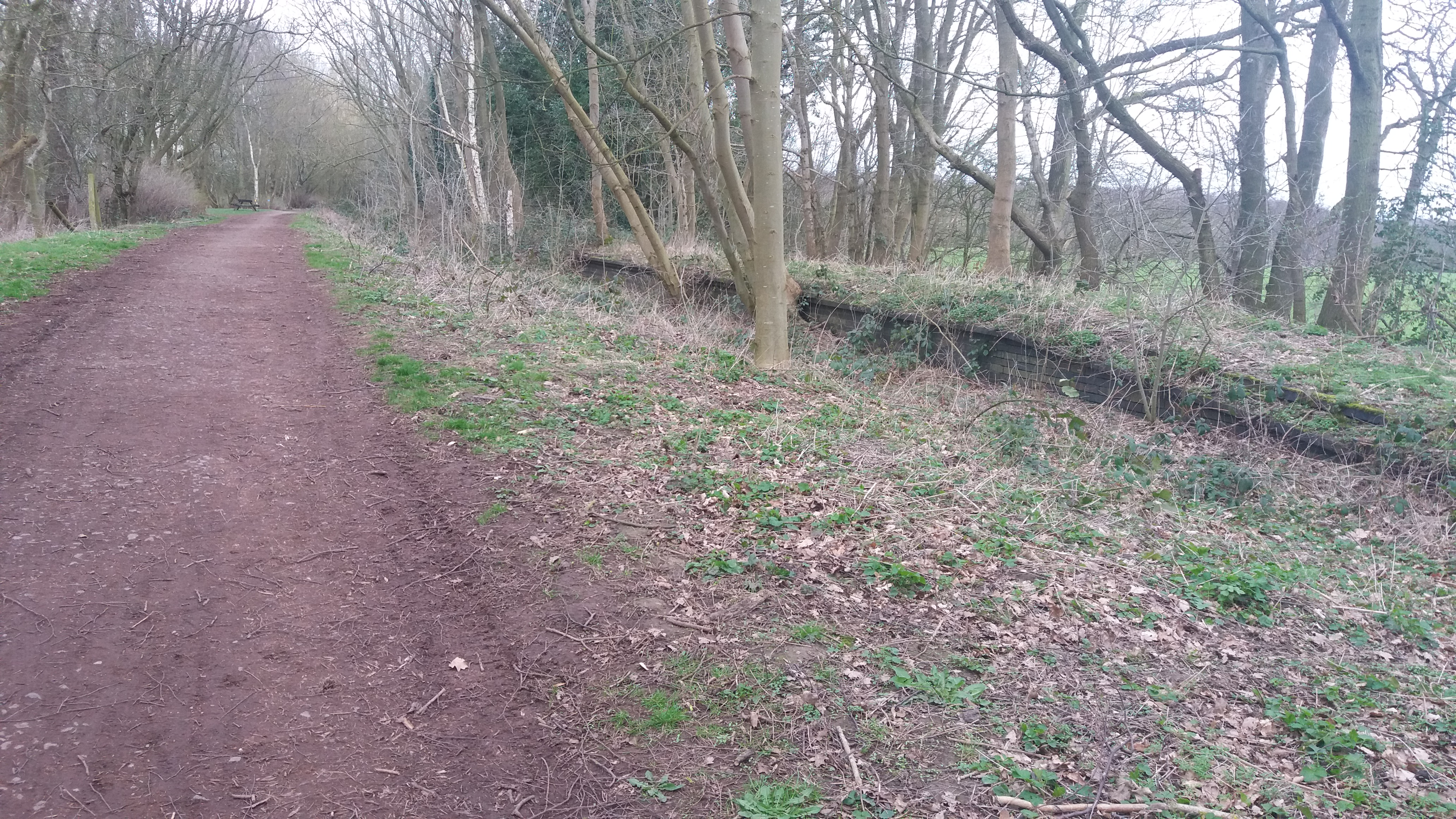
- Himley station site, only the platform remains and it is now a picnic site

General information
- Location: Himley and Swindon, South Staffordshire; England
- Coordinates: 52.5182°N 2.1875°W
- Grid reference: SO873911
- Platforms: 2 platforms built but only 1 used

Other information
- Status: Disused

History
- Original company: Great Western Railway
- Post-grouping: Great Western Railway

Key dates
- 1925: Opened
- 1932: Closed
Location

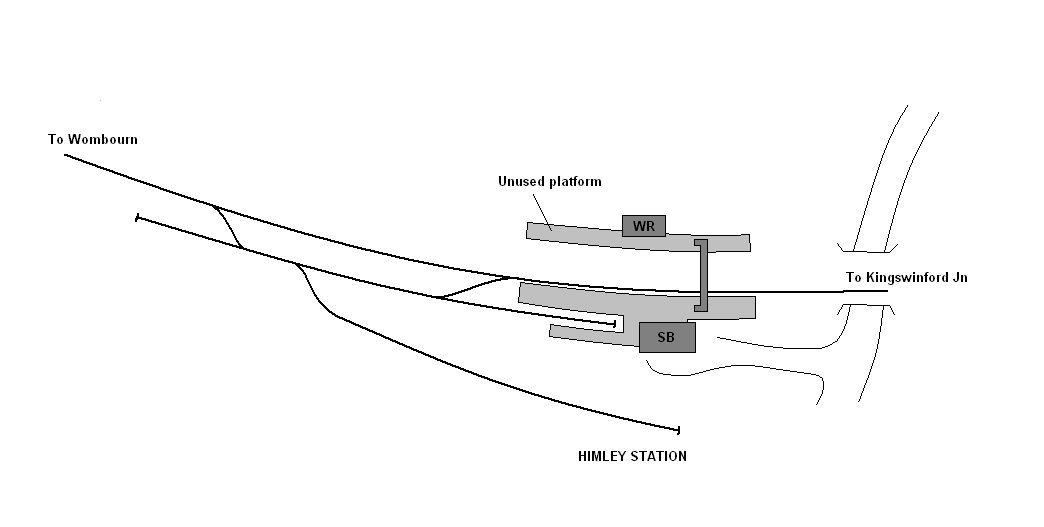
Himley station, circa 1930. Track was never laid on the Eastern platform.

Himley was a railway station on the Wombourne Branch Line. It served the villages of Himley and Swindon in Staffordshire, England. Unlike other stops along the route, it was deemed worthy of full station status. It was opened by the Great Western Railway in 1925 and closed in 1932. It served the community around Himley Hall.

A picnic area now stands on the site of the station. It is also part of the South Staffordshire Railway Walk but is the final stretch of track still in situ as after the site is a landfill site.

Preceding station	Disused railways	Following station
Wombourn	Great Western Railway "The Wombourne Branch" (1925-1932)	Gornal Halt
