= Tettenhall =

Historic village in Wolverhampton, England

Coordinates: 52.5983°N 2.1680°W

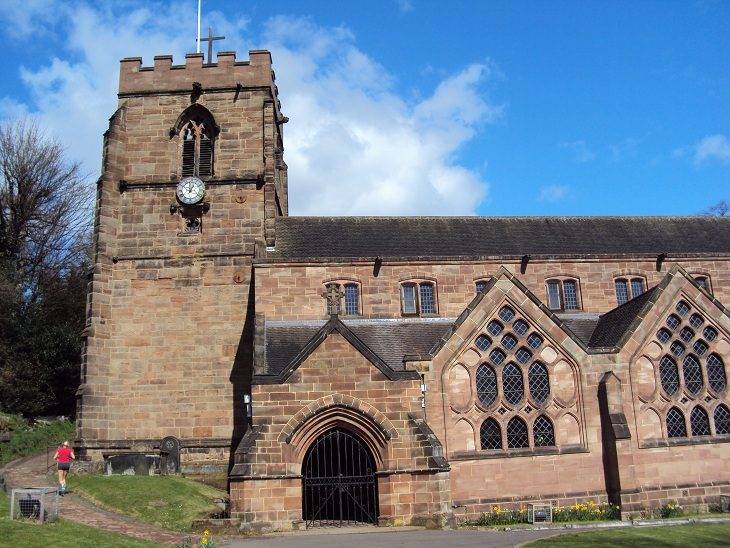
- St Michael and All Angels' Church

- Location within the West Midlands
- Population: 5,225 (2001 Census)
- Metropolitan borough: Wolverhampton
- Metropolitan county: West Midlands
- Region: West Midlands
- Country: England
- Sovereign state: United Kingdom
- Post town: Wolverhampton
- Postcode district: WV6
- Dialling code: 01902
- Police: West Midlands
- Fire: West Midlands
- Ambulance: West Midlands
- UK Parliament: Wolverhampton West

Tettenhall is a historic village within the City of Wolverhampton, West Midlands, England. Historically in the county of Staffordshire, Tettenhall became part of the Wolverhampton borough in 1966, along with Bilston, Wednesfield and parts of Willenhall, Coseley and Sedgley.

== History ==
Tettenhall's name derives from the Old English Teottanhalh, meaning "nook of land belonging to a man named Teotta". The original halh was likely situated in the sheltered area below the ridge where the church stands. This area, around Lower Green, was the original inhabited area of Tettenhall. In early English (Anglo-Saxon) times, as the place name evidence tells us, there were many cleared woodland areas – areas where field and settlement would have been commonplace. These can be seen today by the place name ending "ley", from early English "lēah", meaning woodland clearing; Wrottesley being one such example in the local area. Where most of the land was wooded, below the ridge ran, as it does today, the river Smestow - though at this time, it was a larger stream than it is today, running through extensive marshy ground.

The Battle of Tettenhall in 910 was the turning point in the battle against the Danish Viking invaders by the united forces of Edward the Elder of Wessex and Ealdorman Æthelred of Mercia. It saw the crushing defeat of the last of the large Danish Viking armies to ravage England, including the deaths of the Danish Kings, Eowils and Healfdan. In more recent times, the north part of the village became known as "Danescourt".

Tettenhall has an old parish church, St Michael and All Angels, located at the base of the ridge, leading off Lower Green. An exact founding date for it is not known, though records of a fourteenth-century dispute over village land tell us that the church had been founded during the reign of King Edgar, at some point between 959 and 975 AD. The Domesday Book of 1086 informs that before the Norman Conquest, Tettenhall was held by three Englishmen – Hunta, Wulfstan, and Godwin. Of course, as with the majority of England, post-conquest, William the Conqueror gave the land to his followers.

There is a variety of pear known as 'Tettenhall Dick', named after Tettenhall, originally found in the hamlet of Perton and dating to earlier than the 18th century. These small, dry pears are traditionally used for the making of perry. The Bees & Trees charity began a scheme to plant 2,000 Tettenhall Dick trees across the Midlands in a bid to save them, as very few of them existed any more. These trees were grafted from existing Tettenhall Dick trees, and the scheme has proven to be a success, with trees being planted in a variety of different locations. The variety is now part of the National Fruit Collection at Brogdale in Kent.

The original route of the London to Holyhead road ran through Tettenhall, though on a different course from the current A41 Tettenhall Road. The road, when heading north east from Wolverhampton, ran behind the shops at Newbridge, on bridges over the Staffordshire and Worcestershire Canal (when built in 1772) and the river Smestow, then across to Old Hill, where there was a steep climb for any carriages on route. The road then cut across Upper Green, swayed left into Wrottesley Road as far as Woodthorne Road, and then continuing on as the present Wergs Road. This route, because of the problems associated with carriages traversing the steep Old Hill, was looked at in the early 19th century by the Wolverhampton Trust and Thomas Telford, with a view to engineering a new route – either around, under, or through the ridge. Due to a dispute, Thomas Telford dropped out of the plans, leaving the Wolverhampton Trust to go it alone. The preferred method was a cutting through the ridge, with the course of the road sloping up on a gradual gradient from near the Newbridge area, cutting through and rising above Lower Green, before the direct cutting through the ridge to come out next to Upper Green. The spoil from the cutting through the ridge is what was used to create the incline of the road. Work was completed in 1823.

Tettenhall waterworks is a large water pumping station built between 1845 and 1908 which held Bull, Cornish and triple-expansion steam engines. It was designed for the Wolverhampton Waterworks Company by engineer Henry Marten. The company was taken over by Wolverhampton Corporation in 1867.

== Village greens ==
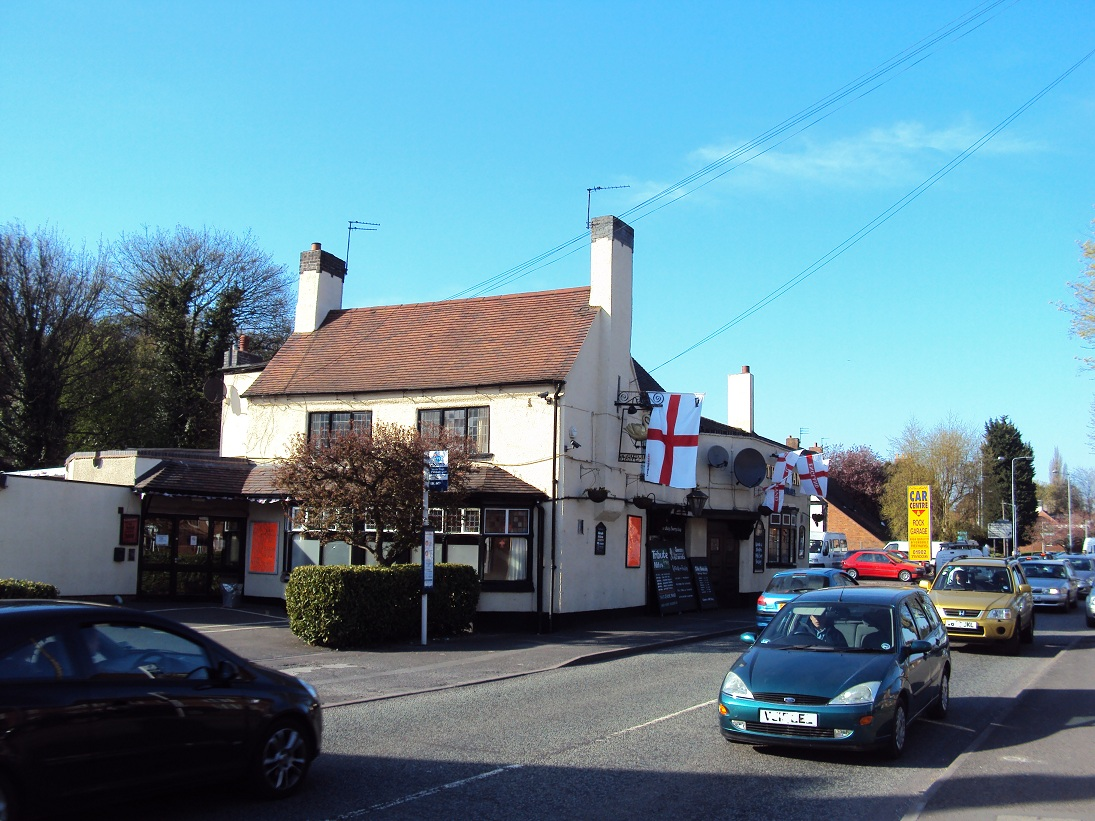
The Swan Hotel, Lower Street, Tettenhall

Tettenhall is one of the few places in England to have two village greens. Tettenhall Upper Green is situated on high ground near the edge of a ridge that runs in a broadly east–west direction, from Aldersley to Perton. The Upper Green has a large paddling pool, an extensive open grass area, a cricket pitch, practice nets and the Wolverhampton Cricket Club Ground, where W. G. Grace visited and played. The area is common land that was donated by the local Swindley family to the people of the parish. A clock tower, built in 1912 also by the Swindley family and donated to the parish to celebrate the coronation of King George V, is a key landmark in Upper Green.

Tettenhall Lower Green is at the bottom of The Rock, near St. Michael and All Angels Church. It is a sloping grassy area that is popular for sledging on snowy winter days.

The A41 road runs through the village green as a single-carriageway road. Despite the relatively close proximity to Wolverhampton's city centre, Tettenhall retains its rural village character and a strong sense of identity among its residents.

== Governance ==
Tettenhall became an urban district in 1894, the district only contained the civil parish of Tettenhall. On 1 April 1966 the district was abolished and merged with the County Borough of Wolverhampton and Seisdon Rural District. The parish was also abolished on 1 April 1966 and merged with Wolverhampton, Codsall, Lower Penn and Wrottesley. In 1961 the parish had a population of 14,867.

The village has tried to gain independence from Wolverhampton Council and has made plans to return to a parish council but this has no longer been pursued.

Two electoral wards of Wolverhampton City Council cover Tettenhall; Tettenhall Regis (the northern part) and Tettenhall Wightwick (the southern part).

== Notable people ==
- Francis Smith of Warwick (1672–1738), the architect, was son of Francis Smith of The Wergs near Tettenhall. (He became identified with Warwick through setting up business in that town, which he helped rebuild after the Great Fire of Warwick in 1694.)
- Button Gwinnett (1735–1777) who later emigrated to America where he became the second signer of the United States Declaration of Independence had two daughters who were buried in St Michael's churchyard in 1759 and 1762.
- Billy Harrison (1886–1948), footballer played 412 games, incl. 317 for Wolves, ran a pub in the village after retiring.
- Hugh Porter (born 1940), professional track cyclist and commentator, and his wife Anita Lonsbrough (born 1941), 1960 Summer Olympics gold medal swimmer, live in Tettenhall.
- Mark Speight (1965–2008), children's TV presenter was from Tettenhall. His ashes are interred in the parish churchyard.

== Education ==
Tettenhall College is a private school based in Tettenhall Towers, the former home of the Thorneycroft family.

St Regis Church of England Academy is a Church of England school for 11- to 19-year-olds. As part of the BSF programme, the school was refurbished and now incorporates Tettenhall Wood Special School onto its site.

Christ Church Infants and Juniors are linked to the church of the same name, situated in Tettenhall Wood.

St Michael's CofE School and Woodthorne Primary School are also located here.

== Transport ==
Tettenhall has strong connections to Wolverhampton and Dudley with bus service 1 running every 9 minutes in the week and a 20-minute frequency on evenings and Sundays. Service 1 is operated by National Express West Midlands and also Let's Go. There are also buses to Compton (10/10A) and Telford (891).

Tettenhall used to be served by three railway stations on the former Wombourne Branch Line, namely Dunstall Park, Tettenhall and Compton Halt but today the nearest railway stations to the village are Wolverhampton and Bilbrook. Since 2019 proposals have been made to open a new station on the edge of Tettenhall on the Wolverhampton–Shrewsbury line.

The Tettenhall Transport Heritage Centre is the first transport museum in the City of Wolverhampton and is found in Tettenhall.
