= Pensnett Halt railway station =

Former railway station in England

Pensnett Halt
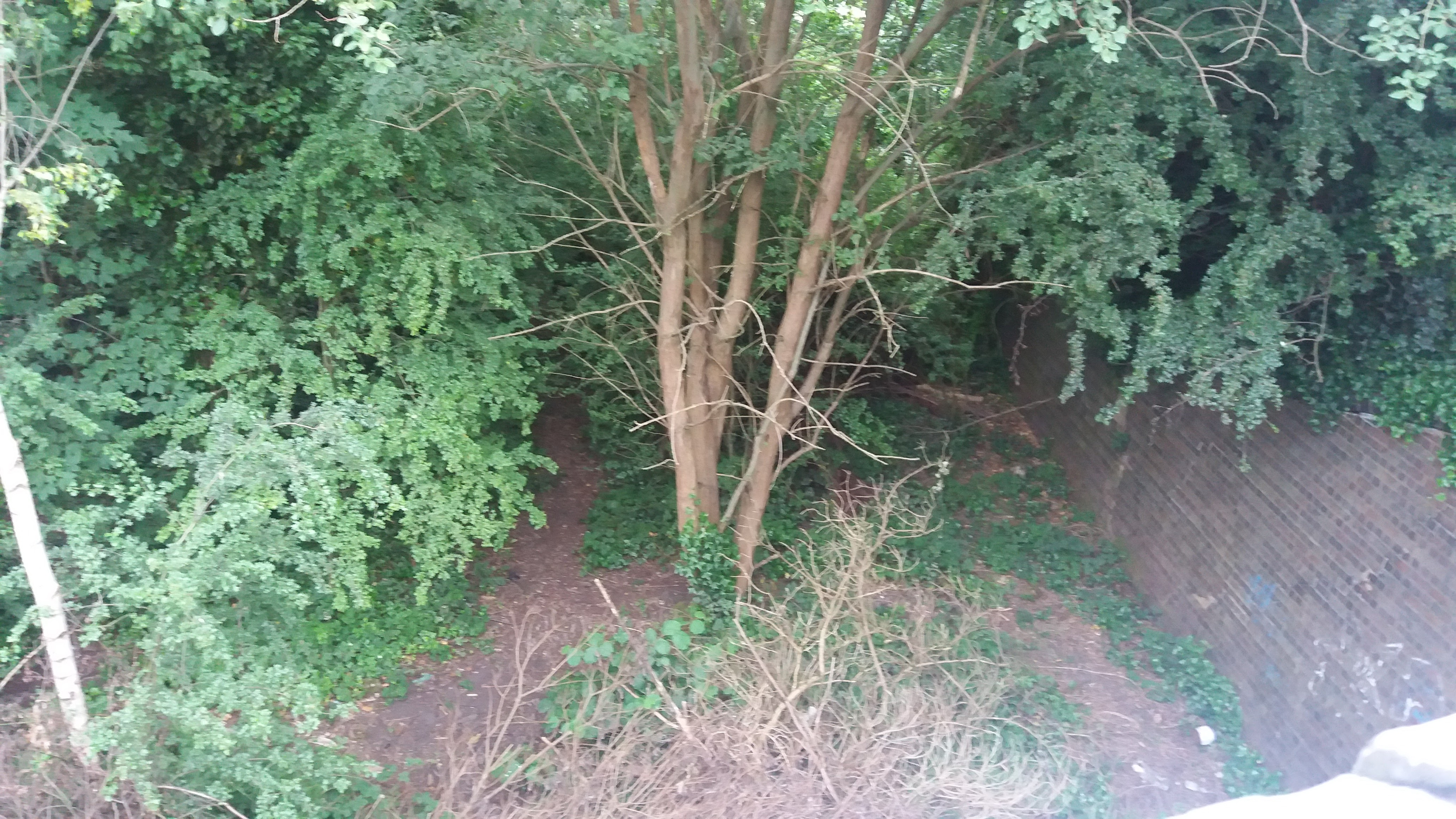
- Looking towards the site of Pensnett Halt from High Street road bridge.

General information
- Location: Pensnett, Dudley; England
- Coordinates: 52.5018°N 2.1425°W
- Grid reference: SO904893
- Platforms: 2

Other information
- Status: Disused

History
- Post-grouping: Great Western Railway

Key dates
- 11 May 1925: Opened
- 31 October 1932: Closed
Location

Pensnett Halt was a small railway stop on the Wombourne Branch Line. It was opened by the Great Western Railway in 1925 and closed in 1932. The halt served the small town of Pensnett.

The sidings around the station survived until about 1994, thanks to the Perrier distribution centre. The line north of these sidings has now been lifted.

The trackbed between Gornal Halt and Pensnett Halt has become a wasteland with the bridge that took the line under High Street and towards Tansey Green Road being fenced off and has since been overgrown. At one point, the line from Pensnett Halt to Brockmoor Halt railway station became a footpath but has since been hardly used and is now overgrown with only the single track that carried the line to Gornal Halt still in situ and a steep, dangerous footpath from Gibbons Lane.

| Preceding station | Disused railways | Following station |
|---|---|---|
| Gornal Halt | Great Western Railway "The Wombourne Branch" (1925-1932) | Bromley Halt |
