= Bromley station =

Bromley station may refer to:

- Bromley Cross railway station, Greater Manchester, UK
- Bromley-by-Bow tube station (formerly Bromley railway station), East London
- Bromley North railway station, South London
- Bromley South railway station, South London

== Disused stations ==
- Bow Road railway station, East London (formerly Bow and Bromley)
- South Bromley railway station, East London
- Bromley Halt railway station, disused station in the West Midlands, UK

== See also ==
- Brockley railway station, South London
- Bristol and North Somerset Railway, served but no station at Bromley Colliery
