= Compton Halt railway station =

Former railway station in England

Compton Halt
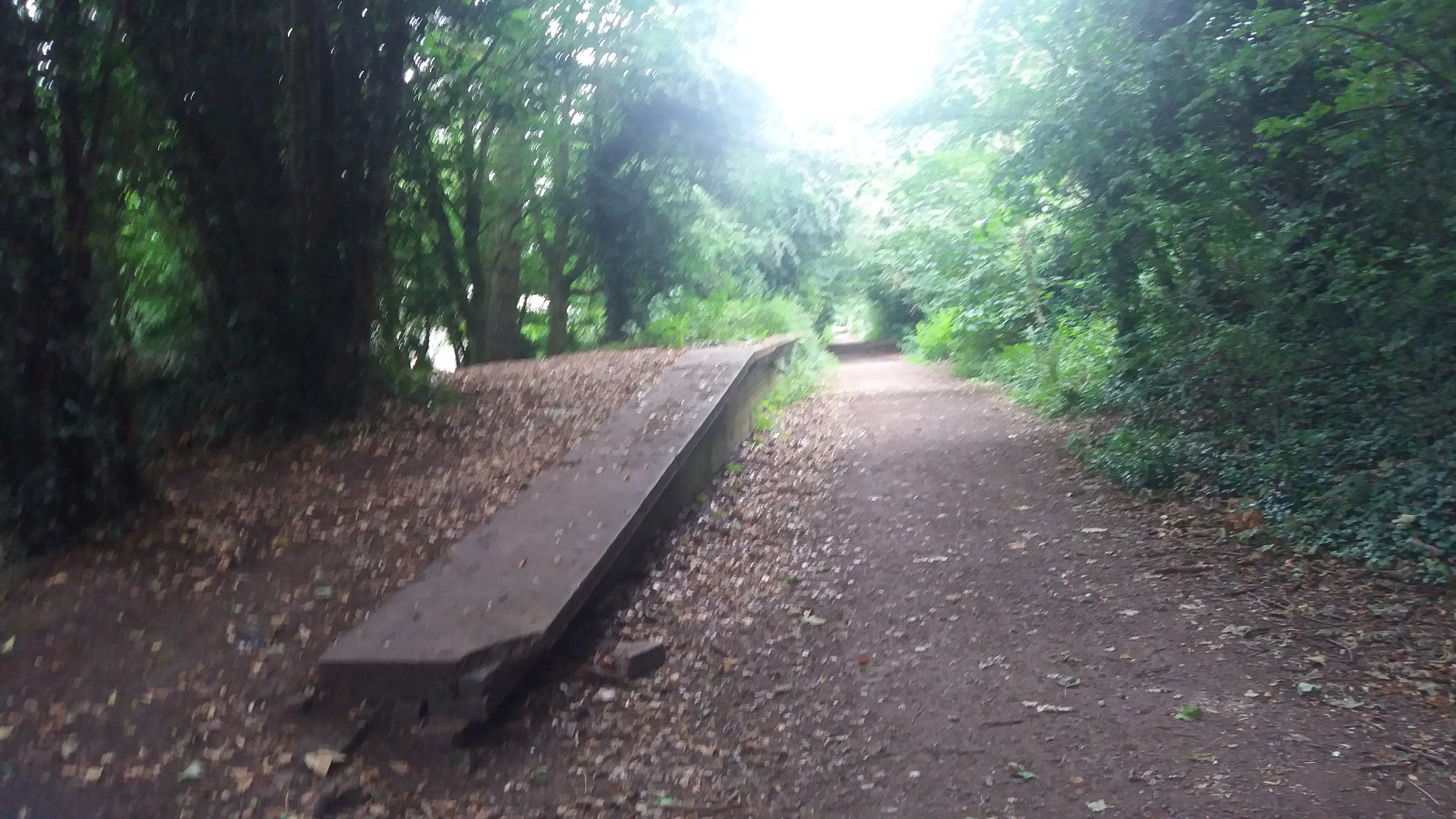
- Site of Compton Halt, only the platform remains

General information
- Location: Compton, Wolverhampton; England
- Coordinates: 52.5861°N 2.1739°W
- Grid reference: SO883987
- Platforms: 1

Other information
- Status: Disused

History
- Post-grouping: Great Western Railway

Key dates
- 1925: Station opened
- 1932: Station closed
Location

Compton Halt was a small single platform halt on the Wombourne Branch Line. It was opened by the Great Western Railway in 1925 and closed in 1932. Poor patronage was a factor in the closure of the line and Compton Halt's existence was similarly blighted.

Only the platform remains but is heavily overgrown and is partly decayed. The halt is now part of the South Staffordshire Railway Walk.

Preceding station	Disused railways	Following station
Tettenhall	Great Western Railway "The Wombourne Branch" (1925-1932)	Penn Halt
