= Gospel End =

Village in Staffordshire, England

Coordinates: 52°32′26″N 2°08′52″W

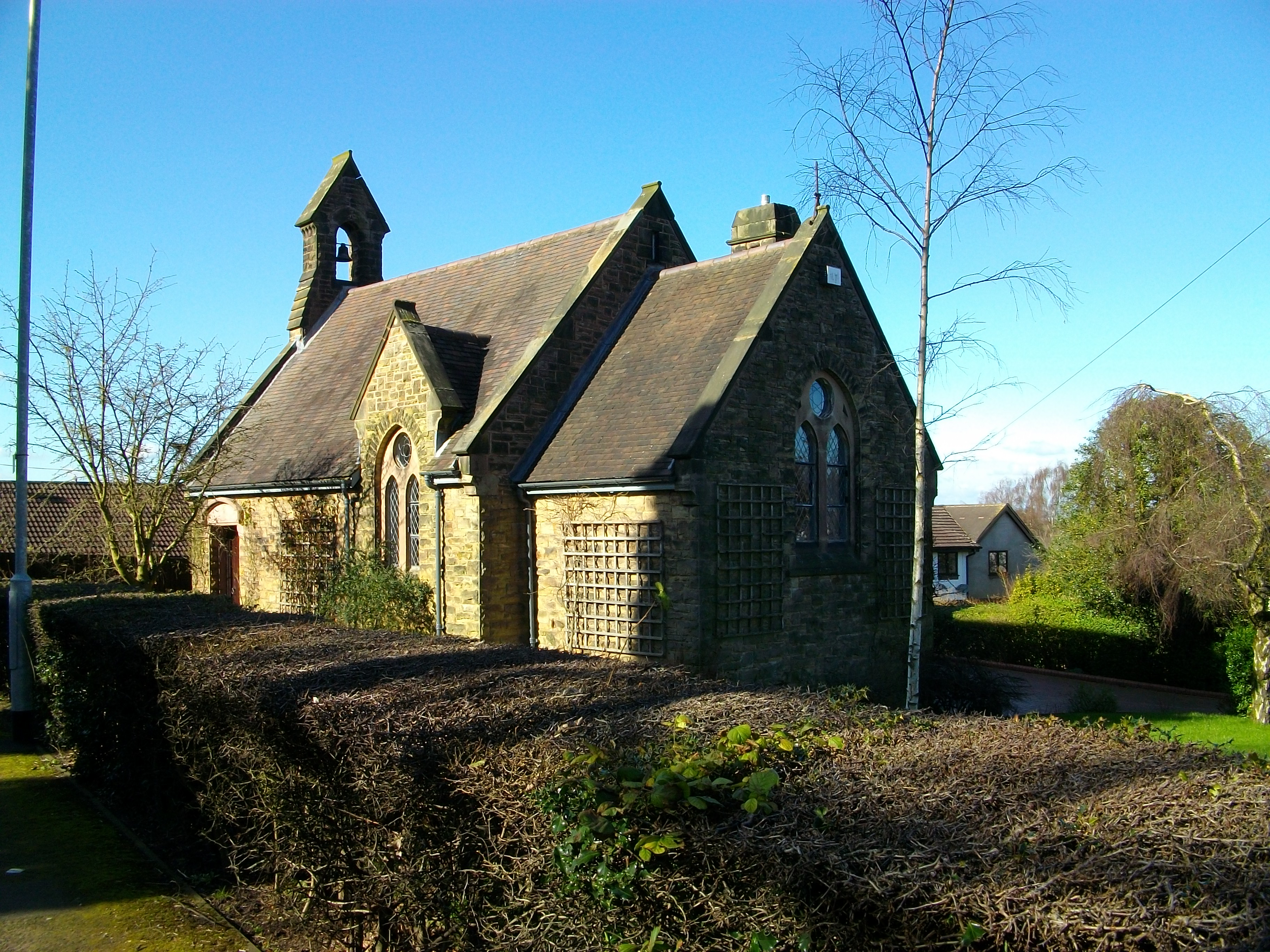
- Mission church of St Barnabas in Gospel End

- Location within Staffordshire
- OS grid reference: SO900936
- District: South Staffordshire
- Shire county: Staffordshire
- Region: West Midlands
- Country: England
- Sovereign state: United Kingdom
- Post town: Dudley
- Postcode district: DY3
- Dialling code: 01902
- Police: Staffordshire
- Fire: Staffordshire
- Ambulance: West Midlands
- UK Parliament: South Staffordshire

Gospel End is a village in the South Staffordshire district of Staffordshire, England. Population details taken at the 2011 census can be found under Himley. It is situated on the A463 road, between Sedgley and Wombourne.

== History ==
It was historically part of the ancient manor of Sedgley, becoming part of the Sedgley urban district in 1894, remaining part of this authority until it became part of the Seisdon Rural District in 1966, despite the bulk of Sedgley being absorbed into Dudley County Borough. This in turn was replaced by the South Staffordshire District in 1974. However, it still has a Sedgley DY3 postcode.

The main entrance to the Baggeridge Country Park, opened in the early 1980s on the site of the former Baggeridge Colliery, is situated to the west of the village. Also in the village was the original works (and former headquarters) of Baggeridge Brick, finally part of Wienerberger AG, which by 2012 had closed down as the factory's owners agreed a deal with David Wilson Homes to build a new housing estate on the site. The factory buildings were demolished but the iconic brick chimney was retained, being a local landmark and one of the last of its kind to remain locally. Construction of the new estate began in 2014 and the first houses were occupied by the spring of 2015, with the estate being almost complete by 2018. Commercial units and a care home have also been developed there.

The focal point of the village is the Summer House, a public house in the east of the village, which was built in the early 19th century. The building has since been expanded.

== Transport ==
Gospel End is now unconnected by public transport. It was until recently connected to Wombourne, Sedgley and surrounding villages by the 'South Staffordshire Link', a minibus running Thursday only and which required advance booking. It was available for those who either live too far from or are unable to use conventional bus routes.

The nearest regular bus route is on Diamond Bus service 27/27A at the end of The Northway, approximately 20 minutes walk away.

== Education ==
The community of Gospel End is not served by any schools, with school aged children living there mostly attending schools in neighbouring Wombourne, Sedgley or Wolverhampton.
