= Tettenhall railway station =

Former railway station in England

Tettenhall
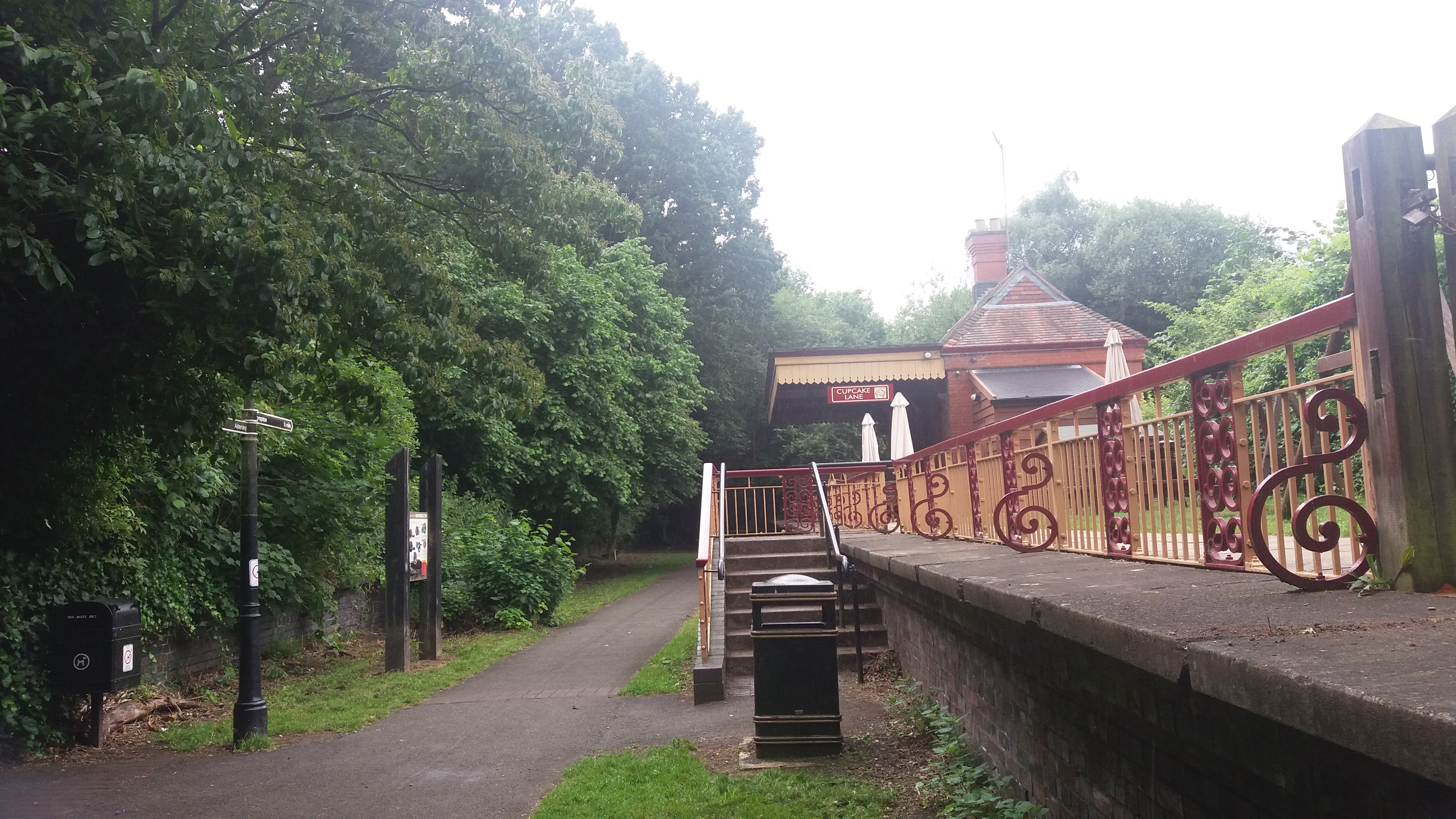
- Tettenhall station building, now part of the South Staffordshire Railway Walk.

General information
- Location: Tettenhall, Wolverhampton; England
- Coordinates: 52.5965°N 2.1621°W
- Grid reference: SO891999
- Platforms: 2

Other information
- Status: Disused

History
- Post-grouping: Great Western Railway

Key dates
- 11 January 1925: Opened
- 31 October 1932: Closed to passengers
Location

Tettenhall railway station was a station on the Wombourne Branch Line, serving the town of Tettenhall in Wolverhampton, Staffordshire. It was opened by the Great Western Railway in 1925 and closed in 1932. A significant number of station amenities were supplied but failed to improve patronage at the station, which ultimately led to its closure.

The station site is a rarity in that, despite the removal of the line 33 years after the station closed, it is almost totally complete.

Since 2014, the building has been home to a tea room named 'Cupcake Lane' having previously been a park ranger station. The goods depot behind the station now houses Tettenhall Heritage Centre.

The station is also the start and the northern end of the South Staffordshire Railway Walk which carries on down towards Wombourne railway station and onto Gornal Halt railway station.

Preceding station	Disused railways	Following station
Dunstall Park	Great Western Railway "The Wombourne Branch" (1925–1932)	Compton Halt
