= Baggeridge Colliery =

Colliery in Sedgley, West Midlands, England

Coordinates: 52.533°N 2.148°W

Baggeridge Colliery was a colliery located in Sedgley, West Midlands England.

== Colliery History ==
The Baggeridge Colliery was an enterprise of the Earls of Dudley, whose ancestors had profited from mineral extraction in the Black Country area of the West Midlands for several centuries. The site of Baggeridge Colliery, adjacent to Gospel End Village and more than a mile west of Sedgley village centre, was significant since it was just outside the geological boundary that delineated the South Staffordshire Coalfield. This boundary is known as the Western Boundary Fault of the South Staffordshire Coalfield. In an edition of the Engineer from 1869, a description of a visit by the Dudley and Midland Geological Society to the Earl of Dudley's No. 3 pit at the Himley Colliery is given. The visit took place 'to examine the peculiar formations of strata connected with the above fault.' The journal article speculated that coal might be found across the boundary at 'a much greater depth' than in the existing coalfield but also stated that 'it is the opinion of most geologists that there is every evidence of coal existing beyond the fault, and it will no doubt be found by the never-tiring energy of the Earl of Dudley's agents'

In 1896, a trial borehole was sunk by Vivian's Boring Co. Work on the colliery's first shaft started in February 1899 and a thick seam of coal was discovered in 1902. As predicted, the coal seams were to be found at a greater depth than those exploited over the centuries in the Black Country region of the West Midlands. A second shaft was sunk in 1910. By 1912 the two shafts were complete and production commenced.

The colliery was served by a branch of the Earl of Dudley's Pensnett Railway a network of mineral lines that linked many industrial sites in the west of the Black Country. The link was constructed by the GWR in 1907.

The pit, which closed on 2 March 1968 was the last remaining pit in the Black Country, marking the end of an era stretching some 300 years. Despite this, WMPTE continued to provide short additional workings on service 564 (Wolverhampton to Sedgley) for a number of years after the pit closure.

For the last two years of its existence, it was situated within the boundaries of Seisdon as part of a local government reorganisation. It also remained part of Staffordshire after 1974, when Sedgley became part of the new West Midlands county.

== Baggeridge Country Park ==
The former coalfields are now the site of Baggeridge Country Park, landscaped with a lake, wooded areas and walkways; work commenced in 1981 and the new country park was officially opened by The Princess Anne on 17 June 1983.
