= Dunstall Park railway station =

Former railway station in England

Dunstall Park
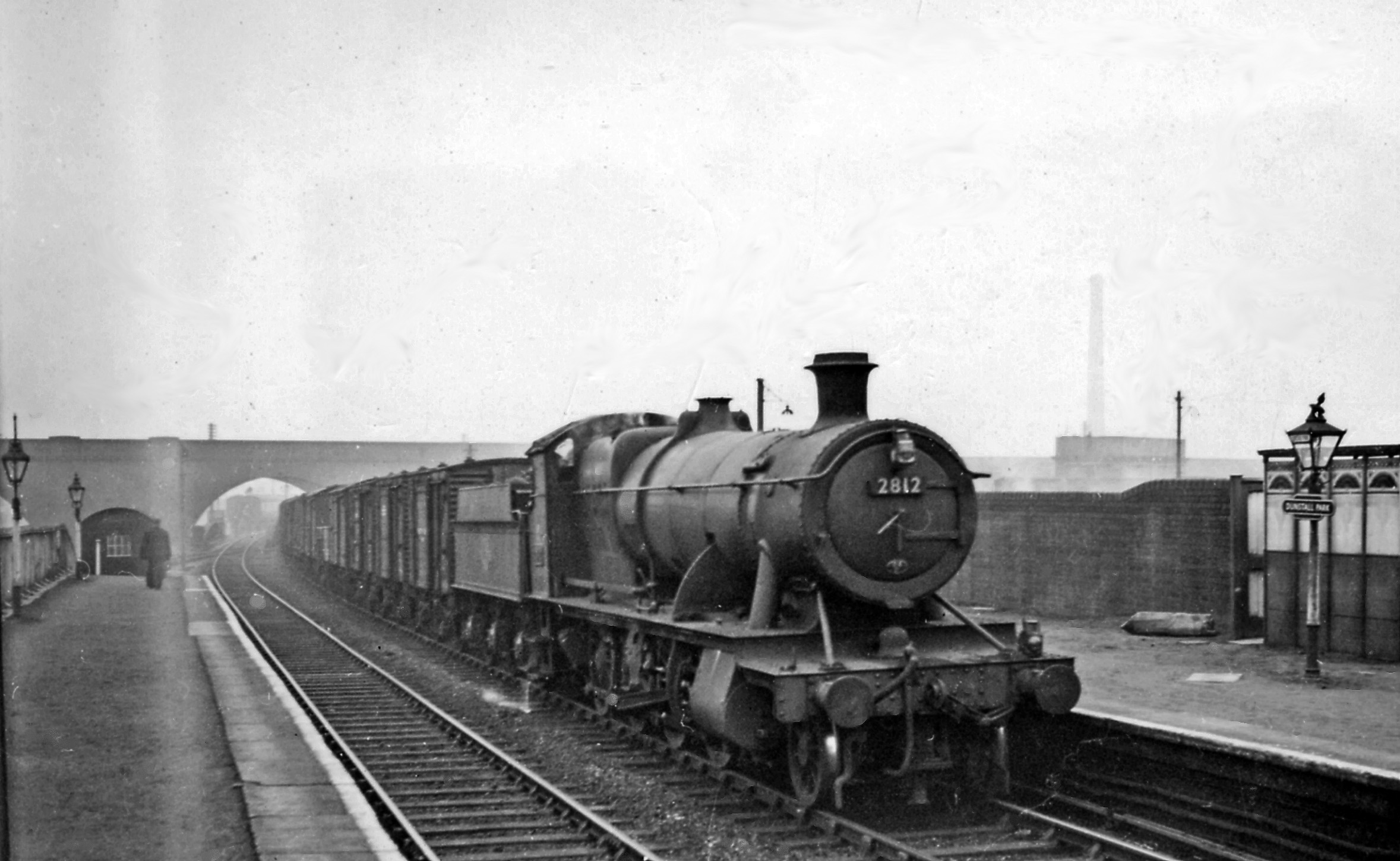
- Down freight passing Dunstall Park station in 1958

General information
- Location: Wolverhampton, Wolverhampton; England
- Coordinates: 52.5999°N 2.1282°W
- Grid reference: SJ914002
- Platforms: 2

Other information
- Status: Disused

History
- Original company: Great Western Railway
- Pre-grouping: Great Western Railway
- Post-grouping: Great Western Railway

Key dates
- 1 December 1896: Opened
- 1 January 1917: closed
- 3 March 1919: opened
- 4 March 1968: Closed
Location

Dunstall Park railway station was a station north of Wolverhampton Low Level railway station on the Great Western Railway's London Paddington to Birkenhead via Birmingham Snow Hill line. The station opened on 1 December 1896. Stafford Road engine shed and works and Oxley shed were nearby. It saw high traffic due to the nearby Wolverhampton Racecourse, but closed in 1968 when services between Wolverhampton and Shrewsbury were switched to Wolverhampton High Level.

It was the first stop north from the Low Level station, and was served by local trains towards Shrewsbury, as well as those on the Wombourne Branch Line to Stourbridge.

The station site has since been demolished although freight and passenger trains still pass through the site. There is a bricked up pedestrian entrance and ramp to the former station.

Immediately south of the station site is the short connecting line to the Stafford-Wolverhampton line. This freight-only line was mostly used by coal trains to Ironbridge Power Station in recent years.

Preceding station	Disused railways	Following station
Wolverhampton Low Level	Great Western Railway "The Wombourne Branch" (1925-1932)	Tettenhall
Wolverhampton Low Level	Great Western Railway; Wolverhampton-Shrewsbury (1854-1968)	Birches and Bilbrook

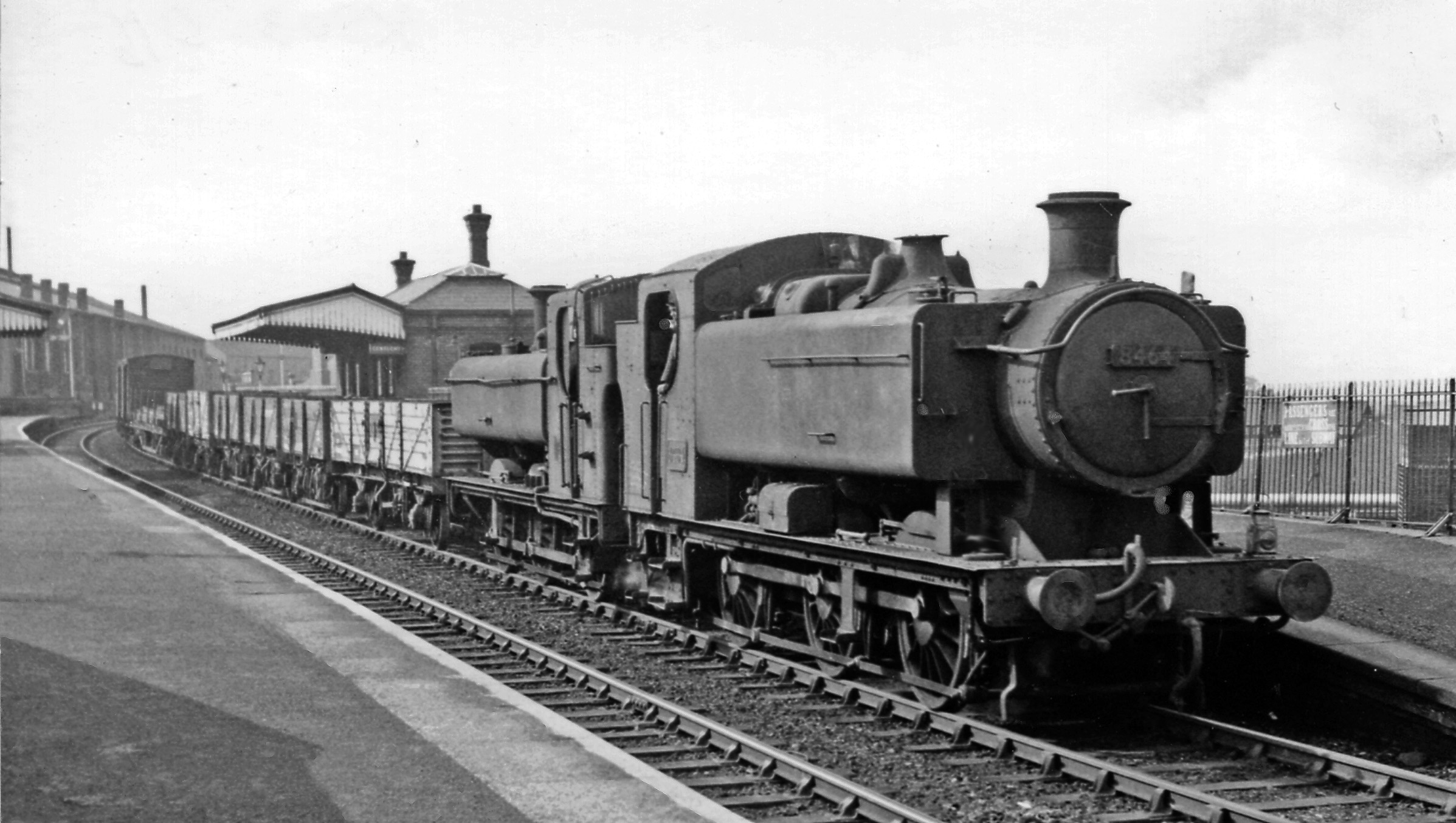
Up goods including a dead engine in 1962

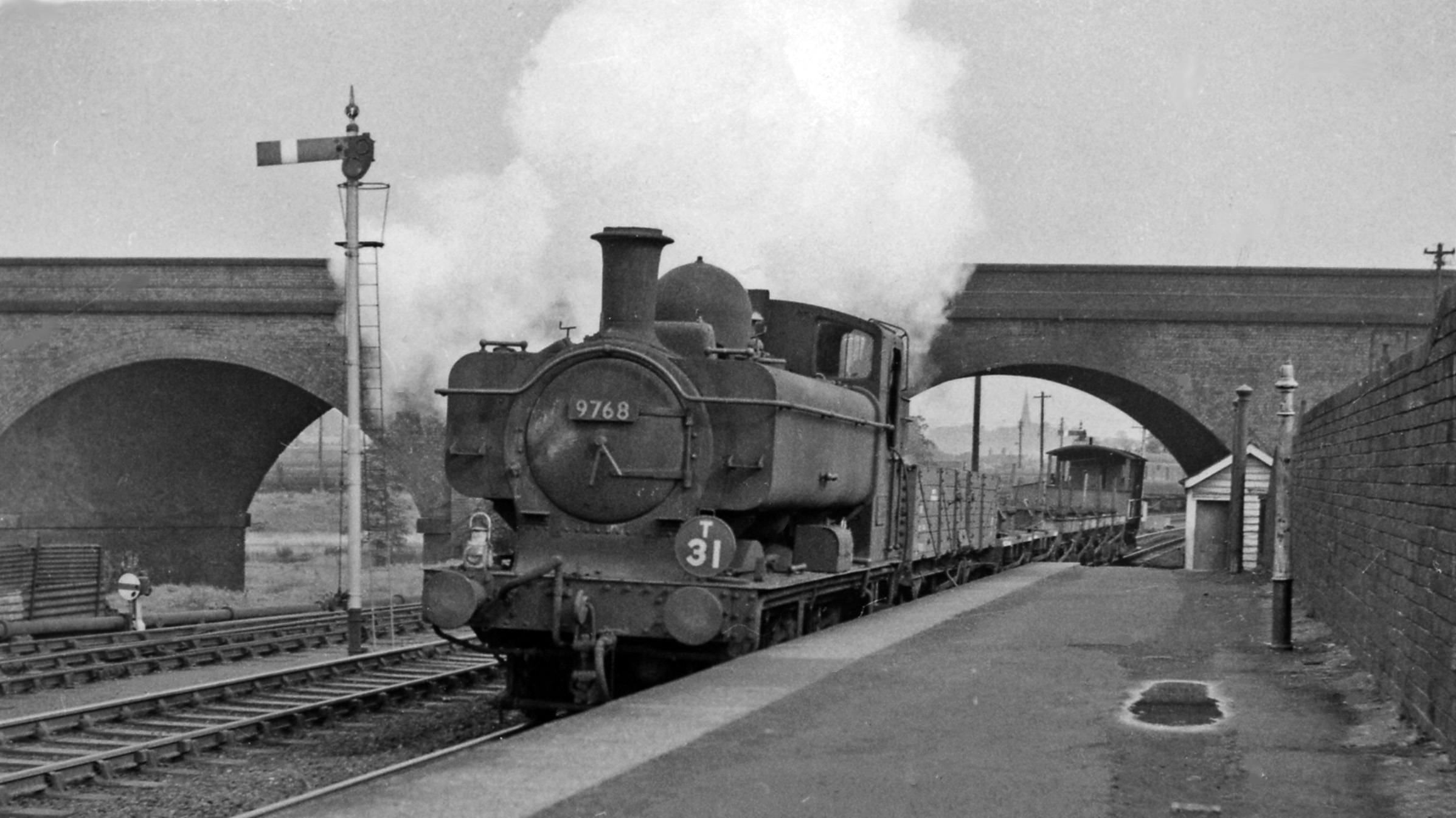
Down goods train passing under the LMR viaduct in 1962
