= Gornal Halt railway station =

Former railway station in England

Gornal Halt
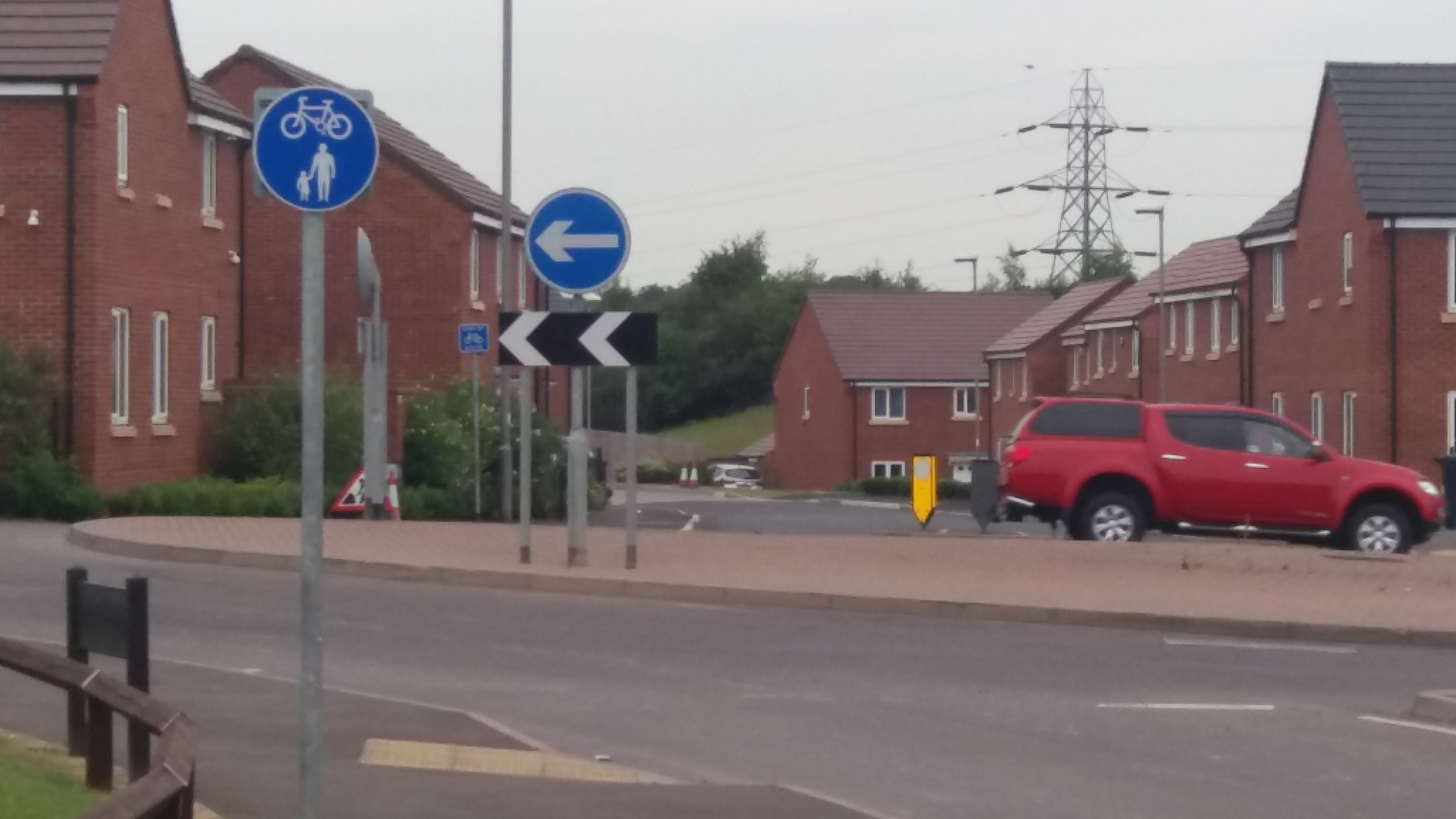
- The site of Gornal Halt, now under the newly built Himley View housing estate.

General information
- Location: Pensnett, Dudley; England
- Coordinates: 52.5092°N 2.1422°W
- Grid reference: SO904901
- Platforms: 2

Other information
- Status: Disused

History
- Post-grouping: Great Western Railway

Key dates
- 1925: Opened
- 1932: Closed
Location

Gornal Halt was a small railway stop on the Wombourne Branch Line. It was opened by the Great Western Railway in 1925 and closed in 1932. The halt served the nearby village of Gornal Wood. The railway passing through the site remained open until 1968.

The South Staffordshire Railway Walk ends around the Gornal Halt area and the site of Gornal Halt towards Pensnett Halt railway station has become "Himley View", which is a mix of a housing estate and industrial estates.

Preceding station	Disused railways	Following station
Himley	Great Western Railway "The Wombourne Branch" (1925-1932)	Pensnett Halt
