= Brockmoor Halt railway station =

Disused railway station in England

Brockmoor Halt
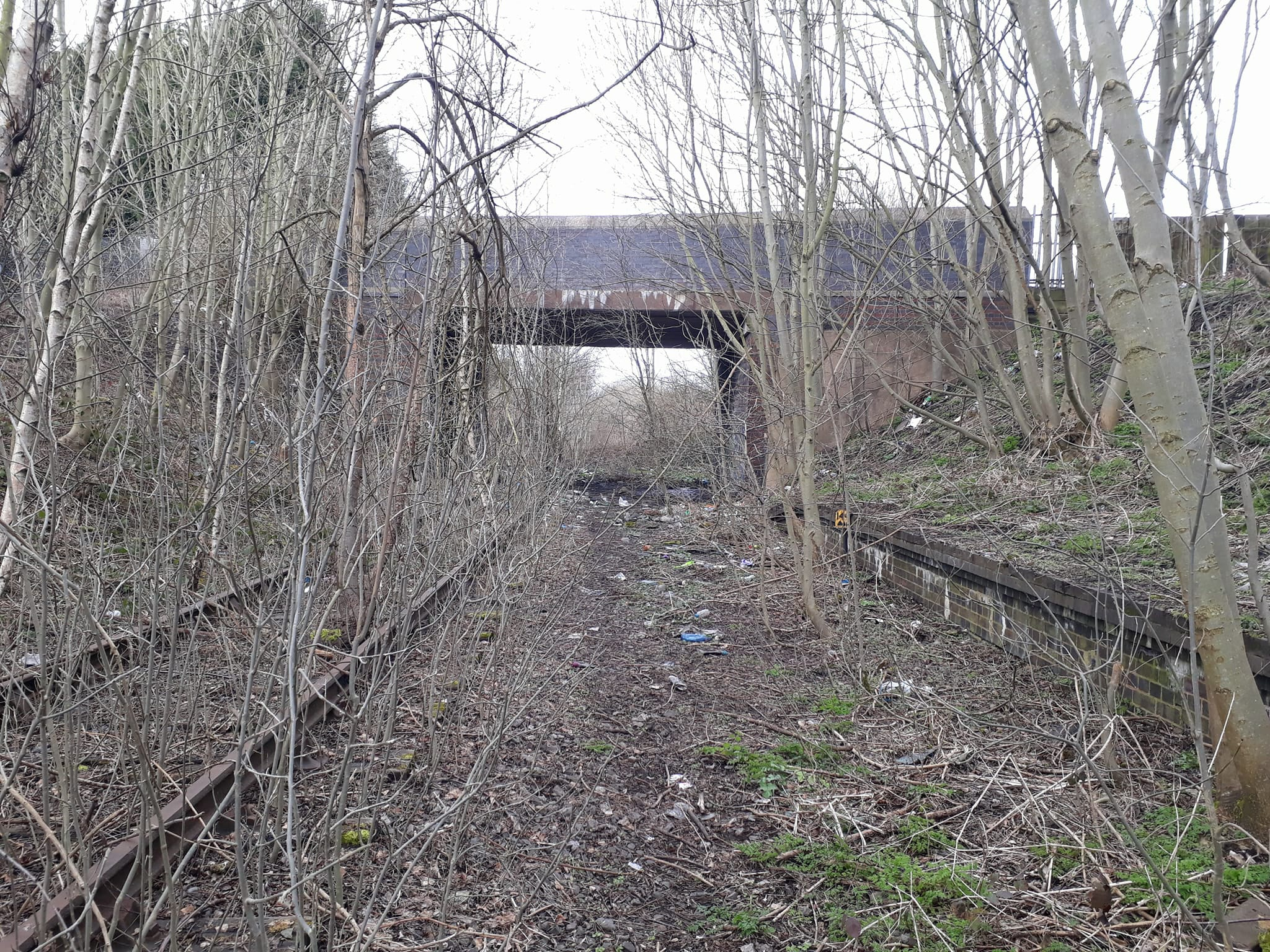
- The site of the former Brockmoor Halt.

General information
- Location: Brierley Hill; Dudley; England
- Coordinates: 52.4816°N 2.1335°W
- Grid reference: SO910870
- Platforms: 2

Other information
- Status: Disused

History
- Post-grouping: Great Western Railway

Key dates
- 11 May 1925: Opened
- 31 October 1932: Closed
Location

Brockmoor Halt was a small railway stop on the Wombourne Branch Line in West Midlands, England. It had very poor patronage and, along with the rest of the line's passenger stations, was closed just seven years after its introduction by the Great Western Railway in 1925. The halt served the settlement of Brockmoor, which is now part of the Brierley Hill area.

Brierley Hill railway station was closer to Brockmoor's small High Street than the halt named after it. Brockmoor Halt remains in place with the platforms and single rail including the bridge to Kingswinford Junction but it has been fenced off and mothballed since 1994.

Preceding station	Disused railways	Following station
Bromley Halt	Great Western Railway "The Wombourne Branch" (1925-1932)	Brettell Lane
