= Himley =

Village and civil parish in Staffordshire, England

Coordinates: 52.51791°N 2.18415°W

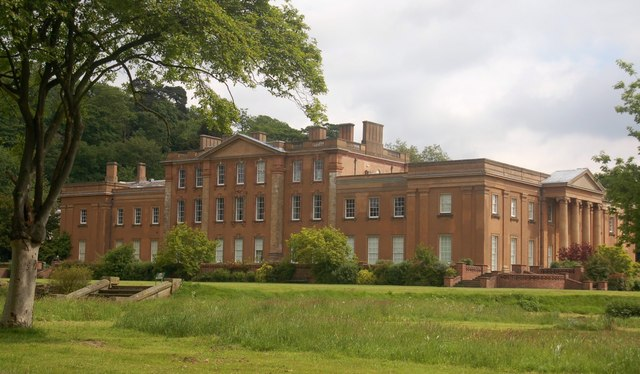
- Himley Hall

- Location within Staffordshire
- Area: 4.9 km^{2} (1.9 sq mi)
- Population: 802 (2011 census)
  - Density: 164/km^{2} (420/sq mi)
- OS grid reference: SO876911
- District: South Staffordshire
- Shire county: Staffordshire
- Region: West Midlands
- Country: England
- Sovereign state: United Kingdom
- Post town: Dudley
- Postcode district: DY3
- Police: Staffordshire
- Fire: Staffordshire
- Ambulance: West Midlands
- UK Parliament: South Staffordshire

Himley is a small village and civil parish in Staffordshire, England, 4 miles (6.4 km) west of Dudley and 5 miles (8.0 km) southwest of Wolverhampton. At the 2011 Census, it had a population of 802. Himley Hall was the home of the Lords of Dudley.

== History ==
Himley parish became part of Seisdon Union following the Poor Law Amendment Act 1834, and later the Seisdon Rural District until 1974, when it became part of the newly formed South Staffordshire district. Despite these administrative boundaries, Himley Hall is owned by Dudley Metropolitan Borough Council. Located next to Himley Hall is St. Michael's Church, the only church in the village, which was erected in 1764 and is a Grade II listed building. Most recent Earls of Dudley are interred in a private burial ground at the rear of Himley's parish church.

== Transport ==
Himley is situated off the intersection of the main A449 road between Wolverhampton and Kidderminster, and the B4176 road between Dudley and Telford, which includes the village's bypass opened in July 1988. Bus route National Express West Midlands 15 from Wombourne to Merry Hill Shopping Centre serves Himley village. Service 15 runs up to every 30 minutes during Monday to Saturday daytimes. There are no late night and Sunday journeys through Himley. In addition Diamond Bus operate bus service 242S to Kinver High School on school days.

Between 1925 and 1932, there was a railway station known as Himley railway station on the Wombourne Branch Line, which opened as a goods line in 1911 but was only open for just over half a century. It was operated by the Great Western Railway. A picnic area now stands on the site of the station, forming part of the 10-mile (16 km) Kingswinford Railway Walk.

== Places of interest ==
Regular events take place at Himley Hall such as wedding functions and exhibitions, as well as local council-organised firework displays. Himley Golf Club, located within the grounds of Himley Hall, is open to the public.

The Old Rectory, built c. 1760, is almost as big as St. Michael's Church behind it. The building, which had been sold by the Church of England in the 1950s, is now a private residence and is briefly mentioned in Nikolaus Pevsner's Buildings of Staffordshire. It was Grade II listed in 1963. When the building was still a working rectory, its garden was once visited by Mary of Teck, Queen consort as the wife of George V. The rectory for the parish is now in Swindon.

There are two parks in Himley: the main park located within the boundaries of Himley Hall; and a second smaller park located on School Road.

The 18th-century Crooked House pub, just within the boundaries of Himley parish, was gutted by fire in August 2023, and then promptly demolished without council permission. In February 2024 South Staffordshire Council issued the landowner with an enforcement notice which requires them to reconstruct the building.

The grounds of Himley Cricket Club have held one Twenty20 match for Worcestershire.

== Gallery ==
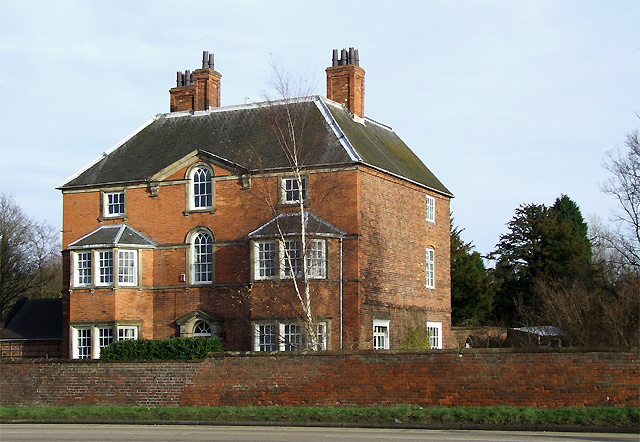
The Old Rectory

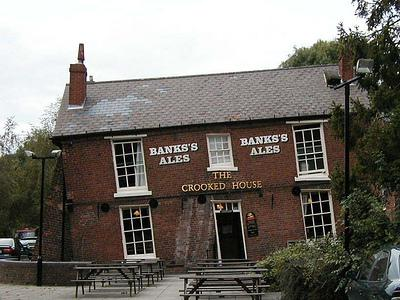
The Crooked House pub (controversially demolished in 2023)

== See also ==
- Listed buildings in Himley
