= St Regis Church of England Academy =

Location
- Regis Road; Tettenhall; Wolverhampton, West Midlands, WV6 8XG; England; 52.5980°N 2.1842°W

Information
- Former name: The Regis School; The Kings Church of England School
- Type: Academy
- Religious affiliation: Church of England
- Established: 1955; 71 years ago (as The Regis School)
- Local authority: Wolverhampton City Council
- Trust: Three Spires Trust
- Department for Education URN: 147113 Tables
- Ofsted: Reports
- Principal: Chris Green
- Gender: Coeducational
- Age: 11 to 18
- Enrolment: 646 as of March 2023
- Website: stregisacademy.org

St Regis Church of England Academy is a coeducational Church of England secondary school and sixth form located at Tettenhall, 2.5 miles (4.0 km) north-west of Wolverhampton City Centre, in the West Midlands county of England. It was originally formed as The Regis School in 1955 until 1998 when it changed its name to The King's Church of England School. After becoming part of the Three Spires Trust, the decision was taken to change the name to St Regis Church of England Academy to coincide with the start of the 2023/24 school year. It was extensively rebuilt/refurbished in 2012 and can now accommodate up to 900 pupils.

Previously a voluntary aided school administered by Wolverhampton City Council, in April 2023 The King's Church of England School converted to academy status. The school is now sponsored by the Three Spires Trust, but continues to be under the jurisdiction of the Diocese of Lichfield.

The school's facilities include: dance studio, drama studios, theatre, lecture theatre, fitness suite, sports hall, swimming pool, MUGA/tennis courts, cinder running track, faith centre and playing fields.

== Three Spires Sixth Form ==
After becoming part of the Three Spires Trust in September 2023 St Peters and St Regis Collegiate sixth form was born, this was then later re-launched as Three Spires Sixth Form on Thursday 20 June 2024.

== Notable former pupils ==
- Denise Lewis (born 27 August 1972, in West Bromwich, England), a retired British heptathlete
- Vikram Singh Solanki (born 1 April 1976), an Indian-born English cricket player
