= Baggeridge Country Park =

Country park in Staffordshire, England

Coordinates: 52.5336°N 2.1518°W

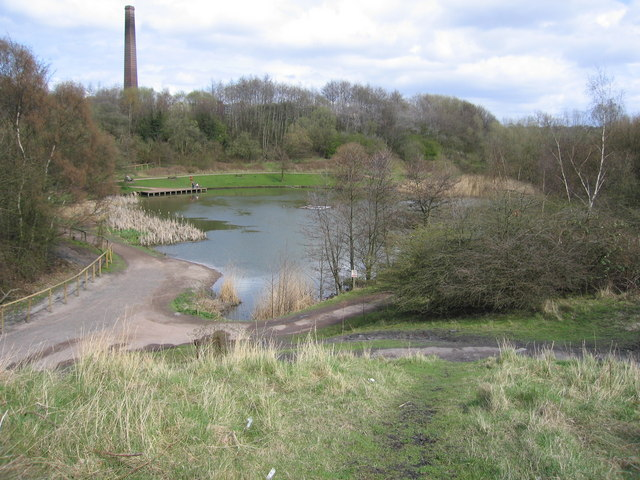
Baggeridge County Park
The Bag Pool at Baggeridge Country Park
Location
| Nearest Village: | Gospel End |
| County: | Staffordshire |
| Country: | England, U.K. |
Information
| Area: | 150 acres (0.61 km^{2}) |
| Status: | Country park, local nature reserve |
| Established: | 1970 to 1981 |
| Awards: | Green Flag Award |
Administration
| Administrative authority: | South Staffordshire District Council |

Baggeridge Country Park is located within the South Staffordshire district of Staffordshire, England. Its entrance is on the A463 just west of Gospel End, a small Staffordshire village just beyond the borders of the Wolverhampton, Gornal and the surrounding Metropolitan Borough of Dudley.

== Main information ==
Baggeridge Country Park is owned by the South Staffordshire Council. The main feature is a large hill of Pit Mounds which has plenty of paths to its summit and a lake named Bag Pool located between the parking grounds and the hill.

The nearest bus service is Diamond Bus service 27/27A which operates daily from Wolverhampton to Dudley via Sedgley and Gornal. Passengers should alight at the stop in Northway at the junction of Gospel End Road from where Baggeridge is approximately a 20 minute walk. Unfortunately the last direct bus to the village of Gospel End was withdrawn in 2017.

The facilities located near parking space are

- A bandstand, café, camping field, events field, large children's play area, miniature railway and sensory garden.
- A ropes course named Closer to the Edge is also in the park.

It is a local nature reserve.

== History ==
Baggeridge was originally owned by the Earls of Dudley as part of the Himley Estate and consisted of small farms and ancient woodland along with the parkland of Himley Park. It was later landscaped by Lancelot "Capability" Brown in the 18th century; the landscape is still largely unchanged from the southern boundary up to the Wishing Pools. The whole site remained as landscaped by Brown until 1902 when work began to mine the northern half when pit shafts were sunk and a cast mining operation began. The mine was then nationalized in 1947 and closed down on 1 March 1968 - by which time it was the last deep coal mine in the local area. In 1970 the western, central, southern and eastern areas were designated a Country Park with full reclamation being completed on 12 January 1981. The north eastern area became Baggeridge Brick, which was demolished in 2012 and redeveloped with housing as well as small commercial units and a care home. It was officially opened on 17 June 1983 by Princess Anne.

== Landscape ==
The northern part of the park consists of grassland, woodland and wetland. A marsh with a small path next to it is located near Newt Meadow, wetlands and heathland at Gospel End Common. The south of the park consists of woodland and parkland which was landscaped by Capability Brown.

The terrain is mainly hilly, but level with some flat areas, and some rough terrain in areas.

== Walks ==
There are many walks around Baggeridge; the official routes are as follows:

The Easy Access: The Easy Access walk is a circular walk with a mainly level gradient which takes 30 minutes. It is designed for the disabled.

Toposcope Trail: The Toposcope Trail walk goes past Bag Pool and up to the summit of the hill where views of the park and surrounding area as far as the Welsh Mountains can be found. The total route talks about 45 minutes and has many step gradients.

Baggeridge Circular Walk: The Baggeridge Circular Walk has fair step gradients and goes past Bag Pool to the base of the hill and then down to the edge of Whites Wood before looping around past multiple lakes and back up to the car park.

Baggeridge Woodland Walk: The Baggeridge Woodland Walk starts off following the same route as the Circular Walk until it goes along public footpaths through the private part of Baggeridge Wood outside the country park. It comes out at Gospel End Common and then finally ends at the upper meadow near the top of the car parks. The total route takes approximately 1 hour 30 minutes and has fair step gradients.

Besides these official routes there are many paths which fork from the main routes, such as. There are paths around Bag Pool for a circular walk around the lake that turn and join onto another path where it is possible to go either up the hill or into Newt Meadow. From Newt Meadow and many other paths it is possible follow a route up initially steep steps into a woodland with views over the nearby countryside and towns, before joining the Circular Walk where turning right leads back to Bag Pool.

Another walk takes visitors to the nearby Himley Park; the Himley path goes past two lakes and a waterfall following the stream from the main lake. It also provides access to Whites Wood and has several paths running alongside it.
