= Listed buildings in Himley =

Himley is a civil parish in the district of South Staffordshire, Staffordshire, England. It contains twelve listed buildings that are recorded in the National Heritage List for England. Of these, one is at Grade II*, the middle of the three grades, and the others are at Grade II, the lowest grade. The most important building in the parish is Himley Hall, a country house, which is listed together with associated structures and items in the grounds, Himley Park. The other listed buildings include a former rectory and associated structures, houses, a church, a hotel, a public house, and an ice house.

== Key ==
Grade	Criteria
II*	Particularly important buildings of more than special interest
II	Buildings of national importance and special interest

== Buildings ==
Name and location	Photograph	Date	Notes	Grade
The Old Rectory; 52.51764°N 2.17433°W		c. 1700	The rectory, later a private house, was remodelled in about 1767. It is in brown and red brick on a stone plinth, with stone dressings, a moulded eaves cornice, and a hipped tile roof. There are three storeys and three bays, the middle bay pedimented. The central doorway has pilasters, a fanlight, and a pediment, and in the outer bays are two-storey canted bay windows containing sashes. The windows above the doorway have round heads and contain Gothic glazing. Elsewhere there are casement windows with segmental heads, and at the rear is a tall stair window.	II
Himley Hall; 52.52189°N 2.16618°W		Early 18th century	A country house that was extended in 1824–27 by William Atkinson by the addition of flanking wings, forming three sides of a courtyard. The house is built in stone and has hipped slate roofs. The earlier part is the west or garden front. This has a central block of three storeys and seven bays, the middle three bays projecting under a pediment. The block has giant corner pilasters and a balustraded parapet, and contains sash windows with raised architraves, keystones, bracketed sill and aprons. The block is flanked by two-storey three-bay bay links, and single-bay bay ends, the last with paired Doric pilasters, eaves cornices, and plain parapets. The south front has two storeys and nine bays, giant Doric pilasters, and in the centre is a three-bay Ionic portico with unfluted columns.	II*
Himley House Hotel; 52.51880°N 2.17480°W		Early 18th century	A house, later a hotel, it was remodelled and extended in the 19th century and later. It is roughcast with a hipped slate roof. The main block has three storeys and five bays, there is a single-storey extension to the left, and a recessed 20th-century extension to the right. In the centre of the main block is a porch with columns and a flat roof. Most of the windows are sashes, to the left of the porch is a window with a round head and a keystone, in the left extension are two round-headed windows and a French window, and the right extension contains bow windows.	II
Ice house at N.G.R. SO 88099142; 52.52069°N 2.17680°W	—	18th century	The ice house has a brick dome, and the floor is in brick and earth. It has a segmental arched entrance with a boarded door.	II
St Michael's Church; 52.51774°N 2.17388°W		1764	The exterior of the church is rendered, and the roofs are tiled. The church consists of a nave, an apsidal chancel, a southeast vestry, and a west tower. The tower has four stages, a west door, a datestone, and a plain parapet. The windows in the church are round-headed with imposts and keystones.	II
The Dudley Arms; 52.51955°N 2.17582°W		Late 18th century	A house, later a public house, it is in painted brick with a rendered front, a dentilled eaves band, and a tile roof. There are three storeys, and a T-shaped plan, with a main block of three bays, a rear wing, and further rear extensions. The doorway to the left of centre has fluted columns, a fanlight, and an open pediment. The windows are tripartite sashes divided by colonettes.	II
Former coach house and stable block, The Old Rectory; 52.51787°N 2.17406°W	—	Late 18th century	The buildings are in red brick with slate roofs, and are arranged round three sides of a courtyard, with the fourth side completed by a wall with a central carriage entrance flanked by square gate piers. The buildings have one storey, some with lofts, and contain segmental arches, cast iron casement windows with Gothic glazing, and doorways.	II
The Seven Dwellings, Bridgnorth Road; 52.51825°N 2.18323°W	—	Late 18th century	A terrace of four houses in red brick, with a dentilled eaves band and a tile roof. There are two storeys and seven bays, the middle bay projecting under a pediment containing a blind lunette. The windows are casements with segmental heads, there are four lean-to porches, and a 20th-century single-bay extension on the left.	II
Bridge, Himley Park; 52.52532°N 2.16177°W	—	Early 19th century	The bridge between Rock Pool and Island Pool in the grounds of Himley Hall carries a road. It is in rusticated stone, and consists of a single semicircular arch. The bridge has grooved voussoirs, a large keystone incorporated into the parapet band, and a plain parapet. The abutments are flanked by square piers.	II
Frant Lodge, walls, railings and gates 52.51820°N 2.17112°W		Early 19th century	The lodge at the entrance to the drive to Himley Hall is in stone, and has one storey and three bays. The middle bay is recessed and contains a doorway between Ionic columns, and the outer bays have pediments and contain sash windows with moulded and coved architraves. To the right a coved wall connects with the gateway, which has three ornamental gates and railings, and at the ends are square piers with oversailing caps.	II
Ice house, Himley Park; 52.52441°N 2.16525°W	—	Early 19th century	The ice house is in the grounds of Himley Hall to the north of the hall. It is in sandstone, with a circular plan, and is covered in earth. There is a short vaulted access passage leading to a doorway and to a circular ice chamber. This is cut unto bedrock and has a shallow domed roof containing an ice chute.	II
Lodges, gates, piers and railings 52.51948°N 2.16312°W		Early 19th century	At the entrance to the drive to Himley Hall are two similar lodges, in stone with slate roofs. Each lodge has one storey, three bays, corner pilasters, a central Ionic portico with a pediment, and a doorway with a moulded architrave and a rectangular fanlight. In the outer bays are sash windows with moulded architraves. Between the lodges are two square gate piers with oversailing caps and trefoil-headed panels, and ornamental cast iron gates. To the outside of the lodges are ornamental railings and end piers, and behind the lodges are three-bay Ionic colonnades.	II
Wall and railings between the Old Rectory and Frant Lodge; 52.51764°N 2.17279°W	—	Early 19th century	The stone wall with ornamental cast iron railings stretches along the north side of the B4176 road, and forms the southern boundary of the churchyard of St Michael's Church.	II
