= Bromley Halt railway station =

Disused railway station in England

Bromley Halt
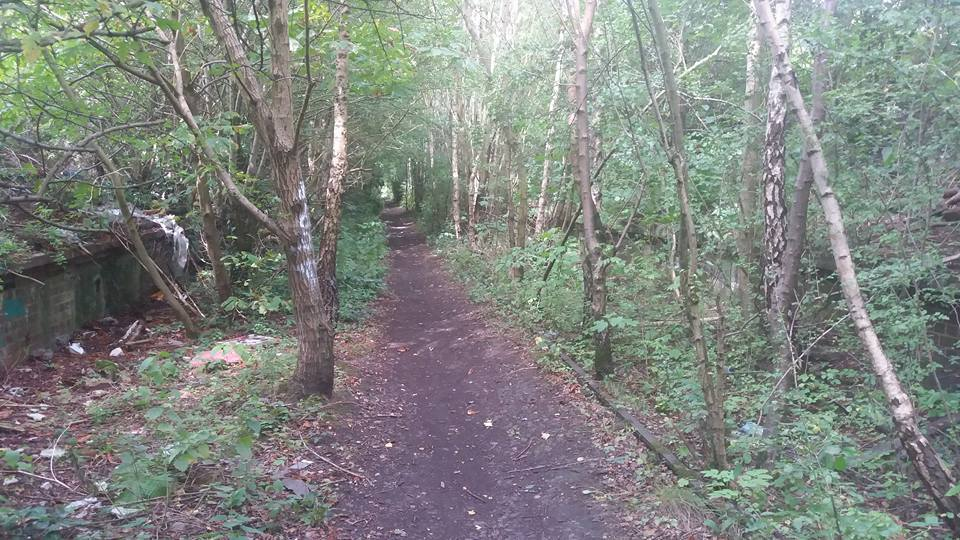
- The former site of Bromley Halt.

General information
- Location: Bromley, Dudley; England
- Coordinates: 52.4904°N 2.1403°W
- Grid reference: SO905880
- Platforms: 2

Other information
- Status: Disused

History
- Post-grouping: Great Western Railway

Key dates
- 11 May 1925: Opened
- 31 October 1932: Closed
Location

Bromley Halt was a small railway stop on the Wombourne Branch Line. It had very poor patronage and, along with the rest of the line's passenger stations, was closed just seven years after its introduction by the Great Western Railway in 1925. The halt served the communities between Pensnett, Wordsley and Kingswinford. A portion of the line remained open until 1994 between the Pensnett Trading Estate and Kingswinford Junction. The line from Bromley Haly to Kingswinford Junction has since been mothballed.

Bromley Halt ran alongside the Stourbridge Extension Canal, which itself was eventually removed. Only two platforms and a single line from Bromley Halt to Pensnett Halt and Kingswinford Junction remain.

Preceding station	Disused railways	Following station
Pensnett Halt	Great Western Railway "The Wombourne Branch" (1925-1932)	Brockmoor Halt
