= Wombourn railway station =

Former railway station in England

Wombourne
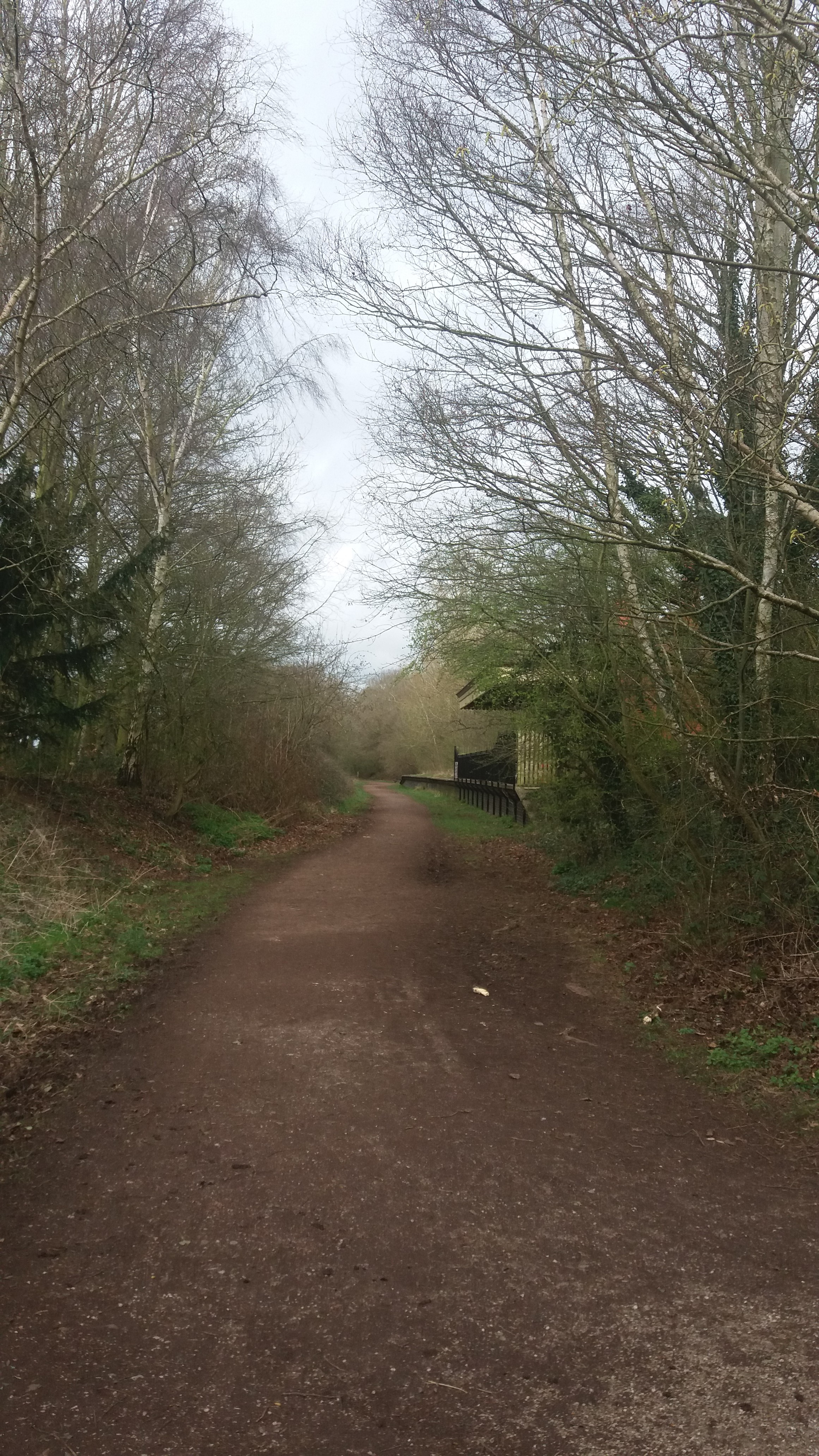
- The station building and platform at Wombourn, now a cafe and part of the South Staffordshire Railway Walk.

General information
- Location: Wombourne, South Staffordshire, Staffordshire; England
- Coordinates: 52.5432°N 2.1927°W
- Grid reference: SO869939
- Platforms: 2

Other information
- Status: Disused

History
- Original company: Great Western Railway
- Post-grouping: Great Western Railway

Key dates
- 1925: Opened
- 1932: Closed
Location

Wombourn railway station was the main intermediate station on the Wombourne Branch Line, situated at the Bratch. It was opened by the Great Western Railway in 1925 and closed in 1932. Despite its grand design, which included a goods yard and extensive passenger facilities, poor patronage led to the station’s closure only seven years after opening. The station remained in use for freight traffic until the line through the station closed on 24 June 1965.

The station building survives and now operates as a tearoom and information centre, popular with walkers. It is one of only two station buildings still standing in situ on the South Staffordshire Railway Walk.

The station was named Wombourn, the standard spelling at the time, rather than Wombourne. This naming reflected a decision by the Great Western Railway to avoid confusion with the similarly named Wimborne.

Preceding station	Disused railways	Following station
Penn Halt	Great Western Railway "The Wombourne Branch" (1925-1932)	Himley
