= Himley Hall =

Himley Hall and Park
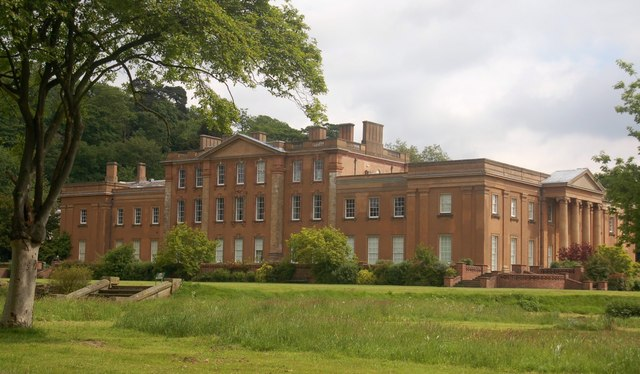

- Location within Staffordshire

General information
- Status: Open to public
- Type: English country house
- Architectural style: Georgian
- Location: Himley, Staffordshire
- Coordinates: 52.5219°N 2.1662°W
- Completed: 18th century
- Renovated: 1824-27
- Owner: Dudley Metropolitan Borough Council

Renovating team
- Architect: William Atkinson

Listed Building – Grade II*
- Designated: 16 June 1953
- Reference no.: 1230781

Himley Hall is an early 17th-century country house situated in Staffordshire, England. It is situated in the south of the county in the small village of Himley, near to the town of Dudley and the city of Wolverhampton. Himley Hall is a Grade II* listed building. Its park and garden, which were extended in the 1770s by Lancelot "Capability" Brown, are Grade II listed with the National Register of Historic Parks and Gardens.

== History ==
In early days, it was a moated manor house, standing beside the medieval church. For over four centuries it served as a secondary home to the Lords of Dudley and their knights. Its occupants included Dud Dudley, whose 17th-century experiments in smelting iron ore with coal were carried out nearby. In 1645, King Charles I encamped in the grounds on his way to defeat at the Battle of Naseby during the English Civil War.

In 1628, the Ward family inherited the title Lords of Dudley through the marriage of Humble Ward to the heiress to the Dudley estates, Frances Sutton. Humble Ward was the son of the jeweller and goldsmith to the court of King Charles I. Following damage to Dudley Castle during the Civil War, Himley Hall became the principal family home.

The current hall dates from the 18th century when John Ward demolished the medieval manor to make way for a great Palladian mansion. The village of Himley was relocated at this time, and its parish church rebuilt on its present site in 1764. Most recent Earls of Dudley are interred in a private burial ground at the rear of this church.

In 1774 John Ward died and was succeeded by his son John Ward, Junior, who commissioned Capability Brown to redesign the 180 acres (730,000 m^{2}) of parkland. Changes in Brown's 1779 plans included the addition of a lake, fed by a series of waterfalls from a higher chain of smaller pools.

The family left Himley in the 1830s, because it was too close to the Black Country. They instead lived in great grandeur on their mineral wealth at Witley Court at Great Witley in Worcestershire.

In 1934, the Duke and Duchess of Kent honeymooned at Himley Hall. King Edward VIII spent his last weekend there before his abdication in 1936.

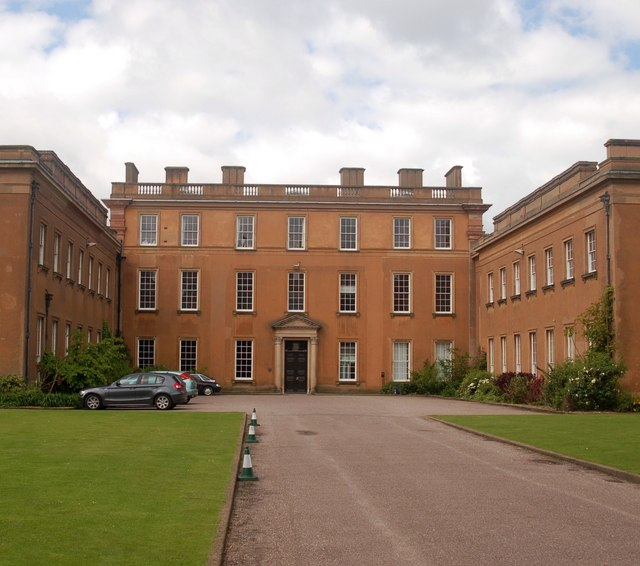
The main entrance to Himley Hall

After the Second World War, the property was sold to the National Coal Board for £45,000 in January 1947, only two hours before it was set to go on the auction block. The board planned to use it as office space for 250 of its West Midlands staff. Three months later, during its conversion for this new purpose, a fire broke out and gutted the South wing. The house was unoccupied when fire broke out, and all of Lord Dudley's art and furnishings had been removed three days prior. This part of the house was rebuilt, but not according to its former appearance. The decline in the coal mining industry in the area led to the Hall being once more put on the market.

In 1966, it was purchased jointly by Dudley and Wolverhampton County Borough Councils − despite existing within the Seisdon Urban District (and then South Staffordshire from 1974). The park was opened as a public leisure area. In 1988, Dudley bought Wolverhampton's share, gaining outright ownership.

== Himley Park ==
Set in the grounds of Himley Hall, Himley Park was created in the 1970s and is now visited by over 200,000 visitors each year. It features a large lake and hill with many woodland walks along with open parkland. It is well known for its thriving population of ducks. There is a small log cabin café which is open for hot food and drinks.

There is also a nine-hole public golf course which was designed by A & K Baker in 1980 and a family pitch and putt within the park, along with public fishing on the lake. Himley Hall sailing club have sailed on the Great Lake since 1970 and are a RYA-registered training centre.

== See also ==
- Grade II* listed buildings in South Staffordshire
- Listed buildings in Himley
