= South Staffordshire Railway Walk =

Rail trail in England

Coordinates: 52°36′13″N 2°09′05″W

- Length: 5.5 miles (8.9 km)
- Location: Staffordshire, England
- Maintainer: Ranger Service of the South Staffordshire District Council

A portion of the cleared railway.

The South Staffordshire Railway Walk is located in Staffordshire, England. It runs for five and a half miles (about 8.85 km) from Castlecroft to Wall Heath. It is a local nature reserve.

== History ==
As the name suggests South Staffordshire Railway Walk was originally part of the Wombourne Branch Line built between 1912 and 1925 by the Great Western Railway Company. However it was not very successful and passenger services were withdrawn in 1932. In the aftermath of the D-Day landings in Normandy during The Second World War it was used to transport wounded allied soldiers to various hospitals in the area. It became part of the Western Region of British Railways in 1948 after the nationalisation of the railways.

The line was finally closed in 1965 under the Beeching Report after decline in traffic throughout the 1950s and early 1960s, with the last train running on 24 June 1965.

== Walk ==
The South Staffordshire Railway Walk starts at Castlecroft and runs for five and a half miles [about 8.85 km] to Wall Heath passing through other villages such as Wombourne where the Railway Café is located en route. It has an all weather surface making it accessible to wheelchairs users, pushchairs and cyclists with free car parking located at Wombourne Station and Himley Station. The walk also forms part of the Smestow Valley Leisure Ride (which begins at Aldersley Leisure Village then via the former Tettenhall railway station) to Castlecroft until Wombourne Station.
