= Wombourne branch line =

Railway in the West Midlands, England

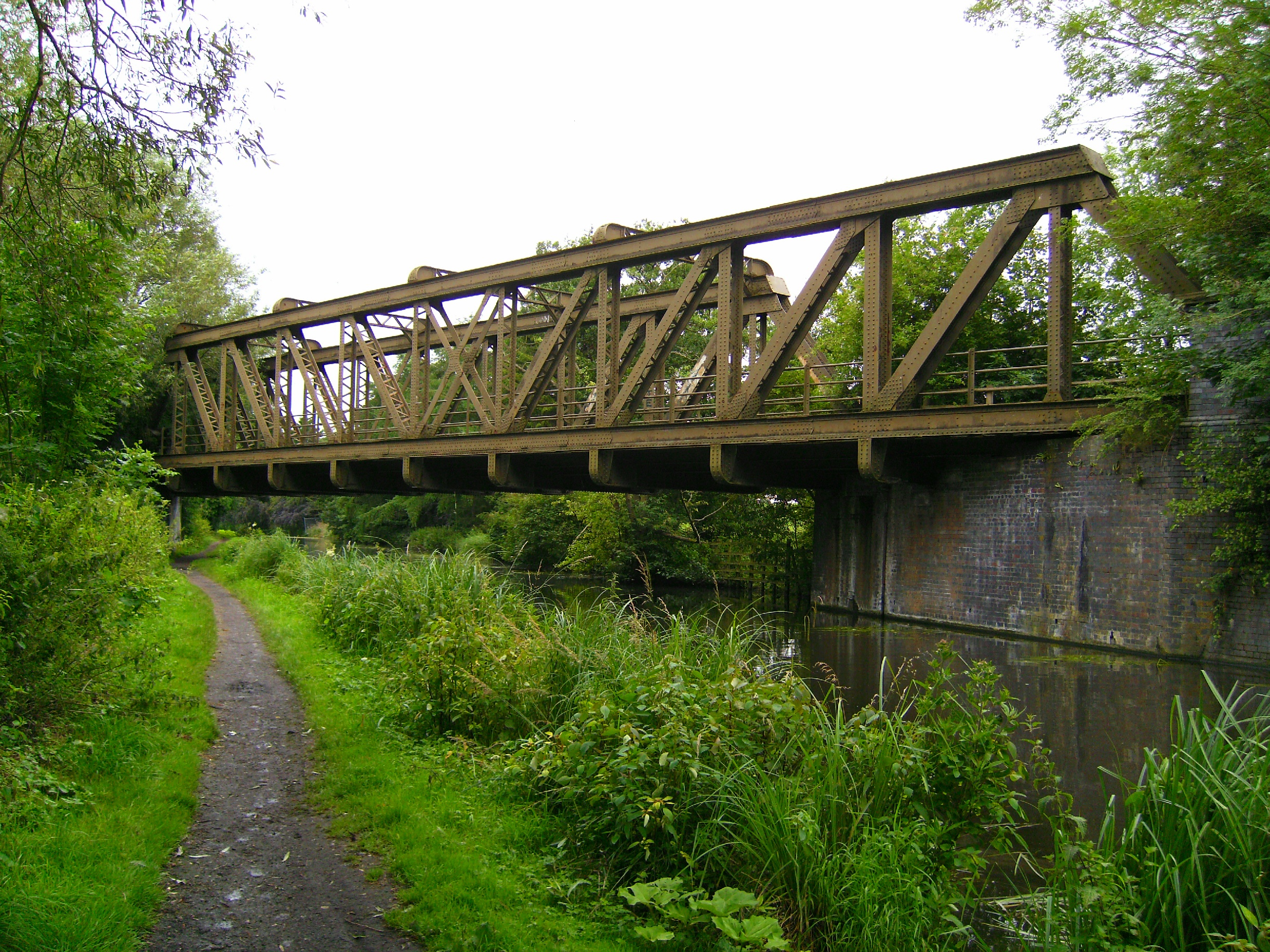
"Meccano Bridge", a steel truss skewed bridge today carrying the South Staffordshire Railway Walk along the route of the former Wombourne branch and over the Staffordshire and Worcestershire Canal in Smestow Valley Local Nature Reserve, Wolverhampton

The Wombourne branch (also known as the Wolverhampton and Kingswinford Railway) was a railway situated in the West Midlands, England. It branched from the Great Western Railway's Oxford, Worcester and Wolverhampton line at Kingswinford Junction to the north of Brettell Lane railway station and joined the same company's Shrewsbury to Wolverhampton line at the triangular Oxley Junction on the north-western approach to Wolverhampton Low Level.

== Construction and traffic ==
The southern section of the branch, known as the Kingswinford branch, began as a goods-only single track line serving local collieries and brickworks. The first 1 1/2 miles from Kingswinford Junction to Bromley Basin opened in November 1858 at which time it was still part of the Oxford Worcester and Wolverhampton Railway. Following amalgamation with the GWR, the branch extended northwards in stages and by the late 1800s had reached Himley. A pre-First World War Railway Operating appendix still referred to the Kingswingford Branch Line as a 3 1/2 mile single track line used for goods and mineral traffic only.

The Great Western Railway (New Railways) Act 1905 (5 Edw. 7. c. xcviii) authorised the construction of a line from Oxley to Bridgnorth on the Severn Valley Railway, to be joined by an extension from the Kingswinford branch at Himley. This scheme was revised by the Great Western Railway Act 1913 (3 & 4 Geo. 5. c. lvi) which postponed the Bridgnorth extension and authorised construction of the Wombourne branch direct from Oxley Junction to Kingswinford Junction, including upgrading the existing Kingswinford branch. The main stations were to be at Tettenhall, Wombourn and Himley with a number of smaller halts.

Construction of the new line began in 1913, but work was halted within three years following the outbreak of World War I. After the war ended in 1918, construction resumed. The Great Western Railway (Additional Powers) Act 1924 (14 & 15 Geo. 5. c. l) which sought to extend the date for opening to 1925 also renewed the authorisation for the postponed Bridgnorth extension. The Wombourne Branch opened for passenger traffic in May 1925, but passenger numbers proved disappointing and services were discontinued in 1932 after just seven years. The Bridgnorth extension was never completed.

== Closure ==
The line between Kingswinford and Tettenhall remained open to goods trains until 24 June 1965, though the branch which served Baggeridge Colliery survived until the closure of that facility on 2 March 1968. This meant that the line had been open for just over half a century when it closed. Its viability was not helped by the fact that it served a predominantly rural area.

The final remaining section of the line continued to serve the Pensnett Trading Estate, developed since around 1970, until that section of railway closed in 1994. The line is now singled and heavily overgrown with vegetation and even mature trees, but most it is still in place and there have been many recent suggestions that this final stub of the line will re-open to serve the Pensnett Trading Estate once again.

== The line today ==
The section north of Pensnett closed is now utilised as -

- The South Staffordshire Railway Walk. The former station buildings at Wombourne station are still in use as a tea-room. Other various relics of this line still exist. The railway walk was opened in 1974, just six years after the last trains used the line.
- The Wolverhampton Railway Walk, which continues the walk northwards and through the Smestow Valley Local Nature Reserve.

In December 2019, it was announced a survey would commence on reopening the Stourbridge to Brierley Hill line to passenger services. Among the survey is a proposed extension to Pensnett. This would reuse the mothballed section to Gornal. This would be a partial reopening of the Wombourne Branch Line. However, it is not planned to reopen back to Wolverhampton.
