= Selly Oak Park =

Public park in Birmingham, England

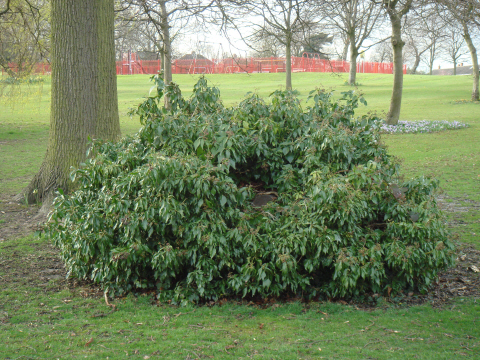
- Selly Oak stump
- Interactive map of Selly Oak Park
- Location: Selly Oak, Birmingham, England
- Coordinates: 52.442829°N 1.946700°W
- Created: 1899
- Operator: Birmingham City Council

Selly Oak Park is a public park in Selly Oak, Birmingham, England. It is close to the University of Birmingham. The stump from the "Selly Oak", a large oak tree on Oak Tree Lane was situated in the park after it was felled in 1909.

== History ==
The park was the first developed under the authority of the former Kings Norton and Northfield Urban District Council. In February 1899, Thomas Gibbins and his wife Emma Joel Gibbins (née Cadbury) and her four sons, William, Thomas, John and Benjamin (of the Birmingham Battery and Metal Company,) donated “11 acres, 2 roods and 5 perches” of land “for ever”, arranging for the Park to be laid out, and a shelter, public conveniences and a park-keeper’s lodge to be built. The park was formally opened by the 88 year old Mrs. Gibbins on Easter Monday, 3 April 1899. The gift was marked by the naming of the adjacent Gibbins Road (formerly Old Lane). In 1911 the district fell within the scope of the Birmingham Extension Order and the park moved into the care of Birmingham City Council.

Following the 1899 gift of land there were four further donations:

- In February 1913, 6.75 acres (2.73 hectares) was donated by Messrs. William and John Gibbins (Birmingham Battery and Metal Company).
- In June 1919, Messrs. William, John, W.W., and R. Lloyd Gibbins (Birmingham Battery and Metal Company) offered another 12.5 acres (5.1 hectares) of land, and a lodge with its garden adjoining the entrance from Harborne Lane. These properties, with tenants, were conveyed to the City in December 1919, and came into park use in September 1922 at the end of the tenancy agreement.
- In July 1935, 0.07 acres (0.028 hectares) in Corisande Road was given by Mr. D.D. James (Excelda Housing Supplies Ltd. – the developer of the new housing estate) to form an access from Weoley Park Farm Estate.
- In October 1950, 2.19 acres (0.89 hectares) of land at the rear of 52-62 Gibbins Road was donated by the Birmingham Battery & Metal Company.

In March 1958, 0.271 acres (0.110 hectares) of land at the junction of Gibbins Road and Harborne Lane (previously used by the City Transport Department as a grit and salt store) was transferred from the City’s Public Works Committee.

In more recent years there have been two transfers of land from the park:

- In July 1980, 0.04 acres of land at Harborne Lane was transferred to the City Education Department, to be leased to the 1st Ariel Scout Group for H/Q building purposes.
- In November 1982, 0.30 acres of land at 187 Harborne Lane was transferred to the City’s Economic Development Committee and subsequently leased for a nursing home.

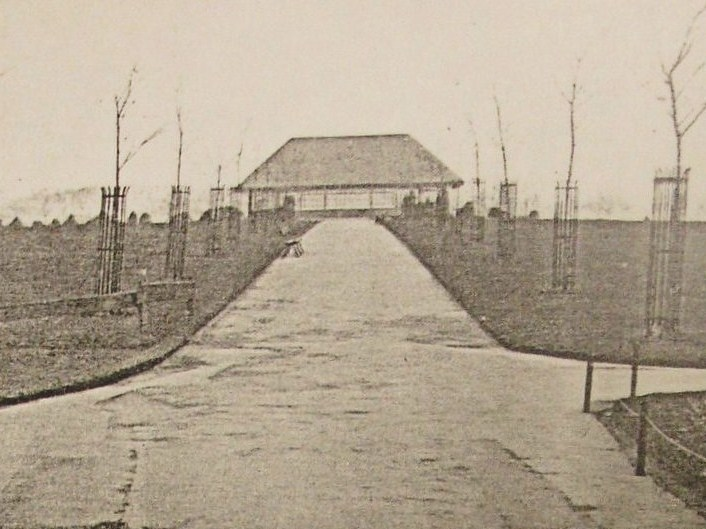
Selly Oak Park shelter

The shelter (built in 1899), the bandstand (built in 1908) and the Daughters of Rest Pavilion (built in 1953) have been demolished.

Today, the Park is maintained for Birmingham City Council by Quadron Environmental Services who provide its non-resident park keeper.

The park’s history is documented in a book, and an associated website.

== Community support ==
In 2011 an active community support group, The Friends of Selly Oak Park, working with the local Council laid out an Art, History and Nature Trail. They also maintain a gallery of park photographs. An annual community event, the Selly Oak Festival, is held in the Park each June.
