= Bournbrook =

Area of Birmingham, England

Coordinates: 52.44685°N 1.9278°W

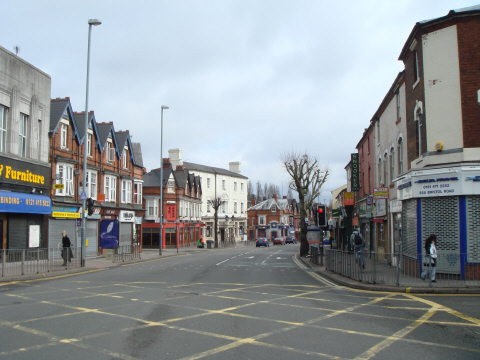
- View of Bournbrook High Street (B384 Bristol Road) looking north towards Edgbaston

- Location within the West Midlands
- Metropolitan borough: Birmingham
- Metropolitan county: West Midlands
- Region: West Midlands
- Country: England
- Sovereign state: United Kingdom
- Post town: BIRMINGHAM
- Postcode district: B29
- Dialling code: 0121
- Police: West Midlands
- Fire: West Midlands
- Ambulance: West Midlands
- UK Parliament: Birmingham Selly Oak

Bournbrook is an industrial and residential district in southwest Birmingham, England, in the ward of Bournbrook and Selly Park and the parliamentary constituency of Birmingham Selly Oak. Before 2018 it was in Selly Oak Council Ward. Prior to what is commonly termed the Greater Birmingham Act, which came into effect on 9 November 1911, the Bourn Brook watercourse was the North Eastern boundary of Worcestershire, and the area was locally governed by the King's Norton and Northfield Urban District Council.

Bournbrook was once known for its Victorian Leisure Park known as Kerby's Pools. The industry that followed the construction of the canals transformed the ancient manor of Selley. The junction of the Worcester and Birmingham Canal and the Netherton Canal via the Lapal Tunnel created a distribution centre for heavy raw materials from the Black Country. Major industries developed along both sides of the two canals. Terraced housing, for the better off working people, was constructed on the former Selly Hill, Selly Grove, and Selly Oak estates. The High Street provided retail, entertainment, and public services.

The property of Sir Henry Gough Calthorpe of Edgbaston was protected by clauses in the Canal Bill prohibiting the construction of wharves, warehouses, and other buildings along with other restrictive concessions. The Bournbrook rifle range, on the Warwickshire side of the watercourse, was opened in 1860 as the training ground for the Birmingham Rifle Corps later known as the First Volunteer Battalion of the Royal Warwickshire Regiment. Trams from Birmingham initially stopped at Selly Oak Gate, the county boundary on the turnpike road, or at the Gun Barrels Public House. Extended services ran at weekends to Kerby's Pools.

Located adjacent to the main campus of the University of Birmingham, numerous houses in the area have been converted from private housing into HMOs (Houses of Multiple Occupation) for students at the university. In response to this practice, fourteen of Selly Oak's community groups have formed a federation 'CP4SO' (Community Partnership for Selly Oak) to address the major issues that the 'Buy to Let, to convert' might be causing. The Local Action Plan, adopted in July 2001, identifies that: an area of restraint was proposed for the area between Bristol Road, Heeley Road, Raddlebarn Road, and Bournbrook Road. Within this area planning permission for further purpose built student accommodation may be refused. Planning permission is required for the conversion of dwellings for more than six people, or where people do not live as a single household. Planning approval may be refused throughout the Plan area, but particularly within the area of restraint."

== Toponymy ==
The name 'Bourn' is derived from the Old English burna or bourne for brook or stream when it had gravel beds and was characterised by clear water and submerged water plants. By contrast 'broc' usually denotes muddy streams with sediment laden with water. Normally both words were used for streams of a considerable size.

== Transport and Communications ==
Roads

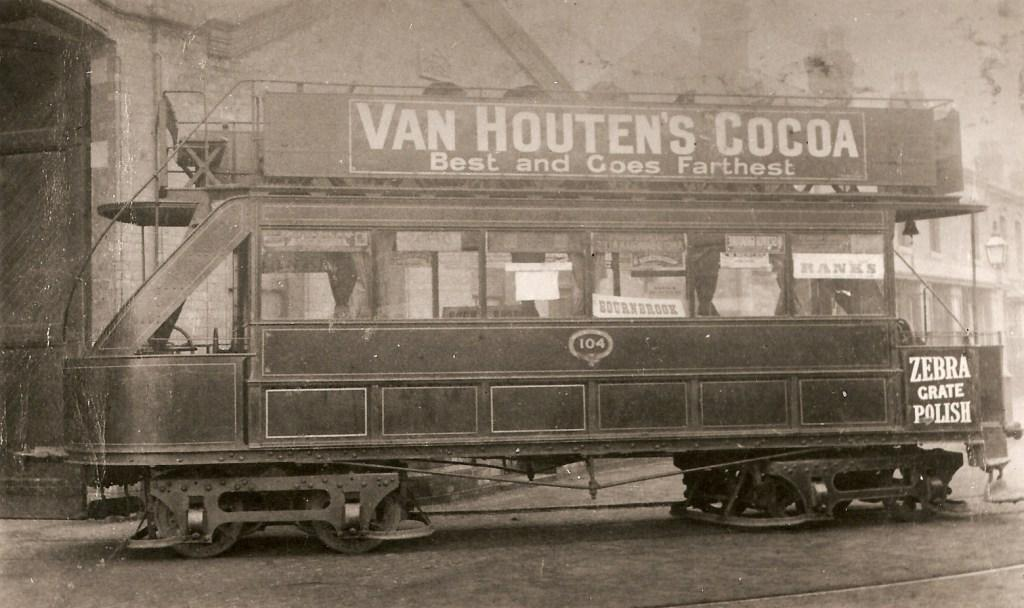
BCTC's Car No. 104 outside the tram shed in Dawlish Road, Bournbrook, in 1891. This vehicle still survives at the Black Country Living Museum.

The Bristol Road was turnpiked in the early 18th century. The original line of the road, before 1771, went by way of Edgbaston Park Road which began opposite Bournbrook Road, alongside Edgbaston Park, along Priory Road, Church Road, Arthur Road, Wheeley's Road, Bath Row, Holloway Head, and Smallbrook Ringway. A new section of the turnpike was made in 1771 at a cost of £5,000, starting at Bristol Street and joining the old road at the Gun Barrels.

The first horse-drawn tram service from Birmingham began in the 1870s and went as far as the Bournbrook Hotel. Hughes ran an experimental steam powered service between Monmouth Street and Bournbrook on 2 July 1880, the latter distance being covered in twenty-five minutes with a car load of passengers attached to the engine. From 1890 to 1900 accumulator battery trams were in use connecting Birmingham to Bournbrook. A year later electric cables were introduced to replace the batteries. The tram sheds between Dawlish Road and Tiverton Road are now the Douper Hall of Residence. The depot in Dawlish Road was replaced by one opened in 1927 in Chapel Lane. The depot in Harborne Lane was used for buses which replaced the trams. The former Bristol Road tram route and its depots were replaced by buses in 1952. The depot closed in 1986 and is in use as Access storage centre.

Canals

The Lapal Tunnel and the Dudley Canal were completed in 1798 and raw materials, especially coal and lime, for heavy industry were transported into Selly Oak from the Black Country and then to the River Severn, or to Oxford and London via the Stratford-upon-Avon Canal. The Worcester and Birmingham Canal commenced in 1791 and was completed in 1815 with the lifting of the Worcester Bar in Birmingham. Industrial activity developed along its banks from Bournbrook to Lifford. The industry stopped abruptly at the boundary with Edgbaston because of clauses inserted in the Bill that protected the property of Sir Henry Gough-Calthorpe by prohibiting the construction of wharves, warehouses and other buildings without his consent. The embankment near Wheeleys Road, gave way on 26 May 1872 causing considerable damage to the properties nearby. By an agreement of 1873 this canal was sold to the Gloucester and Berkeley Canal Co, otherwise the Sharpness Dock Co. A boatyard on the Dudley Canal was established and run by the Monk family for many years. A final roof fall in 1917 resulted in the closure of the Lapal tunnel. The canal continued to be used transporting bricks from the California brickworks. Planning is underway to reopen the section of the canal through the new Sainsbury's site. Eventually it is hoped to re-connect the canal at Halesowen.

Railways

The Birmingham West Suburban Railway line from Granville Street to King's Norton was opened in 1876 with five stations. The single track was doubled and extended from Granville Street to New Street, at an estimated cost of £280,400, so that the Midland Railway had a direct run through the town. It was later incorporated into the Midland Railway and the terminus changed to New Street. During the Great War casualties were brought to Selly Oak and transferred to the First Southern and General Military Hospital which was housed in the new University of Birmingham buildings. The railway was carried over the Bristol Road by an embankment and multi-arched viaduct. In the 1920s the central part of the viaduct was replaced with the current steel bridge in order that the new higher trams could pass underneath. The new bridge followed a slightly different alignment. The arches that were used as by Vincent's timber depot have recently been cleared. The current car park occupies the area that once housed significant goods sidings that could hold up to 300 wagons. The sidings were mainly used for the conveyance of coal and a coal merchant's stood on the site for many years. Bournbrook is served by Selly Oak railway station on the Cross-City Line, providing services to the Birmingham New Street, Lichfield Trent Valley, Bromsgrove and Redditch stations.

== Governance ==
Bournbrook forms part of the ward of Bournbrook and Selly Park, which is represented on Birmingham City Council by two Green Party councillors: Jane Baston and Corinne Fowler.

== History ==
Prehistoric

Along the Bourn Brook evidence has been found of Bronze Age burnt mounds. As these have been interpreted as having domestic use, for beer-making, or saunas the implication is that there may have been a prehistoric settlement nearby. Small pieces of prehistoric, Probably Iron Age, pottery and a piece of worked flint were found on the Selly Park Recreation Ground in 1996 which may indicate the site of an Iron Age farmstead in the vicinity.

Roman

Metchley Fort occupied a site nearby distributing goods such as salt from Droitwich to places further north and west. It is probable that they upgraded existing tracks. At some point they would have needed to ford the brook and Bournbrook seems a likely place with the possibility of local support for periods when the area was flooded.

Anglo-Saxon

Until 1911 the Bourn Brook was the ancient Anglo-Saxon boundary between Worcestershire and Staffordshire (Harborne), and Warwickshire (Edgbaston). The boundaries of the Midland shires were possibly established during the reign of the Danish Kings from 1016 to 1042 based on the former tribal kingdoms. Physical features were frequently used to identify the boundary of a region or estate. The Hamlet of Bournbrook developed at a crossing point of the Bourn Brook. Potentially it was a meeting place for the nobility of each of the shires. The Bourn Brook, which flows into River Rea near in Cannon Hill Park, is the Ward boundary.

=== Bourn Brook Mills ===
The Bourn Brook was in continuous use to power mills for several centuries. Harborne Mill was in Staffordshire until 1891. Pebble Mill and Edgbaston Mill were both in Warwickshire. Another mill was shown in 1787–9 on the most westerly of the streams from Edgbaston Pool where it joined the Bourn Brook near the Bristol Road. This may be the old silver rolling mill owned by Mr Spurrier referred to by Leonard, located near the present Eastern Road that was fed by the brook that ran from Edgbaston Pool.

A miller was mentioned in the Lechmere Tax Rolls for Weleye and Selleye in 1276–82. An archaeological excavation identified that the straightening of the Bourn Brook and the construction of the mill leat suggests that the site of the Bourn Brook Mill was medieval in origin and that a mill or mills had existed in roughly the same location for 500–600 years. Deposits from the relict water channels were radiocarbon dated to the 15th and 16th centuries. The fishponds that the leat drained into would also have to be of late medieval date. Further opportunity to discover the location of the medieval mill will be useful to inform the local and regional research cycles.

In the 16th century the King family had a fulling mill on the Bourn Brook. Henry Cambden the elder, a knife cutler, built a blade mill on part of Gower's Farm in 1707. In 1727 the mill was assigned to Henry Carver, a brass founder. The Gunsmiths, Heeley and Company, is recorded as occupying the mill in 1816. The Tithe Map of 1839 shows the land owned by James Kerby included a forge. An 1861 advertisement for sale of the Bourn Brook Estate (Worcestershire) describes a rolling mill in the occupation of the Bourne Brook Iron Company within a short distance of the mining district. An iron founder and metal roller, Noah Fellows occupied it in 1863. Arthur Holden, a paint manufacturer was the occupant in 1873. From 1880 Frederick Spurrier worked the mill for rolling joined in 1908 by Henry Spurrier.

=== Farms ===
The Tithe Map shows that in 1839 there were seven farms in Selly Oak. Selly Farm was on the corner of Warwards Lane and St Stephen's Road. It was referred to in 1809. It was replaced by a petrol filling station in the 1970s and is now St Stephen's Court, students' apartments. Raddlebarn Farm was formerly Raddle Barn Doors Farm in a reference of 1776. It had 50 acres and was mainly used for grazing cattle. The farmhouse survived until 1974 when it was replaced with a row of modern terraced houses. The cowshed remained until the 1990s being used as a fabric shop and Kaplan's. Bournbrook Farm was at the junction of Exeter and Dawlish Roads. It was owned by John Heeley, a gunmaker who owned Bournbrook Forge and Mill. The track became a road extending as far as the Bristol Road just before the development of the estate began in the 1870s. The other farms gradually disappeared under the pressure of increasing industrialisation and the demand for building land. Selly Hill Farm was converted into Selly Hill House a minor country residence and Langleys Farm became 'The Langleys'.

=== Kerby's Pools ===
The 1839 Tithe Map and Apportionments for Northfield Parish, Worcestershire, show that in Bournbrook James Kerby owned 43 acres of land that included pools, a forge, and the Bell and Shovel Inn. Kerby's Pools was a Victorian pleasure resort in Bournbrook. Its three pools were devoted to boating and fishing and there was also a leisure garden. People would travel in great numbers to enjoy the entertainment and facilities the resort offered. Showell describes it as "a well-known and favourite resort on the outskirt of the borough, on the Bristol Road, and formerly one of the celebrated taverns and tea gardens of past days". There were a variety of attractions and events like fireworks displays. It was one of few spots for fishing within walking distance of Birmingham. There were some accidents: on 17 May 1875 Lawrence Joyce was drowned when the boat upset, and two men were drowned 23 July 1876.

The pools were filled in during the 1880s as the spread of heavy industry and the construction of terraced housing for the workers diminished the rural attractiveness of the location. In 1878 a cricket match was played at Bournbrook. At least 3,000 spectators were present when the game commenced at noon on Wednesday 25 June 1878. This number had risen to 12,000 by close of play. For the first two days batting, bowling, and fielding were excellent. A thunderstorm on the final day resulted in the pitch flooding and the game was abandoned.

=== Selly Oak Institute ===
George Cadbury was a teacher with the Adult School Movement. When he moved his chocolate factory to Bournville he created purpose built Institutes in Selly Oak, Stirchley, and Northfield to serve the working community. In 1894 he extended the coffee house he had built for the workers of the Selly Oak and Bournbrook villages to include a meeting place for the Society of Friends, and for use by other groups. When Elliott needed the Workman's Hall for his manager of the Elliott's Metal Company Ltd the Adult School moved to the Selly Oak Institute located in Bournbrook. The institute is a listed building. It was described as having a large club room containing three billiard tables, three committee rooms, and a large hall suited for concerts and dramatic performance. Various groups met there including a choir and a band. The institute was used by others including the Traders and Ratepayers Association, and the police who held a court there twice a month. In 1899 it boasted a temperance tavern 'The Cyclists Arms'. In 1937 it was the address of the relieving officer and the registrar of births, marriages, and deaths, as well as a Men's Social Club, a girls' gymnastic club, Selly Oak Choral Union and Miss Christine Boyse who taught dancing. The institute continued to hold Adult Education courses and facilitate community groups that have recently been relocated to the Hubert Road premises.

=== Selly Oak Water Pumping Station ===
The tall brick and terracotta building that resembles a French Gothic chapel was the Selly Oak Water Pumping Station. In the middle of the 19th century piped water gradually became available throughout the Birmingham area due to six wells that were built on the outskirts of the city. Although built in the 1870s by Birmingham Corporation Water Department it was not opened until 1879 by Joseph Chamberlain. Following the successful construction, in 1904, of the Elan Valley pipeline the well was retained in case of emergencies but was finally capped in 1920. The beam engine was built by Messrs.' James Watt and Co. and produced 1¼ million gallons each day. The site is now owned by Western Power.

== Community ==
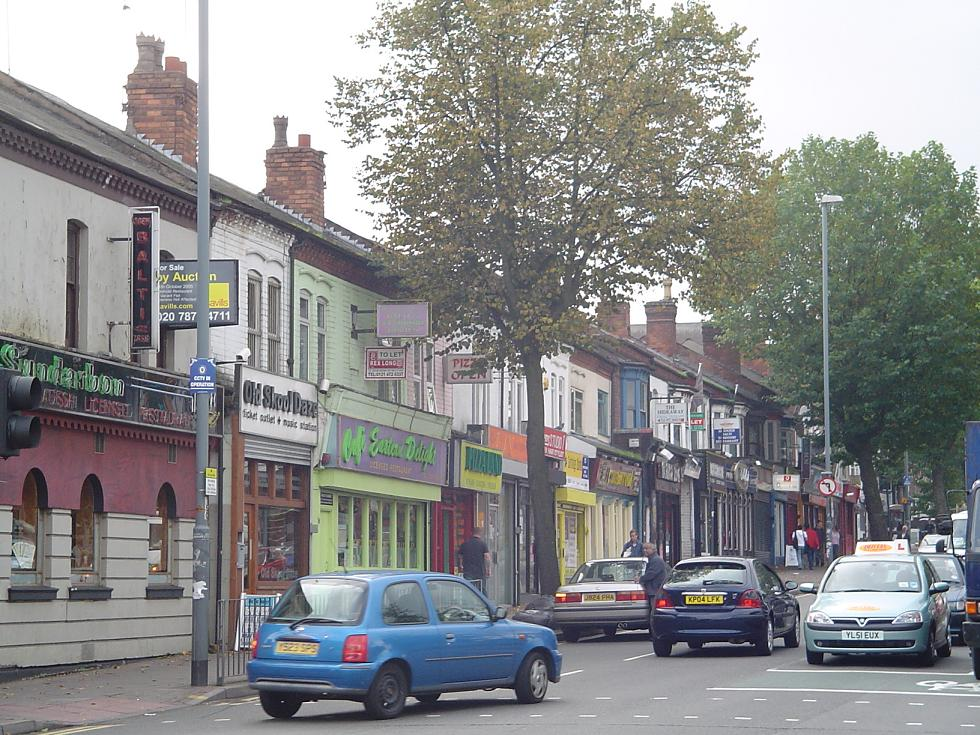
Shops on the Bristol Road (A38 road) in Bournbrook

=== Public Houses ===
Bournbrook Tavern, Bristol Road, was a Mitchells & Butlers pub with an unofficial name of 'The Steps' due to a flight of steps up to the entrance. It may have replaced an earlier pub called the Bowling Green Inn It was replaced by The Brook which has since been demolished and a hall of residence for students is now on the site.

In the 1881 census the Bristol Pear, on the corner of Bristol Road and Heeley Road, was the Heeley Arms the 1881 census shows with Thomas Thompson as publican. It changed its name to the Station Inn before adopting its current name.

Goose at the OVT The Inn was reported to have existed in c1700. On the 1839 Tithe Map the owner was James Kerby and it was called the Bell and Shovel Inn. Under the ownership of George North from 1859 the name changed to the Malt Shovel. Showell records that the public house, belonging to Holt's brewery, having been extended and partially rebuilt, and the grounds better laid out, the establishment was re-christened, and opened as the Bournbrook Hotel at Whitsuntide in 1877. For a short time it was a Firkin Pub, and it is now the Goose at the OVT.

The Gun Barrels was just in Edgbaston. During the late 19th century the pub became popular for prize fights because as the Bourn Brook was the county boundary, the pugilists could escape from the local police by crossing the brook which was beyond their jurisdiction. The pub had been rebuilt by 1987 and has since been demolished to make way for a sports centre containing Birmingham's first Olympic-size swimming pool. An earlier building called The Grinders appears at this location on an 1819 turnpike map. It may have been named after William Deakin's Gun Barrel Manufactory at Bournbrook in 1841. Like many rural inns the pub had an adjacent bowling green which may also have been used for croquet.

The Plough and Harrow was formerly called the New Inn in 1900 (delete) and took the name Plough and Harrow in 1904. The records of the Birmingham District of the Manchester Unity of Oddfellows show a lodge was located at the New Inn, in Selly Oak. The squirrel motif of Holt's Brewery can be seen on the gable. Holts Brewery was founded in 1887 in Aston, but in 1934 became Ansells Brewery Ltd. It was demolished pre 1987.

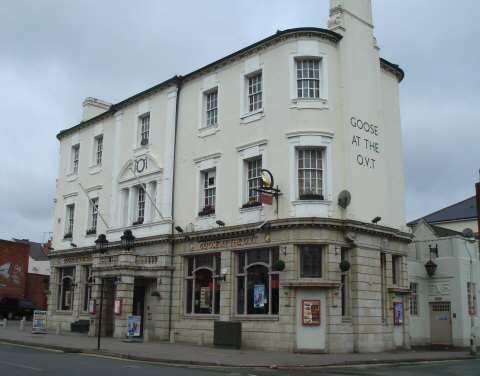
The Goose at the Old Varsity Tavern (formerly the Bournbrook Hotel), Market Place, Bournbrook

=== Tiverton Road Public Baths ===
The Tiverton Pool and Fitness Centre originally opened in Bournbrook on 28 January 1906 as Tiverton Road Public Baths. They were built by King's Norton and Northfield District Council to the design of E Harding Payne and built by a local building firm, T A Cole & Son. There were two swimming baths, one with a gallery for spectators, a children's bath and separate private baths for men and women. The larger men's swimming pool would be floored over in the winter months and the floorspace was used for concerts, political meetings, and dances. A smaller, shallower swimming bath, with steps down into it was provided for women and children. In 1911, it was taken over by Birmingham Baths Committee. More recently it has been converted into a health centre and now includes a "Pulse Point" gym as well as sunbeds and a sauna whilst retaining the swimming pool, the children's pool which is used as a smaller instruction pool and pool spectator seating facilities.

=== Selly Oak Library ===
The land on which the free library was built was donated by Thomas Gibbins (junior), a local councillor as well as being an industrialist. The philanthropic organisation, the Carnegie Foundation, financed the building. It was opened in the year 1906 and is run by the city council.

== Education ==
In Bournbrook there is one surviving primary school: Tiverton Junior and Infant School. St Mary's C of E Primary School opened as a National School in 1860 with accommodation for 252 children. It was enlarged in 1872 and ten years later the boys and girls were separated. St Mary's National School was opened in Hubert Road Bournbrook in 1885 the girls were transferred there and the National School was used for boys and infants. In 1898 the schools were united for administration and called Selly Oak and Bournbrook Schools.

A third department was opened in 1898, in Dawlish Road, to accommodate 545 senior girls and the Infants department. Bournbrook School was used for boys with additional accommodation for 200 boys provided at the Bournbrook Technical Institute from 1901 to 1903. The Selly Oak and Bournbrook Temporary Council School was opened by King's Norton and Northfield Urban District Council in 1903 in the room that was previously used as an annexe of Selly Oak and Bournbrook C of E School. The premises were not satisfactory and the school was closed in 1904 when Raddlebarn Lane Temporary Council School was opened.

The schools were separated again in 1914 with the 1885 Hubert Road and 1898 Dawlish Road buildings becoming St Wulstan's C of E school. In 1946 accommodation was also provided in the People's Hall, Oak Tree Lane. St Mary's National School Bournbrook was closed in 1939 due to dwindling numbers. The Dawlish Road premises were sold in 1940 as a warehouse but bought by Birmingham Education Committee in 1952 to be an annexe to Tiverton Road County Primary School. Tiverton County Primary School was opened in 1906 by King's Norton and Northfield Urban District Council with accommodation for 510 children. Bournbrook Congregational Church provided accommodation for two classes in 1952. The buildings of the former St Wulstan's C of E School were bought in 1952 for an extension to the school. In 1954 the name was changed to Tiverton Road School.

There was a small Quaker boarding school for twelve boys aged eight to sixteen in a building at the junction of Selly Park Road and Oakfield Road. Although no longer a school, the building was destroyed by a bomb during the Second World War and new houses have now been built on the site.

Selly Oak Nursery School was founded in Greet in 1904, but in 1921 the school moved to premises in Tiverton Road which had been equipped by Mr. and Mrs. George Cadbury Junior.

== Places of Worship ==
The following is from the (1964) VCH City of Birmingham

An Un-denominational church in Alton Road was registered for public worship from 1912 to 1945.

Bournbrook Chapel, a brick building seating 250 in Elmdon Road, was opened by members of Selly Oak (Bristol Road) Primitive Methodist church in 1901. In 1932 there was a church membership of 54.

Bournbrook Church Hall, Dartmouth Road, was built in 1932 with seating for 350. The church was formed in 1894 and in 1902, when services were being held in a corrugated iron building, numbered 30 members. For some years after 1902 Dartmouth Road was a mission of Francis Road. The vacant chapel has been converted into the Jalalabad Mosque and Islamic Centre.

Bournbrook Elim Church, Alton Road, was formerly an un-denominational mission, was acquired in 1944. The congregation, founded from Graham Street, had formerly met in a hired hall. The Church membership in 1957 was 110.

Bournbrook Gospel Hall, Tiverton Road was registered for public worship in 1895 and is probably identifiable with the Selly Oak Hall which claimed, in 1892, to have a Sunday evening congregation of 70. It was open in 1957. Tiverton Christian Fellowship began in 1890 before obtaining the land in Tiverton Road.

In 1894 George Cadbury opened the Selly Oak Institute which was used as a place of worship until the new meeting-house was built in 1927. In 1899 the institute consisted of a main hall, ancillary rooms, and a temperance tavern, or 'cyclists Arms'. In 1954 there was said to be an average Sunday attendance at the meeting-house of 70.

St John's Methodist Church was opened by the Wesleyans in 1835, and provided sittings for 108. It was replaced in 1877 by a new chapel costing £2,414 which provided sittings for 350. Important extensions were notified to the Wesleyan Chapel Committee in 1909. In 1940 St John's was described as a brick building seating 494 with a school hall and seven other ancillary rooms. The church originated in cottage meetings which followed the appointment in 1829 of C Bridgewater as inspector of tolls at the Selly Oak locks. There was a Sunday evening congregation of 35 in 1851, and a Sunday afternoon attendance of 118 in 1892. It was enlarged in 1910 and had a school hall. Church membership in 1932 was 150. It closed in 1957 when the congregation joined with the Primitive Methodists. After being used for less dignified functions it was demolished in the late 1970s. Lookers car salesroom now occupies the site.

St Paul's Church was opened by the Primitive Methodists in 1874. The congregation was founded in 1870 and met at first in the open air, then in cottages, and finally in a hired dance-hall, before the first chapel was built. In 1892 there was a Sunday afternoon attendance of 107. In c1908 a new brick chapel seating 500 was built which had, in 1940, five ancillary rooms, one of which was built as a school hall. Church membership in 1932 was 193. It was used after the two Methodist congregations were united until moving to a new Methodist church in Langley's Road in 1966.

St Stephen's, Selly Hill: As the congregation of St Mary's, the parish church grew, a chapel of ease was created in Selly Hill and a Mission in Dawlish Road. Robert Dolphin, who had bought Selly Hall and its farm lands in 1835, donated the land. St Stephen's was designed by Martin and Chamberlain in the decorated style. Contributions for the building of the church came from several notable businessmen: William Docker, Charles Winn, Thomas Webley, and Lord Calthorpe. The first stone was laid on 30 March 1870 and the St Stephen's Church was consecrated on 18 August 1871. The patrons are the bishop and trustees; the living is valued at £200; it is a perpetual curacy, and the incumbent is the Rev. R Stokes, M.A. Of the 300 sittings 100 are free. The parishes of parish of St Stephen and St Wulstan combined in 1980. The Lych-gate was added in 1924

St Wulstan's mission church was consecrated as St Wulstans in 1906. The church was exchanged in 1983 with Elim Pentecostal Church. St Wulstan's is now a smaller church in Alton Road

Three Tin tabernacles or temporary missions are recorded in Bournbrook, Raddlebarn Road, and Dawlish Road

== Industry ==
Industry in Bournbrook was varied but engineering and gun making were significant.

Until the mid-sixties, Bournbrook was the home to Ariel motorcycles owned by first Charles Sangster then his son Jack Sangster, and with their main factory in Dale Road. Ariel was the first motorcycle company to employ noted designer Edward Turner from Peckham to join their established engineer, Val Page. He introduced the Ariel Square Four model and re-vamped their Ariel Red Hunter range. Ariel acquired Triumph motorcycles before the Second World War and, with Triumph, was itself later absorbed into the Birmingham Small Arms group when Jack Sangster joined their board. Although introducing new models, the Ariel Leader and Ariel Arrow, the Bournbrook site gradually lost importance within the BSA group with their final model, the ignominious Ariel 3 being wholly produced at Small Heath.

The Binding Site Ltd was founded 1983 to replace BDS Biologicals which made kits for diagnosing and monitoring illnesses. It occupied part of the Boxfoldia factory in Dale Road during the 1990s until it moved to King's Heath.

Boxfoldia Ltd was founded in 1921 by Charles Henry Foyle. It began in Ten Acres and moved to Dale Road in 1933 where it took over a large part of the Ariel Works. The company moved to Redditch c1990.

Cycle Components Manufacturing Company was founded in 1895 and Charles Sangster bought the trade name 'Ariel' from the Dunlop Cycle Company. It was built on site of Kerby's Pools. An Ariel cycle won the World Championships in 1897. First motor tricycle made in 1898 and the first motor cycle in 1905. About 200 people were employed in the 1930s. Charles went bankrupt in 1932 and the company was bought by his son Jack. It became part of BSA and moved to Small Heath.

Engineering company, Decimals Ltd, were making phosphorus grenades and wire-cutters in Grange Road for the Great War.

George Morgan Ltd, became incorporated in 1933. At the British Industries Fair in 1937 it was listed as a producer of drop forgings for the motor, motor-cycle, cycle, aircraft, shipbuilding, railway, and general engineering industries. They made parts for the Austin Motor Company at Longbridge. They traded from part of the Ariel factory until the mid-1980s.

Greenwood Paige and Co Ltd was established in 1899 by R W Greenwood as fruit preservers. From 1905 until 1915 they occupied the "Seville Works" 193-199 Tiverton Road, which had previously been a steam laundry, Loffets Sweet Factory; Swish Curtain Rails; Patrick Motors Spare Parts Division. Another jam making factory was further along Tiverton Road. most of the fruit used was grown in the West Midlands Region: strawberries from Bromsgrove, currants from Stratford, plums from Evesham, and damsons from Shropshire.

H W Ward and Company Ltd moved to Dale Road c1914. They were very significant producers of capstan and turret lathes. The buildings were demolished to make way for the new road and Halls of Residence for students at the University of Birmingham.

Lewis Woolf Grip-tight Ltd owned a rubber plantation in the Far East. At the British Industries Fair its products were listed as patent pneumatic and non-pneumatic baby soothers, rubber teats, bottles, and flycatchers. They had various premises in Bournbrook: rear of 507 Bristol Road; Old School in Hubert Road for rubber processing; Offices 144 Oakfield Road; 508 Bristol Road shop used for storage; 519 Bristol Road as a canteen. They also used the former TASCOS building on the corner of Alton Road until it was destroyed in a massive fire. A dentists surgery now occupies the site.

The Patent Enamel Company Ltd, founded in 1888, moved to a purpose-built factory in Heeley Road in the following year. Benjamin Baugh had begun to manufacture tough vitreous enamelled sheet wrought iron in Bradford Street in 1857. He combined with William Walters, and H W Elliott to form the Patent Enamel Co Ltd. The products were used for advertising on railway stations, hotels and public houses. Competition and the improved paper posters and plastics caused the business to decline and the company closed in 1965. The site was occupied by several small firms until it was destroyed by fire. Comet moved onto the site and later moved onto the Battery Retail Park.

Albert M Patrick founded Patrick Motors for his son Joseph A M Patrick. Beginning in 1930 it occupied the site of Edgbaston Garage Ltd on the Bristol Road. The company moved to Lakeside in King's Norton where they had a museum of cars called the Patrick Collection. The site became Tesco Express.

From the mid-1930s Sandvik Steel Band Conveyor & Engineering Co Ltd occupied the former tram sheds at 20 Dawlish Road. Their products include: cutting tools; equipment, tools, and services for mining and construction; and materials technology including steel belt process systems. In the 1970s they moved to Halesowen. The Douper Hall of Residence now occupies the site.

The now dilapidated building beside the library on the Bristol Road belonged to timber merchants W J Vincent & Co Ltd. They moved to Bournbrook in 1923 and had other premises including a storage area in Heeley Road beside the railway. In 1975 the business returned to Sparkbrook.

William Westley Richards founded the company of Westley Richards (Gunmakers) Ltd in 1812 although they did not move to Grange Road until 1849. They crafted sporting guns for Edward VII and other members of the royal family. It was a highly integrated factory that mass-produced revolvers with a good deal of machinery. Westley engineering, trading from the same premises, became separate company in 1998. Their business was precision pressing and tool making. They were required to move in order that the phase of the Selly Oak New Road to the new Queen Elizabeth Hospital Birmingham could be completed. The demolition of the factory caused a lot of local protest.

A Wood Turning business operated from Rose Cottage from 1825 until the c1970s. The Rone-Clarke family turned 'woods' for bowls matches. Apparently they also made woods for Triplex to test the resistance of their glass used in airplanes!

Wrights Saddle Company who operated in one of the old Components factories in Dale Road and was apparently closed in 1961 by the British Cycle Corporation.

== Notable buildings ==
In 1907 George Cadbury purchased Rookery Cottages a former yeoman's dwelling on the Selly Hill Estate. The cottages were dismantled and rebuilt as part of his model village, Bournville. He renamed the building Selly Manor and it is now a museum.

- St Wulstan's Church (now the Elim church)
- Bournbrook Friends' Institute, later the Selly Oak Institute
- Goose at the Old Varsity Tavern (formerly the Bournbrook Hotel)

== Notable residents ==
- David Hughes, born Geoffrey Paddison (1929-1972), English popular tenor and opera singer of Welsh extraction, who lived in Alton Road
- Charles Henry Tickle, otherwise Charlie Tickle, (born 1883), English professional footballer who played as an inside forward for Small Heath F.C. (later renamed Birmingham City F.C. in 1905), and who lived in both Heeley Road and Exeter Road

== Bibliography ==
- Brassington, W Salt (1894). Historic Worcestershire. Midland Educational Company Ltd.
- Briggs, Asa (1952). History of Birmingham, Volume II, Borough and City 1865-1938. OUP.
- Butler, Joanne; Baker, Anne; Southworth, Pat (2005). Selly Oak and Selly Park. Tempus. ISBN 0-7524-3625-2.
- Chew, Linda; Anthony (2015). TASCOS: The Ten Acres and Stirchley Co-Operative Society, A Pictorial History.
- Chinn, Carl (1995). One Thousand Years of Brum. ISBN 0-9534316-5-7.
- Demidowicz, George (2015). 'Selly Manor' The manor house that never was.
- Dowling, Geoff; Giles, Brian; Hayfield, Colin (1987). Selly Oak Past and Present: A Photographic Survey of a Birmingham Suburb. Department of Geography, University of Birmingham. ISBN 0-7044-0912-7.
- Doubleday, H Arthur, ed. (1971). VCH Worcestershire Volume 1. Dawsons of Pall Mall. ISBN 0-7129-0479-4.
- Gelling, Margaret (1997). Signposts to the Past. Phillimore. ISBN 978-186077-592-5.
- Hodder, Michael (2004). Birmingham, The Hidden History. Tempus. ISBN 0-7524-3135-8.
- Hooke, Della (1985). The Anglo-Saxon Landscape, The Kingdom of the Hwicce. MUP.
- Hutton, William (1839). An History of Birmingham. Wrightson and Webb, Birmingham.
- Leonard, Francis W (1933). The Story of Selly Oak. St Mary's PCC.
- Lock, Arthur B. History of King's Norton and Northfield Wards. Midland Educational Company Ltd.
- Manzoni, Herbert J (1952). Report on the Survey –Written Analysis. Birmingham City Council.
- Marks, John (1992). Birmingham Inns and Pubs. Reflections of a Bygone Age. ISBN 0-946245-51-7.
- Maxam, Andrew (2004). Selly Oak and Weoley Castle on old picture postcards. Reflections of a Bygone Age. ISBN 1-900138-82-4.
- Maxam, Andrew (2005). Stirchley, Cotteridge, and Selly Park on old picture postcards. Reflections of a Bygone Age. ISBN 1-905408-01-3.
- Page, William, ed. (1971). VCH Worcestershire Volume 2. Dawsons of Pall Mall.
- Pearson, Wendy (2012). Selly Oak and Bournbrook through time. Amberley. ISBN 978-1-4456-0237-0.
- Pugh, Ken (2010). The Heydays of Selly Oak Park 1896-1911. History into Print. ISBN 978-1-85858-336-5.
- Showell, Walter (1885). Dictionary of Birmingham. Walter Showell and Sons.
- Stevens, W B, ed. (1964). VCH Warwick Volume VII: The City of Birmingham. OUP.
- Thorn, Frank; Thorn, Caroline (1982). Domesday Book 16 Worcestershire. OUP. ISBN 0-85033-161-7.
- Tithe Map and Apportionments of Northfield Parish, Worcestershire. 1839.
- Walker, Peter L, ed. (2011). Tithe Apportionments of Worcestershire, 1837-1851. Worcestershire Historical Society.
- White, Reverend Alan (2005). The Worcester and Birmingham Canal – Chronicles of the Cut. Brewin. ISBN 1-85858-261-X.
