= Oak Cinema =

General information
- Type: Cinema
- Architectural style: Art Deco
- Location: Bristol Road, Selly Oak, Birmingham
- Coordinates: 52°26′26.85″N 1°56′20.12″W
- Completed: 26 March 1923
- Demolished: December 1984

Design and construction
- Architect: Harold Seymour Scott

The Oak Cinema was an Art Deco style cinema located at the junction of Chapel Lane and Bristol Road, Selly Oak, Birmingham, from 1923 to 1984.

== History ==
It was designed by the architect Harold Seymore Scott in the Art Deco style, and opened on 26 March 1923 with a seating capacity of 1,111.

It was taken over by ABC Cinemas in March 1935 who refurbished the building and increased the seating to 1,506. The improvements included an air conditioning and heating system which provided over one million cubic feet of air per hour, and maintained a pressure inside the building which prevented draughts entering when doors were opened. The enlarged cinema was provided with a staff of 18, It re-opened on 16 December 1935.

In July 1951, the Oak Cinema was voted the second cleanest cinema in the country and the manager, Roy Fielder was presented with a Silver Medal by A.H. Sayer, chairman of the Birmingham Public Entertainments Committee.

In 1966 the chief projectionist was John Radcliff and the manager was Mr Harris.

ABC ownership lasted until April 1978, when the building was sold to an independent concern. This was short-lived, and the cinema closed on 3 November 1979. The final films were 'The Spaceman and King Arthur' and the Disney movie 'Dumbo'.

The building stood derelict until demolished in December 1984. A Sainsburys supermarket, now closed, was built on its site.
