= Lodge Hill Cemetery =

Municipal cemetery and crematorium in Selly Oak, Birmingham, England

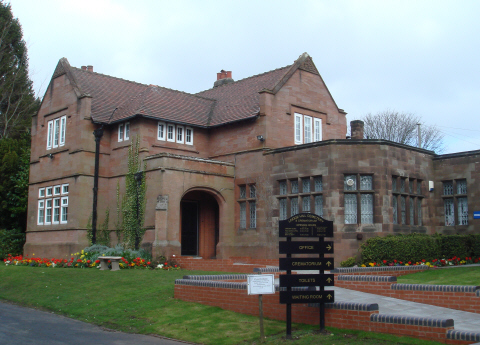
- Offices at the entrance designed by F. B. Andrews
- Interactive map of Lodge Hill Cemetery

Details
- Established: 1895
- Location: Selly Oak, Birmingham
- Country: England
- Coordinates: 52.440°N 1.958°W
- Size: 61 acres
- No. of cremations: 2,200 per year
- Website: Official website
- Find a Grave: Lodge Hill Cemetery

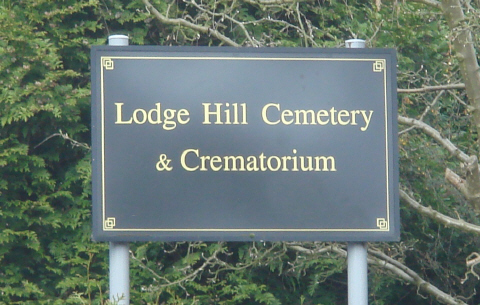
Entrance sign for Lodge Hill Cemetery & Crematorium on Weoley Park Road

Lodge Hill Cemetery is a municipal cemetery and crematorium in Selly Oak, Birmingham, England. The cemetery was first opened by King’s Norton Rural District Council in 1895, and during the 1930s became the site of Birmingham's first municipal crematorium.

Having its main entrance in Weoley Park Road, the cemetery is bounded by Weoley Avenue, Kemberton Road and Castle Road. It can be reached by bus route X21, 48 from Birmingham, Weoley Castle. Nearby is Weoley Castle, the ruin of a moated and fortified mediaeval manor house. Further down the hill the disused Selly Oak to Lapal Canal path runs at a tangent to the site. At the bottom of the hill runs the Bourn Brook.

== History ==
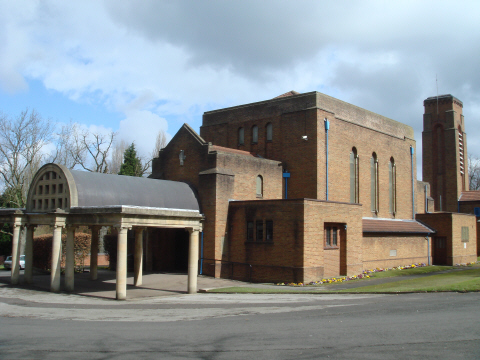
Crematorium building designed by Holland W. Hobbiss

The original cemetery site of 17 acres (69,000 m^{2}) was laid out at a cost of £15,000 (equivalent to £1,705,300 in 2025), which included the construction of offices and two mortuary chapels designed by F. B. Andrews. Although it was opened in January 1895, it was not until the following year that it was consecrated by the then Bishop of Worcester and Coventry, the Right Reverend John Perowne.

The cemetery passed to the care of Birmingham Corporation in 1911 with the absorption of King’s Norton and Northfield Urban District Council following the Greater Birmingham Act. It was extended in 1925 to cover just over 61 acres (250,000 m^{2}), and in 1934 saw the building of Birmingham’s first municipal crematorium. The crematorium and chapel, which first opened for use in 1937, cost £9,000 and was designed by the Arts & Crafts architect Holland W. Hobbiss. The crematorium also has a waiting room and a special room containing a Book of Remembrance, as well as scattering lawns that were landscaped in an orchard setting with terraces. The terraces were later remodeled during the 1990s to accommodate newer kinds of memorials. Since the first cremation, which took place on 4 October 1937, the level of cremations has risen steadily and is currently running in excess of more than 2,200 per annum.

As well as having sections for Church of England, Roman Catholic and Nonconformist denomination burials in general, the cemetery also has a specific Quaker section that includes graves of members of both the Lloyd and Cadbury families, together with a number removed from the burial ground of the Friends Meeting House at Bull Street in the city centre in 1966. Whilst the central crematorium building is still actively used, the cemetery itself has a limited number of graves available for new burials.

== War graves ==
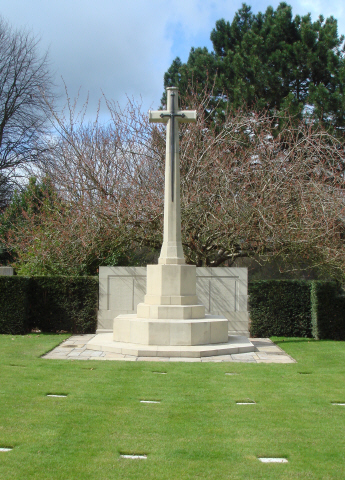
Cross of Sacrifice in the First World War section

The cemetery also has a large number of war graves from both the First and Second World Wars, maintained and recorded by the Commonwealth War Graves Commission (CWGC). This includes 498 graves of soldiers, who mostly died from their wounds at local hospitals during the First World War, and particularly those from when the University of Birmingham acted as the 1st Southern & General Military Hospital, most of whom are buried in the war graves plot in section B10, where a Screen Wall memorial running around three sides of the plot lists those buried in the plot and in graves elsewhere in the cemetery that could not be individually marked. The section is easily identifiable by the Cross of Sacrifice and stone plinth with the words Their name liveth for evermore. Each panel on the screen wall is represented by a number stone plaque set into the grass in the middle of the plot.

In another small section nearby, enclosed by a golden privet hedge, are buried 14 German prisoners of war from the same War, each of their graves being marked by a flat memorial stone in the shape of an Iron Cross.

There are 125 Commonwealth servicemen and women of the Second World War, most buried in scattered graves within the cemetery except a small plot in section 2E.

== Notable burials ==
- Charles McCallon Alexander (1867–1920), gospel singer
- Helen Cadbury Alexander (1877–1969), wife of above, author and heir to the Cadbury's chocolate fortune
- Sir Gilbert Barling (1855–1940), surgeon
- Arthur Hedley (1905–1969), musician and scholar, biographer of Chopin
- Charles Lapworth (1842–1920), pioneering geologist and originator of the Ordovician geological period.
- James Lansdowne Norton (1869–1925), founder of the Norton Motorcycle Company
- Geoffrey Nuttall (1911–2007), congregational minister
- Alan Strode Campbell Ross (1907–1980), linguist
- F.H. Normansell, Chairman of Aston Villa

== Notable cremations ==
- Simon Evans (writer) (1895–1940), ashes scattered at Abdon Burf, Shropshire.
- Alec Issigonis (1906–1988), designer of the Austin Mini
- Anthony John Miles (1955–2001), chess grandmaster
- Roger Tonge (1946–1981), actor who played Sandy Richardson in the television soap opera Crossroads

Within the crematorium chapel is a tablet erected by the CWGC listing 48 servicemen of the Second World War who were cremated here.

== Bibliography ==
- McKenna, Joseph (1992). In the Midst of Life: A History of the Burial Grounds of Birmingham. Birmingham Library Services, Birmingham. ISBN 070930188X.
