= Harold Seymore Scott =

Architect

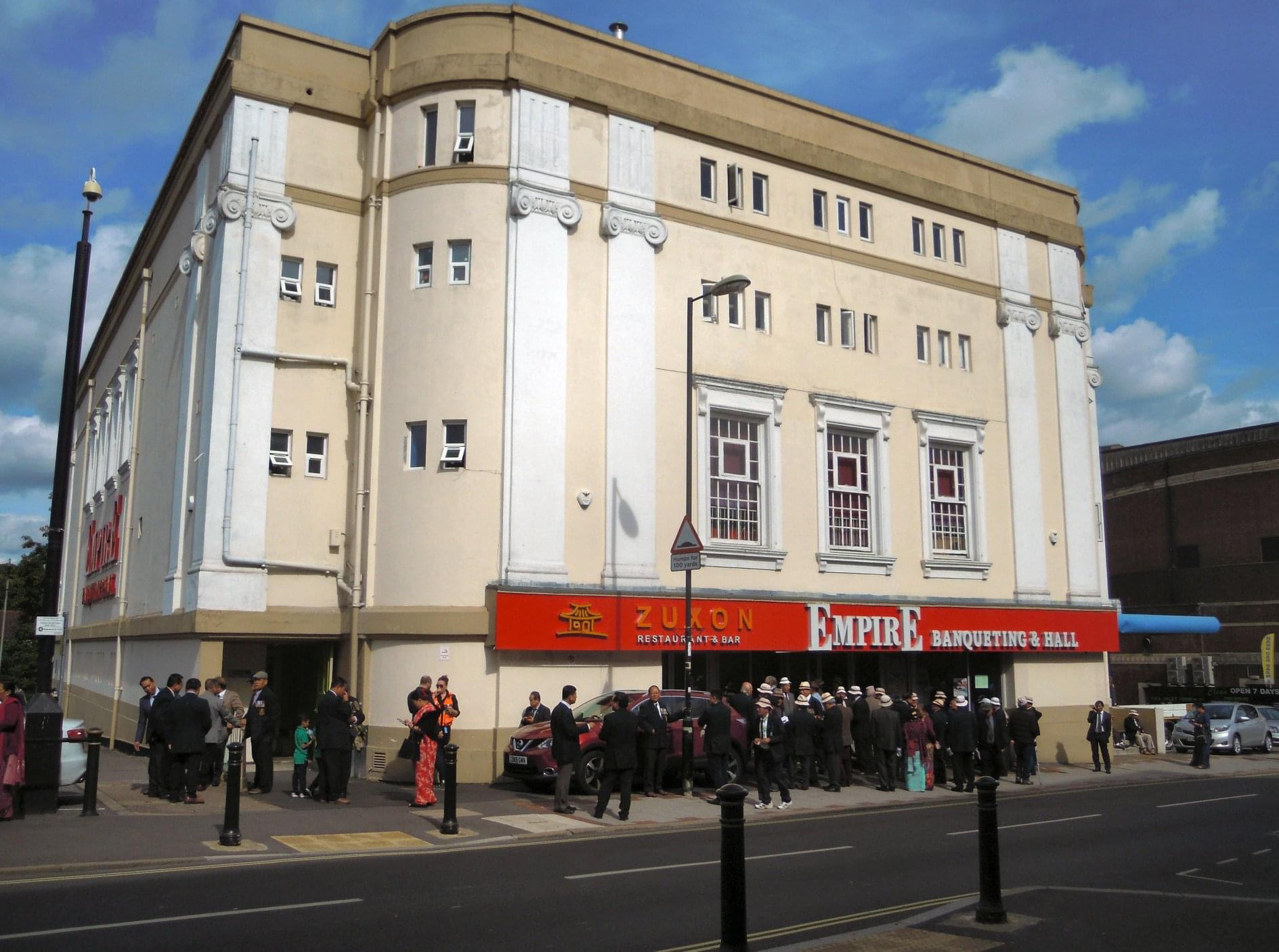
The former Empire Cinema in Aldershot in Hampshire in 2018

Harold Seymore Scott ARIBA (5 October 1883 – 25 December 1945) was a noted architect best known for designing cinemas during the 1920s and 1930s.

Scott was born in Birmingham in 1883, and he was to live and work here for the rest of his life. However, he designed cinema buildings across the United Kingdom. He married Doris Bailey (1890-1939) in 1910, and with her had two sons: John Seymore Scott (1914-2012), and Harold Raymond Scott (1915-1991), both of whom, like their father, were architects. From 1911 to 1925 he was in partnership with Harold William Weedon, the two working together to design several high-quality cinemas in Warwickshire including the Birchfield Picturedrome in Birchfield, completed in 1913, and several upmarket houses in Warwickshire. Scott was an Associate member of the Royal Institute of British Architects.

On his death in 1945 he left an estate valued at £156214 7s. 7. to his two sons, his wife having predeceased him.

== Cinemas designed by Scott ==
- The Empire (1934), Aldershot, Hampshire
- The Piccadilly (1930), Stratford Road, Birmingham
- The Electric Picture House (1912), Birmingham
- Regal Cinema (1932), Camberley, Surrey
- The Oak Cinema (1923), Selly Oak
- Regal Cinema, Handsworth, Birmingham
- Pavilion Cinema, Stirchley, Birmingham
- Regal Cinema (1937), Cirencester, Gloucestershire
- Regal Cinema (1932), Lichfield
- Regal Cinema (1933), Farnham, Surrey

== Cinemas designed by Scott & Weedon ==
- Birchfield Picturedrome (1913), Birchfield, Birmingham

== Other works by Scott ==
- The Wyche Free Church (1911), Malvern, Worcestershire
- Redmarley (1936), 32 Pritchatts Road, Birmingham
