= Selly Oak Pumping Station =

Coordinates: 52.44402°N 1.93691°W

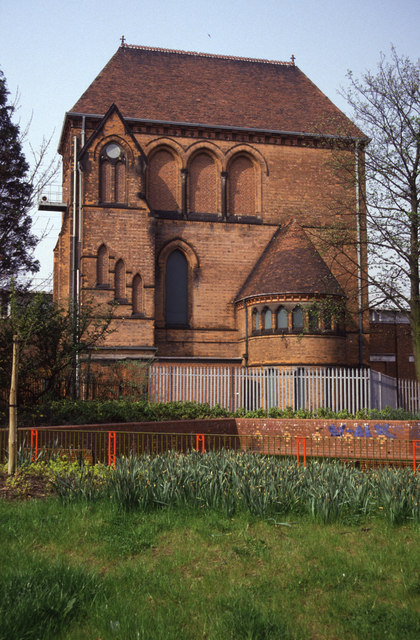
Selly Oak Pumping Station

Selly Oak Pumping Station was a water pumping station operating in Selly Oak, Birmingham, England, from 1878 until the 1920s.

== History ==
It was built by the Birmingham Corporation Water Department in 1878 to house a Boulton and Watt steam engine pumping water for domestic use from a borehole underneath the building. The building is in the Gothic style and was designed by Martin & Chamberlain. It appears as a French Gothic Royal Chapel. The building became unnecessary with the opening of the Elan aqueduct, and it was converted into an electricity sub-station.

It is Grade II listed.
