= Selly Oak Library =

Public library in Birmingham, West Midlands, England

Coordinates: 52.443572°N 1.936386°W

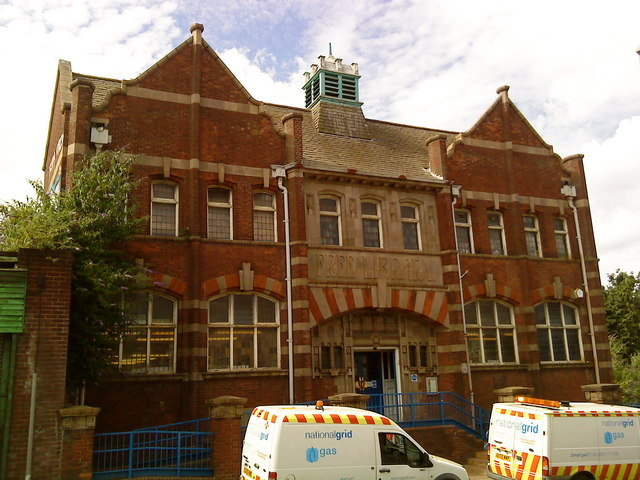
Selly Oak Library

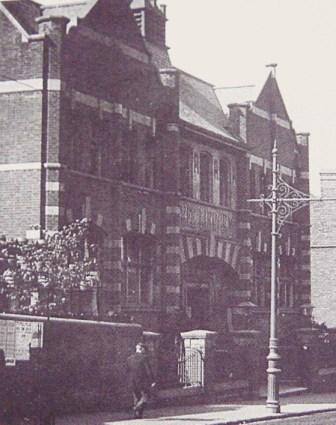
Photograph of the library ca. 1911

Selly Oak Library is a Carnegie library in Selly Oak, Birmingham, England. It is Grade II listed.

This building closed to the public in April 2017. Library provision was moved to Touchbase Pears on Bristol Road.

== History ==
It was announced in June 1902 that Andrew Carnegie had promised to contribute £3,000 towards a free library and reading-room in Selly Oak, following an appeal from Mr E. A. Oliveri.

Selly Oak Library was erected to designs by the architect John P Osborne. The contractor was George Webb, and the foundation stone was laid on 1 August 1905. The foundation stone reveals that the building was funded by Andrew Carnegie and that the site was given by local business man Thomas Gibbins, who owned the Birmingham Battery and Metal Company.

The library cost £3,000 (equivalent to £407,592 in 2023), and was officially opened by Thomas Gibbins on 23 June 1906.

The library reading room was to the south-west of the entrance with an issue desk, stacks and reading slopes for newspapers. Some of the original glazed screens survive in situ.

== See also ==
- List of libraries in Birmingham, West Midlands
