= Birmingham Battery and Metal Company =

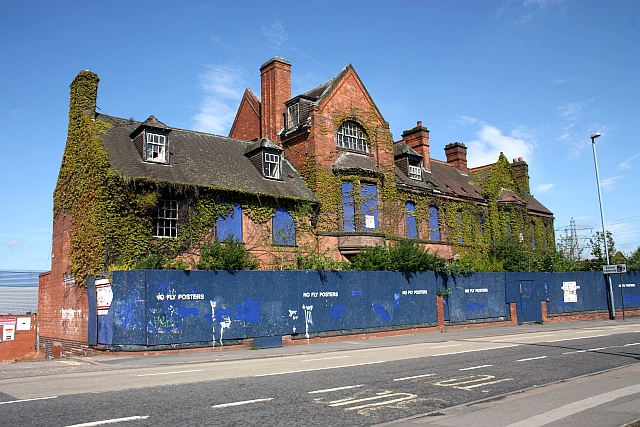
- The main office block which was demolished in 2008 and 2009

- Location within West Midlands county
- 52°26′32″N 1°56′18″W
- Location: Selly Oak

History
- Built: 1871

The Birmingham Battery and Metal Company was founded in 1836 with a factory in Digbeth, Birmingham.

The company did not make batteries, but the use of the word battery in the name refers to a method of metal production and forming (which had largely been supplanted by metal rolling using steam power).

== History ==
In 1850 the company was described as "manufacturers of sheet brass and tubing".

Later known as the Birmingham Battery Company. Additional premises were constructed in Selly Oak in 1871 and by 1876 all work had been transferred from Digbeth. The site expanded with the addition of a copper refinery, a tube mill, a rolling mill and a canal wharf on the Dudley Canal.

In the Diary published by the firm, the following interesting account of its history is given:—

"Nearly a century ago the founder of the firm established in Digbeth, Birmingham, a business for the manufacture of Brass Pans, which were raised from the flat sheet by what was termed a 'Battery ' of Tilt hammers. The process was called the Battery process, and the pans were spoken of as ' Battery ' or Battery Pans.

"The hammers were driven by wheels which contained wooden cogs; the heavier hammers being- used for shaping, and the lighter ones for finishing. The pans ranged from a few inches to several feet in diameter, and varied in depth. The hammers were originally driven by water power and varied in weight. The light hammers would give upwards of 200 blows per minute.

"The introduction of stamped and spun pan, which could be produced more cheaply, caused the gradual decline of the demand for the hammered pan, and about the year 1885, the trade in the latter article was discontinued by the Company.

"The Company by this time possessed well equipped Rolling and Tube Mills, both at Digbeth and at Selly Oak, and the name was so well and favourably known in connection with the manufacture of Brass and Copper Tubes, Sheets, etc., that it was decided to retain the word 'Battery' in the title of the Firm."

The company fell into difficulty in the 1980s and closure became inevitable. The Selly Oak site was redeveloped as the Battery Retail Park.

== Demolition ==
In 2009 the site's owner (Sainsbury's) in spite of the building's grade II listed status decided to demolish the historic office building over the Easter Bank Holiday weekend (while council offices were closed). Safety concerns regarding the building's structure were stated to be the reason for this action. It has caused uproar in the local community however as once the building had been levelled there was little to be done.

== Gibbins family ==
In 1850 the director was Thomas Gibbins (22 April 1796 – 15 September 1863). He married Emma Joel Cadbury (11 January 1811 – 26 April 1905) in 1837.

Thomas Gibbins was the son of Joseph Gibbins (the elder) (18 May 1756 – 31 May 1811) and Martha Bevington (12 October 1758 – 2 July 1827).

The Gibbins family were philanthropists who donated Selly Oak Park and Selly Oak Library to the local people. Gibbins Road, Selly Oak was named to commemorate the gift of the Park to the Urban District Council by Thomas Gibbins. The lay-out was completed and the Park handed over in 1899. Subsequently, a further gift of land by the Firm enabled the Park to be extended to the Dudley Canal.

== On film ==
Take Only Photographs, Leave Nothing But Footprints (2009) (Dir. Dale O'Keeffe) is a short film that explores the inner sanctum of the Birmingham Battery and Metal Company, two months before it was torn down. The film shows how the building had fallen into a state of disrepair, much at the hands of vandals and junkies.
