= List of acts of the Parliament of Great Britain from 1776 =

This is a complete list of acts of the Parliament of Great Britain for the year 1776.

For acts passed until 1707, see the list of acts of the Parliament of England and the list of acts of the Parliament of Scotland. See also the list of acts of the Parliament of Ireland.

For acts passed from 1801 onwards, see the list of acts of the Parliament of the United Kingdom. For acts of the devolved parliaments and assemblies in the United Kingdom, see the list of acts of the Scottish Parliament, the list of acts of the Northern Ireland Assembly, and the list of acts and measures of Senedd Cymru; see also the list of acts of the Parliament of Northern Ireland.

The number shown after each act's title is its chapter number. Acts are cited using this number, preceded by the year(s) of the reign during which the relevant parliamentary session was held; thus the Union with Ireland Act 1800 is cited as "39 & 40 Geo. 3. c. 67", meaning the 67th act passed during the session that started in the 39th year of the reign of George III and which finished in the 40th year of that reign. Note that the modern convention is to use Arabic numerals in citations (thus "41 Geo. 3" rather than "41 Geo. III"). Acts of the last session of the Parliament of Great Britain and the first session of the Parliament of the United Kingdom are both cited as "41 Geo. 3".

Acts passed by the Parliament of Great Britain did not have a short title; however, some of these acts have subsequently been given a short title by acts of the Parliament of the United Kingdom (such as the Short Titles Act 1896).

Before the Acts of Parliament (Commencement) Act 1793 came into force on 8 April 1793, acts passed by the Parliament of Great Britain were deemed to have come into effect on the first day of the session in which they were passed. Because of this, the years given in the list below may in fact be the year before a particular act was passed.

== 16 Geo. 3 ==
The second session of the 14th Parliament of Great Britain, which met from 26 October 1775 until 23 May 1776.

This session was also traditionally cited as 16 G. 3.

=== Public acts ===
Short title	Citation	Royal assent
Long title
Malt Duties Act 1776 (repealed)	16 Geo. 3. c. 1	20 November 1775
An Act for continuing and granting to His Majesty certain Duties upon Malt, Mum, Cyder, and Perry, for the Service of the Year One thousand seven hundred and seventy-six. (Repealed by Statute Law Revision Act 1871 (34 & 35 Vict. c. 116))
Mutiny Act 1776 (repealed)	16 Geo. 3. c. 2	4 December 1775
An Act for punishing Mutiny and Desertion; and for the better Payment of the Army and their Quarters. (Repealed by Statute Law Revision Act 1871 (34 & 35 Vict. c. 116))
Militia Act 1776 (repealed)	16 Geo. 3. c. 3	4 December 1775
An Act to enable His Majesty, for a limited Time, to call out and assemble the Militia, in all Cases of Rebellion, within this Realm of Great Britain, or any of the Dominions thereunto belonging, and to summon the Parliament, in the Cases and Manner therein mentioned. (Repealed by Statute Law Revision Act 1871 (34 & 35 Vict. c. 116))
Land Tax Act 1776 (repealed)	16 Geo. 3. c. 4	4 December 1775
An Act for granting an Aid to His Majesty by a Land Tax, to be raised in Great Britain, for the Service of the Year One thousands seven hundred and seventy-six. (Repealed by Statute Law Revision Act 1871 (34 & 35 Vict. c. 116))
Prohibitory Act 1776 or the American Prohibitory Act 1776 (repealed)	16 Geo. 3. c. 5	22 December 1775
An act to prohibit all trade and inter-courses with the colonies of New Hampshire, Massachuset's Bay, Rhode Island, Connecticut, New York, New Jersey, Pennsylvania, the three lower counties on Delaware, Maryland, Virginia, North Carolina, South Carolina, and Georgia, during the continuance of the present rebellion within the said colonies respectively; for repealing an act, made in the fourteenth year of the reign of his present Majesty, (Note: Trade Act 1774 (14 Geo. 3. c. 19)) to discontinue the landing and discharging, lading or shipping, of goods, wares, and merchandise, at the town and within the harbor of Boston, in the province of Massachuset's Bay; and also two acts, made in the last session of parliament, (Note: Trade Act 1775 (15 Geo. 3. c. 10)) (Note: Trade (No. 2) Act 1775 (15 Geo. 3. c. 18)) for restraining the trade and commerce of the colonies in the said acts respectively mentioned; and to enable any person or persons, appointed and authorised by his Majesty to grant pardons, to issue proclamations, in the cases, and for the purposes therein mentioned. (Repealed by Statute Law Revision Act 1861 (24 & 25 Vict. c. 101))
Discovery of Northern Passage Act 1776 (repealed)	16 Geo. 3. c. 6	22 December 1775
An Act for giving a publick Reward unto such Person or Persons, being His Majesty’s Subject or Subjects, as shall discover a Northern Passage for Vessels by Sea, between the Atlantic and Pacific Oceans; and also unto such as shall first approach, by Sea, within One Degree of the Northern Pole. (Repealed by Discovery of Longitude at Sea, etc. Act 1818 (58 Geo. 3. c. 20))
Marine Mutiny Act 1776 (repealed)	16 Geo. 3. c. 7	22 December 1775
An Act for the Regulation of His Majesty's Marine Forces while on Shore. (Repealed by Statute Law Revision Act 1871 (34 & 35 Vict. c. 116))
Importation Act 1776 (repealed)	16 Geo. 3. c. 8	25 March 1776
An Act for making perpetual so much of an Act, made in the Eighth Year of His present Majesty's Reign, (Note: Importation Act 1768 (8 Geo. 3. c. 9)) intituled, "An Act, to continue and amend an Act, made in the Fifth Year of the Reign of His present Majesty, (Note: Importation Act 1765 (5 Geo. 3. c. 1)) intituled, 'An Act for Importation of Salted Beef, Pork, Bacon, and Butter, from Ireland, for a limited Time;' and for allowing the Importation of Salted Beef, Pork, Bacon, and Butter from the British Dominions in America, for a limited Time," as relates to the Importation of Salted Beef, Pork, Bacon, and Butter, from Ireland; and also another Act, made in the Fifth Year of His present Majesty’s Reign, intituled, "An Act to permit the Free Importation of Cattle from Ireland." (Note: Importation (No. 3) Act 1765 (5 Geo. 3. c. 10)) (Repealed by Statute Law Revision Act 1861 (24 & 25 Vict. c. 101))
Forehoe Poor Relief Act 1776 (repealed)	16 Geo. 3. c. 9	25 March 1776
An Act for the better Relief and Employment of the Poor, within the Hundred of Forehoe, in the County of Norfolk. (Repealed by Statute Law (Repeals) Act 2013 (c. 2))
Duchy of Cornwall Act 1776 (repealed)	16 Geo. 3. c. 10	25 March 1776
An Act to enable His Majesty to make Leases, Copies, and Grants of Offices, Lands, and Hereditaments, Parcel of the Duchy of Cornwall, or annexed to the same; and for other Purposes therein mentioned. (Repealed by Statute Law (Repeals) Act 1977 (c. 18))
Mutiny in America Act 1776 (repealed)	16 Geo. 3. c. 11	25 March 1776
An Act to continue an Act, made in the last Session of Parliament, (Note: Mutiny in America Act 1775 (15 Geo. 3. c. 15)) intituled, "An Act to amend and render more effectual, in His Majesty's Dominions in America, an Act, passed in the present Session of Parliament, (Note: Mutiny Act 1775 (15 Geo. 3. c. 6)) intituled, 'An Act for punishing Mutiny and Desertion, and for the better Payment of the Army and their Quarters;' and for extending the Provisions of the said Act to His Majesty's Marine Forces in America." (Repealed by Statute Law Revision Act 1871 (34 & 35 Vict. c. 116))
Customs Act 1776 (repealed)	16 Geo. 3. c. 12	25 March 1776
An Act to continue for a further Time an Act, made in the Seventh Year of His present Majesty's Reign, intituled, "An Act to discontinue, for a limited Time, the Duties payable upon the Importation of Tallow, Hogs Lard, and Grease." (Note: Importation (No. 6) Act 1766 (7 Geo. 3. c. 12)) (Repealed by Statute Law Revision Act 1871 (34 & 35 Vict. c. 116))
Drury Lane Theatre Act 1776	16 Geo. 3. c. 13	25 March 1776
An Act for the better securing a Fund belonging to certain Persons of the Theatre Royal in Drury Lane, applicable to charitable Uses; and for other Purposes therein mentioned.
Land Tax (No. 2) Act 1776 (repealed)	16 Geo. 3. c. 14	25 March 1776
An Act for rectifying Mistakes in the Names of several of the Commissioners appointed by an Act, made in the last Session of Parliament, (Note: Land Tax (Commissioners) Act 1775 (15 Geo. 3. c. 26)) to put in Execution an Act, made in the same Session, intituled, "An Act for granting an Aid to His Majesty by a Land Tax, to be raised in Great Britain, for the Service of the Year One thousand seven hundred and seventy-five;" (Note: Land Tax Act 1775 (15 Geo. 3. c. 3)) and for appointing other Commissioners, together with those named in the first-mentioned Act, to put in Execution an Act of this Session of Parliament, (Note: Land Tax Act 1776 (16 Geo. 3. c. 4)) for granting an Aid to His Majesty by a Land Tax, to be raised in Great Britain, for the Service of the Year One thousand seven hundred and seventy-six. (Repealed by Statute Law Revision Act 1871 (34 & 35 Vict. c. 116))
Saint George's Middlesex (Poor Relief) Act 1776 (repealed)	16 Geo. 3. c. 15	25 March 1776
An Act for the better maintaining, regulating, and employing the Poor within the Parish of Saint George, in the County of Middlesex; and for cleansing and lighting the Squares, Streets, Lanes, Alleys, Courts, Yards, and other open Passages and Places; and for keeping and regulating a Nightly Watch within such Parts of the said Parish as are not within the Liberty of the Tower of London. (Repealed by St. George's Parish, Middlesex, Improvement Act 1806 (46 Geo. 3. c. lxxvii))
Dundee Beer Duties Act 1776 (repealed)	16 Geo. 3. c. 16	25 March 1776
An Act for enlarging the Term and Powers granted by Three Acts of Parliament, (Note: Dundee Beer Duties Act 1707 (c. 80 (S))) (Note: Dundee Beer Duties Act 1730 (4 Geo. 2. c. 11)) (Note: Dundee Beer Duties Act 1746 (20 Geo. 2. c. 17)) for laying a Duty of Two Pennies Scots upon every Pint of Ale and Beer brewed and vended within the Town of Dundee, and the Liberties and Suburbs thereof, for the Purposes in the said Acts mentioned. (Repealed by Statute Law Revision Act 1948 (11 & 12 Geo. 6. c. 62))
Benthall Bridge, Severn Act 1776	16 Geo. 3. c. 17	25 March 1776
An Act for building a Bridge across the River Severn, from Benthall, in the County of Salop, to the opposite Shore at Madeley Wood, in the said County; and for making proper Avenues or Roads to and from the same.
Elizabeth Taylor's Patent Act 1776 (repealed)	16 Geo. 3. c. 18	25 March 1776
An Act for enlarging the Term of Letters Patent, granted by His present Majesty to Elizabeth Taylor, of the Town of Southampton, Widow, for the sole Use and Exercise of certain Engines, Tools, Instruments, and other Apparatus, for making Blocks, Sheavers, and Pins, used in the Rigging of Ships. (Repealed by Statute Law Revision Act 1948 (11 & 12 Geo. 6. c. 62))
Militia Pay Act 1776 (repealed)	16 Geo. 3. c. 19	25 March 1776
An Act for defraying the Charge of the Pay and Cloathing of the Militia, in that Part of Great Britain called England, for One Year, beginning the Twenty-fifth Day of March One thousand seven hundred and seventy-six. (Repealed by Statute Law Revision Act 1871 (34 & 35 Vict. c. 116))
Navigation Act 1776 (repealed)	16 Geo. 3. c. 20	2 April 1776
An Act for better Supply of Mariners and Seamen to serve in His Majesty's Ships of War, and on Board Merchant Ships, and other Trading Ships and Vessels. (Repealed by Statute Law Revision Act 1871 (34 & 35 Vict. c. 116))
Stroudwater Navigation Act 1776	16 Geo. 3. c. 21	25 March 1776
An Act to amend an Act, passed in the Third Year of His late Majesty's Reign, intituled, "An Act for making navigable the River Stroudwater, in the County of Gloucester, from the River Severn, at or near Framiload to Wallbridge, near the Town of Stroud, in the same County;" (Note: Stroudwater Navigation Act 1729 (3 Geo. 2. c. 13)) and for giving other Powers for the Purpose of making a Navigation from Framiload to Wallbridge aforesaid.
Tardebigg Church, Worcester and Warwick Act 1776	16 Geo. 3. c. 22	2 April 1776
An Act for re-building the Parish Church of Tardebigg, in the Counties of Worcester and Warwick.
Boston Pilotage Act 1776 (repealed)	16 Geo. 3. c. 23	2 April 1776
An Act for the better Regulation and Government of the Pilots conducting Ships and Vessels into and out of the Port of Boston, in the County of Lincoln; and for affixing and setting down Mooring Posts upon the Banks or High Mashes, within or adjoining to the Haven and Harbour of the said Port; and for affixing and laying down Bridges over the Creeks upon the High Marshes, within or adjoining to the said Haven and Harbour; and for preventing Mischiefs by Fire in the said Haven and Harbour. (Repealed by Statute Law Revision Act 1950 (14 Geo. 6. c. 6))
Greenwich Hospital Act 1776 (repealed)	16 Geo. 3. c. 24	2 April 1776
An Act for vesting certain Estates, now held in Trust for the Benefit of the Royal Hospital for Seamen at Greenwich, in the Commissioners and Governors of the said Hospital, incorporated by His Majesty’s Letters Patent. (Repealed by Greenwich Hospital Act 1829 (10 Geo. 4. c. 25))
Boston (Streets) Act 1776	16 Geo. 3. c. 25	2 April 1776
An Act for lighting and watching the Streets, Lanes, and other Publick Passages and Places, within the Borough of Boston, in the County of Lincoln; and for removing and preventing Nuisances, Annoyances, and Obstructions therein.
Camberwell and Peckham (Streets) Act 1776 (repealed)	16 Geo. 3. c. 26	2 April 1776
An Act for lighting and watching the Villages of Camberwell and Peckham, in the County of Surrey, and certain Roads therein mentioned leading thereto; and for establishing a Foot Patrole between Peckham and Blackman Street, in the Borough of Southwark. (Repealed by London Government (Borough of Camberwell) Order in Council 1901 (SR&O 1901/213))
Dorchester (Streets) Act 1776 (repealed)	16 Geo. 3. c. 27	2 April 1776
An Act for better cleansing, lighting, and watching the Streets, Lanes, and other Publick Passages, within the Borough of Dorchester, in the County of Dorset, and in the Tithing of Colliton Row, in the Town of Dorchester aforesaid; for paving the Footways and repairing certain Horseways of such Parts thereof as are Turnpike; and for paving the Footways and repairing the Horseways of such Parts thereof as are not Turnpike; for removing Nuisances, Annoyances, and Obstructions therein; and for preventing Houses or Buildings hereafter to be erected in the said Borough and Tithing, from being thatched. (Repealed by Dorchester Improvement Act 1834 (4 & 5 Will. 4. c. xvi))
Stourbridge Canal Act 1776	16 Geo. 3. c. 28	2 April 1776
An Act for making and maintaining a Navigable Canal from or near the Town of Stourbridge, in the County of Worcester, to join the Staffordshire and Worcestershire Canal, at or near Stourton, in the County of Stafford; and also Two Collateral Cuts, One from a Place called The Fens upon Pensnet Chace, to communicate with the intended Canal near the Junction of Wordesley Brook with the River Stour; and the other from a Place called Black Delph, upon the said Chafe, to join the first-mentioned Collateral Cut, at or near certain Lands called The Lays, in the Parish of Kingswinford, in the said County of Stafford.
Liardet's Cement Patent Act 1776 (repealed)	16 Geo. 3. c. 29	13 May 1776
An Act for vesting in John Liardet Clerk, his Executors, Administrators, and Assigns, the sole Use and Property of a certain Composition or Cement of his Invention, throughout His Majesty's Kingdom of Great Britain, and in the Colonies and Plantations Abroad, for a limited Time. (Repealed by Statute Law Revision Act 1948 (11 & 12 Geo. 6. c. 62))
Stealing of Deer Act 1776 (repealed)	16 Geo. 3. c. 30	13 May 1776
An Act more effectually to prevent the Stealing of Deer; and to repeal several former Statutes made for the like Purpose. (Repealed for England and Wales by Criminal Statutes Repeal Act 1827 (7 & 8 Geo. 4. c. 27) and for India by Criminal Law (India) Act 1828 (9 Geo. 4. c. 74))
Theatre Royal, Covent Garden Act 1776 (repealed)	16 Geo. 3. c. 31	13 May 1776
An Act for securing a Fund belonging to certain Persons of the Theatre Royal Covent Garden, applicable to charitable Uses; and for other Purposes. (Repealed by Statute Law (Repeals) Act 2013 (c. 2))
Trent and Mersey Canal Act 1776 (repealed)	16 Geo. 3. c. 32	13 May 1776
An Act to enable the Company of Proprietors of the Navigation from the Trent to the Mersey, to make a navigable Canal from the said Navigation on the South Side of Harecastle, in the County of Stafford, to Froghall, and a Rail-way from thence to or near Caldon, in the said County; and to make other Rail-ways. (Repealed by Trent and Mersey Canal Act 1831 (1 Will. 4. c. lv))
Bristol Dock Act 1776 (repealed)	16 Geo. 3. c. 33	13 May 1776
An Act to remove the Danger of Fire amongst the Ships in the Port of Bristol, by preventing the landing certain Commodities on the present Quays; and for providing a convenient Quay, and proper Places for landing and storing the same; and for regulating the said Quay, and the Lighters, Boats, and other Vessels, carrying Goods for Hire within the said Port of Bristol; and for other Purposes therein mentioned. (Repealed by Bristol Floating Dock Act 1842 (5 & 6 Vict. c. xxxi))
Taxation Act 1776 (repealed)	16 Geo. 3. c. 34	21 May 1776
An Act for granting to His Majesty several Duties on Coaches, and other Carriages therein mentioned; and several Rates and Duties upon Indentures, Leases, Bonds, and other Deeds; and upon Cards, Dice, and Newspapers; and for raising the Sum of Two Millions by Annuities, and a Lottery to be attended with Annuities. (Repealed by Statute Law Revision Act 1870 (33 & 34 Vict. c. 69))
Loans or Exchequer Bills Act 1776 (repealed)	16 Geo. 3. c. 35	21 May 1776
An Act for raising a certain Sum of Money by Loans or Exchequer Bills, for the Service of the Year One thousand seven hundred and seventy-six. (Repealed by Statute Law Revision Act 1871 (34 & 35 Vict. c. 116))
Pilchard Fishery, Cornwall Act 1776 (repealed)	16 Geo. 3. c. 36	13 May 1776
An Act for the Encouragement and Improvement of the Pilchard Fishery, carried on within the Bay of Saint Ives, in the County of Cornwall. (Repealed by St. Ives Pilchard Fishery Act 1841 (4 & 5 Vict. c. lvii))
Exportation Act 1776 (repealed)	16 Geo. 3. c. 37	21 May 1776
An Act for allowing the Exportation of certain Quantities of Wheat and other Articles to His Majesty’s Sugar Colonies in America, and to the Island of Saint Helena, and to the other Settlements belonging to the United Company of Merchants of England trading to the East Indies, and of Biscuit and Pease to Newfoundland, Nova Scotia, Bay Chaleur, and Labrador, and for indemnifying all Persons with respect to advising or carrying into Execution His Majesty’s Orders of Council already made, for allowing the Exportation of Wheat and other Articles. (Repealed by Statute Law Revision Act 1861 (24 & 25 Vict. c. 101))
Insolvent Debtors Relief Act 1776 (repealed)	16 Geo. 3. c. 38	21 May 1776
An Act for the Relief of Insolvent Debtors; and for the Relief of Bankrupts, in certain Cases. (Repealed by Statute Law Revision Act 1871 (34 & 35 Vict. c. 116))
Turnpike Roads Act 1776 (repealed)	16 Geo. 3. c. 39	21 May 1776
An Act for repealing a Clause in an Act made in the Thirteenth Year of the Reign of His present Majesty, intituled, "An Act to explain, amend, and reduce into One Act of Parliament, the General Laws now in being for regulating the Turnpike Roads in that Part of Great Britain called England, and for other Purposes;" (Note: Turnpike Roads Act 1773 (13 Geo. 3. c. 84)) which relates to the countersinking of the Tire of the Wheels of all Waggons, Wains, and other Carriages to be used on Turnpike Roads; and for explaining a Provision in the said Act, with respect to the Fellies and Tire of Carriages having the Fellies of the Wheels of the Gauge of Six Inches or upwards. (Repealed by Turnpike Roads Act 1822 (3 Geo. 4. c. 126))
Poor Act 1776 (repealed)	16 Geo. 3. c. 40	23 May 1776
An Act for obliging the Overseers of the Poor, within the several Parishes and Places within that Part of Great Britain called England, to make Returns upon Oath, to certain Questions, specified in the Act, relative to the State of their Poor; and to authorize and require the Justices of the Peace, within their respective Divisions and Jurisdictions in the several Counties and Cities in England and Wales, to take such Returns upon Oath, and to cause them to be transmitted to the Clerk of the Parliaments. (Repealed by Statute Law Revision Act 1871 (34 & 35 Vict. c. 116))
Importation (No. 2) Act 1776 (repealed)	16 Geo. 3. c. 41	13 May 1776
An Act for granting a Bounty upon Flax Seed, the Growth of the United Provinces or of the Austrian Netherlands, imported into Ireland, for a limited Time. (Repealed by Statute Law Revision Act 1871 (34 & 35 Vict. c. 116))
Customs Act (No. 2) 1776 (repealed)	16 Geo. 3. c. 42	21 May 1776
An Act for allowing Corn, Grain, and Flour, imported into the Port of Preston, to be landed without Payment of the Duties, under the like Restrictions as Corn, Grain, and Flour, is allowed to be landed at the several Ports mentioned in an Act, made in the Thirteenth Year of the Reign of His present Majesty, intituled, “An Act to regulate the Importation and Exportation of Corn." (Note: Corn Act 1772 (13 Geo. 3. c. 43)) (Repealed by Statute Law Revision Act 1861 (24 & 25 Vict. c. 101))
Criminal Law Act 1776 or the Hulks Act 1776 or the Hard Labour Act 1776 (repealed)	16 Geo. 3. c. 43	23 May 1776
An Act to authorize, for a limited Time, the Punishment, by hard Labour, of Offenders who, for certain Crimes, are or shall become liable to be transported to any of His Majesty’s Colonies and Plantations. (Repealed by Statute Law Revision Act 1871 (34 & 35 Vict. c. 116))
Turnpike Roads (No. 2) Act 1776 (repealed)	16 Geo. 3. c. 44	23 May 1776
An Act for suspending, for a limited Time, so much of an Act, made in the Thirteenth Year of His present Majesty’s Reign, intituled, "An Act to explain, amend, and reduce into One Act of Parliament, the General Laws now in being for regulating the Turnpike Roads in that Part of Great Britain called England, and for other Purposes;" as is to subject Carriages having the Fellies of the Wheels thereof of less Breadth or Gauge than Six Inches, to the Payment of Double Tolls; and for vacating Contracts for leasing Tolls. (Repealed by Turnpike Roads Act 1822 (3 Geo. 4. c. 126))
Loans or Exchequer Bills (No. 2) Act 1776 (repealed)	16 Geo. 3. c. 45	21 May 1776
An Act for enabling His Majesty to raise the Sum of One Million, for the Uses and Purposes therein mentioned. (Repealed by Statute Law Revision Act 1871 (34 & 35 Vict. c. 116))
Mint Prosecutions Expenses Act 1776 (repealed)	16 Geo. 3. c. 46	13 May 1776
An Act to enable the Commissioners of His Majesty's Treasury to order and allow, out of the Money arising by the Coinage Duty, a certain Sum therein mentioned, for the Expence of prosecuting Offenders against the Laws relating to the Coin, over and above the Sum yearly allowed for that Purpose. (Repealed by Statute Law Revision Act 1871 (34 & 35 Vict. c. 116))
Whale Fishery, etc. Act 1776 or the Whale Fishery Act 1776 (repealed)	16 Geo. 3. c. 47	21 May 1776
An Act for the further Encouragement of the Whale Fishery carried on from Great Britain and Ireland, and the British Dominions in Europe; and for regulating the Fees to be taken by the Officers of the Customs in the Island of Newfoundland. (Repealed by Customs Law Repeal Act 1825 (6 Geo. 4. c. 105))
Customs Act (No. 3) 1776 (repealed)	16 Geo. 3. c. 48	13 May 1776
An Act for allowing further Time for the Exportation of, or Payment of the Duties upon, Bugles, when warehoused, upon Importation into this Kingdom; to empower the Commissioners of the Customs to order all Bonds relative to that Revenue, upon which no Prosecutions have been had for the Space of Five Years, (except Bonds for Duties, and for the good Behaviour of Officers in the Execution of their Duty), to be destroyed; and for repealing the Duties upon Feather Beds imported into this Kingdom, and for charging the same with the like Duties as are payable upon Feathers for Beds. (Repealed by Customs Law Repeal Act 1825 (6 Geo. 4. c. 105))
Appropriation Act 1776 (repealed)	16 Geo. 3. c. 49	23 May 1776
An Act for granting to His Majesty a certain Sum of Money out of the Sinking Fund, and for applying certain Monies therein mentioned for the Service of the Year One thousand seven hundred and seventy-six; and for further appropriating the Supplies granted in this Session of Parliament; for giving further Relief to the Widows of Commission and Warrant Officers of the Royal Navy; and for making, forth Duplicates of Exchequer Bills, Lottery Tickets, Certificates, Receipts, Annuity Orders, and other Orders, lost, burnt, or destroyed. (Repealed by Statute Law Revision Act 1871 (34 & 35 Vict. c. 116))
Indemnity Act 1776 (repealed)	16 Geo. 3. c. 50	13 May 1776
An Act to indemnify such Persons as have omitted to qualify themselves for Offices and Employments; and to indemnify Justices of the Peace, or others, who have omitted to register or deliver in their Qualifications within the Time limited by Law, and for giving further Time for those Purposes; and to indemnify Members and Officers in Cities, Corporations, and Borough Towns, whose Admissions have been omitted to be stamped according to Law, or, having been stamped, have been loft or mislaid, and for allowing them Time to provide Admissions duly stamped; and to give further Time to such Persons as have omitted to make and file Affidavits of the Execution of Indentures of Clerks to Attornies and Solicitors. (Repealed by Promissory Oaths Act 1871 (34 & 35 Vict. c. 48))
East India Company Act 1776 (repealed)	16 Geo. 3. c. 51	21 May 1776
An Act for granting further Time for allowing the Drawback upon the Exportation of Muslins and Callicoes, imported by the East India Company in the Years One thousand seven hundred and seventy-three, and One thousand seven hundred and seventy-four; for allowing further Time to the said Company to expose to Sale such Bohea and Singlo Teas and Coffee as remained unsold on the Fifth Day of April One thousand seven hundred and seventy-six, and also such Bohea Teas as shall be imported on or before a certain Time; and for allowing the Drawbacks on the Exportation of such Teas and Coffee; and for granting further Time for allowing the Drawback on the Exportation of Coffee imported in the Ship Shrewsbury, in the Year One thousand seven hundred and seventy-three. (Repealed by Statute Law Revision Act 1871 (34 & 35 Vict. c. 116))
Natural-born Children of Aliens Act 1776 (repealed)	16 Geo. 3. c. 52	21 May 1776
An Act to declare His Majesty’s natural-born Subjects inheritable to the Estates of their Ancestors, whether lineal or collateral, in that Part of Great Britain called Scotland, notwithstanding their Father or Mother were Aliens. (Repealed by Naturalization Act 1870 (33 & 34 Vict. c. 14))
Isle of Wight Guardians Act 1776	16 Geo. 3. c. 53	13 May 1776
An Act to continue the Corporation of the Guardians of the Poor within the Isle of Wight, and to confirm the Powers and Authorities now veiled in the said Corporation, and to provide new Powers and Regulations for the Members of the same; and to repeal an Act, passed in the Eleventh Year of the Reign of His present Majesty, intituled, "An Act for establishing a House or Houses of Industry in the isle of Wight, for the Reception, Maintenance, and Employment of the Poor belonging to the several Parishes and Places within the said Island." (Note: Isle of Wight (Poor Relief) Act 1771 (11 Geo. 3. c. 43))
Continuance of Laws Act 1776 (repealed)	16 Geo. 3. c. 54	21 May 1776
An Act to continue an Act, made in the Fifth Year of the Reign of His late Majesty King George the Second, intituled, "An Act to prevent the committing of Frauds by Bankrupts;" (Note: Bankrupts Act 1731 (5 Geo. 2. c. 30)) and also an Act, made in the Fourteenth Year of the Reign of His present Majesty, intituled, "An Act to prohibit the Importation of light Silver Coin of this Realm from Foreign Countries into Great Britain or Ireland, and to restrain the Tender thereof beyond a certain Sum." (Note: Light Silver Coin Act 1774 (14 Geo. 3. c. 42)) (Repealed by Statute Law Revision Act 1871 (34 & 35 Vict. c. 116))
Booth's Charity, Salford Act 1776	16 Geo. 3. c. 55	21 May 1776
An Act to enable the Trustees of certain Charity Lands, belonging to the Poor of Salford, in the County Palatine of Lancaster, to grant Building Leases thereof.
Brecknock Water Supply Act 1776	16 Geo. 3. c. 56	13 May 1776
An Act for supplying the Borough and Town of Brecknock, and Liberties thereof, with Water; and for paving, cleansing, regulating, and lighting the Streets, Lanes, and publick Passages there; and for widening and making commodious some of the said Streets, Lanes, and Passages.
Weymouth (Improvement) Act 1776	16 Geo. 3. c. 57	13 May 1776
An Act for paving, cleansing, lighting, and watching, the Borough and Town of Weymouth and Melcombe Regis, in the County of Dorset; and for removing all Encroachments, Obstructions, and Annoyances therein.
Chatham (Improvement) Act 1776 (repealed)	16 Geo. 3. c. 58	21 May 1776
An Act to explain and amend an Act, made in the Twelfth Year of His present Majesty, (Note: Chatham (Streets) Act 1772 (12 Geo. 3. c. 18)) for paving, cleansing, lighting, and watching, the Streets and Lanes in the Town and Parish of Chatham, in the County of Kent, and for removing and preventing Nuisances and Annoyances therein; and to extend the Provisions of the said Act to such Parts of the High Street in Chatham, as are situate in the Parishes of Saint Margaret and Gillingham, and to other Places adjoining or contiguous to the said Town. (Repealed by Local Government Supplemental Act 1860 (No. 2) (23 & 24 Vict. c. 118))
Portsmouth (Streets) Act 1776 (repealed)	16 Geo. 3. c. 59	13 May 1776
An Act for lighting and watching the Town, of Portsmouth, in the County of Southampton; and for explaining and amending an Act, passed in the Eighth Year of His present Majesty's Reign, (Note: Portsmouth Improvement Act 1768 (8 Geo. 3. c. 62)) for the better paving and cleansing the Streets, and other publick Passages in the said Town, and for preventing Nuisances and Annoyances therein, and for widening and rendering the same more commodious. (Repealed by Portsmouth Improvement Act 1847 (10 & 11 Vict. c. cclvii))
Shoreditch Streets Act 1776 (repealed)	16 Geo. 3. c. 60	22 December 1775
An Act to amend and render more effectual an Act, made in the Eighth Year of the Reign of His present Majesty, (Note: Shoreditch Streets Act 1768 (8 Geo. 3. c. 33)) for opening certain Passages, and for paving the Streets and other Places, in the Parish of Saint Leonard Shoreditch, in the County of Middlesex, and for preventing Annoyances therein; and for extending the Powers of the said Act to such Part of a Lane called Hog Lane, as lies within the Liberty of Norton Falgate, in the said County. (Repealed by Statute Law (Repeals) Act 2013 (c. 2))
Chester Lighthouse Act 1776	16 Geo. 3. c. 61	21 May 1776
An Act for erecting a Lighthouse or Lighthouses, and Land Marks, in or near the Port of Chester; and for placing Buoys upon the Banks and Shoals leading into and in the said Port; and for regulating of Pilots and Persons towing or tracking of Vessels to and from the City of Chester; and for fixing the Rates payable for the same respectively.
East Kent (Drainage) Act 1776	16 Geo. 3. c. 62	21 May 1776
An Act to enable the Commissioners of Sewers for several Limits in the Eastern Parts of the County of Kent, more effectually to drain and improve the Lands and Grounds, within The General Vallies.
Manchester (Streets) Act 1776	16 Geo. 3. c. 63	13 May 1776
An Act for widening and improving several Streets in the Town of Manchester; and for opening new Streets or Passages within the said Town.
Fen Drainage Act 1776	16 Geo. 3. c. 64	13 May 1776
An Act for draining, embanking, and preserving certain Fen Lands and Low Grounds, called The Parts and Alderlots, in the Parishes of Glatton and Holme, in the County of Huntingdon.
Loughborough Navigation Act 1776	16 Geo. 3. c. 65	2 April 1776
An Act for making the River Soar navigable from the River Trent to Bishop's Meadow, within the Liberty of Garenton, in the County of Leicester; and for making and maintaining a Navigable Cut or Canal from thence, near, or up, and into The Rushes, at Loughborough, in the said County.
Dudley Canal Act 1776 (repealed)	16 Geo. 3. c. 66	2 April 1776
An Act for making and maintaining a Navigable Canal within and from certain Lands belonging to Thomas Talbot Foley Esquire, in the Parish of Dudley, in the County of Worcester, to join and communicate with the Stourbridge Navigation at a Place called Black Delph, upon Pensnet Chace, in the Parish of Kingswinford, in the County of Stafford. (Repealed by Birmingham and Dudley Canal Consolidation Act 1846 (9 & 10 Vict. c. cclix))
Stockbridge Road Act 1776 (repealed)	16 Geo. 3. c. 67	22 December 1775
An Act for enlarging the Term and Powers of So much of an Act, made in the Twenty-ninth Year of the Reign of His Majesty King George the Second, intituled, "An Act for repairing and widening the High Roads from Basingstoke, through Popham Lane, Sutton Scotney, and Stockbridge, in the County of Southampton, to a Place called Lobcomb Corner, in the County of Wilts; and also for repairing and widening the Road from Spittle House, over Weyhill, to Mullen's Pond, in the said County of Southampton;" (Note: Stockbridge Roads Act 1756 (29 Geo. 2. c. 46)) as relates to the Roads from Basingstoke to Lobcomb Corner, in the County of Wilts. (Repealed by Basingstoke, Stockbridge and Lobcomb Corner Turnpike Roads Act 1855 (18 & 19 Vict. c. civ))
Northumberland Roads Act 1776 (repealed)	16 Geo. 3. c. 68	22 December 1775
An Act to enlarge the Term and Powers of an Act, passed in the Twenty-second Year of the Reign of His late Majesty, intituled, "An Act for repairing the Road from the West Cowgate, near the Town of Newcastle upon Tyne, through the West End of Kenton, Pont Eland, Higham Dykes, Newham Edge, Belsay Mill, and South Middleton, to the North Side of the River Wanspeck, in the County of Northumberland." (Note: Northumberland Roads Act 1748 (22 Geo. 2. c. 7)) (Repealed by West Cowgate and Alemouth Road Act 1797 (37 Geo. 3. c. 163))
Kent Roads Act 1776 (repealed)	16 Geo. 3. c. 69	25 March 1776
An Act for continuing the Term and varying the Powers of Two Acts, passed in the Third (Note: Kent Roads Act 1729 (3 Geo. 2. c. 15)) and Seventeenth (Note: Kent Roads Act 1743 (17 Geo. 2. c. 4)) Years of His late Majesty King George the Second, for repairing the Road from that Part of Chatham which lies next to the City of Rochester, to Saint Dunstan’s Cross, near the City of Canterbury, in the County of Kent; and for amending and widening the Road from the present Turnpike Road, at or near a Place called Makenade Corner, in the Parish of Preston, to Bagham Cross and Shalmsford Lane End, in the Parish of Chilham, in the said County. (Repealed by Chatham and Canterbury Road Act 1812 (52 Geo. 3. c. lxxxi))
Surrey and Sussex Roads Act 1776 (repealed)	16 Geo. 3. c. 70	25 March 1776
An Act for continuing the Term, and enlarging the Powers of an Act, made in the Twenty-eighth Year of the Reign of His late Majesty, (Note: Sussex and Surrey Roads Act 1755 (28 Geo. 2. c. 45)) for widening and repairing the Road leading from Horsham, in the County of Sussex, through Capell, Dorking, Mickleham, and Leatherhead, to the Watch House in Ebbisham, in the County of Surrey, and from Capell to Stone Street, in the Parish of Ockley in the said County of Surrey. (Repealed by Road from Horsham to Epsom Act 1823 (4 Geo. 4. c. lxxxvi))
Doncaster to Bawtry Roads Act 1776 (repealed)	16 Geo. 3. c. 71	25 March 1776
An Act for amending and keeping in Repair the Road from Doncaster to the Turnpike Road which leads from Bawtry to Retford, in the Counties of York and Nottingham. (Repealed by Road from Doncaster to Bawtry Act 1832 (2 & 3 Will. 4. c. xx))
Northants and Lincoln Roads Act 1776 (repealed)	16 Geo. 3. c. 72	2 April 1776
An Act for enlarging the Term and Powers of an Act, made in the Twenty-ninth Year of the Reign of His Majesty King George the Second, intituled, "An Act for repairing and widening the Roads leading from the East Side of Lincoln Heath to the City of Peterborough and from the East End of Marham Lane to the Town of Walton, in the County of Northampton, and from the Town of Bourn to the Town of Colsterworth; and from Donnington High Bridge to the Cross Post in the Parish of Hacconby; and from the East End of a Lane called Hale-drove, to and through the Town of Old Sleaford, to the End of Long Hedge, in the Parish of Quarrington, in the County of Lincoln." (Note: Lincoln and Peterborough Roads Act 1756 (29 Geo. 2. c. 85)) (Repealed by Lincoln Heath and Peterborough and Bourn and Spalding Roads Act 1822 (3 Geo. 4. c. lxvi))
Derby and Yorks Roads Act 1776 (repealed)	16 Geo. 3. c. 73	25 March 1776
An Act for enlarging the Term and Powers of an Act, made in the Twenty-ninth Year of the Reign of His Majesty King George the Second, intituled, "An Act for repairing and widening the Road from the White Stoop near the North End of the Town of Derby, through the Towns of Duffield and Chesterfield, in the County of Derby, to the Town of Sheffield in the County of York; and from the said Town of Duffield to the Moot Hall in the Town of Wirksworth, in the said County of Derby." (Note: Derby and Sheffield Roads Act 1756 (29 Geo. 2. c. 82)) (Repealed by Derby, Duffield, Wirksworth and Sheffield Turnpike Road Act 1851 (14 & 15 Vict. c. xxxvii))
Stamford Roads Act 1776 (repealed)	16 Geo. 3. c. 74	25 March 1776
An Act for enlarging the Term and Powers of Two Acts, made in the Twenty-second (Note: Northamptonshire Roads Act 1748 (22 Geo. 2. c. 17)) and Twenty-ninth (Note: Northamptonshire and Lincoln Roads Act 1756 (29 Geo. 2. c. 76)) Years of the Reign of King George the Second, for repairing the Road from Wansford Bridge, in the County of Northampton, to the Town and Borough of Stamford, in the County of Lincoln, and from Stamford to Bourn, in the said County; and for repairing and widening the Road from the North End of the Bridge (Note: The Town Bridge in Stamford. 52°39′01″N 0°28′41″W) to a Gate called Scotgate, (Note: Scot Gate was located in the town walls of Stamford, at a location that is now a junction between the B1081/A606 Scotgate, and the A6121 West Street/North Street. 52°39′10″N 0°29′01″W) in Stamford, and from the Termination of the Turnpike Road in the Parish of Bourn to the Market Cross in Bourn. (Note: The market cross in Bourne was located at the junction of the A15 North Street/South Street and the B1193 West Street/Abbey Road. 52°46′05″N 0°22′38″W) (Repealed by Wansford Bridge and Bourn Road Act 1820 (1 Geo. 4. c. xxii))
Blackburn Roads Act 1776 (repealed)	16 Geo. 3. c. 75	25 March 1776
An Act for repairing and widening the Road from the Market Cross, in the Township of Clithero, to Salford Bridge, in the Town of Blackburn, in the County Palatine of Lancaster. (Repealed by Road from Clitheroe to Blackburn Act 1808 (48 Geo. 3. c. xxxiii) and Road from Clitheroe to Blackburn Act 1819 (59 Geo. 3. c. li))
Highgate and Hampstead Roads Act 1776 (repealed)	16 Geo. 3. c. 76	21 May 1776
An Act to continue and render more effectual several Acts of Parliament, for repairing the Highways leading to Highgate Gatehouse and Hampstead, and other Roads in the said Acts mentioned, in the County of Middlesex; and also to continue and render more effectual an Act (Note: Highgate and Hampstead Roads Act 1756 (29 Geo. 2. c. 88)) to enable the respective Trustees of the Turnpike Roads leading to Highgate Gatehouse and Hampstead, and from Saint Giles's Pound to Kilbourn, to make a new Road from the Great Northern Road at Islington to the Edgware Road near Paddington, so far as the same is by the said Act directed to be under the Care and Management of the Trustees of the said first mentioned Acts; and for making a Road from the said new Road, near Queen’s Row, to Bagnigge Wash; and for watching, lighting, and watering, the said Roads. (Repealed by St. Pancras Improvement Act 1812 (52 Geo. 3. c. lxxiv) and Roads to Highgate House and Hampstead Act 1821 (1 & 2 Geo. 4. c. cx))
Salop and Hereford Roads Act 1776 (repealed)	16 Geo. 3. c. 77	13 May 1776
An Act to enlarge the Term and Powers of an Act, passed in the Twenty-fourth Year of the Reign of His Majesty King George the Second, (Note: Ludlow and Monk's Bridge Road Act 1750 (24 Geo. 2. c. 29)) for repairing the Road leading from the Town of Ludlow, in the County of Salop, through Woofferton and Little Hereford, to a Place called Monk's Bridge in the said County; and also from the said Town of Ludlow, to a Place or House called The Maidenhead, at Orleton, in the County of Hereford. (Repealed by Road from Ludlow to Monk's Bridge Act 1820 (1 Geo. 4. c. xxxiv))
Worcestershire Roads Act 1776 (repealed)	16 Geo. 3. c. 78	13 May 1776
An Act for continuing the Term, and altering, explaining, and enlarging the Powers of an Act of the Twenty-sixth of King George the Second, (Note: Worcester Roads Act 1753 (26 Geo. 2. c. 50)) for repairing and widening several Roads therein mentioned in the County of Worcester; and for repealing so much of an Act of the Seventh Year of His present Majesty, (Note: Worcester Roads Act 1766 (7 Geo. 3. c. 65)) as relates to the Road from Knightsford Bridge to a certain House at Red Marley, in the Parish of Great Witley, in the said County; and for putting the same under the Management of the Trustees for executing the said first-mentioned Act; and for amending other Roads therein mentioned. (Repealed by Hundred House (Worcestershire) Roads Act 1800 (39 & 40 Geo. 3. c. xcv))
Ashburton Roads Act 1776 (repealed)	16 Geo. 3. c. 79	13 May 1776
An Act for continuing and enlarging the Terms and Powers of Two several Acts of Parliament, (Note: Devon Roads Act 1755 (28 Geo. 2. c. 49)) (Note: Devon Roads Act 1760 (1 Geo. 3. c. 34)) respecting Roads near the Borough of Ashburton, in the County of Devon. (Repealed by Newton Bushell, South Bovey and Moretonhampstead Roads Act 1826 (7 Geo. 4. c. xcii))
Warwick and Northampton Road Act 1776 (repealed)	16 Geo. 3. c. 80	13 May 1776
An Act to enlarge the Term and Powers of an Act, passed in the Fifth Year of His present Majesty's Reign, (Note: Warwick and Northampton Road Act 1765 (5 Geo. 3. c. 107)) for repairing and widening the Road from the Great Bridge, (Note: Old Castle Bridge, Warwick; it was destroyed by floods in 1795. 52°16′45″N 1°35′00″W) in the Borough of Warwick, through Southam and Daventry, to the Town of Northampton. (Repealed by Warwick and Northampton Road Act 1832 (2 & 3 Will. 4. c. xcviii))
Leicester Roads Act 1776 (repealed)	16 Geo. 3. c. 81	13 May 1776
An Act to enlarge the Term and Powers of an Act, passed in the Twenty-seventh Year of the Reign of His late Majesty King George the Second, (Note: Leicester and Warwick Roads Act 1754(27 Geo. 2. c. 42)) intituled, "An Act for repairing and widening the Road from Leicester to Narborough, and from Leicester to Coventry, and from thence through Kenilworth to Warwick, and from thence to Halford Bridge, and from Warwick to Stratford upon Avon, and from Coventry to Martyn's Gutter, (Note: Martyn's Gutter is a stream, also known as Mardon Sich, which formed the boundary between the parishes of Stivichall and Stoneleigh. 52°22′45″N 1°30′56″W) leading towards Stoneleigh Town; and for supplying an Omission in an Act, passed in the last Session of Parliament, (Note: Leicester Roads Act 1753 (26 Geo. 2. c. 46)) for repairing the Road from Leicester to Ashby-de-la-Zouch, in the County of Leicester; so far as the same relates to the Road from Coventry, through Kenilworth to Warwick, and from the said City of Coventry to Martyn's Gutter." (Repealed by Coventry Roads Act 1817 (57 Geo. 3. c. iv))
Tadcaster to Halton Dial Road Act 1776 (repealed)	16 Geo. 3. c. 82	13 May 1776
An Act to enlarge the Term and Powers of an Act, passed in the Twenty-fourth Year of the Reign of His Majesty King George the Second, (Note: Tadcaster, etc., Roads Act 1750 (24 Geo. 2. c. 22)) so far as relates to repairing the Road from Tadcaster to Halton Dyal, in the West Riding of the County of York. (Repealed by Tadcaster and Halton Dial Road Act 1819 (59 Geo. 3. c. xciv) and Tadcaster and Halton Dial Road Act 1840 (3 & 4 Vict. c. lxxx) (Note: Incorrectly cited as "3 & 4 Vict. c. xxx" in the Chronological Table of the Statutes.))
Northumberland Roads Act 1776 (repealed)	16 Geo. 3. c. 83	2 April 1776
An Act for repairing, widening, and altering the Road, from the Termination of the present Turnpike Road, at Elsdon Highcross, near the Town of Elsdon, in the County of Northumberland, on the North-east Side of the River Reed, through Overacres, Elishaw, and Catcleugh, to the Red Swyre, upon the Mid Border betwixt England and Scotland. (Repealed by Elsdon and Red Swyre Road Act 1821 (1 & 2 Geo. 4. c. xciii) and Annual Turnpike Acts Continuance Act 1880 (43 & 44 Vict. c. 12))

=== Private acts ===
Short title	Citation	Royal assent
Long title
Naturalization of Frederick Molling and George Bindheisen Act 1776	16 Geo. 3. c. 1 Pr.	20 November 1775
An Act for naturalizing Frederick Moiling and John George Bindheisen.
Balemann's Naturalization Act 1776	16 Geo. 3. c. 2 Pr.	20 November 1775
An Act for naturalizing Peter Henry Balemann.
Oaths of Office of Robert Craggs Viscount Clare and Wellbore Ellis Act 1776	16 Geo. 3. c. 3 Pr.	4 December 1775
An Act to enable the Right Honourable Robert Craggs Lord Viscounts Clare, and the Right Honourable Wellbore Ellis, to take, in Great Britain, the Oath of Office as Vice Treasurer, and Receiver General, and Paymaster General, of all His Majesty’s Revenues in the Kingdom of Ireland, and to qualify themselves for the Enjoyment of the said Offices.
Fushs' Naturalization Act 1776	16 Geo. 3. c. 4 Pr.	4 December 1775
An Act for naturalizing John Martin Fushs.
Rougemont's Naturalization Act 1776	16 Geo. 3. c. 5 Pr.	4 December 1775
An Act for naturalizing Francis Anthony Rougemont.
Broeke's Naturalization Act 1776	16 Geo. 3. c. 6 Pr.	4 December 1775
An Act for naturalizing Anthony Ten Broeke.
Bonsall, Wirksworth and Matlock (Derbyshire) Inclosure Act 1776	16 Geo. 3. c. 7 Pr.	22 December 1775
An Act for dividing and enclosing certain Commons or Pieces of Walle Ground, in the Parishes of Bonsall, Wirksworth, and Matlock, in the County of Derby.
Naturalization of Nis Nissen and Christopher Marwaede Act 1776	16 Geo. 3. c. 8 Pr.	22 December 1775
An Act for naturalizing Niss Nissen, and Christopher Gabriel Marwade.
Naturalization of John Paul and Claes Grill Act 1776	16 Geo. 3. c. 9 Pr.	22 December 1775
An Act for naturalizing John William Paul and Claes Grill.
Quist's Naturalization Act 1776	16 Geo. 3. c. 10 Pr.	22 December 1775
An Act for naturalizing Charles Quist.
Bowes' Estate Act 1776	16 Geo. 3. c. 11 Pr.	25 March 1776
An Act for vesting certain Messuages, Lands, and Hereditaments, in the several Counties of Durham, Middlesex, Berks, and Sussex, and in the City of London, (Part of the Freehold and Copyhold Estates devised by the Will of George Bowes Esquire, deceased), in Trustees, to be sold or exchanged; and for laying out the Money to arise thereby in the Purchase of other Messuages, Lands, Tenements, or Hereditaments, to be settled to the same Uses.
Lord Holland's Estate Act 1776	16 Geo. 3. c. 12 Pr.	25 March 1776
An Act for vesting the Advowson of the Rectory of Pewsey, in the County of Wilts, (Part of the Estate comprized in the Marriage Settlement of Stephen late Lord Holland, deceased), in Trustees, and their Heirs, in Trust, to be sold; and for laying out the Money to arise thereby in finishing and compleating a Mansion House, at Winterslow, in the same County.
Hales' Estate Act 1776	16 Geo. 3. c. 13 Pr.	25 March 1776
An Act for vesting certain Leasehold Pieces of Ground, in the Parish of Saint George Hanover Square, in the County of Middlesex, together with a capital Messuage, built on Part thereof, devised by the Will of Sir John Hales Baronet, deceased, in Trustees, in Trust, to assign the same to Henry Herbert Esquire, pursuant to an Agreement for that Purpose; and for applying the Consideration Money in such Manner as in the Act is mentioned.
Charging the prebend of Marston St Lawrence (Northamptonshire) and lands there belonging, with payment of two perpetual yearly rent-charges to Everard Buckworth and successors and for vesting the fee simple and inheritance so charged in John Blencowe and heirs.	16 Geo. 3. c. 14 Pr.	25 March 1776
An Act to subject and charge the Prebend of Marston Saint Lawrence, in the County of Northampton, and the Lands, Tenements, and Hereditaments, thereunto belonging, to and with the Payment of Two several perpetual Yearly Rent Charges to Doctor Everard Buckworth, and his Successors in the said Prebend; and for divesting the Fee-Simple and Inheritance thereof out of him and his Successors; and for vesting the same so charged in John Blencowe Esquire, his Heirs and Assigns.
Gunby and North Witham Inclosure Act 1776	16 Geo. 3. c. 15 Pr.	25 March 1776
An Act for dividing and enclosing the Open Fields, Meadow, Pasture, and other Commonable and Waste Grounds, within the Liberties of Gunby and North Witham, in the County of Lincoln.
Exchanging lands in Spaldwick with Upthrope with lands in Long Stow (Huntingdonshire).	16 Geo. 3. c. 16 Pr.	25 March 1776
An Act for exchanging certain Lands in the Parish and Liberties of Spaldwick with Upthorpe, for other Lands in the Parish of Long Stow, in the County of Huntingdon, in the Manner, and for the Purposes therein mentioned.
Asterby and Goulceby Inclosure Act 1776	16 Geo. 3. c. 17 Pr.	25 March 1776
An Act for dividing and enclosing certain Open Common Fields, Ings, Common Pastures, and other Commonable Lands, within the Townships of Asterby and Goulceby, in the County of Lincoln.
Leigh or Ley (Worcestershire) Inclosure Act 1776	16 Geo. 3. c. 18 Pr.	25 March 1776
An Act for dividing and enclosing the Open and Common Fields, and also a certain Parcel or Tract of Common and Waste Land called The Link, and other Common and Waste Land, within the Manor and Parish of Leigh, otherwise Ley, in the County of Worcester.
Duston Inclosure Act 1776 (repealed)	16 Geo. 3. c. 19 Pr.	25 March 1776
An Act for dividing and enclosing the Open and Common Fields, Meadows, Pastures, Heath, and Waste Grounds, within the Parish of Duston, in the County of Northampton. (Repealed by Northampton Act 1988 (c. xxix))
Liddington and Medbourn Inclosure Act 1776	16 Geo. 3. c. 20 Pr.	25 March 1776
An Act for dividing and enclosing certain Open and Common Fields, Common Meadows, Commonable Pastures Common Grounds, and Commonable Lands, within the Parish of Liddington, and Hamlet of Medbourn, in the said Parish of Liddington, in the County of Wilts.
Blackthorn Inclosure Act 1776	16 Geo. 3. c. 21 Pr.	25 March 1776
An Act for dividing and enclosing the Open and Common Fields, Common Pastures, Common Meadows, and Commonable Lands, within the Township, Hamlet, Precincts, or Liberties, of Blackthorn, in the Parish of Ambrosden, in the County of Oxford.
Desborough Inclosure Act 1776	16 Geo. 3. c. 22 Pr.	25 March 1776
An Act for dividing and enclosing the Open and Common Fields, in the Parish of Desborough, in the County of Northampton.
Raithby Inclosure Act 1776	16 Geo. 3. c. 23 Pr.	25 March 1776
An Act for dividing and enclosing certain Open Common Fields, Meadows, Pastures, Ings, and other Commonable Lands and Waste Grounds, within the Parish of Raithby near Spilsby, in the County of Lincoln.
Rushton Spencer Inclosure Act 1776	16 Geo. 3. c. 24 Pr.	25 March 1776
An Act for dividing and enclosing the several Commons and Waste Grounds, within the Manor of Rushton Spencer, in the Parish of Leek, in the County of Stafford.
Sutton St. Michael's or Sutton Bonington or Bonington End (Nottinghamshire) Inclosure Act 1776	16 Geo. 3. c. 25 Pr.	25 March 1776
An Act for dividing and enclosing the Open Fields, Meadows, Pastures, and Commonable Grounds, within the Township or Liberty of Sutton Saint Michaels otherwise Sutton Bonington, commonly called Bonington End, in the County of Nottingham.
Odel Inclosure Act 1776	16 Geo. 3. c. 26 Pr.	25 March 1776
An Act for dividing and enclosing the Open and Common Fields, and other Commonable Lands, Commons, and Waste Grounds, within the Parish of Odel, in the County of Bedford.
Warmington Inclosure Act 1776	16 Geo. 3. c. 27 Pr.	25 March 1776
An Act for dividing and enclosing the Open and Common Field, and other Commonable Lands and Grounds, lying within the Parish and Liberties of Warmington, in the County of Warwick.
Boreham Wood Common Inclosure Act 1776	16 Geo. 3. c. 28 Pr.	25 March 1776
An Act for dividing and enclosing the Common or Waste Ground, called Boreham Wood Common, in the Parish of Elstree otherwise Idlestree, in the County of Hertford.
Beckingham Inclosure Act 1776	16 Geo. 3. c. 29 Pr.	25 March 1776
An Act for dividing and enclosing the Open Fields, Meadows, Commons, and Waste Grounds, in the Parish of Beckingham, in the County of Nottingham.
Enabling George Hobart to inclose lands in Nocton (Lincolnshire) and vesting in him glebe lands, tithes and rights of common belonging to parish vicarage and compensating the vicar in lieu thereof.	16 Geo. 3. c. 30 Pr.	25 March 1776
An Act for enabling the Honourable George Hobart to enclose the Heath Lands, Field Lands, and Low Commons or Fen Grounds, in the Parish of Nocton, in the County of Lincoln; and for vesting the Glebe Lands, Vicarial Tithes, and Right of Common, belonging to the Vicarage of Nocton aforesaid, in the said George Hobart; and for making a Compensation to the Vicar of the said Parish in Lieu thereof.
Upton Inclosure Act 1776	16 Geo. 3. c. 31 Pr.	25 March 1776
An Act for dividing and enclosing the Open Fields, Meadows, Commons, and Waste Grounds, in the Parish of Upton, in the County of Lincoln.
Lea in Ashover, Crich and Southwinfield (Derbyshire) Inclosure Act 1776	16 Geo. 3. c. 32 Pr.	25 March 1776
An Act for dividing and enclosing the several Commons and Waste Grounds within the Manor of Lea, in the Parishes of Ashover, Crich and Southwinfield, in the County of Derby.
Kingswinford Inclosure Act 1776	16 Geo. 3. c. 33 Pr.	25 March 1776
An Act for dividing, allotting, and enclosing, certain Commons and Waste Lands called Ashwood Hay and Wall Heath, and several other Parcels of Waste Lands and Commonable Places, Part and Parcel of Ashwood Hay, situate within the Manor and Parish of Kingswinford, in the County of Stafford.
Extinguishing rights of soil and common upon lands in Clewer (Berkshire) and for vesting it in the Duke of Gloucester.	16 Geo. 3. c. 34 Pr.	25 March 1776
An Act for extinguishing the Right of Soil and Right of Common upon certain Pieces or Parcels of Common or Waste Land, in the Manor and Parish of Clewer, in the County of Berks; and for vesting the same in His Royal Highness the Duke of Gloucester, his Heirs and Assigns, upon the Conditions therein mentioned.
Dorsington Inclosure Act 1776	16 Geo. 3. c. 35 Pr.	25 March 1776
An Act for dividing and enclosing the Open and Common Fields, Common Meadows, Pastures, and Commonable and Waste Lands, within the Manor and Parish of Dorsington, in the County of Gloucester.
Little Harwood Inclosure Act 1776	16 Geo. 3. c. 36 Pr.	25 March 1776
An Act for dividing and enclosing the Commons or Waste Grounds within the Vill, Hamlet, or Township, of Little Harwood, in the Parish of Blackburn, and County of Lancaster.
Alkerton Inclosure Act 1776	16 Geo. 3. c. 37 Pr.	25 March 1776
An Act for dividing and enclosing the Open and Common Field, and other Commonable Lands and Grounds, lying within the Parish and Liberties of Alkerton, in the County of Oxford.
Moore's Name Act 1776	16 Geo. 3. c. 38 Pr.	25 March 1776
An Act to enable Francis Ferrand Moore Esquire, now called Francis Ferrand Foljambe, and his Heirs Male, to take and use the Surname and Arms of Foljambe, pursuant to the Wills of Francis Foljambe and Thomas Foljambe, Esquires, deceased.
Cockayne's Name Act 1776	16 Geo. 3. c. 39 Pr.	25 March 1776
An Act to enable Edward John Andrews Cockayne, and his Issue, to take and, use the Surname and Arms of Frith only, pursuant to the Will of Neighbour Frith, Esquire, deceased.
Naturalization of Charles Wolff and John Hecker Act 1776	16 Geo. 3. c. 40 Pr.	25 March 1776
An Act for naturalizing Charles Godfrey Wolff and John Adam Hecker.
Liardet's Naturalization Act 1776	16 Geo. 3. c. 41 Pr.	25 March 1776
An Act for naturalizing John Liardet.
Bastide's Naturalization Act 1776	16 Geo. 3. c. 42 Pr.	25 March 1776
An Act for naturalizing Lewis Vialetes Bastide.
Hoffman's Naturalization Act 1776	16 Geo. 3. c. 43 Pr.	25 March 1776
An Act for naturalizing John Hoffman.
Ibbetson's Estate Act 1776	16 Geo. 3. c. 44 Pr.	2 April 1776
An Act for vesting several detached Parts of the Settled Estates of Sir James Ibbetson Baronet, in Trustees, to be sold; and for the Application of the Money to arise by such Sale; and other Purposes therein mentioned.
Empowering Richard Hoare, the surviving trustee of Mary Arnold's will, to sell certain copyhold messuages or tenements with appurtenances and chattels in Hampstead (Middlesex) vested in him by said will and upon certain trusts and to purchase and settle other lands with sale proceeds.	16 Geo. 3. c. 45 Pr.	2 April 1776
An Act for empowering Richard Hoare Es quire, the surviving Trustee named in the Will of Mary Arnold, his Heirs, Executors, Administrators, or Assigns, to make Sale of a certain Copyhold Messuage, or Tenement, at Hampstead, in the County of Middlesex, with the Appurtenances, and the Household Goods and Furniture thereunto belonging, vested in him by the said Will, upon certain Trusts therein expressed; and to invest the Money to arise by such Sale in the Purchase of Lands or Tenements, to be settled in like Manner.
Hartwell and Stone Inclosure Act 1776	16 Geo. 3. c. 46 Pr.	2 April 1776
An Act for dividing and enclosing the Open and Common Fields, in the Parishes and Liberties of Hartwell and Stone, in the County of Bucks.
Ascertaining the landed property of the dean and chapter of Worcester cathedral and others from Charlton in Cropthorne (Worcestershire) and inclosing lands there.	16 Geo. 3. c. 47 Pr.	2 April 1776
An Act for ascertaining the Landed Property, as well of the Reverend the Dean and Chapter of the Cathedral Church of Christ and the Blessed Mary the Virgin at Worcester, as of others situate in the Hamlet of Charlton, in the Parish of Cropthorn, in the County of Worcester; and for dividing and enclosing the Open and Common Fields, and other Commonable Land, within the same Hamlet.
Barton and Martcleeve Inclosure Act 1776	16 Geo. 3. c. 48 Pr.	2 April 1776
An Act for dividing and enclosing the Open and Common Fields, and other Commonable Lands, in the Hamlets of Barton and Martcleeve, in the Parish of Bidford, and County of Warwick.
Great and Little Hampton Inclosure Act 1776	16 Geo. 3. c. 49 Pr.	2 April 1776
An Act for dividing and enclosing the Open and Common Fields, and all other Commonable Land, within the Parish of Great and Little Hampton, in the County of Worcester.
North or Ferry Hinksey (Berkshire) Inclosure Act 1776	16 Geo. 3. c. 50 Pr.	2 April 1776
An Act for dividing, allotting, and enclosing, the Common Fields, Common Meadows, and other Commonable Lands, in the Manor and Parish of North Hinksey, otherwise Ferry Hinksey, in the County of Berks.
Brougham Inclosure Act 1776	16 Geo. 3. c. 51 Pr.	2 April 1776
An Act for dividing and enclosing a certain Common and Waste Grounds, within the Parish of Brougham, in the County of Westmorland.
Bruntingthorpe Inclosure Act 1776	16 Geo. 3. c. 52 Pr.	2 April 1776
An Act for dividing and enclosing the Open and Common Fields, and Commonable Grounds, within the Parish of Bruntingthorp, in the County of Leicester.
Nettleham Inclosure Act 1776	16 Geo. 3. c. 53 Pr.	2 April 1776
An Act for dividing, apportioning, and enclosing, the Open and Common Fields, Commonable Lands, and Waste Grounds, within the Manor and Parish of Nettleham, in the County of Lincoln.
Owen's Estate Act 1776	16 Geo. 3. c. 54 Pr.	13 May 1776
An Act for vesting Part of the Estates devised by the Will of Sarah Owen Spinster, deceased, in the Counties of Salop and Montgomery, in Trustees, to be sold; and for laying out the Money arising by such Sale in the Purchase of other Messuages, Lands, and Hereditaments, to be settled in lieu thereof to the like Uses.
Wrigglesworth's Estate Act 1776	16 Geo. 3. c. 55 Pr.	13 May 1776
An Act for discharging Part of the Estate of Nicholas Wrigglesworth and Ayscoghe Wrigglesworth his eldest Son, from the Payment of a Yearly Sum of Thirty-five Pounds, given by Sir Edward Barkham, long since deceased, to charitable Uses, and of and from other Incumbrances; and for charging the same respectively upon a competent Part of the Estates of the said Nicholas Wrigglesworth and his Son; and for vesting the Residue thereof in Trustees, to be sold, for the Payment of Debts, and other the Purposes therein mentioned.
Hinde's Estate Act 1776	16 Geo. 3. c. 56 Pr.	13 May 1776
An Act for setting certain Messuages, Lands, and Hereditaments, in the Parishes of Saint Mary-le-Bone and Saint Paneras, or One of them, in the County of Middlesex, to the Uses agreed to be thereof limited, in the Settlement made on the Marriage of Jacob Hinde Esquire, with Anne Thayer, now Anne Hinde, his Wife, with Power to make such Leases thereof as in the said Act are mentioned.
Rudge's Estate Act 1776	16 Geo. 3. c. 57 Pr.	13 May 1776
An Act for vesting a Leasehold Messuage in Grosvenor Square, in the Parish of Saint George Hanover Square, in the County of Middlesex, bequeathed by the Will of Edward Rudge Esquire, deceased, in Trustees, to be sold; and other the Purposes therein mentioned.
Clayton's Estate Act 1776	16 Geo. 3. c. 58 Pr.	13 May 1776
An Act to enable William Clayton Esquire, during his Life, and the Guardians of his infant Children After his Decease, to make building and improving Leases of certain Lands and Premises, Part of the Manor of Kennington, in the County of Surrey, held by Letters Patent from His Majesty as Part of the Duchy of Cornwall; and to raise Money for Payment of the Fines and Expences of renewing the said Letters Patent; and for defraying the Expences to attend the granting such building and improving Leases.
Newnham's Estate Act 1776	16 Geo. 3. c. 59 Pr.	13 May 1776
An Act for vesting Part of the Settled Estates of John Newnham Esquire, in the Counties of Huntingdon, Middlesex, and Sussex, and in the Cities of London and Canterbury, in Trustees, to be sold; and for purchasing other Estates in lieu thereof, to be settled to the same Uses.
Eyre's Estate Act 1776	16 Geo. 3. c. 60 Pr.	13 May 1776
An Act to discharge certain Lands, heretofore Part of the Estate and Inheritance of Thomas Eyre Esquire, deceased, situate within the Lordship of High Peak, in the County of Derby, from the Payment of a certain Fee Farm Rent of On hundred Pounds a Year; and for securing the same on other Parts of the said Estate.
Sterne's Estate Act 1776	16 Geo. 3. c. 61 Pr.	13 May 1776
An Act for enabling the Trustees named in the Will of William Sterne, deceased, to sell and convey a Leasehold Estate, veiled in them by the said Will, upon certain Trusts therein mentioned, to George Hodgkinson Esquire, pursuant to Articles; and to lay out the Money arising by such Sale in the Purchase of other Lands or Hereditaments, to be settled to the like Uses.
Sykes' Estate Act 1776	16 Geo. 3. c. 62 Pr.	13 May 1776
An Act for enabling Christopher Sykes Esquire, to raise Money by way of Charge or Mortgage upon divers Lands and Grounds, in the Parish of Sledmere, in the County of York, Part of the Settled Estates of the said Christopher Sykes, on the Improvement intended to be made by him thereof; and for limiting a Rent Charge thereout to Elizabeth Sykes his Wife, in lieu of her Life Estate in Part of the same Lands and Grounds; and for other Purposes therein mentioned.
Stonegrave, Westness and Nunnington (Yorkshire, North Riding) inclosures.	16 Geo. 3. c. 63 Pr.	13 May 1776
An Act for dividing, allotting, and enclosing the Open undivided Common Fields and Common Pastures, within the several Townships of Stonegrave, Westness, and Nunnington, in the North Riding of the County of York.
Wooller Common Inclosure Act 1776	16 Geo. 3. c. 64 Pr.	13 May 1776
An Act for dividing and enclosing a Common or Moor, called Wooller Common, in the Parish of Wooller, in the County of Northumberland.
Ickleford Inclosure Act 1776	16 Geo. 3. c. 65 Pr.	13 May 1776
An Act for dividing and enclosing the Open and Common Fields, and other Commonable Lands and Grounds, in the Parish of Ickleford, in the County of Hertford.
Stainburne Inclosure Act 1776	16 Geo. 3. c. 66 Pr.	13 May 1776
An Act for dividing, enclosing, and improving the Walle and Common Grounds, in the Township of Stainburne, in the Parish of Kirkby Overblow, in the County of York.
Sutton-upon-Derwent Inclosure Act 1776	16 Geo. 3. c. 67 Pr.	13 May 1776
An Act for dividing and enclosing the Open Arable Fields, Meadows, and Pastures, within the Township of Sutton upon Derwent, in the East Riding of the County of York.
Walgave Inclosure Act 1776	16 Geo. 3. c. 68 Pr.	13 May 1776
An Act for dividing and enclosing the Open and Common Fields, Common Pastures, Common Meadows, and other Commonable Lands and Grounds, of and within the Manor and Parish of Walgrave, in the County of Northampton.
Yelvertoft Inclosure Act 1776	16 Geo. 3. c. 69 Pr.	13 May 1776
An Act for dividing and enclosing the Open and Common Fields, Common Pastures, Common Meadows, and other Commonable Lands, of and within the Parish and Liberties of Yelvertost, in the County of Northampton.
Clipston and Newbold or Nobald (Northamptonshire) Inclosures Act 1776	16 Geo. 3. c. 70 Pr.	13 May 1776
An Act for dividing and enclosing the Open and Common Fields, Common Pastures, Common Meadows, and other Commonable Lands, within the Parish and Liberties of Clipston and Newbold, otherwise Nobald, in the County of Northampton.
Clarebrough and Welham Inclosure Act 1776	16 Geo. 3. c. 71 Pr.	13 May 1776
An Act for dividing and enclosing certain Open Fields, Meadows, Stinted Common Pastures, Free Commons, and Waste Grounds, within the Townships of Clarebrough and Welham, in the Parish of Clarebrough, in the County of Nottingham.
Great Bowden Inclosure Act 1776	16 Geo. 3. c. 72 Pr.	13 May 1776
An Act for dividing and enclosing the Open and Common Fields, Common Pastures, Common Meadows, and other Commonable Lands, within the Parish and Liberties of Great Bowden, in the County of Leicester.
Crowcombe Inclosure Act 1776	16 Geo. 3. c. 73 Pr.	13 May 1776
An Act for dividing and enclosing certain Open and uncultivated Lands and Traces of Waste Ground called Crewcombe, Heathfield, and Heddon, and Parcel of Quantock Hills, within the Parish of Crowcombe, in the County of Somerset.
Cawood and Wistow Inclosures Act 1776	16 Geo. 3. c. 74 Pr.	13 May 1776
An Act for dividing and enclosing several Open Common Fields, Woods, and Average Grounds, Ings, Marines, Carrs, Commons, and other Waste Lands and Grounds, within the several Manors and Parishes of Cawood and Wistow, in the County of York.
South and North Killingholme (Lincolnshire) Inclosure Act 1776	16 Geo. 3. c. 75 Pr.	13 May 1776
An Act for dividing and enclosing certain Open Fields, Lands, and Grounds, within the Lordships and Parish of South and North Killingholme, in the County of Lincoln.
Coney Weston Inclosure Act 1776	16 Geo. 3. c. 76 Pr.	13 May 1776
An Act for dividing, allotting, and enclosing of the Common Fields, Half-year Enclosures, Heaths, Brooms, Breaches, Commons, and Waste Lands, within the Parish of Coney Weston, in the County of Suffolk.
Ifton Inclosure Act 1776	16 Geo. 3. c. 77 Pr.	13 May 1776
An Act for dividing and enclosing the Open or Common Fields, Common Moors, Common Meadows, Common Pastures, and other Commonable Lands, within the Parish of Ifton, in the County of Monmouth.
Mulgrave in Lyth Inclosure Act 1776	16 Geo. 3. c. 78 Pr.	13 May 1776
An Act for dividing and enclosing the Common Arable Fields, Common Meadows, Common Pastures, Moors, Commons, and Waste Grounds, in the Manor of Mulgrave, within the Parish of Lyth, in the North Riding of the County of York.
Yardley Hastings Inclosure Act 1776	16 Geo. 3. c. 79 Pr.	13 May 1776
An Act for dividing, allotting, and enclosing the Open and Common Fields, Common Pastures, Common Meadows, and other Commonable Lands and Grounds, of and within the Manor and Parish of Yardley Hastings, in the County of Northampton.
Amotherby Inclosure Act 1776	16 Geo. 3. c. 80 Pr.	13 May 1776
An Act for dividing and enclosing the Common Arable Fields, Commons, and Waste Grounds, within the Manor and Township of Amotherby, in the Parish of Appleton in the Street, in the North Riding of the County of York.
Welby Inclosure Act 1776	16 Geo. 3. c. 81 Pr.	13 May 1776
An Act for dividing and enclosing the several Open and Common Fields, Common Heath, Common Pasture, and Waste Grounds, within the Manor and Parish of Welby, in the County of Lincoln.
West Horndon Inclosure Act 1776	16 Geo. 3. c. 82 Pr.	13 May 1776
An Act for dividing, allotting, and enclosing a certain Common or un-enclosed Piece or Parcel of Commonable Land or Ground, within the Manor or Parish of West Horndon, in the County of Essex.
Screveton Inclosure Act 1776	16 Geo. 3. c. 83 Pr.	13 May 1776
An Act to confirm and establish the Division and Enclosure of an Open Arable Field, in the Parish of Screveton, in the County of Nottingham; and also several Exchanges of Lands within the said Parish.
Elliot's Divorce Act 1776	16 Geo. 3. c. 84 Pr.	13 May 1776
An Act to dissolve the Marriage of John Eliot Doctor in Physick, with Grace Dalrymple his now Wife, and to enable him to marry again; and for other Purposes therein mentioned.
Herneck's Divorce Act 1776	16 Geo. 3. c. 85 Pr.	13 May 1776
An Act to dissolve the Marriage of Charles Horneck Esquire with Sarah Keppel his now Wife, and to enable him to marry again; and for other Purposes therein mentioned.
Williams' Divorce Act 1776	16 Geo. 3. c. 86 Pr.	13 May 1776
An Act to dissolve the Marriage of Thomas Williams with Ann Lantware his now Wife, and to enable him to marry again; and for other Purposes therein mentioned.
Medows' Name Act 1776	16 Geo. 3. c. 87 Pr.	13 May 1776
An Act to amend an Act, made and passed in the Fourteenth Year of His present Majesty’s Reign, intituled, "An Act to enable John Medows the Elder, Gentleman, and his Issue Male, to take the Surname and Arms of Theobald, pursuant to the Will of Elizabeth Theobald Widow, deceased;" (Note: Medows' Name Act 1774 (14 Geo. 3. c. 84 Pr.)) and also to enable John Medows, eldest Son of the said John Medows (now John Theobald), and the Heirs of his Body, to take the said Surname, and bear the said Arms of Theobald.
Zinck's Naturalization Act 1776	16 Geo. 3. c. 88 Pr.	13 May 1776
An Act for naturalizing Henry Lawrence Zinck.
De Morsier's Naturalization Act 1776	16 Geo. 3. c. 89 Pr.	13 May 1776
An Act for naturalizing John Alexander De Morsier.
Englebert Mulhausen's Naturalization Act 1776	16 Geo. 3. c. 90 Pr.	13 May 1776
An Act for naturalizing Engelbert Mulhausen.
Chevalier's Naturalization Act 1776	16 Geo. 3. c. 91 Pr.	13 May 1776
An Act for naturalizing Marie Magdelaine Chevalier.
Duke of Ancaster and Kesteven's Estate Act 1776	16 Geo. 3. c. 92 Pr.	21 May 1776
An Act for vesting in Trustees, the Settled Estate of the Most Noble Peregrine Duke of Ancaster and Kesteven, in the County of York, to discharge Incumbrances affecting the same, and other Part of the said Settled Estates; and for purchasing of Estates to be settled to the several Uses therein mentioned.
Vesting the school house, masters dwelling house and close in Courtenhall (Northamptonshire) in Sir William Wake.	16 Geo. 3. c. 93 Pr.	21 May 1776
An Act for vesting the Free School House, Dwelling House for the Master and Usther, Close, and other Premises thereto belonging, in Courtenhall, in the County of Northampton, in Sir William Wake Baronet, and his Heirs, upon the Conditions therein mentioned.
Whitworth's Estate Act 1776	16 Geo. 3. c. 94 Pr.	21 May 1776
An Act for the Sale of the Estates of Sir Charles Whitworth, in the County of Somerset; and for exonerating the same, and his Estates in the County of Kent, from the Portions of his younger Children, provided by his Marriage Settlement.
Nuthall's Estate Act 1776	16 Geo. 3. c. 95 Pr.	21 May 1776
An Act to enable William Masterman and Thomas Francis, Esquires, to make a Title to certain Leasehold and Copyhold Estates of Thomas Nuthall Esquire, deceased.
Leigh's Estate Act 1776	16 Geo. 3. c. 96 Pr.	21 May 1776
An Act for Sale of Part of the Estates late of John Leigh Esquire, deceased, for Payment of Mortgages, and other Debts, to which the said Estates are liable; and for other Purposes therein mentioned.
Dolman's Estate Act 1776	16 Geo. 3. c. 97 Pr.	21 May 1776
An Act for vesting the Settled Estates of Robert Dolman Esquire, and Robert Dolman the Younger, in Pocklington, and elsewhere, in the County of York, in Trustees, to be sold; and for laying out the Money arising by such Sale in the Purchase of other Lands and Hereditaments, to be settled in lieu thereof, to the same Uses.
Onslow's Estate Act 1776	16 Geo. 3. c. 98 Pr.	21 May 1776
An Act for vesting an Estate, in the County of Middlesex, which was settled by Richard Onslow Esquire, deceased, on his Marriage with Poolley Walton, in Trustees, in order that the same may be conveyed to Matthew Winter, and his Heirs, pursuant to an Agreement made by him for the Purchase thereof; and for investing the Purchase Money in Three per Centum Consolidated Bank Annuities; and for other Purposes therein mentioned.
Dashwood's Estate Act 1776	16 Geo. 3. c. 99 Pr.	21 May 1776
An Act for confirming the Settlements made by Charles Vere Dashwood Esquire, in Satisfaction of certain Articles entered into by him previous to his Marriage, and during his Infancy; and for other Purposes therein mentioned.
Upfold's Estate Act 1776	16 Geo. 3. c. 100 Pr.	21 May 1776
An Act for vesting the Settled Estates of William Upfold Gentleman, in the County of Middlesex, and City of London, in Trustees, to be sold; and for purchasing other Lands and Hereditaments, to be settled to the same Uses.
Mason's Estate Act 1776	16 Geo. 3. c. 101 Pr.	21 May 1776
An Act for vesting Two Sixth Parts of the Estates late of Stanhope Mason Gentleman, deceased, in England and Ireland, in Trustees, to be sold; and for purchasing other Estates to be settled in lieu thereof.
Shepheard's Estate Act 1776	16 Geo. 3. c. 102 Pr.	21 May 1776
An Act for vesting several Estates, late of Samuel Shephcard, of Exning, in the County of Suffolk, Esquire, deceased, in Trustees, to be sold; and for purchasing other Estates to be conveyed to the like Uses; and for other Purposes therein mentioned.
Chipping Lamborne Inclosure Act 1776	16 Geo. 3. c. 103 Pr.	21 May 1776
An Act for dividing and allotting certain Open and Common Fields, Downs, and Commonable Grounds, in the Tythings or Liberties of Eastbury, otherwise Isbury, and Blagrove, in the Parish of Chipping Lamborne, in the County of Berks.
Crick Inclosure Act 1776	16 Geo. 3. c. 104 Pr.	21 May 1776
An Act for dividing and enclosing the Open and Common Fields, Common Pastures, Common Meadows, and other Commonable Lands, of and within the Parish and Liberties of Crick, in the County of Northampton.
Weedon Beck Inclosure Act 1776	16 Geo. 3. c. 105 Pr.	21 May 1776
An Act for dividing and enclosing the Open and Common Fields, Common Pastures, Common Meadows, and other Commonable Lands and Grounds, of and in Over Weedon Beck, and Nether Weedon Beck, within the Parish and Liberties of Weedon Beck, in the County of Northampton.
Corbridge Inclosure Act 1776	16 Geo. 3. c. 106 Pr.	21 May 1776
An Act for dividing and enclosing certain Open Common Fields, Stinted Pastures, and Common Moors or Waste Grounds, within the Manor and Parish of Corbridge, in the County of Northumberland.
Foston Inclosure Act 1776	16 Geo. 3. c. 107 Pr.	21 May 1776
An Act for dividing and enclosing the Open Arable Fields, Meadows, Pastures, Carrs, and other Open Lands and Grounds, within the Township of Boston, in the East Riding of the County of York.
Bilton Inclosure Act 1776	16 Geo. 3. c. 108 Pr.	21 May 1776
An Act for dividing and enclosing the several Open Fields, Common Pastures, Common and other Waste Lands and Grounds, within the Township of Bilton, in the County of the City of York.
Bunbury's Divorce Act 1776	16 Geo. 3. c. 109 Pr.	21 May 1776
An Act to dissolve the Marriage of Sir Thomas Charles Bunbury Baronet, with the Right Honourable Lady Sarah Lenox his now Wife, and to enable him to marry again; and for other Purposes therein mentioned.
Duke of St. Albans' Estate Act 1776	16 Geo. 3. c. 110 Pr.	23 May 1776
An Act for re-vesting Part of the Real and Personal Estates of the Most Noble George Duke of Saint Albans in him; and for other Purposes therein mentioned.
Lord Montfort's Estate Act 1776	16 Geo. 3. c. 111 Pr.	23 May 1776
An Act for vesting the Real Estates comprized in the Marriage Settlement of Thomas Lord Montfort, situate in the Counties of Cambridge and Suffolk, and the Woods, Underwoods, Timber, and other Trees glowing and being thereon, in Trustees, and their Heirs, in Trust, to be sold and disposed of in Manner therein mentioned; and for applying the Monies to arise by Sale thereof in the Manner therein also mentioned.
Abdy's Estate Act 1776	16 Geo. 3. c. 112 Pr.	23 May 1776
An Act for the Sale of a Leasehold Estate, late belonging to Sir John Abdy Baronet, deceased, at Bishop's Canning, in the County of Wilts, and of Timber Trees growing on his Estates in the County of Essex, and also of his Medals and Coins, for paying off and discharging certain Incumbrances affecting his Real Estates in Essex; and for laying out the Residue of the Monies arising by such Sale in the Purchase of Lands, to be settled to the same Uses as his Estates in Essex now stand settled by his Will.
Estcourt's Estate Act 1776	16 Geo. 3. c. 113 Pr.	23 May 1776
An Act for applying the Money to arise by Sale of certain Messuages situate in Cheapside, in the City of London, devised by the Will of Edmund Estcourt Esquire, deceased, to Trustees, to be sold, in the building a Mansion House upon the Settled Estates, late of the said Edmund Estcourt, at Shipton Moyne and Dovel, in the County- of Gloucester, together with the Materials of the antient Mansion House now standing thereon.
Heywood's Estate Act 1776	16 Geo. 3. c. 114 Pr.	23 May 1776
An Act for vesting the Settled Estates of Peter John Heywood Esquire, in the Isle of Man, called The Nunnery, in Trustees, to be sold; and for laying out the Money arising by such Sale in the Purchase of Lands and Hereditaments, in that Part of Great Britain called England, to be settled in lieu of the said Estates in the Isle of Man, intended to be sold.
Bentinck's Estate Act 1776	16 Geo. 3. c. 115 Pr.	23 May 1776
An Act for vesting certain Manors, Messuages, Lands, and Hereditaments, in the several Counties of Middlesex, Surrey, Southampton, and Norfolk, the Freehold, Copyhold, and Leasehold Estates, late of John Albert Bentinck Esquire, deceased, in Trustees, in Trust, to sell, mortgage or exchange, any Part or Parts thereof; and for applying the Money to arise thereby in discharging Incumbrances, and making Buildings and Improvements on the said Estates, and in completing Purchases of Lands agreed for by the said John Albert Bentinck, and for other Purposes; and for laying out the Residue of such Money in the Purchase of other Manors, Lands, or Hereditaments, to be settled to the same Uses as are now subsisting concerning the same.
Stapilton's Estate Act 1776	16 Geo. 3. c. 116 Pr.	23 May 1776
An Act for vesting Part of the Settled Estates of Henry Stapilton Esquire, at Wighill, in the County of the City of York, in the said Henry Stapilton, in Fee-Simple; and for settling in lieu thereof other Lands and Hereditaments of the said Henry Stapilton, lying contiguous to, and interspersed with, the Remainder of the said Settled Estates, and also the Tithes thereof, and of such Remainder, to the same Uses.
Morice's Estate Act 1776	16 Geo. 3. c. 117 Pr.	23 May 1776
An Act to enable certain Persons, during the successive Minorities of Sir William Molesworth Baronet, and his Brothers, to grant Leases of the Estates devised to them by the Will of Sir William Morice Baronet, deceased.
Smith's Estate Act 1776	16 Geo. 3. c. 118 Pr.	23 May 1776
An Act for vesting certain Estates in the Counties of Wilts and Somerset, late belonging to John Smith Esquire, deceased, in Trustees, to be sold for Payment of his Debts; and for other Purposes therein mentioned.
Setting and securing lands and barony of Corsemichael called Greenlaw in Kirkcudbright to Isabel Gordan for her life and in favour of her eldest son Alexander Gordon and same series of heirs in fee tail and under conditions and limitations contained in a deed of entail dated 1742 by John Maccullock and Jean Gordan. Also for vesting in said Alexander an estate in Culvennam in Wigton in fee simple and £1,971.	16 Geo. 3. c. 119 Pr.	23 May 1776
An Act for settling and securing certain Parts of the Lands and Barony of Corsemichael called Greenlaw, and others lying in the Stewartry of Kircudbright, to and in favour of Isabel Gordon of Culvennan, Widow of William Gordon of Greenlaw, Esquire, for her Life, and to and in favour of Alexander Gordon of Culvennan Esquire, her eldest Son, and the same Series of Heirs, in Fee Tail, and under the same Conditions and Limitations as are mentioned and contained in a Deed of Entail, made in the Year One thousand seven hundred and forty-two, by John Macclloch of Barholm; and Jean Gordon his Wise; and for vesting in the aforesaid Alexander Gordon, and his Heirs and Assigns, in Fee-Simple, the Estate of Culvennan, and others lying in the County of Wigton, together with the Sum Of One thousand nine hundred and seventy-one Pounds Sterling.
Whitfield's Estate Act 1776	16 Geo. 3. c. 120 Pr.	23 May 1776
An Act to enable John Whitfeld Esquire to charge Part of his Settled Estates, in the County of Northampton, in the Manner therein mentioned.
Enabling Hetherop (Gloucestershire) parish rector to exchange part of his glebe lands for some more conveniently situated in the adjoining parish of Williamstrip, belonging to Samuel Blackwell.	16 Geo. 3. c. 121 Pr.	23 May 1776
An Act to enable the Rector of the Parish Church of Hatherop, in the County of Gloucester, to exchange Part of his Glebe Lands there, for other Lands more conveniently situated, the Property of Samuel Blackwell Esquire, in the Hamlet of Williamstrip, adjoining to the said Parish of Hatherop.
Jenkins' Divorce Act 1776	16 Geo. 3. c. 122 Pr.	23 May 1776
An Act to dissolve the Marriage of the Reverend John Jenkins Clerk, with Mary Jenkins his now Wife, and to enable him to marry again; and for other Purposes therein mentioned.

=== Sources ===
- Pickering, Danby, ed. (1775). "16 George III - 1775-6". The Statutes at Large. Vol. 31. Cambridge: Charles Bathurst. pp. 133–294 – via Google Books.
- Journals of the House of Commons. Vol. 35. London: His Majesty's Stationery Office. 1803. pp. 397–811 – via Google Books.
- Chronological Table of and Index to the Statutes. Vol. 1: To the End of the Session 59 Vict. Sess. 2 (1895) (13th ed.). London: Her Majesty's Stationery Office. 1896. pp. 132–133 – via Google Books.

== 17 Geo. 3 ==
The third session of the 14th Parliament of Great Britain, which met from 31 October 1776 until 6 June 1777.

This session was also traditionally cited as 17 G. 3.

=== Public acts ===
Short title	Citation	Royal assent
Long title
Land Tax (No. 3) Act 1776 (repealed)	17 Geo. 3. c. 1	20 November 1776
An Act for granting an Aid to His Majesty by a Land Tax, to be raised in Great Britain, for the Service of the Year One thousand seven hundred and seventy-seven. (Repealed by Statute Law Revision Act 1871 (34 & 35 Vict. c. 116))
Malt Duties Act (No. 2) 1776 (repealed)	17 Geo. 3. c. 2	2 December 1776
An Act for continuing and granting to His Majesty certain Duties upon Malt, Mum, Cyder, and Perry, for the Service of the Year One thousand seven hundred and seventy-seven. (Repealed by Statute Law Revision Act 1871 (34 & 35 Vict. c. 116))
Mutiny (No. 2) Act 1776 (repealed)	17 Geo. 3. c. 3	2 December 1776
An Act for punishing Mutiny and Desertion; and for the better Payment of the Army and their Quarters. (Repealed by Statute Law Revision Act 1871 (34 & 35 Vict. c. 116))
Marine Mutiny (No. 2) Act 1776 (repealed)	17 Geo. 3. c. 4	2 December 1776
An Act for the Regulation of His Majesty's Marine Forces while on Shore. (Repealed by Statute Law Revision Act 1871 (34 & 35 Vict. c. 116))
Islington (Poor Relief, etc.) Act 1776 (repealed)	17 Geo. 3. c. 5	3 March 1777
An Act for the better Relief and Employment of the Poor of the Parish of Saint Mary, Islington, in the County of Middlesex; and for building a Workhouse for the said Parish. (Repealed by St. Mary Islington Poor Relief and Workhouse Act 1813 (53 Geo. 3. c. xxi) and St. Mary Islington Improvement Act 1824 (5 Geo. 4. c. cxxv))
Hartley's Patent (Fire Prevention) Act 1776 (repealed)	17 Geo. 3. c. 6	3 March 1777
An Act for vesting in David Hartley Esquire, his Executors, Administrators and Assigns, the sole Use and Property of a certain Method, by him invented, of securing Buildings against the Calamities of Fire, throughout His Majesty's Dominions, for a limited Time. (Repealed by Statute Law Revision Act 1948 (11 & 12 Geo. 6. c. 62))
Privateers Act 1776 (repealed)	17 Geo. 3. c. 7	3 March 1777
An Act for enabling the Commissioners for executing the Office of Lord High Admiral of Great Britain, to grant Commissions to the Commanders of Private Ships and Vessels employed in Trade, or retained in His Majesty's Service, to take and make Prize of all such Ships and Vessels, and their Cargoes, as are therein mentioned, for a limited Time. (Repealed by Statute Law Revision Act 1861 (24 & 25 Vict. c. 101))
East India Company Act 1776 (repealed)	17 Geo. 3. c. 8	3 March 1777
An Act to amend so much of an Act, made in the Thirteenth Year of the Reign of His present Majesty, intituled, "An Act for establishing certain Regulations for the better Management of the Affairs of the East India Company, as well in India, as in Europe," (Note: East India Company Act 1772 (13 Geo. 3. c. 63)) as relates to the Day on which the annual Election of Directors of the said Company is to be made. (Repealed by Statute Law Revision Act 1861 (24 & 25 Vict. c. 101))
Habeas Corpus Suspension Act 1776 or the Habeas Corpus Suspension Act 1777 or the Treason Act 1777 (repealed)	17 Geo. 3. c. 9	3 March 1777
An Act to empower His Majesty to secure and detain Persons charged with or suspected of the Crime of High Treason committed in any of His Majesty's Colonies or Plantations in America, or on the High Seas, or the Crime of Piracy. (Repealed by Statute Law Revision Act 1871 (34 & 35 Vict. c. 116))
Militia Pay (No. 2) Act 1776 (repealed)	17 Geo. 3. c. 10	3 March 1777
An Act for defraying the Charge of the Pay and Cloathing of the Militia, in that Part of Great Britain called England, for One Year, beginning the Twenty-fifth Day of March One thousand seven hundred and seventy-seven. (Repealed by Statute Law Revision Act 1871 (34 & 35 Vict. c. 116))
Worsted Act 1776 (repealed)	17 Geo. 3. c. 11	27 March 1777
An Act for more effectually preventing Frauds and Abuses committed by Persons employed in the Manufactures of Combing Wool, Worsted, Yarn, and Goods made from Worsted, in the Counties of York, Lancaster, and Chester. (Repealed by Statute Law (Repeals) Act 1986 (c. 12))
Coalport Bridge over Severn (Tolls, etc.) Act 1776 (repealed)	17 Geo. 3. c. 12	27 March 1777
An Act for building a Bridge across the River Severn, from or near a Place called Preen's Eddy, in the Parish of Broseley, to or near a Place called The Sheepwash, in the Parish of Sutton Maddock, in the County of Salop; and for making proper Roads and Avenues to and from the same. (Repealed by Statute Law Revision Act 1950 (14 Geo. 6. c. 6))
Coal Measurement, London Act 1776 (repealed)	17 Geo. 3. c. 13	27 March 1777
An Act for continuing, for a limited Time, an Act made in the Seventh Year of the Reign of His present Majesty, (Note: Coal Metage, etc., London Act 1766 (7 Geo. 3. c. 23)) to prevent Frauds and Abuses in the Admeasurement of Coals sold by Wharf Measure, within the City of London and the Liberties thereof, and between Tower-Dock and Limehouse-Hole, in the County of Middlesex. (Repealed by Statute Law (Repeals) Act 1976 (c. 16))
Chester Theatre Act 1776 (repealed)	17 Geo. 3. c. 14	27 March 1777
An Act to enable His Majesty to license a Theatre in the City of Chester. (Repealed by Statute Law Revision Act 1948 (11 & 12 Geo. 6. c. 62))
Yorkshire (Small Debts) Act 1776 (repealed)	17 Geo. 3. c. 15	27 March 1777
An Act for the more easy and speedy Recovery of small Debts within the Parishes of Halifax, Bradford, Kighley, Bingley, Guiseley, Calverley, Batley, Birstal, Mirfield, Hartishead cum Clifton, Almondbury, Kirkheaton, Kirkburton, and Huddersfield, and the Lordship or Liberty of Tong, in the West Riding of the County of York; and for extending the Jurisdiction of the Courts Baron of the Honour of Pontefract, Manor of Wakefield, and Manor of Bingley, in the said County. (Repealed by West Riding (Small Debts) Act 1780 (20 Geo. 3. c. 65))
Turnpike Roads (No. 3) Act 1776 (repealed)	17 Geo. 3. c. 16	27 March 1777
An Act for limiting the Exemptions from Toll (granted by any Act or Acts of Parliament for repairing Turnpike Roads), on Account of Cattle going to and from Water or Pasture. (Repealed by Turnpike Roads Act 1822 (3 Geo. 4. c. 126))
Crown Lands at Enfield, Middlesex Act 1776 (Note: This act was listed as repealed in schedule 1 of the Statute Law (Repeals) Act 1978 (c. 45), but this was rescinded by section 2 of the Statute Law (Repeals) Act 1993 (c. 50).) or the Enfield Chase Act 1777	17 Geo. 3. c. 17	27 March 1777
An Act for dividing the Chace of Enfield, in the County of Middlesex; and for other Purposes therein mentioned.
Thames Navigation Act 1776 (repealed)	17 Geo. 3. c. 18	30 April 1777
An Act for enabling the Mayor, Aldermen, and Commons of the City of London, to purchase the present Tolls and Duties payable for navigating upon the River Thames Westward of London Bridge, within the Liberties of the City of London, and for laying a small Toll in lieu thereof, for the Purpose of more effectually completing the said Navigation; and for other Purposes. (Repealed by Thames Conservancy Act 1894 (57 & 58 Vict. c. clxxxvii))
Old Swineford (Small Debts) Act 1776 (repealed)	17 Geo. 3. c. 19	27 March 1777
An Act for the more easy and speedy Recovery of small Debts, within the Parish of Old Swinford, in the Counties of Worcester and Stafford. (Repealed by County Courts Act 1846 (9 & 10 Vict. c. 95))
Burntisland Beer Duties Act 1776 (repealed)	17 Geo. 3. c. 20	27 March 1777
An Act for continuing Two Acts, made in the Sixth Year of the Reign of King George the First, (Note: Bruntisland Beer Duties Act 1719 (6 Geo. 1. c. 8)) and in the Twentieth Year of the Reign of His late Majesty, (Note: Bruntisland Beer Duties Act 1746 (20 Geo. 2. c. 26)) for laying a Duty of Two Pennies Scots, or One Sixth Part of a Penny Sterling upon every Scots Pint of Beer or Ale, vended or sold within the Town of Burntisland and Liberties thereof, for encreasing the publick Revenue of the said Town; and for other Purposes therein mentioned. (Repealed by Statute Law Revision Act 1948 (11 & 12 Geo. 6. c. 62))
Civil List Act 1776 (repealed)	17 Geo. 3. c. 21	7 May 1777
An Act for the better Support of His Majesty's Household, and of the Honour and Dignity of the Crown of Great Britain. (Repealed by Statute Law Revision Act 1871 (34 & 35 Vict. c. 116))
London (Streets) Act 1776 (repealed)	17 Geo. 3. c. 22	30 April 1777
An Act for opening Communications between Wapping Street and Ratcliff Highway, and between Old Gravel Lane and Virginia Street; and for paving certain Streets intended to be built, and also certain other Streets, and publick Passages and Places, within the Parishes of Saint George and Saint John of Wapping, in the County of Middlesex. (Repealed by London Government (Borough of Stepney) Order in Council 1901 (SR&O 1901/276))
London (Streets) (No. 2) Act 1776 (repealed)	17 Geo. 3. c. 23	30 April 1777
An Act for lighting and watching the Turnpike Road leading from the Stone's End, next Blackman Street, in the Parish of Saint Mary Newington, in the County of Surrey, to the Bridge at Walworth, in the same Parish, and the several Roads, Ways, and Places, therein described, communicating therewith. (Repealed by Statute Law (Repeals) Act 2013 (c. 2))
York Buildings Company (Sale of Scottish Estates) Act 1776 (repealed)	17 Geo. 3. c. 24	30 April 1777
An Act for expediting the Sale of the Estates in Scotland, belonging to the York Buildings Company, for the Relief of their Creditors. (Repealed by Statute Law (Repeals) Act 1978 (c. 45))
Wolverhampton (Improvements) Act 1776 (repealed)	17 Geo. 3. c. 25	16 May 1777
An Act for widening, cleansing, and lighting, the several Streets, Lanes, Alleys, Ways, and other publick Passages, within the Town of Wolverhampton, in the County of Stafford; and for taking down, altering, or re-building, certain Buildings therein mentioned, and for removing all other Nuisances and Encroachments; and for regulating Carts and other Carriages within the said Town. (Repealed by Wolverhampton Improvement and Markets Act 1814 (c. 54 Geo. 3. c. cvi))
Grants of Life Annuities Act 1776 (repealed)	17 Geo. 3. c. 26	16 May 1777
An Act for registering the Grants of Life Annuities; and for the better Protection of Infants against such Grants. (Repealed by Statute Law Revision Act 1861 (24 & 25 Vict. c. 101))
Customs (No. 4) Act 1776 (repealed)	17 Geo. 3. c. 27	16 May 1777
An Act for allowing a Drawback of the Duties of Customs on the Exportation of Tea to Ireland. (Repealed by Statute Law Revision Act 1861 (24 & 25 Vict. c. 101))
Exportation (No. 2) Act 1776 (repealed)	17 Geo. 3. c. 28	16 May 1777
An Act to revive and continue such Part of an Act, made in the last Session of Parliament, intituled, "An Act for allowing the Exportation of certain Quantities of Wheat and other Articles, to His Majesty's Sugar Colonies in America, and to the Island of Saint Helena, and to the other Settlements belonging to the United Company of Merchants of England trading to the East Indies; and of Biscuit and Pease to Newfoundland, Nova Scotia, Bay Chaleur, and Labrador; and for indemnifying all Persons with respect to advising or carrying into Execution His Majesty's Orders of Council already made, for allowing the Exportation of Wheat and other Articles," (Note: Exportation Act 1776 (16 Geo. 3. c. 37)) as expired on the First Day of January One thousand seven hundred and seventy-seven. (Repealed by Statute Law Revision Act 1871 (34 & 35 Vict. c. 116))
Adulteration of Tea Act 1776 (repealed)	17 Geo. 3. c. 29	16 May 1777
An Act for the more effectual Prevention of the manufacturing of Ash, Elder, Sloe, and other Leaves, in Imitation of Tea; and to prevent Frauds in the Revenue of Excise in respect to Tea. (Repealed by Statute Law Revision Act 1958 (6 & 7 Eliz. 2. c. 46))
Bills of Exchange Act 1776 (repealed)	17 Geo. 3. c. 30	16 May 1777
An Act for further restraining the Negotiation of Promissory Notes, and Inland Bills of Exchange, under a limited Sum, within that Part of Great Britain called England. (Repealed by Bills of Exchange Act 1882 (45 & 46 Vict. c. 61))
Composition for a Crown Debt Act 1776 (repealed)	17 Geo. 3. c. 31	16 May 1777
An Act to enable the Commissioners for executing the Office of Treasurer of His Majesty's Exchequer, or the Lord High Treasurer for the Time being, to make an Agreement or Composition with the several Sureties of William Brown, and the Representatives of such of the said Sureties as are dead, for a Debt remaining due from them to the Crown on several Tobacco Bonds, entered into and executed by such Sureties respectively; and that they, and their Estates and Effects, may be acquitted and discharged therefrom. (Repealed by Statute Law Revision Act 1948 (11 & 12 Geo. 6. c. 62))
Buckingham Church Act 1776	17 Geo. 3. c. 32	30 April 1777
An Act for building a new Church within the Town and Parish of Buckingham.
Dyers Act 1776 (repealed)	17 Geo. 3. c. 33	2 June 1777
An Act to allow the Master Dyers, within the Counties of Middlesex, Essex, Surrey, and Kent, to employ Journeymen in their Trade who have not served Apprenticeships thereto. (Repealed by Statute Law Revision Act 1861 (24 & 25 Vict. c. 101))
Navigation (No. 2) Act 1776 (repealed)	17 Geo. 3. c. 34	2 June 1777
An Act for the better Supply of Mariners and Seamen to serve in His Majesty's Ships of War, and on board Merchant Ships, and other Trading Ships and Vessels. (Repealed by Statute Law Revision Act 1871 (34 & 35 Vict. c. 116))
Importation (No. 3) Act 1776 (repealed)	17 Geo. 3. c. 35	2 June 1777
An Act for further continuing an Act, passed in the Sixth Year of His present Majesty's Reign, intituled, "An Act to prohibit the Importation of Foreign Wrought Silks and Velvets, for a limited Time; and for preventing unlawful Combinations of Workmen employed in the Silk Manufacture." (Note: Importation, etc. Act 1766 (6 Geo. 3. c. 28)) (Repealed by Statute Law Revision Act 1871 (34 & 35 Vict. c. 116))
First Meetings of Commissioners, etc. Act 1776 (repealed)	17 Geo. 3. c. 36	2 June 1777
An Act for enlarging the Times appointed for the first Meetings of Commissioners or Trustees for putting in Execution certain Acts of this Session of Parliament. (Repealed by Statute Law Revision Act 1871 (34 & 35 Vict. c. 116))
Indemnity Act 1776 (repealed)	17 Geo. 3. c. 37	2 June 1777
An Act to Indemnify such Persons as have omitted to qualify themselves for Offices and Employments; and to indemnify Justices of the Peace or others, who have omitted to register or deliver in their Qualifications within the Time limited by Law, and for giving further Time for those Purposes; and to indemnify Members and Officers in Cities, Corporations, and Borough Towns, whose Admissions have been omitted to be stamped according to Law, or having been stamped, have been lost or mislaid, and for allowing them Time to provide Admissions duly stamped; and to give further Time to such Persons as have omitted to make and file Affidavits of the Execution of Indentures of Clerks to Attornies and Solicitors. (Repealed by Promissory Oaths Act 1871 (34 & 35 Vict. c. 48))
Loans or Exchequer Bills (No. 3) Act 1776 (repealed)	17 Geo. 3. c. 38	2 June 1777
An Act for raising a certain Sum of Money by Loans or Exchequer Bills, for the Service of the Year One thousand seven hundred and seventy-seven. (Repealed by Statute Law Revision Act 1871 (34 & 35 Vict. c. 116))
Taxation (No. 2) Act 1776 (repealed)	17 Geo. 3. c. 39	6 June 1777
An Act for granting to His Majesty a Duty upon all Servants retained or employed in the several Capacities therein mentioned; and for repealing several Rates and Duties upon Glass, imposed by an Act made in the Nineteenth Year of the Reign of His late Majesty, (Note: National Debt Act 1745 (19 Geo. 2. c. 12)) and for granting to His Majesty other Rates and Duties upon Glass in lieu thereof; and for the better collecting the Duties upon Glass; and for repealing the several Rates and Duties charged by an Act, made in the Twenty-ninth Year of the Reign of His said late Majesty, (Note: Taxation (No. 3) Act 1756 (29 Geo. 2. c. 14)) upon all Persons and Bodies Politick and Corporate, having certain Quantities of Silver Plate. (Repealed by Statute Law Revision Act 1861 (24 & 25 Vict. c. 101))
Captures Act 1776 (repealed)	17 Geo. 3. c. 40	2 June 1777
An Act to authorize the carrying of the Captures therein mentioned into any Part of His Majesty's Dominions in North America; and for ascertaining the Value of such Part of Ships and Goods as belong to the Re-captors. (Repealed by Statute Law Revision Act 1861 (24 & 25 Vict. c. 101))
Customs (No. 5) Act 1776 (repealed)	17 Geo. 3. c. 41	2 June 1777
An Act to prevent the clandestine unshipping from and receiving Goods at Sea on board Vessels employed in the East India Company's Service; for ascertaining the Manner of discharging Bonds given for the due Exportation of certain Goods from Great Britain to Foreign Parts; and to oblige the Masters of British or Irish Ships, sailing from any of His Majesty's Dominions into the Baltic, to deliver a Manifesto of their Cargoes to the British Consul residing there. (Repealed by Customs Law Repeal Act 1825 (6 Geo. 4. c. 105))
Bricks and Tiles Act 1776 (repealed)	17 Geo. 3. c. 42	2 June 1777
An Act for preventing Abuses in the making and vending Bricks and Tiles. (Repealed by Repeal of Obsolete Statutes Act 1856 (19 & 20 Vict. c. 64))
Customs (No. 6) Act 1776 (repealed)	17 Geo. 3. c. 43	2 June 1777
An Act for repealing the Eleventh Rule in the Book of Rates, so far as the same relates to making any Allowance upon the Importation of damaged Currants and Raisins, and for making the Importer of such Goods an Abatement in the Duties in lieu thereof; and for explaining the said Rule with respect to such Allowance for Damage on other Goods; and to permit the Exportation of Tobacco-pipe Clay from this Kingdom to the British Sugar Colonies or Plantations in the West Indies, for a limited Time. (Repealed by Customs Law Repeal Act 1825 (6 Geo. 4. c. 105))
Continuance of Laws Act 1776 (repealed)	17 Geo. 3. c. 44	2 June 1777
An Act to continue the several Laws therein mentioned, relating to encouraging the making of Indico in the British Plantations in America; to the registering the Prices at which Corn is sold in the several Counties of Great Britain, and the Quantity exported and imported; to encouraging the manufacturing of Leather, by lowering the Duty payable upon the Importation of Oak Bark, when the Price of such Bark shall exceed a certain Rate; to the allowing Timber and Wood to be exported from the Island of Dominica into any other of the British Islands, Colonies or Plantations in America; and to the allowing a Bounty on the Exportation of British-made Cordage. (Repealed by Statute Law Revision Act 1871 (34 & 35 Vict. c. 116))
Papists Act 1776 (repealed)	17 Geo. 3. c. 45	2 June 1777
An Act for allowing further Time for Enrolment of Deeds and Wills made by Papists; and for Relief of Protestant Purchasers. (Repealed by Statute Law Revision Act 1871 (34 & 35 Vict. c. 116))
National Debt Act 1776 (repealed)	17 Geo. 3. c. 46	6 June 1777
An Act for raising a certain Sum of Money by Way of Annuities; and for establishing a Lottery. (Repealed by Statute Law Revision Act 1870 (33 & 34 Vict. c. 69))
Appropriation Act 1776 (repealed)	17 Geo. 3. c. 47	6 June 1777
An Act for granting to His Majesty a certain Sum of Money out of the Sinking Fund; and for applying certain Monies therein mentioned for the Service of the Year One thousand seven hundred and seventy-seven; and for further appropriating the Supplies granted in this Session of Parliament. (Repealed by Statute Law Revision Act 1871 (34 & 35 Vict. c. 116))
Finding of the Longitude at Sea Act 1776 (repealed)	17 Geo. 3. c. 48	6 June 1777
An Act for rendering more effectual an Act, made in the Fourteenth Year of the Reign of His present Majesty, (Note: Discovery of Longitude at Sea Act 1774 (14 Geo. 3. c. 66)) for promoting the Discovery of a Method for finding the Longitude at Sea, so far as relates to the Encouragement and Reward of Persons making lesser Discoveries for finding the same, or making other useful Discoveries and Improvements in Navigation; and to the making of Experiments relating thereto. (Repealed by Statute Law Revision Act 1871 (34 & 35 Vict. c. 116))
Composition for a Crown Debt (No. 2) Act 1776 (repealed)	17 Geo. 3. c. 49	2 June 1777
An Act to enable the Lords Commissioners of His Majesty's Treasury, to compound a Debt due to the Crown, from the Estate of William Harry deceased, and his Sureties. (Repealed by Statute Law Revision Act 1948 (11 & 12 Geo. 6. c. 62))
Auctioneers' Licences Act 1776 (repealed)	17 Geo. 3. c. 50	6 June 1777
An Act for granting to His Majesty certain Duties on Licences, to be taken out by all Persons acting as Auctioneers; and certain Rates and Duties on all Lands, Houses, Goods, and other Things, sold by Auction; and upon Indentures, Leases, Bonds, Deeds, and other Instruments. (Repealed by Inland Revenue Repeal Act 1870 (33 & 34 Vict. c. 99))
Loans or Exchequer Bills (No. 4) Act 1776 (repealed)	17 Geo. 3. c. 51	6 June 1777
An Act for enabling His Majesty to raise the Sum of One Million, for the Uses and Purposes therein mentioned. (Repealed by Statute Law Revision Act 1871 (34 & 35 Vict. c. 116))
Duties on Soap, etc. Act 1776 (repealed)	17 Geo. 3. c. 52	2 June 1777
An Act for better securing the Duties on Soap, and the Duties on Rum of the Sugar Plantations put into Warehouses; and for allowing a Drawback of the Duties on Rum shipped as Stores, to be consumed on board Merchant Ships on their Voyages, for a limited Time. (Repealed by Statute Law Revision Act 1871 (34 & 35 Vict. c. 116))
Clergy Residences Repair Act 1776 or the Gilbert Act	17 Geo. 3. c. 53	6 June 1777
An Act to promote the Residence of the Parochial Clergy, by making Provision for the more speedy and effectual building, re-building, repairing or purchasing Houses, and other necessary Buildings and Tenements, for the Use of their Benefices.
Westmorland Gaol, etc. Act 1776 (repealed)	17 Geo. 3. c. 54	6 June 1777
An Act for defraying the Expence of building a new Gaol and Shire-Hall for the County of Westmorland. (Repealed by Statute Law (Repeals) Act 2008 (c. 12))
Manufacture of Hats Act 1776 (repealed)	17 Geo. 3. c. 55	6 June 1777
An Act for the better regulating the Hat Manufactory. (Repealed by Master and Servant Act 1889 (52 & 53 Vict. c. 24))

=== Private acts ===
Short title	Citation	Royal assent
Long title
Crownthorpe Common Inclosure Act 1776	17 Geo. 3. c. 1 Pr.	2 December 1776
An Act for dividing and enclosing the Commons and Waste Grounds, in the Manor and Parish of Crownthorpe, in the County of Norfolk.
Gottlieb's Naturalization Act 1776	17 Geo. 3. c. 2 Pr.	2 December 1776
An Act for naturalizing Andreas Goltlieb.
Melasse's Naturalization Act 1776	17 Geo. 3. c. 3 Pr.	2 December 1776
An Act for naturalizing Gilles Prudent Melasse.
Hartman's Naturalization Act 1776	17 Geo. 3. c. 4 Pr.	2 December 1776
An Act for naturalizing Dorothea Margreta Hartman.
Tax and Gottlieb's Naturalization Act 1776	17 Geo. 3. c. 5 Pr.	2 December 1776
An Act for naturalizing Paul Johan Christian Tax and John Vallientine Gottlieb.

=== Sources ===
- Pickering, Danby, ed. (1775). "17 George III - 1776-7". The Statutes at Large. Vol. 31. Cambridge: Charles Bathurst. pp. 293–464 – via Google Books.
- Journals of the House of Commons. Vol. 36. London: His Majesty's Stationery Office. 1803. pp. 3–540 – via Google Books.
- Chronological Table of and Index to the Statutes. Vol. 1: To the End of the Session 59 Vict. Sess. 2 (1895) (13th ed.). London: Her Majesty's Stationery Office. 1896. pp. 133–134 – via Google Books.
- "Acts of the Parliament of Great Britain from 1776". legislation.gov.uk. The National Archives.

== See also ==
- List of acts of the Parliament of Great Britain
