= Delph Locks =

Coordinates: 52.4768°N 2.1207°W

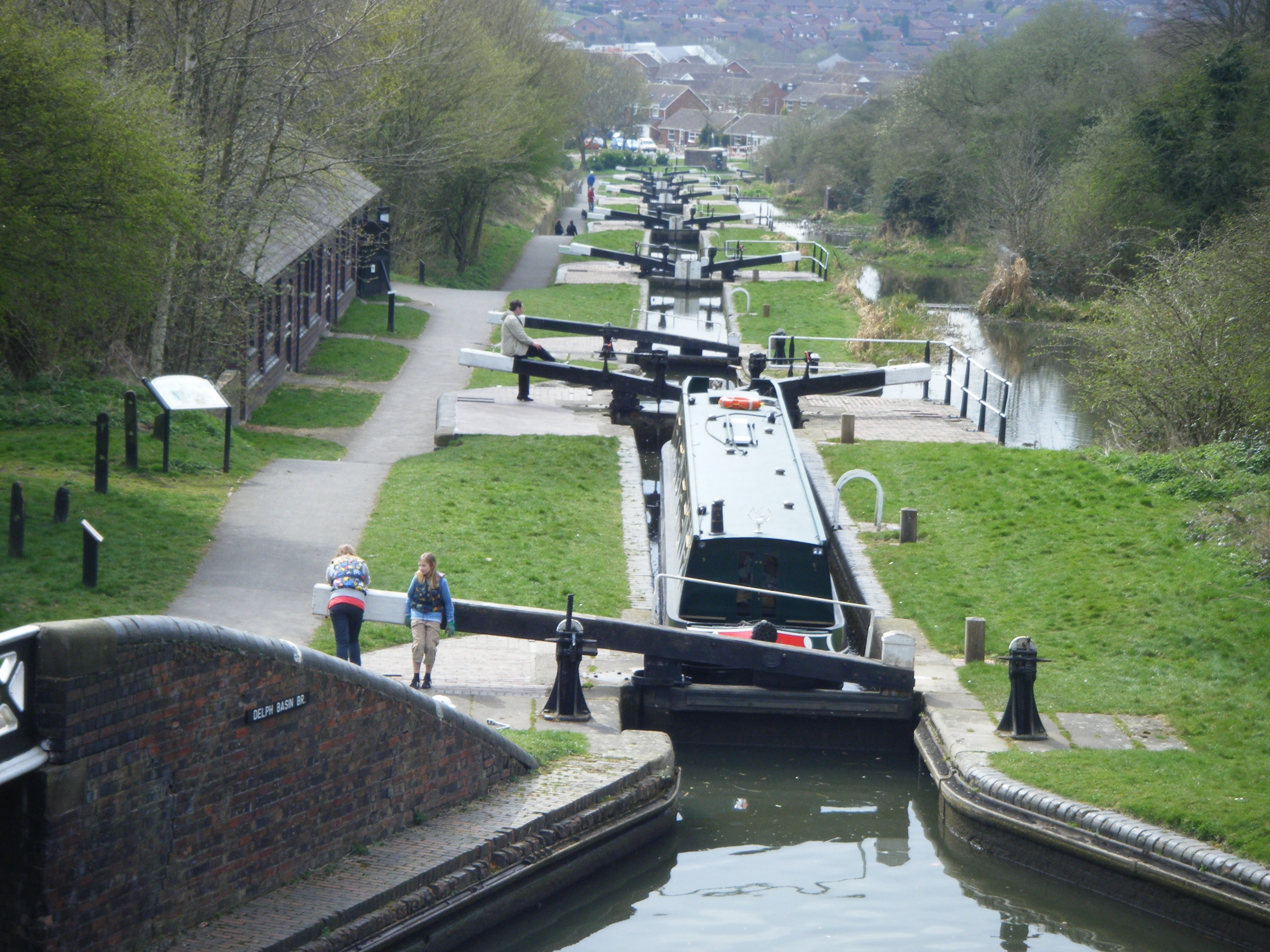
- The flight from lock 2
- Waterway: Dudley Canal
- Maintained by: Canal & River Trust
- Operation: Manual
- First built: 1799
- Length: 70 feet (21.3 m)
- Width: 7 feet (2.1 m)
- Fall: 85 feet (26 m)
- Above sea level: top lock: 441 feet (134 m)
- Flight of 8 locks

Delph Locks or the Delph Nine are a series of eight (originally nine) narrow canal locks on the Dudley No. 1 Canal in Brierley Hill, in the West Midlands, England. They were opened in 1779, and reopened in 1967 following restoration of the Dudley Canal and the Stourbridge Canal in a joint venture between the Staffordshire and Worcestershire Canal Society and the British Waterways Board.

== History ==
The Dudley Canal and the Stourbridge Canal were originally planned as a single canal, for which a bill was submitted to Parliament in the spring of 1775. It was opposed by the Birmingham Canal Navigations, and so the project was split in two and resubmitted. Despite continued opposition by the Birmingham Canal, both canals were authorised by separate Acts of Parliament on 2 April 1776.

Engineer Thomas Dadford was responsible for the construction of the Dudley Canal, which terminated at a flight of nine locks at its southern end. Construction was finished in June 1779, but the locks saw little use until the opening of the Stourbridge Canal, which took place in December. Dadford's son, also called Thomas, was engineer for the Stourbridge Canal. In 1787, discussions took place about amalgamating the two companies, but they remained separate, although they always worked closely together.

The bottom lock at Black Delph Bridge is at the termination of the Dudley Canal and forms the boundary with the Stourbridge Canal. The flight has distinctive waterfall overflow weirs, and rises from the 356-foot (109 m) Stourbridge level to the 441-foot (134 m) level of the Dudley No. 1 canal. The middle seven of the original 1779 locks were rebuilt in 1858 as six new locks, reducing the flight to eight. Some ruins of the old locks are visible to the side of the new.

The two canals ceased to carry commercial traffic, and by the early 1950s were unusable. The Inland Waterways Protection Society put forward a case for restoring the Dudley and Stourbridge Canals in 1959, but Dudley Tunnel to the north was officially closed in 1962. However, in 1964 the British Waterways Board and the Staffordshire and Worcestershire Canal Society agreed to work on restoring both canals, and this early example of co-operation resulted in the locks reopening in 1967.

== Location ==
The Delph Locks and surrounding land form the Delph 'Nine' Locks Conservation Area, Brierley Hill, Metropolitan Borough of Dudley. An iron roving bridge manufactured by Horsley Ironworks stands near the top lock, while the original lock-keeper's house, built in 1779 and modified in the nineteenth century, is a grade II listed structure, as it is one of only a few surviving houses of its type.

From the top of the flight, the Dudley Canal is level for 1.8 miles (2.9 km) to Blowers Green Lock and the junction with the Dudley No. 2 Canal. From the bottom of the flight, the Stourbridge Canal is level for the same distance to Leys Junction, where the Fens Branch heads to the north east and the Fens Pools reservoirs, while the main line descends 145 feet (44 m) through a flight of sixteen locks.

== See also ==
- Canals of the United Kingdom
- History of the British canal system

== Bibliography ==
- Cumberlidge, Jane (2009). Inland Waterways of Great Britain (8th Ed). Imray Laurie Norie and Wilson. ISBN 978-1-84623-010-3.
- Hadfield, Charles (1985). The Canals of the West Midlands. David and Charles. ISBN 0-7153-8644-1.
- Nicholson (2006). Nicholson Guides Vol 2: Severn Avon and Birmingham. Harper Collins. ISBN 978-0-00-721110-4.
- Pearson, Michael (1989). Canal Companion - Birmingham Canal Navigations. J. M. Pearson & Associates. ISBN 0-907864-49-X.
- Squires, Roger (2008). Britain's restored canals. Landmark Publishing. ISBN 978-1-84306-331-5.
