= Stourbridge Canal =

Canal in England

Coordinates: 52.4707°N 2.1585°W

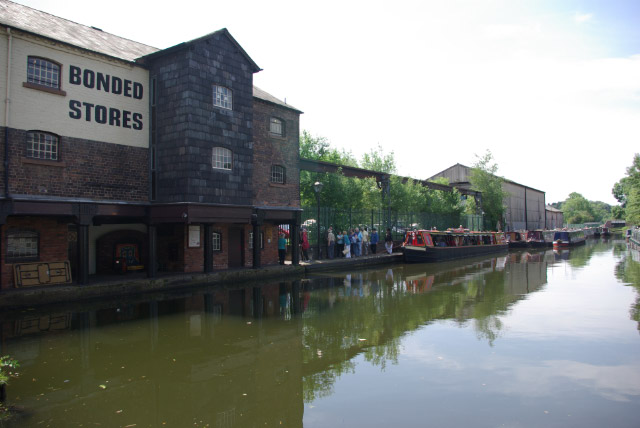
- The terminus of the Stourbridge Town arm of the canal
- Interactive map of Stourbridge Canal

Specifications
- Length: 5.25 miles (8.45 km)
- Maximum boat length: 70 ft 0 in (21.34 m)
- Maximum boat beam: 7 ft 0 in (2.13 m)
- Locks: 20
- Status: Open
- Navigation authority: Canal and River Trust

History
- Original owner: Stourbridge Canal Company
- Principal engineer: Thomas Dadford
- Date of act: 2 April 1776
- Date of first use: 1779

Geography
- Start point: Brierley Hill
- End point: Stourton, Staffordshire
- Connects to: Staffs & Worcs Canal, Dudley Canal

The Stourbridge Canal is a canal in the West Midlands of England. It links the Staffordshire and Worcestershire Canal (at Stourton Junction, affording access to traffic from the River Severn) with the Dudley Canal, and hence, via the Birmingham Canal Navigations, to Birmingham and the Black Country.

== History ==
Stourbridge Canal Act 1776
- Act of Parliament
- Parliament of Great Britain
- Long title: An Act for making and maintaining a Navigable Canal from or near the Town of Stourbridge, in the County of Worcester, to join the Staffordshire and Worcestershire Canal, at or near Stourton, in the County of Stafford; and also Two Collateral Cuts, One from a Place called The Fens upon Pensnet Chace, to communicate with the intended Canal near the Junction of Wordesley Brook with the River Stour; and the other from a Place called Black Delph, upon the said Chafe, to join the first-mentioned Collateral Cut, at or near certain Lands called The Lays, in the Parish of Kingswinford, in the said County of Stafford.
- Citation: 16 Geo. 3. c. 28
- Territorial extent: Great Britain

Dates
- Royal assent: 2 April 1776
- Commencement: 26 October 1775 (Note: Start of session.)
Other legislation
Amended by	Stourbridge Canal Act 1782; Stourbridge Canal Act 1865; Stroudwater Navigation Act 1954

Status: Amended

Text of statute as originally enacted

The Stourbridge and Dudley canals were originally proposed as a single canal in 1775, with a primary purpose of carrying coal from Dudley to Stourbridge. Robert Whitworth had carried out a survey, which was approved at a meeting held in Stourbridge in February, at which the estimated cost was promised by subscribers. The chief promoter was Lord Dudley, but the bill was withdrawn from Parliament following fierce opposition from the Birmingham Canals. Two bills were presented in the autumn, one for each of the canals, with the details largely unchanged, and both became acts of Parliament on 2 April 1776, the Stourbridge Canal Act 1776 (16 Geo. 3. c. 28) and the Dudley Canal Act 1776 (16 Geo. 3. c. 66), despite continued opposition from Birmingham. The Stourbridge Canal Act 1776 allowed the promoters to raise £30,000, but unlike most such acts, did not make any provision for additional amounts. Thomas Dadford was appointed as engineer, with James Green as an assistant. Work started on the aqueduct which would carry the canal over the River Stour.

Stourbridge Canal Act 1782
- Act of Parliament
- Parliament of Great Britain
- Long title: An Act to explain, amend and render more effectual an Act made in the Sixteenth Year of the Reign of His present Majesty, for making and maintaining a Navigable Canal from or near the Town of Stourbridge, in the County of Worcester, to join the Staffordshire and Worcestershire Canal at or near Stourton, in the County of Stafford; and also Two collateral Cuts therein mentioned.
- Citation: 22 Geo. 3. c. 14
- Territorial extent: Great Britain

Dates
- Royal assent: 25 March 1782
- Commencement: 27 November 1781
Other legislation
Amends	Stourbridge Canal Act 1776
Amended by	Stourbridge Canal Act 1865; Stourbridge Navigation Act 1935

Status: Amended

Text of statute as originally enacted

The £30,000 of share capital had been spent by April 1778, and although not authorised to do so, the company issued bonds to raise more money. Construction was largely complete by 1779, and trading began. All of the canal was probably open by December. Dadford resigned in 1781, and the following year, a second act of Parliament, the Stourbridge Canal Act 1782 (22 Geo. 3. c. 14), was obtained, to authorise the raising of an extra £10,000, and to legitimise the bonds already issued. The total cost was thus £43,000. Tolls on coal which originated on the canal and was then carried on the Staffordshire and Worcestershire Canal were higher than for other coal on that canal, and the Stourbridge Company had failed to get this clause repealed. They therefore sought to bypass the Staffordshire and Worcestershire Canal, and approached the Birmingham Canals in 1784, with a proposal for a link between the Dudley Canal and their system. This resulted in the Dudley Canal Act 1785 (25 Geo. 3. c. 87) which authorised the building of the Dudley Tunnel, which opened in 1792. They also proposed a 26-mile (42 km) canal from Stourbridge to the River Severn at Diglis, which would have required two tunnels and 128 locks. The bill for that proposed canal was rejected in 1786 when it reached the House of Lords, following opposition by the Staffordshire and Worcestershire Canal Company, but they reduced their tolls for Stourbridge coal two years later. A healthy trade in coal, ironstone and limestone developed, supplemented by iron products, bricks, clay, earthenware and glass. A dividend of 2.45 per cent was paid in 1785, which had risen to 6.3 per cent by 1789.

=== Operation ===
Trade continued to increase, reaching 100,000 tons in 1796, and continuing upwards as the iron and coal industries developed and the canal became part of a through route, following the opening of the Dudley Tunnel and the Dudley Canal's extension through the Lapal Tunnel to Selly Oak. Dividends increased steadily, with 13.75 per cent being paid in 1840. In order to maintain their position, they helped to fund the enlargement of Gad's Green reservoir, on the Dudley Canal, and also gave money to several coal mines to assist with pumping, on condition that the water was diverted into the canal. Stourbridge basin had to be enlarged in 1807 to cope with the volume of traffic. Further traffic came after 1815, when the Worcester and Birmingham Canal opened. Iron bound for London was shipped from Coalbrookdale via the canal and the Dudley's Selly Oak branch.

In the 1820s, several wharves were built on the Fens Branch, to serve the developing collieries near Kingswinford, and the company considered applying for a new act of Parliament in 1829, to give them powers to build extra lines in this area, but they did not proceed. Instead, plans were developed for the Stourbridge Extension Canal, which served a similar purpose and opened in 1840. On a more personal level, the lockkeeper at Stourton received a pay rise in 1830, as the locks were now in use all night and on Sundays, while the Stourbridge lock-keeper received a similar reward in 1834, and a larger one two years later. In 1836, 144,606 tons of coal were carried, besides all the other traffic.

=== Railway Age ===
Stourbridge Canal Act 1865 (Note: Section 1.)
- Act of Parliament
- Parliament of the United Kingdom
- Long title: An Act to amend the Provisions of the Acts relating to the Company of Proprietors of the Stourbridge Navigation, and to confer further Powers on that Company; and for other Purposes.
- Citation: 28 & 29 Vict. c. lxxix
- Territorial extent: Great Britain

Dates
- Royal assent: 19 June 1865
- Commencement: 19 June 1865 (Note: The Acts of Parliament (Commencement) Act 1793.)
Other legislation
Amends	Stourbridge Canal Act 1776; Stourbridge Canal Act 1782

Status: Amended

Text of statute as originally enacted

In 1844, the Oxford, Worcester and Wolverhampton Railway (OWWR) announced their intention to build a line which would partly run parallel to both the canal and the Dudley Canal. Despite opposition by the canal company, the line was built and opened in 1852 and 1853. However, its effect was not immediately significant, and a proposed reduction in tolls was not deemed to be necessary. Some goods were transferred to the railway from a private basin, which ultimately led to an agreement on tolls for such transfers and the construction in 1858 of a transhipment siding on Stourbridge wharf. Trade held up well, derived from six ironworks and a tinplate works situated on the canal above the Stourbridge flight, traffic from the collieries on the Extension Canal, and various other industrial concerns, including fire-brick manufacturers and glassworks. The Stourbridge Canal Act 1865 (28 & 29 Vict. c. lxxix) introduced powers to charge mileage tolls for traffic using the upper level, but not passing through any locks. Income gradually dropped, and the dividend was below 8 per cent for the first time in 1873. For many canal companies, the Railway and Canal Traffic Act 1888 (51 & 52 Vict. c. 25) had a detrimental effect on revenue, but the Stourbridge tolls increased significantly, from £1,695 in 1894 to £2,718 in 1896.

A programme of dredging and other improvements, which enabled local trade to continue, kept the company profitable until effective competition from road vehicles began. In 1929, tolls were £3,750, although revenue from other sources increased income to £5,270, and a 3 per cent dividend was paid. By 1938, the operating profit was just £222. Tolls were down to £1,278 in 1946, and commercial traffic continued to decline until it ceased.

=== Stourbridge Extension Canal ===
A separate company built the Stourbridge Extension Canal from the Fens Branch to Shut End (in Kingswinford) thus opening up another part of the coalfield to development. This passed into the hands of the West Midland Railway, the successor to the OWWR in 1860, which then became part of the Great Western Railway soon afterwards. It remained in use until after the Second World War. Most of it was then filled in, apart from a few yards at the Fens Branch end, which remain watered and serve as a mooring place.

=== 1903 breach ===
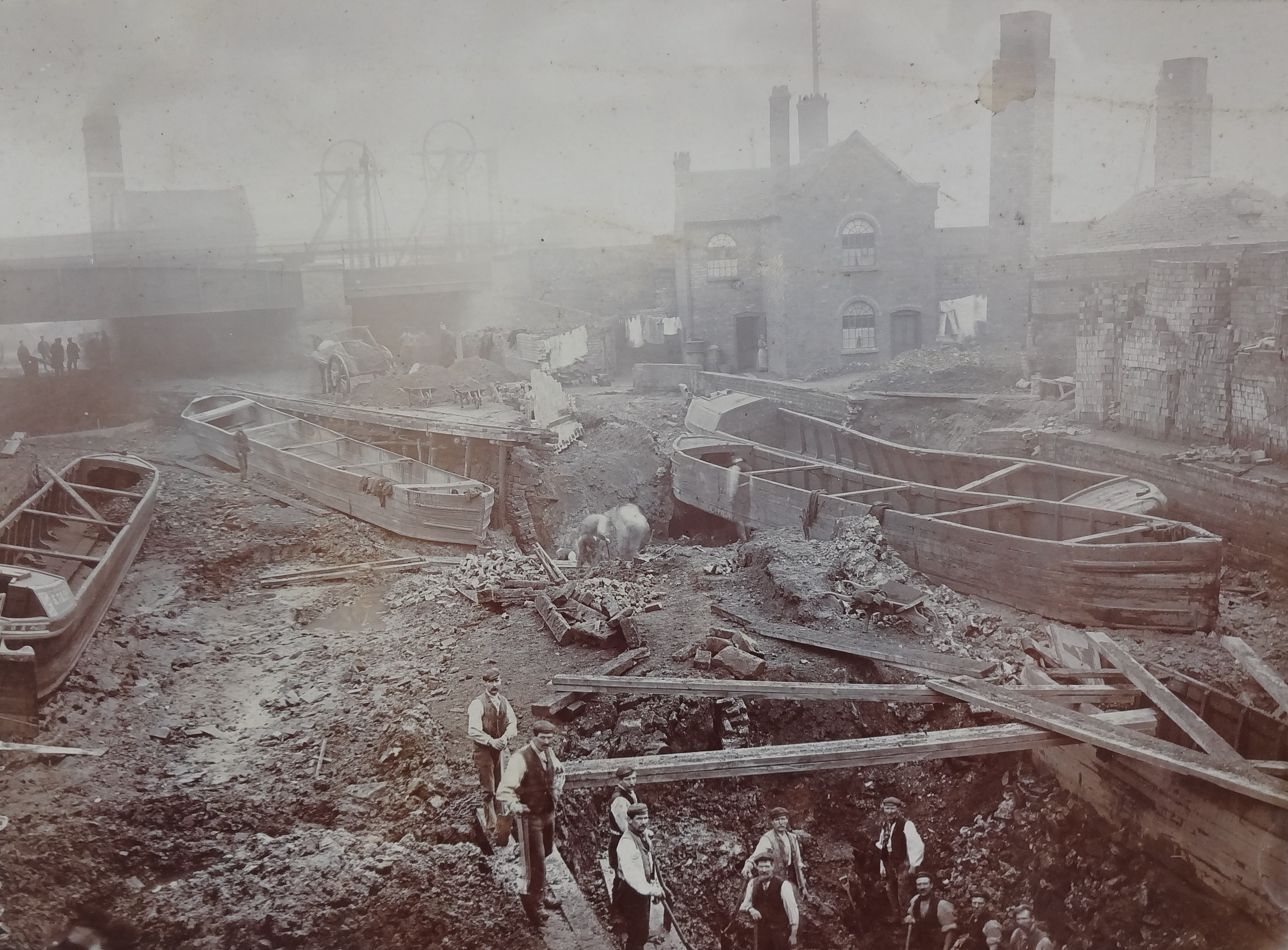
1903 Canal Collapse at Brettel Lane - View from Brettel Lane Bridge

On 14 November 1903 a portion of the canal bank and bottom collapsed into mine-workings, affecting a 3-mile (4.8 km) section of the canal. The breach occurred in the basin that was then on the west side of the canal as it passes between the Brettell Lane bridge and the railway bridge. The section of the canal from the Delph Locks to a short distance north of Brettell Lane bridge was completely drained of water, while further beyond the bridge the water level was significantly reduced as far as Leys junction. The water flooded nearby factories to a considerable depth, including the G. K. Harrison brick works which was beside the basin, and there was a great deal of subsidence. An 18-foot (5.5 m) boiler disappeared into one hole that opened up and the winding gear frame of a nearby mine collapsed into another. By great good fortune the breach happened on a Saturday afternoon when the miners and other workers had all gone home, otherwise there would have been considerable loss of life. The mines and factories were out of action for some time while repairs were made as they depended on the canal for water for steam generation, as well as to supply raw materials and take away finished products.

== Course ==
The canal leaves the Staffordshire and Worcestershire Canal at Stourton Junction, and immediately enters a four-lock flight to gain height. The pound above the locks is 1.7 miles (2.7 km) long, and crosses the River Stour on an aqueduct just before Wordsley Junction. At the junction, the Stourbridge Arm continues on the same level into the centre of Stourbridge, while a flight of sixteen locks takes the canal up the hill towards Pensnett Chase, where there were collieries. The bottom lock is just above the junction, and Leys Junction is just above the top lock. From here, the Fens Branch is a short, navigable feeder from Fens Pools and the main canal continues for 1.8 miles (2.9 km) to Delph Locks, a flight at the start of the Dudley Canal, which originally consisted of nine locks, but was rebuilt as eight in 1858.

The canal forms part of the Stourport Ring, which is one of the popular cruising rings for leisure boating. The length of the route is 74 miles (119 km), and it passes through 105 locks located on six inter-connected waterways.

=== Stourbridge Town Arm ===
At Wordsley Junction, the Stourbridge Town Arm heads south-east into the town of Stourbridge. The Stourbridge Town Branch Line railway was built in the late 1870s from Stourbridge Junction railway station, via Stourbridge Town railway station to serve Stourbridge Basin. The basin was for interchange between the railway and the canal and this aided the canal's continued use.

== Restoration ==
In 1958, the government-appointed Bowes Committee had listed the waterways which they thought ought to be retained for commercial operation, and the following year the Inland Waterways Redevelopment Advisory Committee (IWRAC) was set up to consider what to do with the rest. The Inland Waterways Protection Society, which had been formed in the East Midlands in 1958, produced a detailed proposal for the restoration of the Stourbridge and Dudley canals, which they presented to the IWRAC in August 1959. The Inland Waterways Association also began campaigning for the waterway, after the Stourbridge flight was closed in 1960, to allow a bridge to be repaired.

To assist their case, the Inland Waterways Association, in conjunction with the Staffordshire and Worcestershire Canal Society, organised a national boat rally at Stourbridge in 1962. British Waterways erected signs to announce that the Stourbridge flight could not be used, and the Stourbridge arm was already partially blocked by a shoal. After failing to get any assurance that the shoal would be removed, volunteers took action, and cleared the canal using a dragline excavator which they had borrowed. There were letters in The Daily Telegraph from both the IWA and British Waterways, which generated more publicity, and 118 boats arrived for the rally. Press coverage included sympathetic articles in The Times and The Daily Telegraph, local authorities showed support for a revived canal, and the role of the Staffordshire and Worcestershire Canal Society, who had jointly organised the event, was properly recognised.

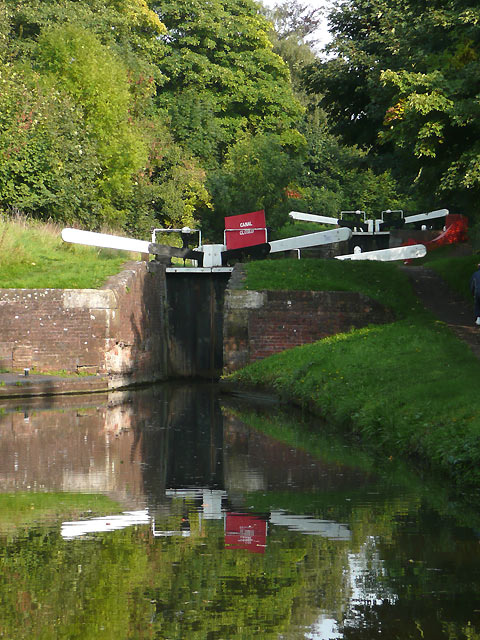
A "Closed" notice on the bottom lock following the 2008 breach

The British Waterways Board published a report in January 1964, called The Future of the Waterways, in which they suggested that the case for retention of the Stourbridge Canal was borderline, but that if there was practical support from those interested in its survival, then that might alter the balance. With the 16 locks unnavigable, the Staffordshire and Worcestershire Canal Society (S&WCS) proposed a restoration programme to the newly formed British Waterways Board in late 1963, where the navvying would be done by volunteers under the direction of British Waterways, who would also provide the materials. The Transport Act 1962 had paved the way for canals to be considered for their amenity value, rather than as purely commercial enterprises, and against this background, the S&WCS proposal was accepted as a test case by the Board, and restoration began in 1964.

Work of the canal was undertaken by weekend working parties, including members of the S&WCS, the Dudley Tunnel Society and the Coventry Canal Society. A progress report issued by the IWA in April 1965 ultimately led to the formation of a publication called Navvies Notebook, which informed people about what was happening. It allowed volunteers to be drawn from a wider area, and in 1967, a record 45 people participated in a weekend working party on the canal. The canal was opened to through navigation again in May 1967. Following that success British Waterways went on to accept similar restoration working parties across the canal system.

=== 2008 breach ===
During flooding of the River Stour on 7 September 2008 a major breach occurred. This swept away a length of towpath and bank between Bellsmill and Stourton Locks, completely draining the pounds, including the Stourbridge Town Arm. The problem was caused by the River Stour flooding the area around the Stourbridge terminus, resulting in water level surges further along the canal. British Waterways restored navigation from the Dudley Canal, via Delph Locks and Wordsley Junction into the Town Arm fairly quickly. The canal was re-opened on 18 December 2008 after British Waterways completed repairs costing £650,000 ahead of schedule. The work included a 105 cu yd (80 m^{3}) concrete block constructed at the foot of the embankment to stabilise it.

== Bibliography ==
- Allan, Garth. "My legacy: National Rally of Boats 1962". Garth Allan. Archived from the original on 1 May 2017.
- Cumberlidge, Jane (2009). Inland Waterways of Great Britain (8th Ed.). Imray Laurie Norie and Wilson. ISBN 978-1-84623-010-3.
- Hadfield, Charles (1969). Canals of the West Midlands. Newton Abbott: David & Charles. ISBN 978-0-7153-4660-0.
- Perrott, David; Mosse, Jonathan (2006). Nicholson Guides Vol 2 - Severn, Avon & Birmingham. Collins. ISBN 978-0-00-721110-4.
- Smith, Alan T (May 2004). "Battle of the Stourbridge Canal". Stourbridge. Archived from the original on 13 March 2012.
- Squires, Roger (2008). Britain's restored canals. Landmark Publishing. ISBN 978-1-84306-331-5.
- Birmingham Canal Navigations. GEOprojects. 2004. ISBN 0-86351-172-4. - Highly detailed printed 1:30,000 sheet map
