= Stourbridge Extension Canal =

Coordinates: 52.4872°N 2.1373°W

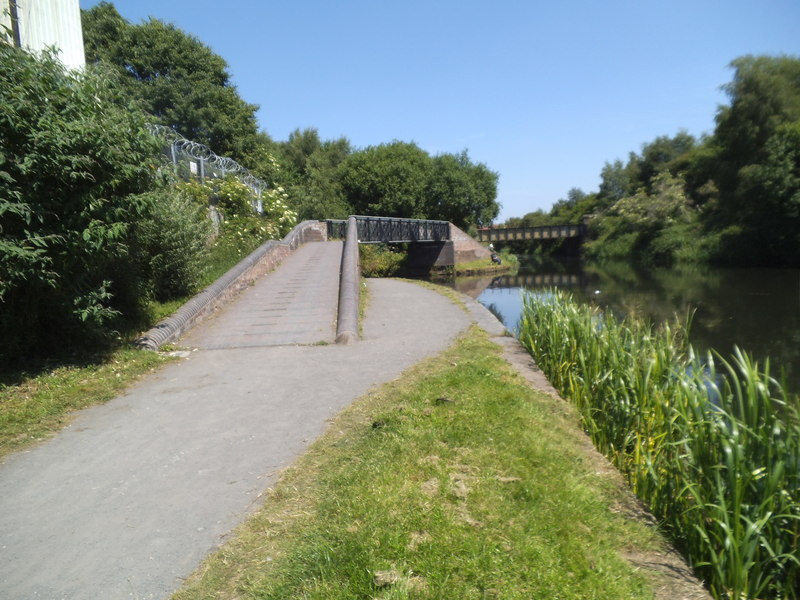
- The stub of the Extension Canal turns off the Stourbridge Canal feeder, and passes under the towpath bridge

Specifications
- Locks: none
- Status: small part extant

History
- Principal engineer: William Fowler, Benjamin Townshend, William Richardson
- Date of act: June 1837
- Date completed: 1840
- Date closed: 1935

Geography
- Connects to: Stourbridge Canal feeder

The Stourbridge Extension Canal was a short canal built to serve a number of mines in the Kingswinford area of Staffordshire in England. Although connected to the Stourbridge Canal, it was independent from it. It opened in 1840, and was abandoned in 1935. A short section of it is still used as moorings for boats using the Stourbridge Canal.

== History ==
Stourbridge Extension Canal Act 1837
- Act of Parliament
- Parliament of the United Kingdom
- Long title: An Act for making a Canal from the Stourbridge Navigation near Brockmoor in the Parish of Kingswinford in the County of Stafford to the Oak Farm Colliery, with a Branch to the Standhills, both in the said Parish of Kingswinford and County of Stafford.
- Citation: 7 Will. 4 & 1 Vict. c. liii

Dates
- Royal assent: 8 June 1837

In the 1820s, a number of coal mines opened up in the Kingswinford area, which was just to the north-west of the Fens branch of the Stourbridge Canal. Although a survey was carried out by Samuel Hodgekinson for a canal or a railway to service the mines, no definite proposals emerged. Gibbons and Co., owners of the first mine to open, built a tramway to Brockmoor in 1825, and a railway from the Staffordshire and Worcestershire Canal was constructed by Lord Dudley, which opened in 1829, but there were further plans for both canals and railways to the area of Shutt End. The Stourbridge Canal company then proposed an extension of their canal to Shutt End, but the scheme was opposed by Lord Dudley, and was not pursued. In 1836, the Stourbridge, Wolverhampton and Birmingham Junction Canal was proposed by a group of businessmen, including some of the Stourbridge Canal shareholders, who formed a separate company. This would have started near Fens Pool on the Stourbridge Canal and run via the mines at Shutt End to Straits Green and Cotwallend, before passing through a 1-mile (1.6 km) tunnel at Bloomfield to reach the Birmingham Canal Navigations main line near Factory Junction, where Thomas Telford's new main line left the old one. This did not meet with general approval, with opposition from Lord Dudley, the Dudley Canal company, the Staffordshire and Worcestershire Canal and the Birmingham Canal Navigation, and the company were unable to raise the £125,000 capital required for the project. Consequently, when they obtained an act of Parliament, the Stourbridge Extension Canal Act 1837 (7 Will. 4 & 1 Vict. c. liii), in June 1837, to authorise the work, it was for a much smaller scheme, running from Brockmoor to Oak Farm, just beyond Shutt End. One concession made was that they promised to buy the tramway which ran from Corbyn Hall to Brockmoor once the canal was operational.

Construction of the canal began in June 1837 with William Fowler as the engineer, who was replaced by Benjamin Townshend in September 1838, who had himself been replaced by William Richardson by the time construction was completed. The main contractor was James Frost, who was from Wednesbury. The canal was all on one level, with a stop lock at its junction with the Stourbridge Canal, and the length of the main line was about 2 miles (3.2 km). It was completed in 1840, opening on 27 June, and had cost £49,000, including £3,000 to purchase the tramway, which was paid for in 1841. The Sandhills Branch, which ran for 0.6 miles (0.97 km) from the main line to wharves and limekilns on the Kinswinford to Sandhills, was opened later in 1840. The 0.3-mile (0.48 km) Bromley Branch left the main line a little above the stop lock, and opened in 1841, although it was not authorised by the enabling act. The canal was a success, with good amounts of iron ore and limestone being carried to blast furnaces, and finished iron and coal being exported to the wider region.

=== The coming of the railways ===
The canal was barely open, when the railways posed a threat. The Oxford, Worcester and Wolverhampton Railway was active in the area, and in 1845 applied for an act of Parliament to authorise a number of routes, one of which would run along the banks of the canal. An agreement was reached, whereby the railway company would buy the canal if the act was granted. It was, as the Oxford, Worcester and Wolverhampton Railway Act 1845 (8 & 9 Vict. c. clxxxiv), and the canal passed into the hands of the railway company on 27 March 1847. Unlike many such takeovers, the Oxford, Worcester and Wolverhampton Railway Act 1845 specified that the canal was to be well maintained, that tolls were not to be raised so that the canal became uncompetitive, and gave powers to the Treasury or other government departments to intervene if the railway company did not run the canal in the public interest. The railway company paid £49,000 for the canal, and it provided one of the two sources of income to the new company, the other being the Stratford and Moreton Tramway, which they leased under the powers of the act. The canal thrived, carrying an average of 502,013 tons per year between 1850 and 1859, and seeing its profits trebling from £1,331 to £3,532 over the same period. By the 1850s, the canal served two brickworks, four collieries, and six ironworks, which operated a total of seventeen blast furnaces.

When the Oxford, Worcester and Wolverhampton Railway became part of the West Midland Railway and then the Great Western Railway, the canal also had new owners. Despite its short length, and the fact that much of the traffic travelled less than a mile on the canal, the canal still made a profit, and it was not until the early 1900s that traffic started to decline. The canal was finally abandoned in 1935.

== Today ==
Most of the canal was filled in after its abandonment. A trading estate covers most of the northern end of the Sandhill Branch, and housing has been built over the middle section. A short stub, from the Brockmoor Junction with the Stourbridge Canal to the stop lock at Bromley has been retained in water, and mooring facilities with a boundary fence were constructed by British Waterways on the north bank of the stub in 2004.

== See also ==
- Canals of Great Britain
- History of the British canal system

== Bibliography ==
- Hadfield, Charles (1985). The Canals of the West Midlands. David and Charles. ISBN 0-7153-8644-1.
