= California, Birmingham =

Suburban area of Birmingham, England

Coordinates: 52.444°N 1.975°W

California
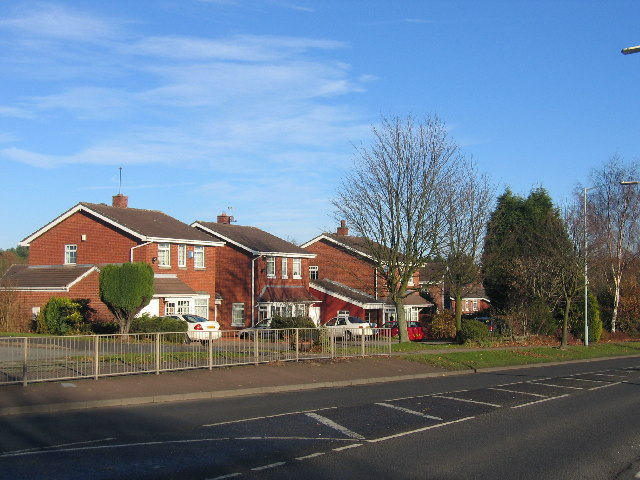

- Location within the West Midlands
- Metropolitan borough: Birmingham
- Metropolitan county: West Midlands
- Region: West Midlands
- Country: England
- Sovereign state: United Kingdom
- Post town: BIRMINGHAM
- Postcode district: B29 & B32
- Dialling code: 0121
- Police: West Midlands
- Fire: West Midlands
- Ambulance: West Midlands
- UK Parliament: Birmingham Edgbaston

California is a small suburban area of Birmingham, in the county of the West Midlands, England. It lies 4 miles (6.4 km) south west of Birmingham city centre, near Woodgate Valley Country Park. It is within Bartley Green ward and the Birmingham Edgbaston constituency.

== History ==
Originally within the parish of Northfield, Worcestershire, the settlement of California takes its name from the California Inn built by Isaac Flavell at the junction of Barnes Hill and Alwold Road. Barnes Hill is named after John Barnes, a master brickmaker who founded the earliest brickworks in the area. Flavell bought Stonehouse Farm and the surrounding land in 1842, and set up a brickmaking business. There are tales that the name of the California Inn was taken from the state of California, where Flavell had earlier made "something of a fortune" in the California Gold Rush. However the Gold Rush did not start until 1848 and records show that Flavell was established in business well before that, with operations at Gas Street as well as the Stonehouse site. The village became well known for brick making. The bricks were transported by canal barge along the Dudley No. 2 Canal, California being the eastern portal of the Lapal Tunnel. From 1877 brickmaking in the area started to decline, but it was not until the late 1940s that it ceased altogether. California became part of Birmingham in 1911 along with Northfield.

== Modern suburb ==
Today California is a largely residential area centred on the junction of Barnes Hill (the B4121) and Stonehouse Way, off which is Woodgate Valley Fire Station. It is bounded to the west by Woodgate Valley Country Park and to its east by the Bourn Brook, which forms the boundary with Harborne. The clay pits for brickmaking have been filled in and grassed over; one site is now the playing field of Hillcrest School. Nearby places include Harborne, Bartley Green and Weoley Castle.

== Transport ==
California lies along the B4121, which runs from Cotteridge to Quinton. The area is linked to Birmingham city centre by National Express West Midlands routes 23, 76 and X22. The 76 also links the area to Weoley Castle and Northfield anc the 23 and X22 provide links to Bartley Green. Kev's Car and Coaches bus services 39 and 39A link the area to Quinton and Woodgate Valley.
