= Weoley Castle =

Area of Birmingham, England

Coordinates: 52.437°N 1.970°W

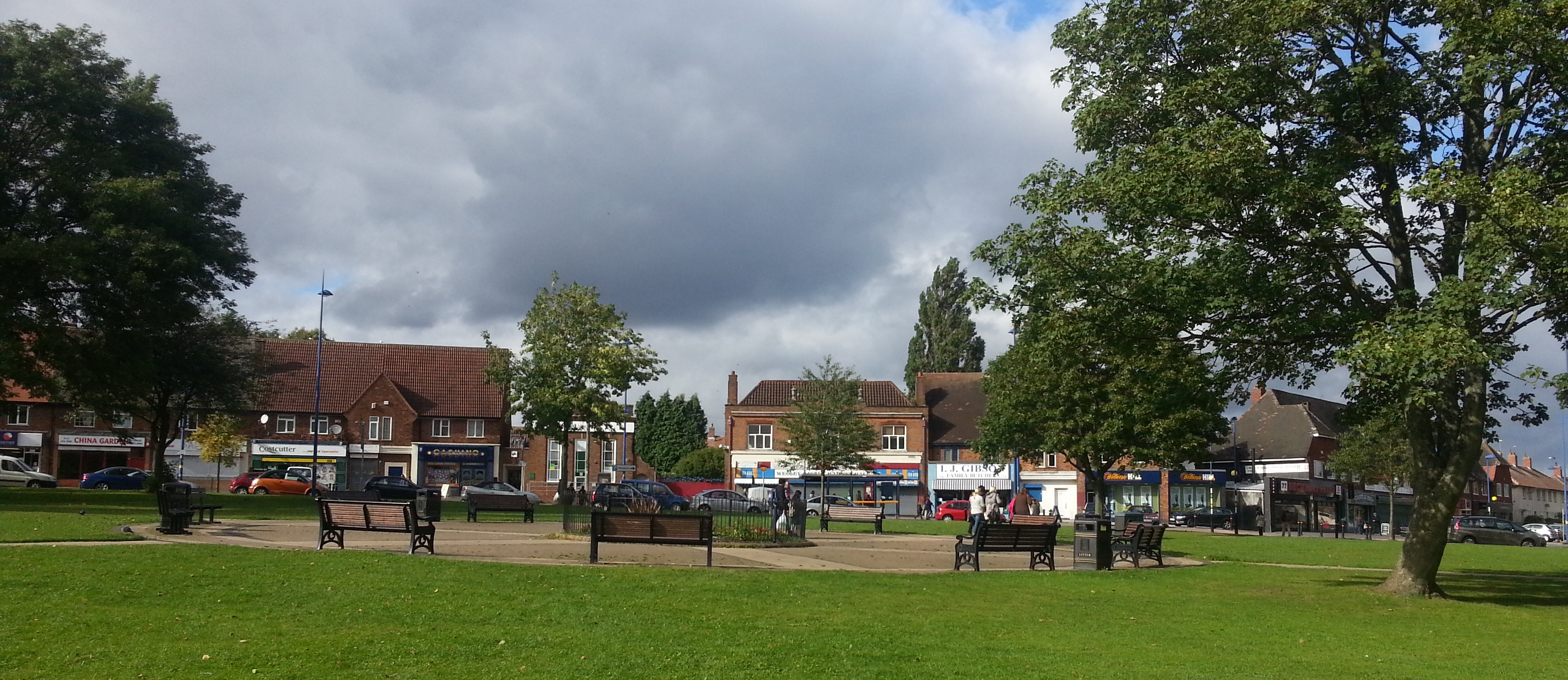
- Weoley Castle Square

- Location within the West Midlands
- Metropolitan borough: Birmingham
- Metropolitan county: West Midlands
- Region: West Midlands
- Country: England
- Sovereign state: United Kingdom
- Post town: BIRMINGHAM
- Postcode district: B29
- Dialling code: 0121
- Police: West Midlands
- Fire: West Midlands
- Ambulance: West Midlands
- UK Parliament: Birmingham Northfield

Weoley Castle (UK: /ˈwiːli/ WEE-lee) is a residential suburban district in south-west Birmingham, England. The area is part of the Weoley local authority electoral ward, and also comes under the Northfield local council constituency. The suburb of Weoley Castle is bordered by Selly Oak to the east, Harborne to the north, Bartley Green to the west, and Weoley Hill and Shenley Fields to the south.

== Weoley Castle Square ==
Weoley Castle Square is a shopping area at the heart of Weoley Castle. It includes a very large traffic island and during the 1950s prefabricated bungalows of a type known locally as 'prefabs' were on this central island. Today Birmingham City Council maintains the island as a recreation area with benches trees and mown grass. Round the recreation area are a health centre, shops selling economically priced goods and a market. Shops have also been there since at least the 1930s.

== Toponymy ==
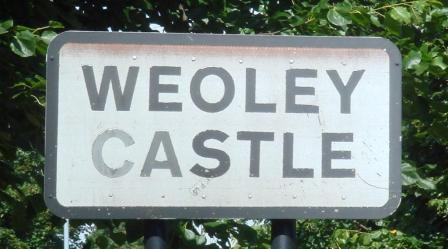
The last of the old district signs for the Weoley Castle area, formerly situated on Shenley Lane (B4121) near to the Weoley Castle public house

The area takes its name from the ruins of a moated and fortified manor house, now owned by Birmingham Museum & Art Gallery. The castle ruins are a Grade II listed building, and the site became a Scheduled Ancient Monument in 1934. The castle's individual name is from the Old English "Wēo-lēah" meaning "temple clearing". Before the Christian era there may have been a heathen temple here.

Between 1960 and 1961 excavations took place at Weoley Castle which unearthed a 13th-century wooden building. The substantial stone remains and the moat can be seen from the viewing platform which is open daily. A recent Heritage Lottery, Birmingham City Council and English Heritage funded project has led to consolidation of the ruins and the creation of a community education centre where schools sessions, community meetings and events are held. The ruins are supported by a volunteer group called the Castle Keepers.

== Amenities ==
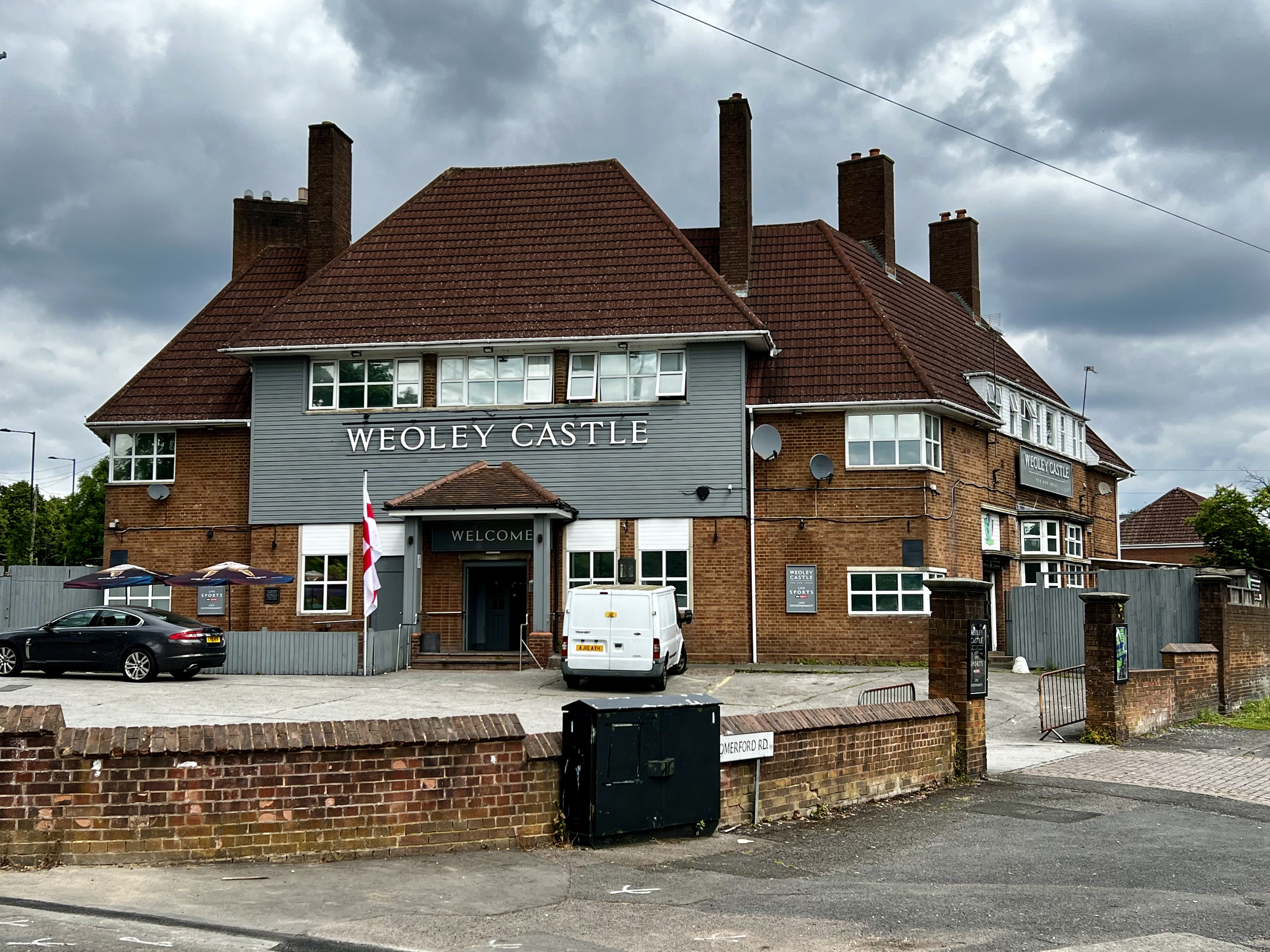
Weoley Castle public house

Mitchells and Butlers were given permission in 1933 to transfer the licence from the Swan with Two Necks, Aston Street, Birmingham (which was scheduled for demolition for a new fire station) to a new Weoley Castle public house to be built at the corner of Somerford Road and Shenley Lane.

A Congregational Church was designed by Birmingham architects Harrison and Tracey and built on Castle Square in 1936. However, this became too costly to maintain, so it was demolished in 1969 to make way for a Fine Fare supermarket and apartments. A replacement, Weoley Castle Community Church was built behind it which opened on 6 June 1970.

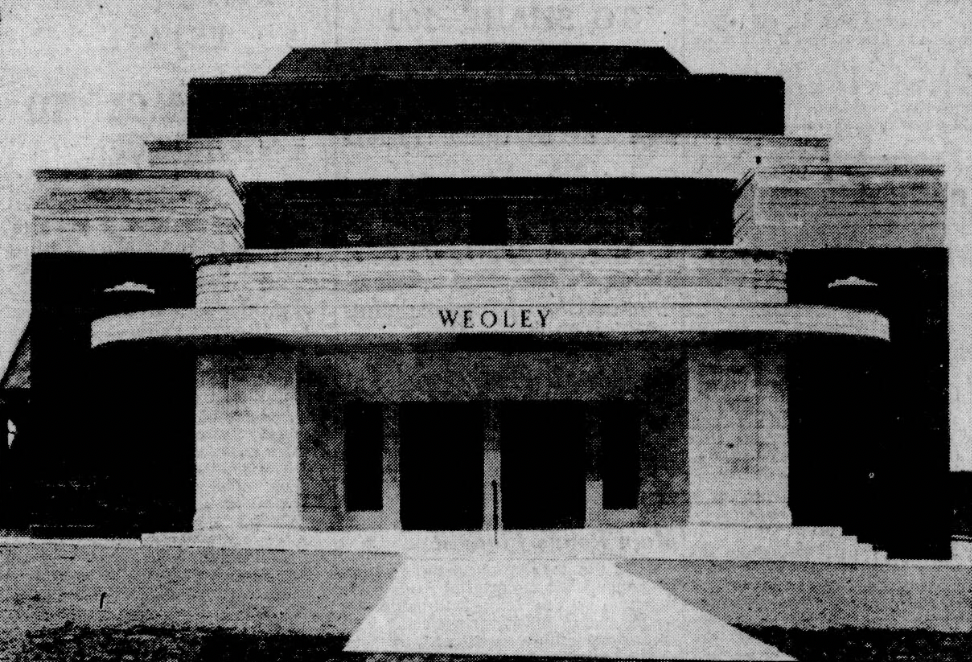
The Weoley Cinema, Barnes Hill, opened in 1936

The Weoley Cinema on Barnes Hill with a seating capacity of 1,000 opened on 1 August 1936. It was designed by the architect H.W. Way Lovegrove LRIBA and the contractors were Hodge Brothers of Northfield. It was closed in the 1960s and demolished.

A temporary library opened in 1952 in the Weoley Hill Community Centre. This temporary arrangement lasted until 1991 when a new purpose-built library was opened at a cost of £750,000. The Library located at Weoley Castle Square serves the district. It includes a local history section, a Pre-school playgroup, drop in advice from Age UK and councillors' surgeries.

Weoley Castle Museum is a visitor attraction that is also located in the suburb. Weoley Castle Walkway is an area of recreation ground that is located mainly within Selly Oak and Quinton. The Lapal Canal is within the grounds and is maintained by the Lapal Canal Trust

== Housing estate ==
Weoley Castle was mostly developed for council housing during the 1930s. Birmingham Corporation purchased the land at Weoley Castle in 1930 in preparation for a new housing estate of 2,718 houses. In March 1931 the corporation advertised the first tender for the erection of 1,200 houses in the Woodbrooke Valley section of the new estate and in April 1932 another tender was advertised for 620 houses on the California Valley West section.

On 23 October 1933 the 40,000th council house in Birmingham was officially opened at 30 Hopstone Road by the later Prime Minister Neville Chamberlain. This made Birmingham the first local authority in Britain to build 40,000 council properties – just 15 years after building its first. The completed Weoley Castle housing estate consisted of nearly 3,000 homes.

== Transport ==
Buses serving Weoley Castle area include:

- 002 Weoley Castle To Merry Hill via Bartley Green, Woodgate, Halesowen & Colley Gate-Diamond Bus
- 39/39A Quinton/Woodgate To Longbridge via Weoley Castle & Northfield - Kev's Coaches
- 48 West Bromwich to Hawkesley via West Heath, Northfield, Weoley Castle, California, Queen Elizabeth Hospital, University Station, Harborne, Bearwood, Warley and Londonderry - National Express West Midlands
- X21 Birmingham to Bartley Green via Five Ways, Birmingham University, Selly Oak and Weoley Castle - National Express West Midlands

== Gallery ==
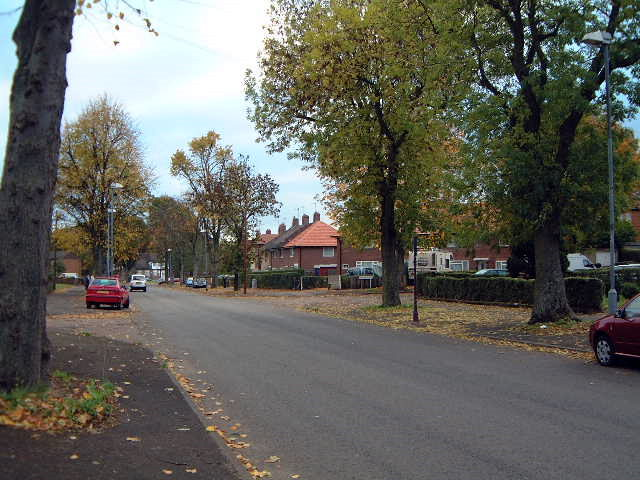
Gregory Avenue in autumn

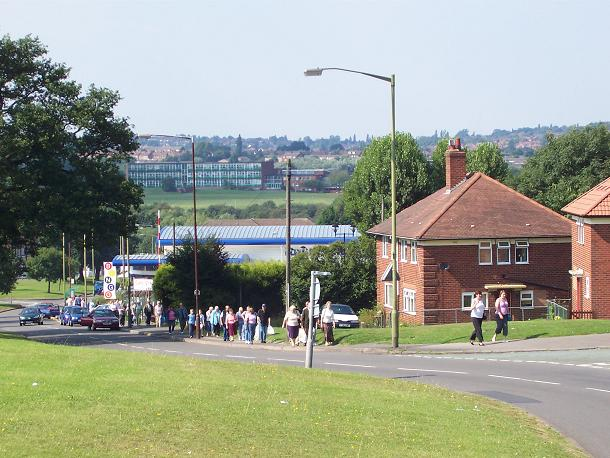
Barnes Hill

== See also ==
- St. Gabriel's Church, Weoley Castle
- Church of Our Lady and St Rose of Lima, Weoley Castle
