= Christ Church, Quinton =

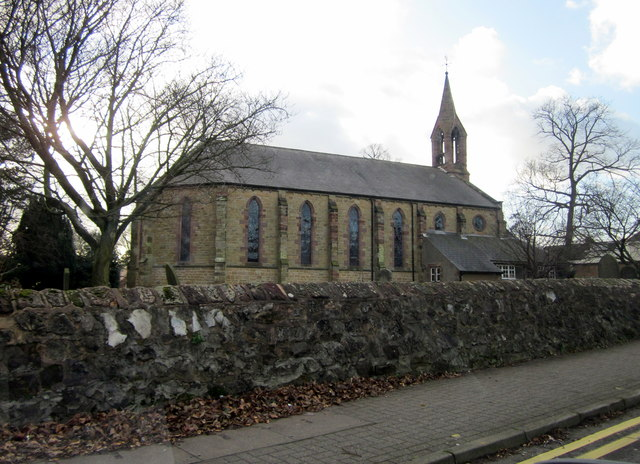
- Christ Church, Quinton
- Christ Church, Quinton
- 52°27′43.04″N 2°00′33.22″W
- OS grid reference: SO 99469 84888
- Location: Quinton, Birmingham
- Country: England
- Denomination: Church of England
- Churchmanship: Open Evangelical
- Website: www.quintonchurch.co.uk

History
- Dedication: Christ

Architecture
- Style: Early English
- Groundbreaking: 1840
- Completed: 1841
- Construction cost: £2,500

Administration
- Diocese: Anglican Diocese of Birmingham
- Archdeaconry: Birmingham
- Deanery: Edgbaston
- Parish: Christ Church at the Quinton

Christ Church, Quinton is a parish church in the Church of England in Quinton, Birmingham.

== History ==
The land for the church was donated by George Lyttelton, 4th Baron Lyttelton, who laid the foundation stone on 19 July 1839. The architect was Richard Hussey. The church and burial ground were consecrated on 18 September 1840 by Dr Robert Carr, the Bishop of Worcester. An ecclesiastical parish was assigned in 1842 from St John the Baptist Church, Halesowen. In 1863 the parish was extended to include parts of Lapal and Hill. Some of the area in the north was transferred into the newly created St Paul's, Blackheath parish in 1869. The church was restored in 1890 by Frank Barlow Osborn and Alfred Reading. The entrance porch was added in 1928.

The churchyard was closed for burials in 1889. 1,415 persons had been buried there since 1840. A new burial ground was consecrated in 1890 by the Bishop of Worcester.

Part of the parish was taken in 1933 to form the parish of St Faith and St Laurence's Church, Harborne.

== Organ ==
A two-manual pipe organ by John Banfield was installed in 1868 but sold to the Waterfall Lane Mission, Old Hill, in 1919. The replacement two-manual organ by J J Binns of Leeds was dedicated in December 1919 and was in use for over 40 years until transferred to the Church of the Epiphany in Corby, Northamptonshire. It was replaced by a redundant cinema organ in January 1963, which in turn was replaced in 1987 by an electronic instrument by Makin of Oldham.
