= Simon Campbell =

British chemist

Sir Simon Campbell CBE FRS FMedSci
- Born: Simon Fraser Campbell; March 27, 1941 (age 85); Lapal, England, United Kingdom
- Education: University of Birmingham (BSc, PhD)
- Awards: CBE; FRS; FMedSci; Honorary DSc
- Scientific career
- Workplaces: Pfizer; Astex
- Thesis: Elimination processes in polyfluorocycloalkanes (1966)

Sir Simon Fraser Campbell (born 27 March 1941) is a British chemist.

== Early life and education ==
Campbell was born on 27 March 1941 in Lapal, England. He obtained a first-class BSc degree in Chemistry in 1962, a PhD degree in 1965, and an honorary DSc degree in 2004 from the University of Birmingham.

== Career ==
Campbell was President of the Royal Society of Chemistry from 2004 to 2006. He led innovative research, discovering some of the world's best-selling prescription drugs, including sildenafil, amlodipine, and doxazosin. He was visiting lecturer at Universidade de São Paulo. and a medicinal chemist for Pfizer. Campbell was also visiting professor at University of Leeds, and served on the advisory board of University of Kent, and University of Bristol.

== Awards and honours ==
Campbell was knighted in the 2015 New Year Honours for services to chemistry, having previously been made a Commander of the Order of the British Empire (CBE). He was elected a Fellow of the Royal Society in 1999 and of the Academy of Medical Sciences in 2003.
