= St Michael and All Angels' Church, Bartley Green =

Coordinates: 52°26′03″N 02°00′13″W

St. Michael and All Angels' Church, Bartley Green
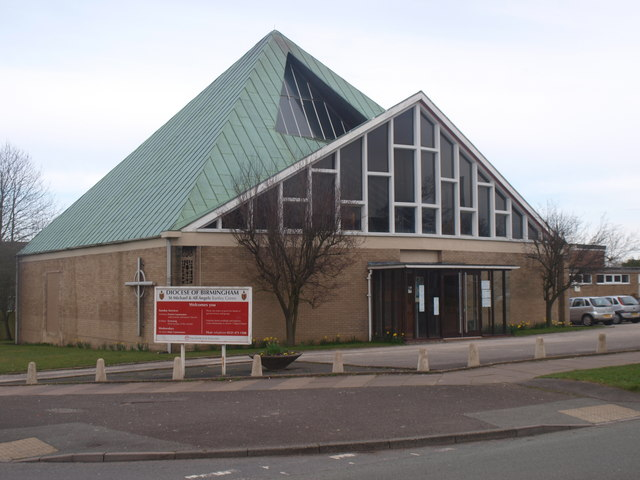
- St. Michael and All Angels' Church, Bartley Green
- Denomination: Church of England
- Churchmanship: Anglo-Catholic
- Website: www.stmichaelandallangelsbartleygreen.wordpress.com

History
- Dedication: St. Michael and All Angels

Administration
- Province: Canterbury
- Diocese: Birmingham
- Parish: Bartley Green

Clergy
- Vicar: The Revd Ruth Atkinson

St. Michael and All Angels' Church, Bartley Green is a parish church in the Church of England located in Bartley Green, Birmingham.

== History ==
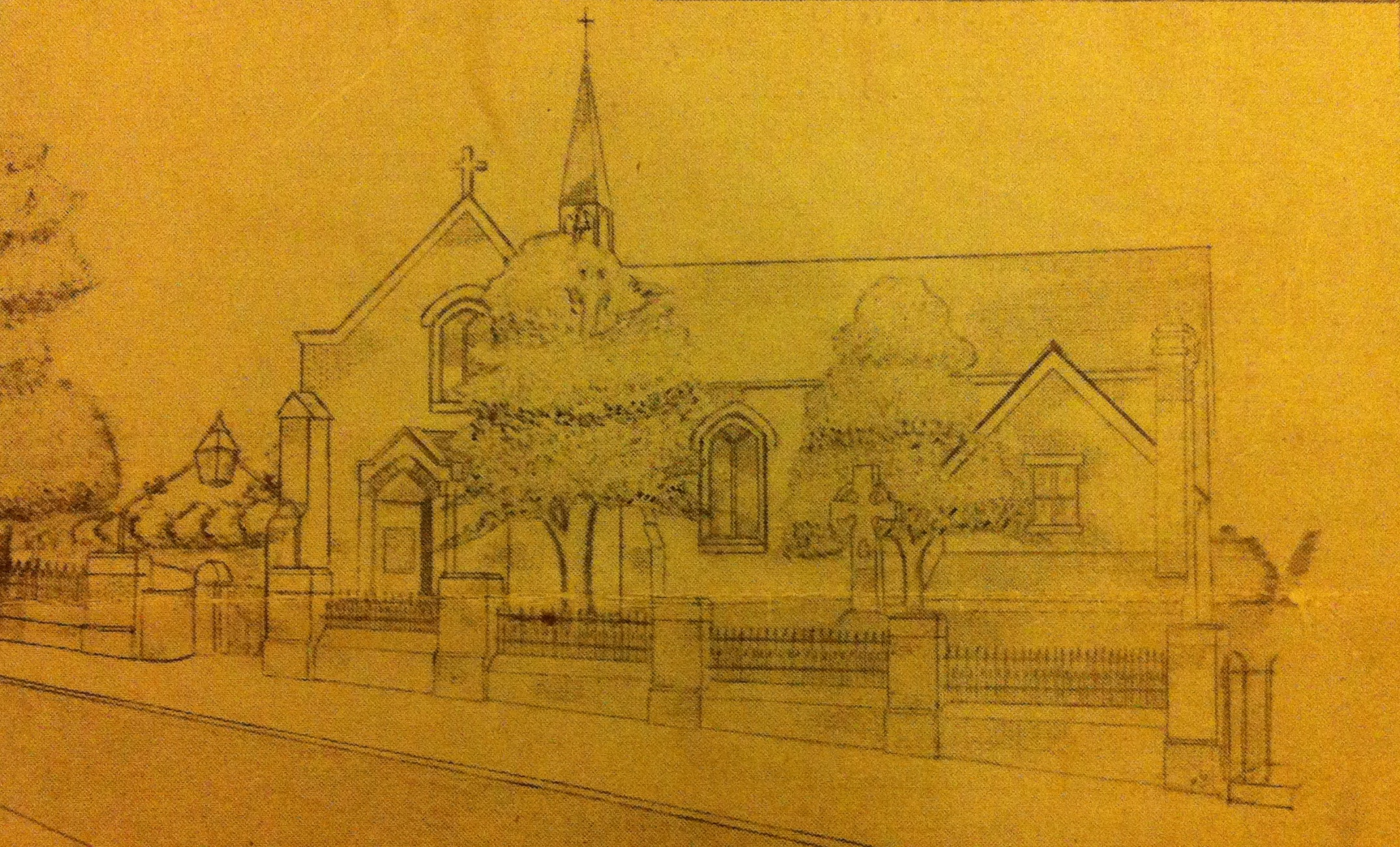
The first church dating from 1840, from a picture in The Parish Messenger, July 1937

St. Michael and All Angels church is located within Bartley Green. It was built as a chapel of ease to St. Laurence, Northfield. Construction of the church commenced in 1838 and was consecrated in 1840. It was by the architect Isaac Newry. At the time it was a small L-shaped, Gothic building. It was enlarged in 1878 with the addition of sanctuary and chancel. In 1933, it became a chapel of ease to St. Gabriel's Church, Weoley Castle. A Conventional district was attached to St. Michael's in 1950, which became a parish in 1966. The church was demolished in 1968 after standing derelict for around two years.

The construction of a new church began in the ward in 1964 and it was consecrated on 12 July 1966 to a design by H Norman Haines of London on Romsley Road.

The church was built opposite the new Bartley Green Shopping Centre. The site was given to the church by the Birmingham Corporation in 1964. In 1977, St Francis Church Centre was constructed in the Glenside area of Bartley Green. They are both part of the Diocese of Birmingham.

St. Michael and All Angels church produced a newsletter named "The Parish Messenger" which recorded the activities of the church. It was published twice a month from 1947 until October 1951 where it was published monthly. Publishing stopped in 1956. The "Bartley Green Pictorial" was first published in September 1967 and existed until 1975. It was then succeeded by the "Bartley Angel" from 1976 to 1981 which in turn was followed by "One Voice" from 1981 to 1988.
