= St Gabriel's Church, Weoley Castle =

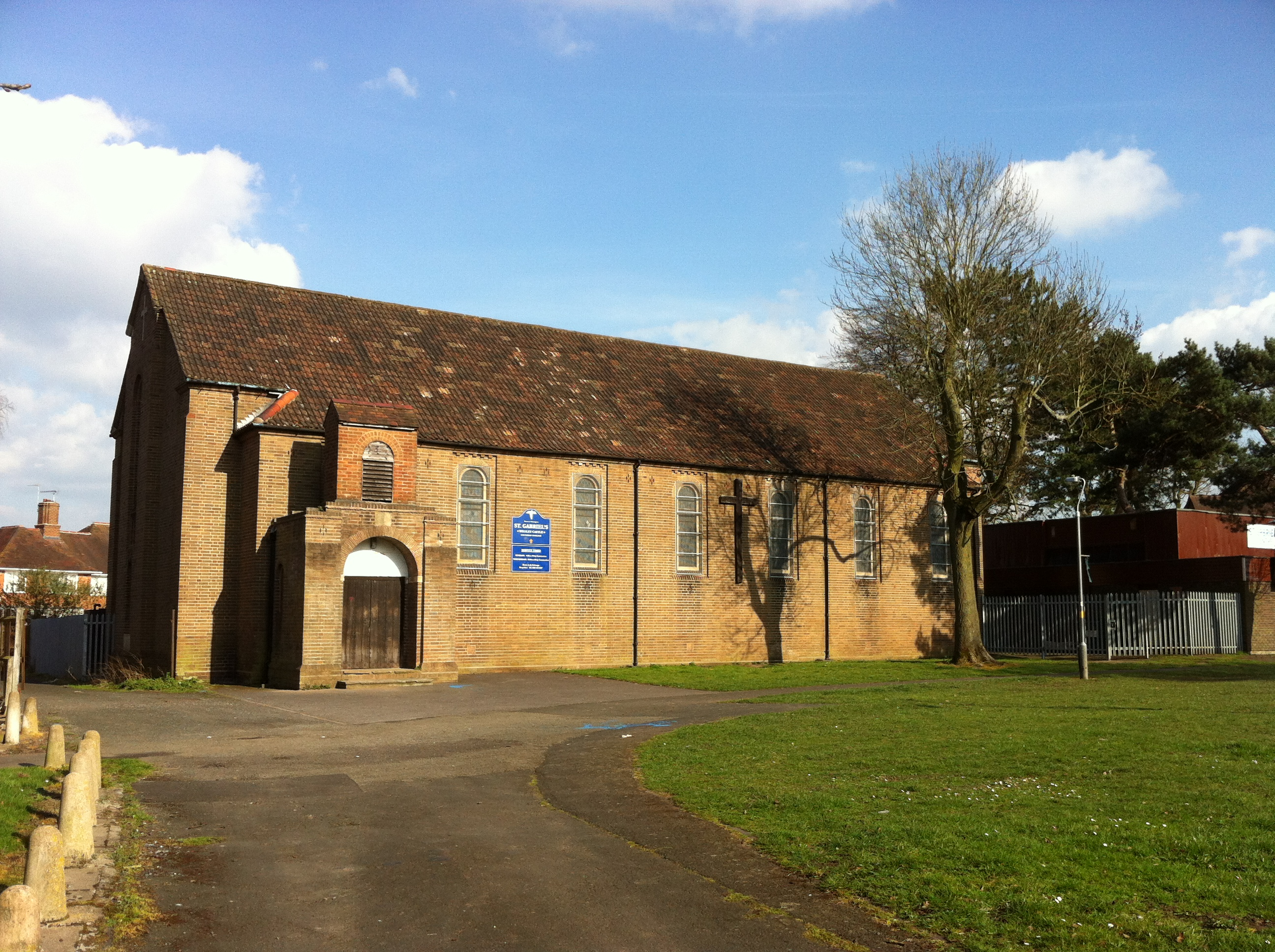
- St Gabriel's Church, Weoley Castle
- St Gabriel's Church, Weoley Castle
- 52°26′07″N 01°58′33″W
- Country: England
- Denomination: Church of England
- Churchmanship: Anglo Catholic
- Website: stgabrielsweoleycastle.com

History
- Dedication: St. Gabriel
- Consecrated: 30 June 1934

Architecture
- Groundbreaking: 10 December 1933

Administration
- Province: Canterbury
- Diocese: Birmingham
- Deanery: Edgbaston
- Benefice: Weoley Castle
- Parish: Weoley Castle

St. Gabriel's Church, Weoley Castle is a parish church in the Church of England located in Weoley Castle, Birmingham.

== History ==
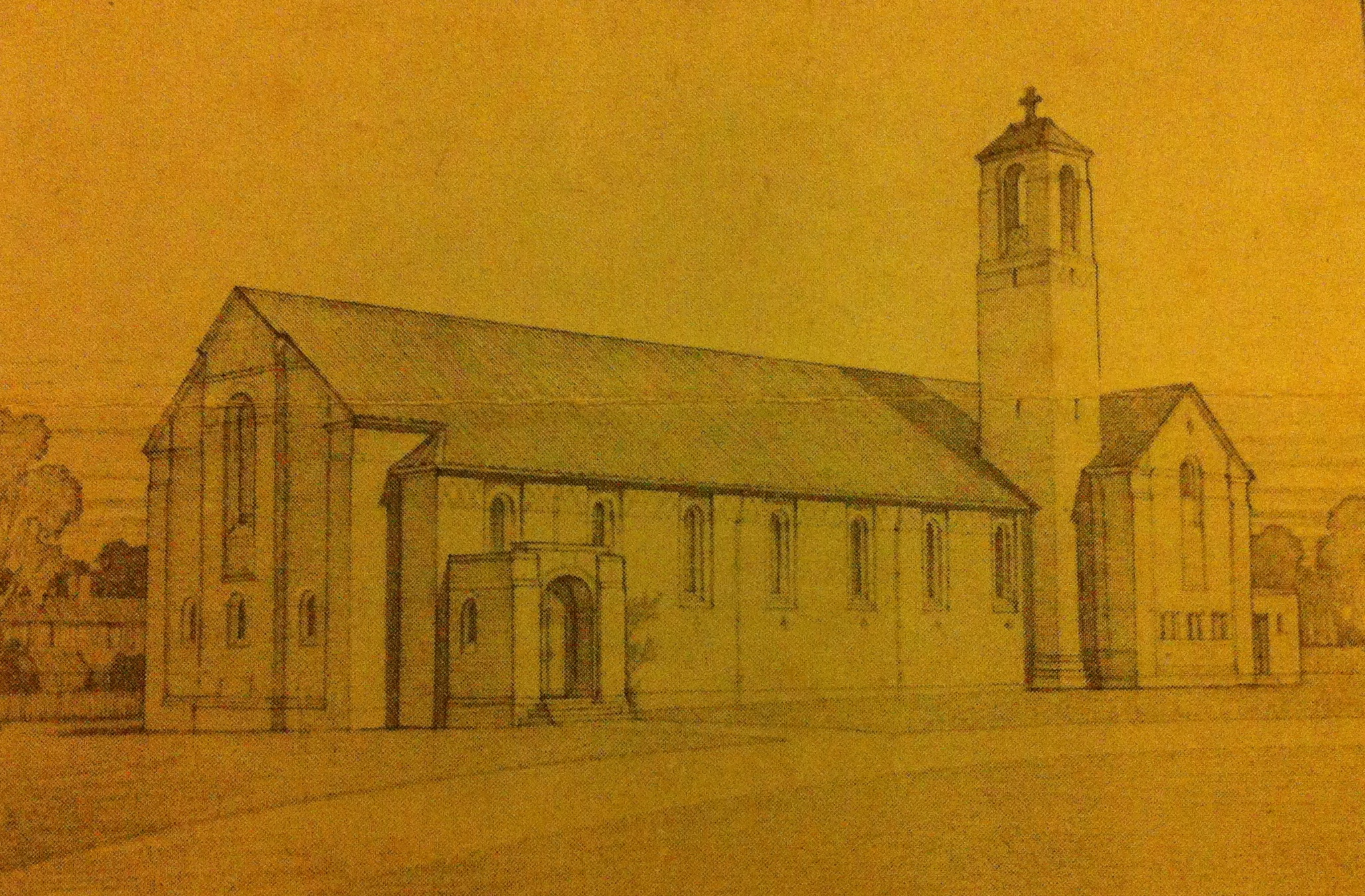
The church as designed by the architect, taken from the Parish Messenger, July 1937

Neville Chamberlain, at the time Chancellor of the Exchequer, laid the foundation stone for the new church on 10 December 1933. It was consecrated by the Bishop of Birmingham E. W. Barnes on 30 June 1934.

The church is by the architect Edwin Francis Reynolds. The original plans included a chancel, transepts and tower, which have not yet been completed. The parish was assigned out of St. Laurence's Church, Northfield and St. Mary's Church, Selly Oak in 1933.

The land was given by James Goddington Ledsam. Originally it was to be called St. Michael and All Angels, Northfield, but it was consecrated on 30 June 1934 as St. Gabriel, Weoley Castle, perhaps to avoid the risk of confusion with St. Michael and All Angels' Church, Bartley Green.

The calvary was sent in 1948 by Ernest William Barnes, Bishop of Birmingham from St John's Church, Deritend and was that parish's memorial of the First World War.

Part of the parish was later transferred to St. David's Church, Shenley Green.

== Organ ==
The church has an historic organ dating from 1777 by John Snetzler which was originally located in St. James' Church, Wednesbury and then St. Andrew's Church, West Bromwich. It was moved here in 1940. A specification of the organ can be found on the National Pipe Organ Register.
