= Woodgate Valley Country Park =

Country park in Birmingham, UK

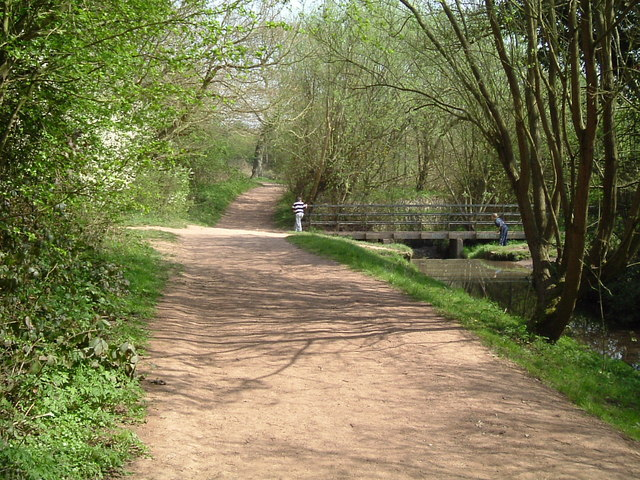
- Path and bridge
- Interactive map of Woodgate Valley Country Park
- Location: Bartley Green/Quinton, Birmingham, England
- Coordinates: 52°26′53″N 1°59′46″W
- Area: 450 acres (180 ha)
- Operator: Birmingham City Council

Woodgate Valley Country Park is a country park within the Bartley Green and Quinton districts of Birmingham. It is the third largest Birmingham Country Park after Sutton Park and Lickey Hills Country Park. The park is maintained as a wildlife habitat but also has farm animals.

== History ==
The Country Park was set up in 1984, having previously been rural land with smallholdings and larger farms. The farms were in the ownership of Birmingham Corporation by 1953 but public access was not allowed in order to protect crops and livestock. Paul Cadbury mooted the idea of opening up the valley by providing marked trails for walkers, tracks for horseriding and stabling for horses, picnic sites and car parking. He also proposed damming a section of the Bourn Brook for fishing and allowing children freedom to paddle in the shallows. The city council's Parks Committee viewed the proposal favourably but said there was a problem financing the necessary fencing. In response chocolate firm Cadbury's, of which Paul Cadbury was vice-chairman and managing director offered to donate £3,500 towards the cost. In July 1956, the Public Works Committee unanimously decided not to build on the Woodgate Valley. A decade later the Council put forward a proposal to develop 150 acres of the 600-acre Woodgate Valley farmland for 2,000 homes. By 1976, on the northern side of the valley the Simmonds Drive/Highfield Lane housing development had been built and on the southern side had arisen the South Woodgate estate of mixed council and private housing. All the Birmingham Corporation farms disappeared, though Hole Farm is remembered in the name of a horse riding and trekking centre.

The park comprises some 450 acres (180 ha) and is on land previously threatened by urban development. The disused Lapal Tunnel of the Dudley No 2 canal passes just south of Hole Farm, north of the visitor centre and on through the South Woodgate housing estate. The tunnel opened in 1798 and was closed to traffic in 1926. Spoil heaps provide visible reminders of the tunnel's construction.

== Wild life ==
The park is maintained with varied wild life habitats. There are hedgerows, meadows and woodland, plus Bourn Brook. More than 80 species of bird, including marsh harrier, long-eared owl and kingfisher; and 250 species of plants including common bluebells, foxgloves and honeysuckle, have been recorded, as have butterflies and various species of dragonflies including red admiral and small tortoiseshell. Many plants grow in the damp meadows. In 2008 muntjac deer were sighted by local residents.

== Facilities ==
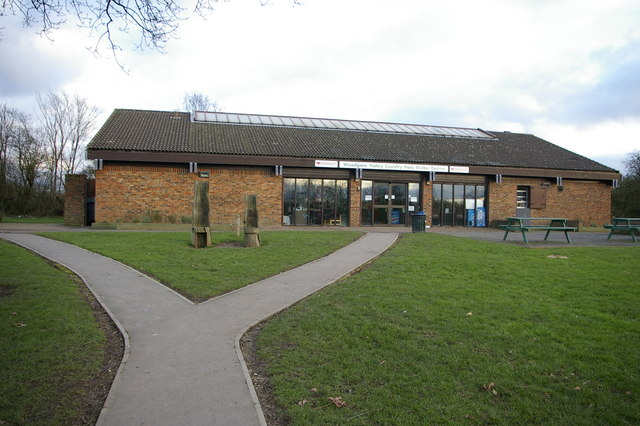
The visitor centre

Woodgate Valley Country Park stretches for about 1.3 miles (2.1 km) along the line of the Bourne Brook, from Woodgate on the city's western boundary to the B4121 road between Quinton and California. Visitors go for a leisurely walk, observe wildlife, walk the dog or ride horses and get away from the noise, traffic and buildings of the city. A parkrun has been held in the Country Park since August 2021, with 100-200 runners typically participating every Saturday morning.

Woodgate Valley Urban Farm exists as a self-supporting private charitable company. The adjacent Hole Farm Trekking Centre is run by the City Council and caters for horse riding across a range of ages and abilities. Rangers based in the Visitor Centre provide recreational and educational activities such as a wild food walk. The Visitor Centre has a café and information displays, and a play area for children and picnic area are just outside.

National Express West Midlands bus route no. 23 stops near the main entrance on Clapgate Lane.
