= Bartley Green School =

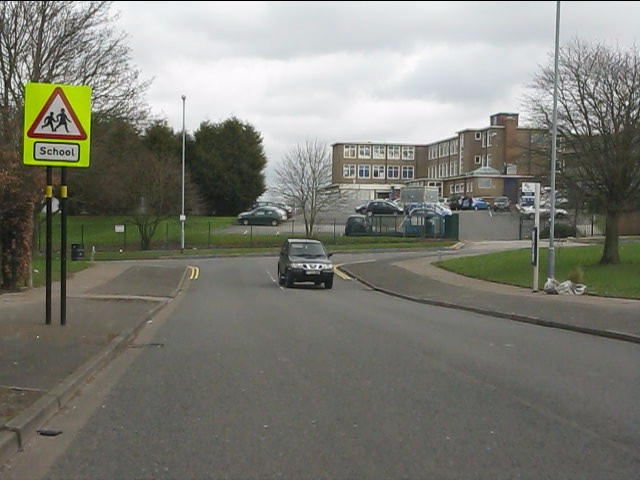

Location
- Adams Hill, Bartley Green; Birmingham, West Midlands, B32 3QJ; England
- 52°26′15″N 1°59′59″W

Information
- Type: Academy
- Local authority: Birmingham
- Specialist: Technology and Sport
- Department for Education URN: 136589 Tables
- Ofsted: Reports
- Headteacher: Jane Chan
- Gender: Mixed
- Age: 11 to 16
- Enrolment: 904
- Website: http://www.bartleygreen.org.uk/

Bartley Green School is an academy with Technology and Sports College status for pupils aged 11–16 in the Bartley Green area of Birmingham, England.

The school has approximately 900 pupils. The school comprises largely White British ethnic origin, with a small number of Black, Asian and mixed heritage backgrounds. The school has a higher-than-average proportion of students with special educations needs because the school has a unit for 55 students with speech and language difficulties, including autism spectrum disorders. The numeracy and literacy skills of pupils upon entry into the school in year 7 are below average.

The school has gained a range of awards, including Artsmark Silver, Sports and Information and Communication Technology (ICT) marks, Investor in People and Healthy Schools accreditation.

== Notable alumni ==
- Kelli Ali (b. 1975) - Musician and Artist
- Mark Rees (b. 1962) - Professional Footballer
