= Hillcrest School, Birmingham =

Hillcrest School

Location
- Stonehouse Lane; Bartley Green; Birmingham, West Midlands, B32 3AE; England; 52.4456°N 1.9819°W

Information
- Type: Academy
- Established: 7 September 1954
- Local authority: Birmingham City Council
- Department for Education URN: 137346 Tables
- Ofsted: Reports
- Headteacher: Samuel B Abbotts
- Gender: Girls (Mixed sixth form)
- Age: 11 to 18
- Enrolment: 518 as of March 2016
- Website: http://hillcrest.bham.sch.uk/

Hillcrest School is a secondary school for girls (and mixed sixth form) in the California area of Bartley Green, Birmingham, in the West Midlands of England.

== History ==
It was established as Bartley Green Grammar School for Girls on 7 September 1954, although the official opening by Sir Wilfred Martineau did not take place until 13 July 1955. The sixth form was opened by the end of the 1950s. The school was considerably extended and expanded in the 1970s to accommodate with the increase in pupil intake.

The school was renamed Hillcrest School in September 1983 and became a comprehensive school. Boys were allowed to join the sixth form during the 1980s. Following further work at the school in 1998, the school became a Certified Cisco Networking Academy in 1999. The school also became a specialist Maths and Computing College.

Previously a community school administered by Birmingham City Council, Hillcrest School converted to academy status in June 2013. However the school continues to coordinate with Birmingham City Council for admissions. In 2013 Ofsted rated the school as 'good' with 'outstanding behaviour and safety'.

== Academics ==
Hillcrest School GCSEs and BTECs as programmes of study for girls, while students in the sixth form have the option to study from a range of A-levels and further BTECs. The sixth form provision is offered as part of the Oaks Sixth Form College, a consortium of 7 secondary schools in South-West Birmingham.

== Notable former pupils ==
=== Bartley Green Grammar School for Girls ===
- Lynne Jones, Labour Party politician
