= Dudley Canal =

Canal in the West Midlands, England

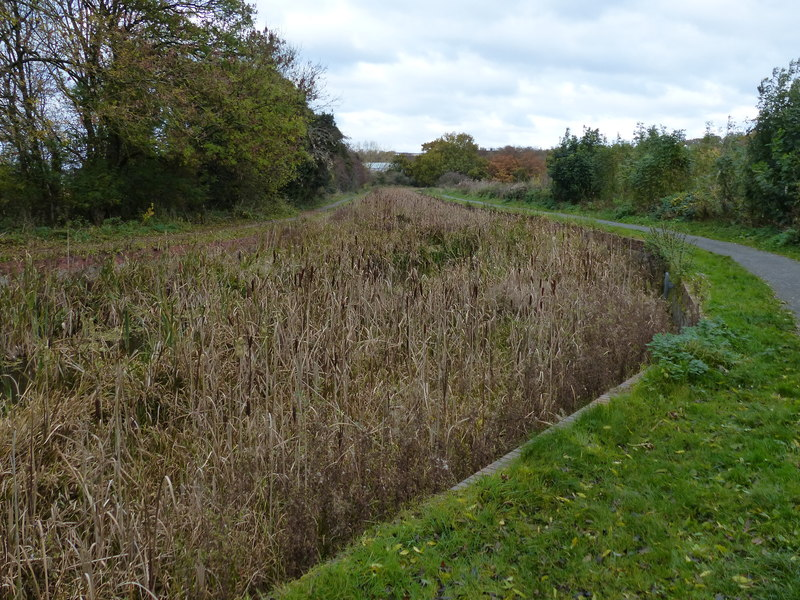
- Overgrown section of the No. 2 Line near Hawne Basin
- Interactive map of Dudley Canal

Specifications
- Locks: 12 (originally 14)
- Status: part navigable
- Navigation authority: Canal and River Trust

History
- Original owner: Dudley Canal Company
- Date of act: 1776

Geography
- Connects to: Birmingham Canal Navigations

The Dudley Canal is a canal passing through Dudley in the West Midlands of England. The canal is part of the English and Welsh network of connected navigable inland waterways and forms part of the popular Stourport Ring narrowboat cruising route.

The first short section, which connected to the Stourbridge Canal, opened in 1779. This was then connected to the Birmingham Canal system in 1792 via Dudley Tunnel. Almost immediately, work started on an extension, called Line No. 2, which ran through another long tunnel at Lapal to reach the Worcester and Birmingham Canal. This was completed in 1798 but significant trade had to wait until the Worcester and Birmingham was completed in 1802. In 1846, the company amalgamated with the Birmingham Canal Navigations and various improvements followed including the Netherton Tunnel. This was of a similar length to and parallel to the Dudley Tunnel but it was much bigger with towpaths on both sides and gas lighting. It was the last canal tunnel built in England.

Subsidence from coal mining was a significant problem for much of the life of the canal. The Lapal Tunnel was regularly affected and a section near Blackbrook Junction fell into mine workings in 1894. The route was restored but the short Two Locks Line nearby was abandoned in 1909 and the Lapal Tunnel suffered the same fate in 1917. Most of rest of the canal was abandoned in the 1960s but a committee was formed, later becoming the Dudley Canal Trust, and restoration took place culminating in the reopening of Dudley Tunnel in 1973. Lapal Tunnel remains closed and although the Lapal Canal Trust originally campaigned for it to be reopened, they have modified their plans to include a surface route following the conclusion of an engineering study.

== History ==
Dudley Canal Act 1776
- Act of Parliament
- Parliament of Great Britain
- Long title: An Act for making and maintaining a Navigable Canal within and from certain Lands belonging to Thomas Talbot Foley Esquire, in the Parish of Dudley, in the County of Worcester, to join and communicate with the Stourbridge Navigation at a Place called Black Delph, upon Pensnet Chace, in the Parish of Kingswinford, in the County of Stafford.
- Citation: 16 Geo. 3. c. 66
- Territorial extent: Great Britain

Dates
- Royal assent: 2 April 1776
- Commencement: 26 October 1775 (Note: Start of session.)
- Repealed: 27 July 1846
Other legislation
Repealed by	Birmingham and Dudley Canal Consolidation Act 1846
Relates to	Dudley Canal Act 1785; Selly Oak Canal Act 1793; Dudley Canal Act 1796

Status: Repealed

Text of statute as originally enacted

The Dudley Canal was seen as part of a scheme to transport coal from coalfields near Dudley to Stourbridge where it would be used for industry. Limestone and ironstone were other potential cargos. A meeting was held in Stourbridge in February 1775 at which Robert Whitworth was commissioned to survey a route and the whole cost of the project was promised. The principal promoter was Lord Dudley and the route ran from Dudley to Stourton on the Staffordshire and Worcestershire. A bill was placed before Parliament in the spring but there was opposition from the Birmingham Canal Company and the promoters withdrew it. They then presented separate bills for the Stourbridge Canal and the Dudley Canal, both of which became acts of Parliament on 2 April 1776, the Stourbridge Canal Act 1776 (16 Geo. 3. c. 28) and the Dudley Canal Act 1776 (16 Geo. 3. c. 66). They passed despite further opposition from the Birmingham Canal Company. The junction between the Dudley canal and the Stourbridge canal was at the foot of the nine-lock Black Delph flight.

Thomas Dadford, Sr. was engaged as the engineer and surveyor and acted in this capacity until 1783 after which he was employed more informally. The Dudley Canal Act 1796 allowed the Dudley Canal Company to raise £7,000 and this had been subscribed by July 1778 but was insufficient to finance the work. The company continued to call money on the shares and raised £9,200 in this way with each £100 share being worth £128. Construction work was completed by 24 June 1779, apart from a water supply reservoir at Pensnett Chase, although little traffic used the canal until the Stourbridge Canal was completed in December of that year. As built, the canal terminated at two basins at Great Ox Leasow and Little Ox Leasow, both built on land owned by T. T. Foley, one of the main shareholders.

=== Dudley Tunnel ===
Dudley Canal Act 1785
- Act of Parliament
- Parliament of the United Kingdom
- Long title: An Act for extending the Dudley Canal to the Birmingham Canal, at or near Tipton Green in the County of Stafford.
- Citation: 25 Geo. 3. c. 87
- Territorial extent: Great Britain

Dates
- Royal assent: 4 July 1785
- Commencement: 25 January 1785
- Repealed: 27 July 1846
Other legislation
Amended by	Birmingham Canal Navigations Act 1835
Repealed by	Birmingham and Dudley Canal Consolidation Act 1846
Relates to	Dudley Canal Act 1776; Selly Oak Canal Act 1793; Dudley Canal Act 1796

Status: Repealed

Text of statute as originally enacted

In 1784, the Stourbridge and Dudley companies approached the Birmingham Canal about a junction. This would involve building extra locks at Park Head and a tunnel which would link to Lord Dudley's existing mining tunnel which joined the Birmingham Canal at Tipton. The Birmingham Canal Company agreed but imposed heavy tolls on traffic using the junction to compensate for the loss of revenue of goods which would formerly have travelled via Aldersley Junction. Lord Dudley agreed to sell his tunnel to the Dudley Canal Company but never received any payment as the beneficial tolls and usefulness of the new canal were deemed to be adequate compensation. An act of Parliament, the Dudley Canal Act 1785 (25 Geo. 3. c. 87), was obtained in July 1785 to authorise the work which had been surveyed by John Snape and John Bull and checked by Dadford, who then became consulting engineer. Abraham Lees was the on-site engineering manager and the main contract for the tunnel went to John Pinkerton. Its width was to be 9.25 feet (2.82 m) with 7 feet (2.1 m) of headroom and 5.5 feet (1.7 m) of water. The contract specified that it should be finished by 25 March 1788. In 1787, Pinkerton's work was thought to be unsatisfactory and work stopped while arguments took place. Dadford was paid off, Pinkerton had to pay half of his £4,000 bond and work restarted with Isaac Pratt in charge. He was a member of both the Stourbridge and the Dudley canal company committees. Lees retained his position.

In May 1789, there were further issues when it was discovered that the tunnel was not straight. Pratt resigned, and Josiah Clowes was engaged to complete the project. He finished the tunnel, built a new junction with the Birmingham Canal at Tipton and a reservoir at Gad's Green. Completion was announced at a shareholder's meeting on 25 June 1792, and the official opening was on 15 October.

=== Line No. 2 ===
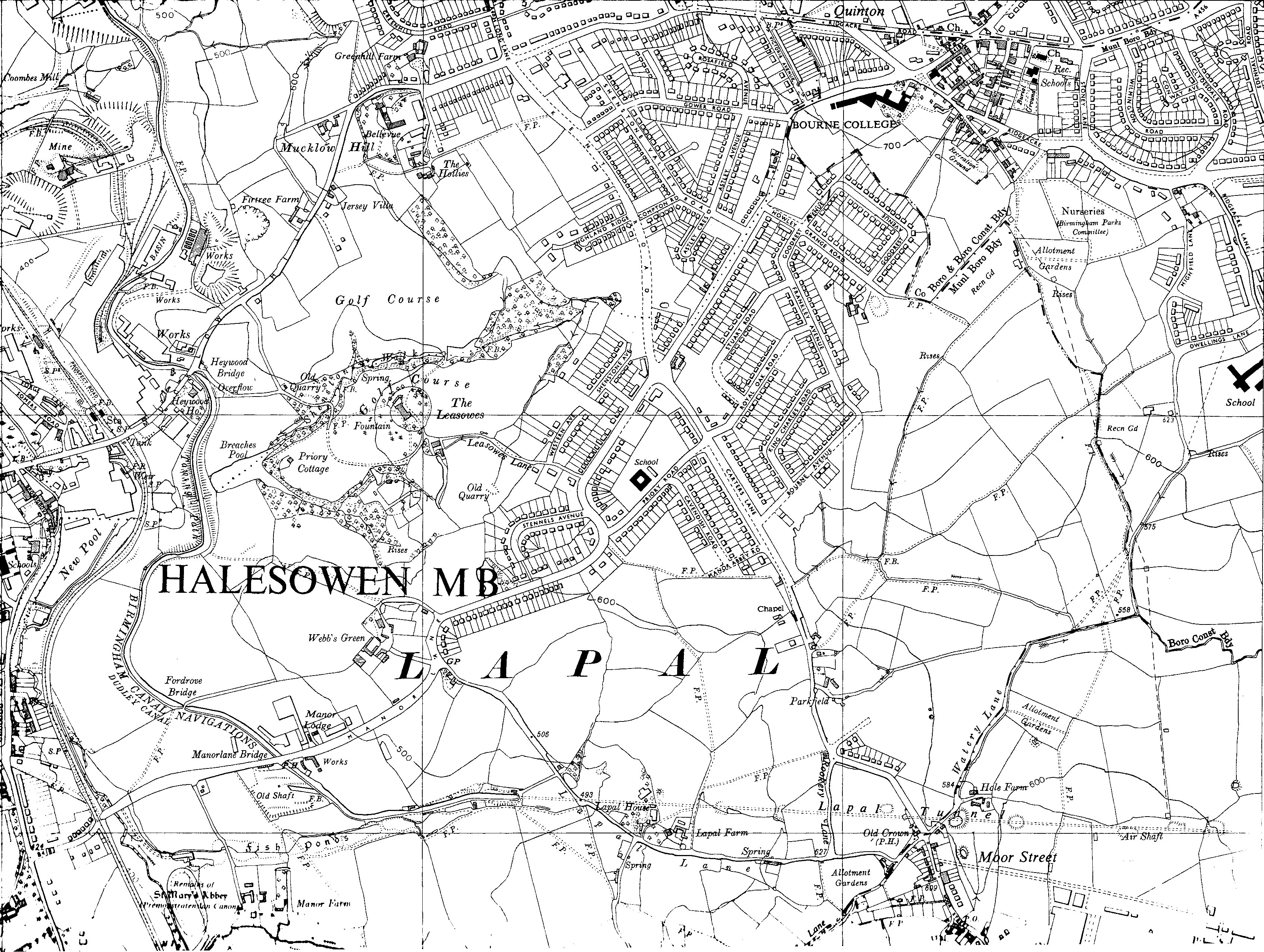
1955 Ordnance Survey map of the west portal of Lapal Tunnel, the western dry section, and the last half mile of navigable canal (entering from the top)

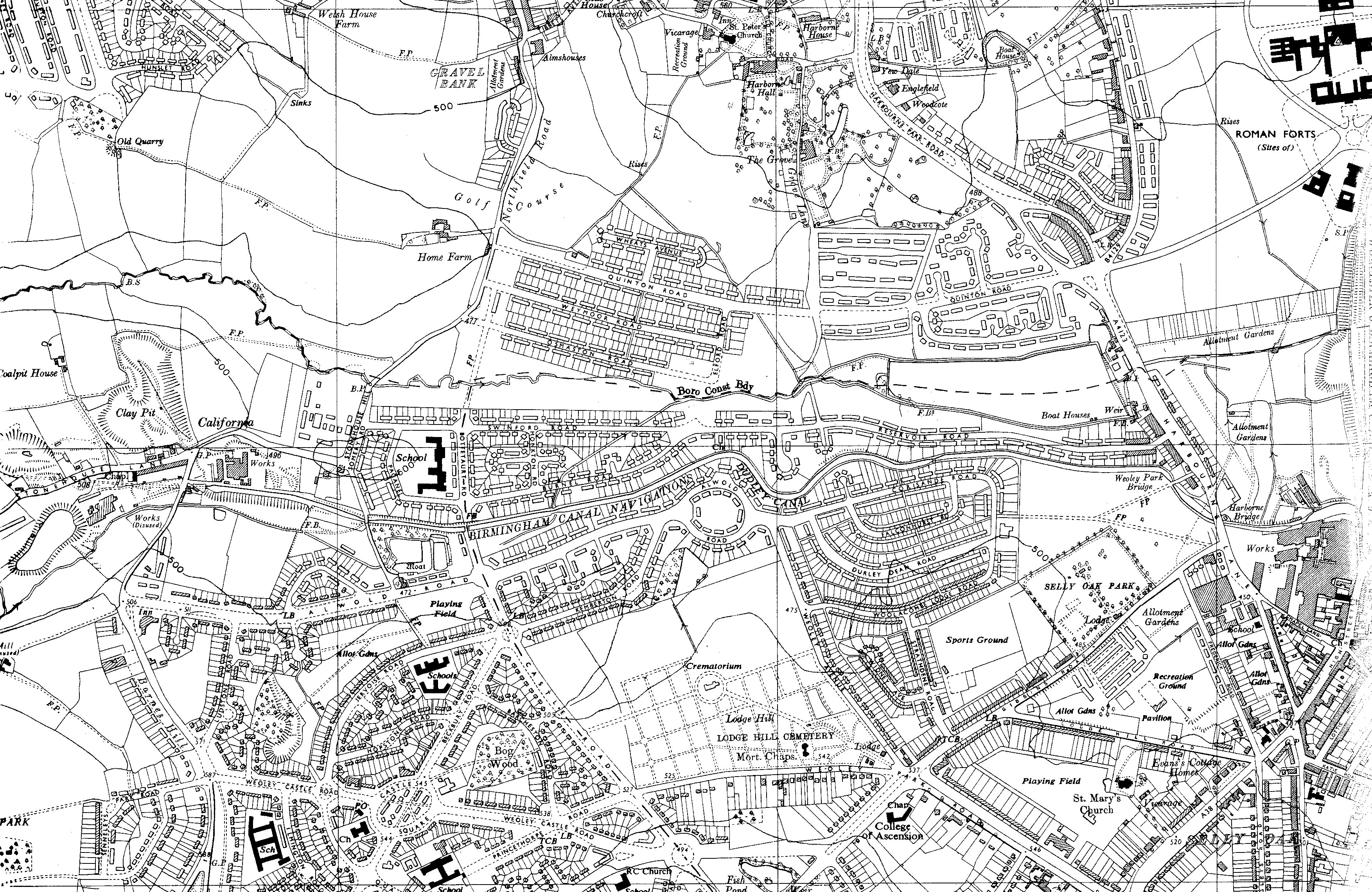
1955 Ordnance Survey map of the east portal of Lapal Tunnel and dry canal to Selly Oak Junction

Selly Oak Canal Act 1793
- Act of Parliament
- Parliament of the United Kingdom
- Long title: An Act for making and maintaining a Navigable Canal from the Dudley Canal, in the County of Worcester, to the Worcester and Birmingham Canal now making at or near Selly Oak, in the said County; and also certain Collateral Cuts to communicate therewith.
- Citation: 33 Geo. 3. c. 121
- Territorial extent: Great Britain

Dates
- Royal assent: 17 June 1793
- Commencement: 17 June 1793 (Note: The Acts of Parliament (Commencement) Act 1793.)
- Repealed: 27 July 1846
Other legislation
Repealed by	Birmingham and Dudley Canal Consolidation Act 1846
Relates to	Dudley Canal Act 1776; Dudley Canal Act 1785; Dudley Canal Act 1796

Status: Repealed

Text of statute as originally enacted

With the Dudley Tunnel just finished, a meeting was held in Birmingham on 31 August 1792 at which a canal from Birmingham to serve the collieries at Netherton was proposed. The following day, the Dudley Canal Company proposed their own version of a similar canal and following meetings with the Worcester and Birmingham Canal, whose line it would join, it was agreed that those who had been at the meeting would raise £61,500 and that the remaining £28,500 required would be subscribed by existing Dudley shareholders. The line would be constructed at the same level as the Dudley Canal at Park Head.

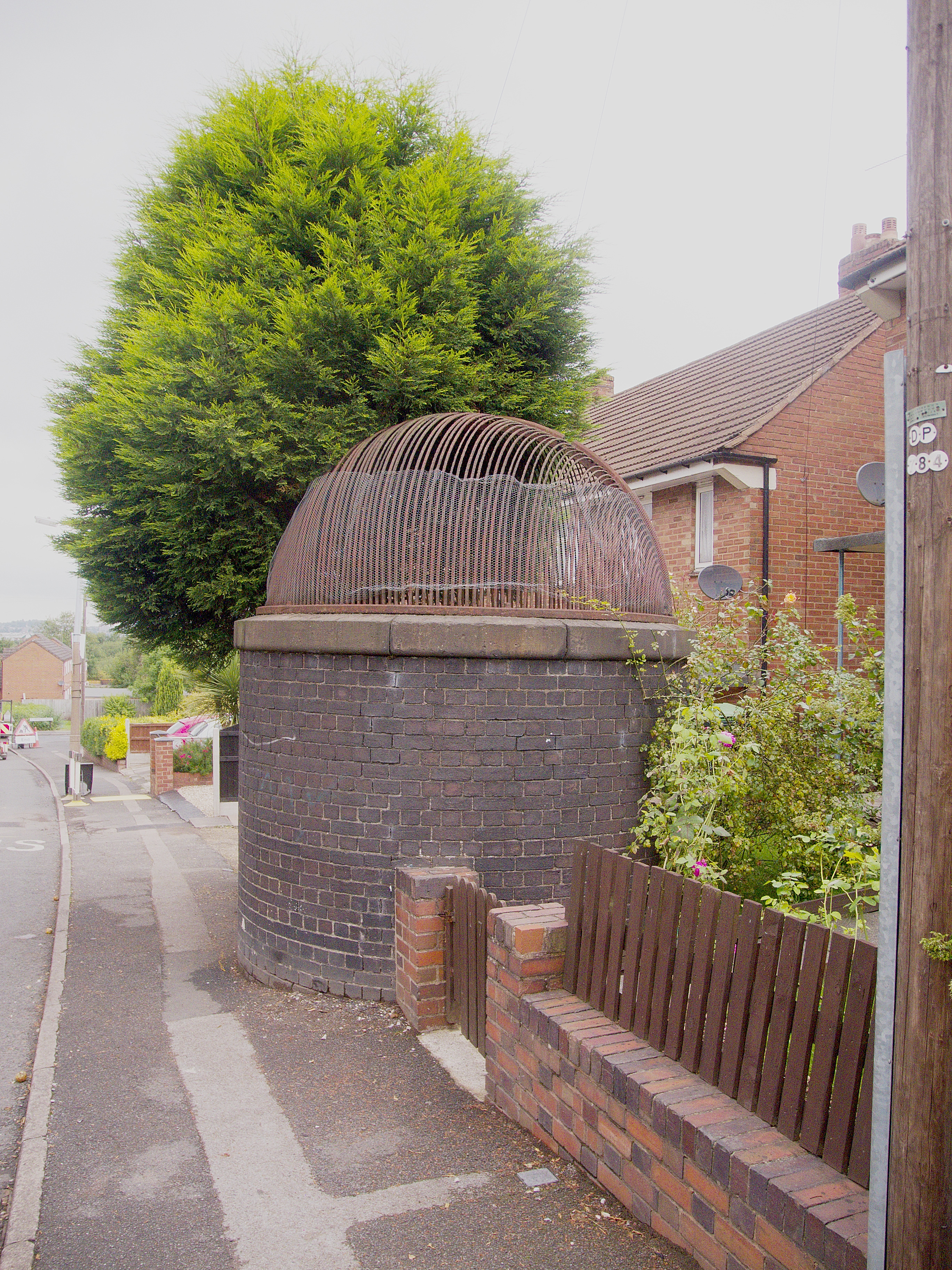
Top of the Gosty Hill Tunnel ventilation shaft, in the front garden of a house (of much later construction) in Station Road, Old Hill

A tunnel of 3,795 yards (3,470 m) would be required at Lapal and a shorter one of 537 yards (491 m) at Gosty Hill. Another short tunnel was to be built at Halesowen but became a cutting and bridge when work began. The length of the canal was to be 10.8 miles (17.4 km), for which the working capital would be £90,000 with an additional £40,000 if required. John Snape carried out a survey and despite opposition from the Birmingham Canal, the Staffordshire and Worcestershire Canal and a contingent of iron foundries in Wolverhampton, an act of Parliament, the Selly Oak Canal Act 1793 (33 Geo. 3. c. 121), was obtained in 1793. The Stratford-upon-Avon Canal was authorised soon afterwards which would provide a connection to London.

The original route was renamed "Line no 1" to distinguish it from the new "Line no 2" which linked the canal at Park Head Junction, near Netherton, to the Worcester and Birmingham Canal at Selly Oak, Birmingham via Halesowen and the tunnel at Lapal. Work began in early 1794 with Josiah Clowes as engineer and William Underhill as resident engineer. Clowes died in early 1796 and Underhill managed the whole project for a year after which Robert Whitworth carried out an inspection. He was satisfied and Underhill continued to manage the construction of the tunnel and an aqueduct near the junction with the No.1 Line while management of the rest of the project was handled by Benjamin Timmins. The section from Netherton to Halesowen had been built about 1 foot (0.30 m) too high but this was rectified and the wharf at Halesowen opened for business in early 1797.

Dudley Canal Act 1796
- Act of Parliament
- Parliament of Great Britain
- Long title: An act to enable the company of proprietors of the Dudley canal navigation, to raise a further sum of money for completing the said navigation; and for amending the several acts relating thereto.
- Citation: 37 Geo. 3. c. 13

Dates
- Royal assent: 23 December 1796
- Commencement: 23 December 1796
- Repealed: 27 July 1846
Other legislation
Repealed by	Birmingham and Dudley Canal Consolidation Act 1846
Relates to	Dudley Canal Act 1776; Dudley Canal Act 1785; Selly Oak Canal Act 1793

Status: Repealed

Text of statute as originally enacted

Tunnelling proved difficult. Thirty shafts were dug, to provide multiple work faces, but much of the route was through sand and large quantities of water had to be pumped out of the workings using three steam engines. The £90,000 had been spent by May 1796 and additional calls on the shares were used to raise the extra £40,000 authorised. Another act of Parliament, the Dudley Canal Act 1796 (37 Geo. 3. c. 13) was obtained in December 1796 to authorise a further £40,000 and by the time the new route was completed on 28 May 1798, a total of £162.50 had been called on each £100 share. The original shares were worth £118.75 and financial matters were simplified by issuing additional shares so that they all had a nominal value of £100. Lord Dudley resigned from the committee at this point, having steered the company through twenty-two year of construction. The working capital had risen from just £7,000 to over £200,000 in this period and no dividends had been paid. Traffic through the new tunnel was meagre until 1802 when the Stratford Canal provided a link to the Warwick and Birmingham Canal (later the Grand Union Canal) and hence to London. The first dividend was paid in 1804 and although dividends were never high, they averaged around 4 per cent between 1826 and 1844.

=== Development ===
Dudley Tunnel was popular with tourists and was mentioned in guides to Dudley Castle written by the Rev. Luke Booker in 1825 and W. Harris in 1845. There were complaints that the tunnel was often blocked by unattended limestone boats but this problem seems to have been resolved by 1799 although there is no mention of how this was achieved. The tunnel was also affected by subsidence from local coal mining and was regularly closed to allow repairs to be made. Working a loaded boat through the tunnel took about 4 hours and this caused congestion. Various ways were considered to alleviate this, including rope haulage in 1840, but the cost of £6,000 was deemed to be too expensive. Subsidence in the Lapal tunnel was worse and it was closed twice in 1801 and for four months in 1805.

Incentives to aid passage through the Lapal Tunnel began in 1820. Any boat carrying over 15 tons could claim one shilling and sixpence (7.5p) for hiring extra leggers. This was increased to three shillings (15p) in 1829 providing the boat was carrying 18 tons. In 1841, the superintendent of the canal, Thomas Brewin, devised a scheme which used a steam pumping engine and stop locks at either end of the tunnel to create a flow which assisted the movement of the boats. This proved successful for it continued to be used until 1914 and Brewin was awarded plate worth £50 in recognition of his contribution. In 1838, a 400-yard (370 m) cut was made at Lodge Farm to divert the canal and make room for a storage reservoir and pumping engine and the short Withymoor branch was built in 1842.

Birmingham and Dudley Canal Consolidation Act 1846
- Act of Parliament
- Parliament of the United Kingdom
- Long title: An Act for consolidating the Dudley Canal Navigation with the Birmingham Canal Navigations; and for other Purposes.
- Citation: 9 & 10 Vict. c. cclxix
- Territorial extent: United Kingdom

Dates
- Royal assent: 27 July 1846
Other legislation
Amends	Birmingham Canal Navigations Act 1835; Wyrley and Essington Canal Navigation Act 1840
Repeals/revokes	Dudley Canal Act 1776; Dudley Canal Act 1785; Stourbridge and Birmingham and Fazeley Canal Act 1790; Selly Oak Canal Act 1793; Dudley Canal Act 1796

In 1813, the Birmingham Canal had suggested amalgamation with the Dudley Canal as a way to prevent continued reductions in tolls but no action was taken. In 1845, with a number of railway schemes threatening the profitability of the canal, a new approach from the Birmingham Canal Navigations was viewed more favourably and a merger was agreed on 8 October 1845. An act of Parliament to authorise it, the Birmingham and Dudley Canal Consolidation Act 1846 (9 & 10 Vict. c. cclxix), was obtained in the following year and the Dudley Canal ceased to be an independent concern on 27 July 1846.

The Birmingham Canal Navigations carried out a number of improvements in the 1850s. Building of Netherton Tunnel was begun on 31 December 1855 and completed on 20 August 1858. It was the last canal tunnel to be built in England and compared to the Dudley Tunnel, it was huge, being around 27 feet (8.2 m) from side to side at water level with a towpath on both sides. It was found necessary to build an invert through the tunnel because of unstable ground caused by mining below its line and large retaining walls were required at each end. As a result, the cost rose from £238,000 to £302,000 and a tunnel toll was charged to help recoup the cost. Gas lights provided illumination which were later replaced by electric lighting. The short Two Locks Line was built to reduce the distance travelled by boats passing through the Lapal Tunnel and heading for the Stourbridge Canal. Brewins Tunnel, which had been built on the Lodge Farm Cut in 1838 was made into a cutting and the Delph Flight of nine locks were rebuilt, the middle seven being replaced by six new locks. A loop to the south of the Netherton Tunnel at Bumble Hole was eliminated by making a new cut.

Dudley Tunnel was closed in 1884 to allow the south end to be rebuilt. The work was completed and the tunnel was reopened on 23 April 1885. It saw considerable traffic with coal and limestone passing southwards and blast furnace slag making the return journey. Subsidence affected the canal in 1894 when a section near Blackbrook Junction, including part of the Two Lock Line, fell into mine workings. The canal remained closed for some time while repairs were made. Blowers Green Lock was built near the junction of Line No. 1 and Line No. 2 at this time to replace two original locks.

A wharf was constructed for the Birmingham Battery and Metal Company in Selly Oak.

=== Decline ===
The original line at Bumble Hole became the Bumble Hole Branch Canal and Boshboil Arm after a collapse of the canal severed part of the loop. Having suffered from mining subsidence for years, the two-locks line was closed in March 1909 and later filled in. The line is now under a late 20th century industrial estate and only the junctions, towpath bridges and a few yards of watered but unnavigable canal remain.

After repeated collapses, Lapal Tunnel was abandoned in June 1917 leaving a short stretch navigable between Selly Oak and a brick works at California until 1953, after which it was drained and filled in.

== Restoration ==
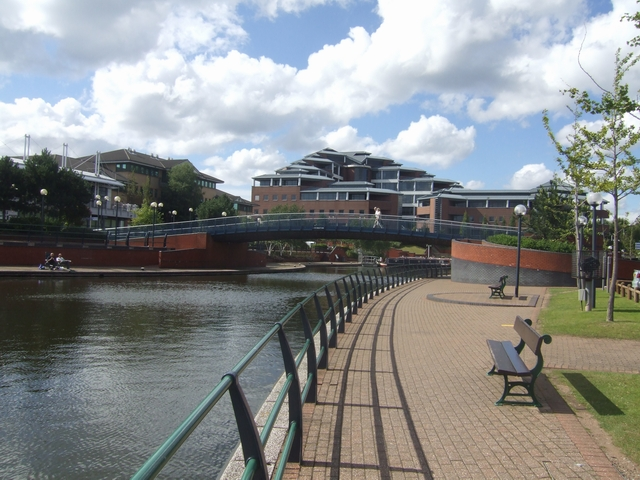
The Earl of Dudley's Bridge crosses the canal at the Merry Hill Waterfront

After a period of disuse following nationalisation in 1948, the first suggestions that the canal and others should be restored were made by the newly formed Inland Waterways Protection Society (IWPS) in 1959. However, the British Transport Commission presented their annual bill in 1961, in which the Dudley Canal and Tunnel were scheduled to be closed immediately, with no provision to safeguard the route for future restoration. Both the Inland Waterways Association and the IWPS protested, but the protests were ignored, and closure occurred by the British Transport Commission Act 1962 (10 & 11 Eliz. 2. c. xlii). Despite this, the Staffordshire and Worcestershire Canal Society explored the tunnel in mid-1963, after which a Dudley Tunnel Committee began running boat trips through it. These proved popular, and the Committee became the Dudley Canal Tunnel Preservation Society on 1 January 1964, eventually becoming the Dudley Canal Trust in 1970.

On 26 June 1970, the Inland Waterways Amenity Advisory Council, a government committee created in May 1968, held a press conference at which recommendations about the future of "remainder" waterways were made to the British Waterways Board. "Remainder" was a classification that indicated there was no obvious commercial future for the waterway. The recommendations included the returning to "cruiseway" status of nine canals, which included the Dudley Canal. The Waterways Recovery Group, formed in 1970 to co-ordinate volunteer involvement in canal restoration, began work on the canal later that year, raising public awareness of the canal and its potential as an amenity. In December 1970, the Birmingham Canal Navigations Working Party produced a report, which was published in early 1971. They recommended to the British Waterways Board that much of the Birmingham Canal system should be retained. Canals were grouped into four categories, the first two of which needed little action or expenditure to make them navigable again. The Dudley Canal was in the third category, where it was suggested that the local authorities through which the canals ran should be included in restoration plans. This plan of action had formed part of the Transport Act 1968, and was adopted soon afterwards for the Dudley Tunnel Branch.

The renamed Dudley Canal Trust began to restore the canal. Over the weekend of 26–27 September 1971, they organised "Dudley Dig and Cruise", at which over 600 people cleared a lock chamber and two lock pounds of debris. In early 1972, Dudley Corporation announced that they would provide half of the cost of restoration, and that the Park Head end of the Tunnel would be landscaped as part of a derelict land regeneration scheme. Some 50,000 tons of mud were removed from the channel by dredging, and the locks reopened later that year. The Dudley tunnel was reopened at Easter 1973, at a ceremony attended by around 14,000 visitors. A short arm north of the tunnel was restored in 1977, as part of the Black Country Museum project. Funding for this was provided by the Job Creation Scheme run by the Manpower Services Commission, as a way to provide work and training for the unemployed. The trust were able to use the museum as a base for their electrically powered trip boat, which by then had taken over 25,000 people into the tunnel since the start of trips in 1964.

Plans for the No. 2 Line moved forwards in 1980, when a boat rally was held at Hawne Basin, a former Great Western Railway interchange, where tubes were moved from boats to trains. The railway had closed in 1967, and the basin had been unused since then, but thirty boats attended the rally, and the Combeswood Canal Trust developed plans for turning it into a marina.

Part of the Lapal Tunnel was unearthed during the construction of the M5 motorway during the 1960s and the void was filled with concrete. The Lapal Canal Trust is working on the restoration of parts of the lost canal and to replace the tunnels with a completely new line, passing over the hill through Woodgate Valley Country Park.

In February 2012 plans for the regeneration of the Selly Oak area were submitted to Birmingham City Council which included a navigable section of canal from a new junction with the Worcester and Birmingham Canal to the recently reconstructed Harborne Lane bridge along the route of the former Dudley Canal.

On 28 February 2016, following re-excavation of part of the Harborne Lane Wharf, a canoe paddled by a member of the Lapal Canal Trust, became the first vessel since 1953, to proceed along the part of the Eastern length of canal which runs through Selly Oak Park and part of which, remains "in water". It was suggested, by members of the trust in attendance, that this may have been the first vessel to operate beyond Harborne Lane Wharf, since the brickworks at the Eastern end of the Lapal Tunnel was closed in 1926. Photographs were posted on the Lapal Canal Trust's website.

== Route ==
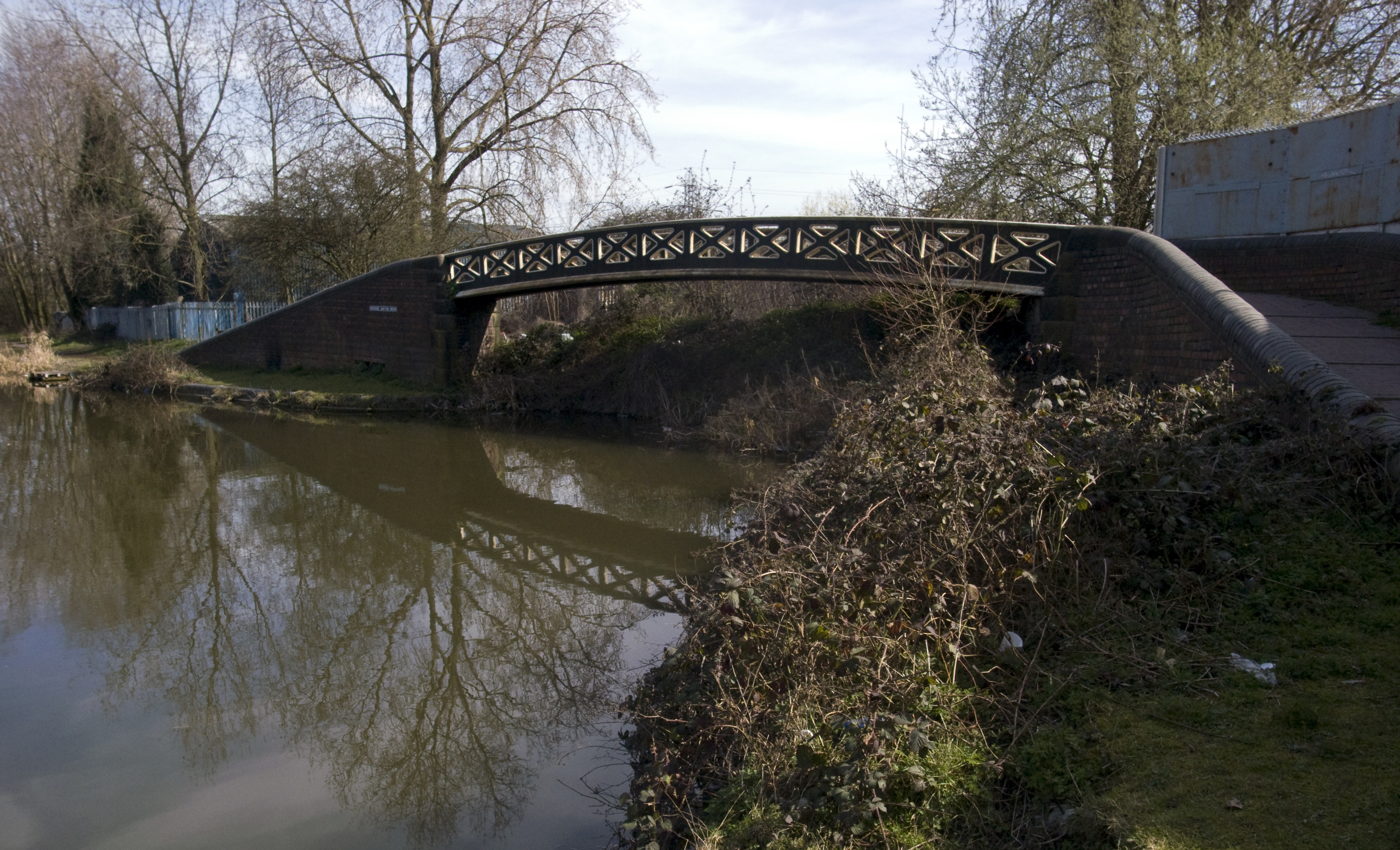
A Horseley Ironworks bridge over the disused Two Locks Line

The canal forms an end-on junction with the Stourbridge Canal at the foot of the eight Delph Locks. These are usually known as the Nine Locks, even though they were rebuilt in 1858 as a flight of eight. There is a well-restored stable block by lock 3, and a grade II listed lock keepers house near the line of the old locks, which was built in 1779, probably to a standard design by Thomas Dadford. Above the locks, the canal passes Merry Hill Shopping Centre, built on the site of Round Oak Steelworks after its closure in 1983. Although it has been closed for more than 100 years, a cast-iron footbridge, built in 1858, still carries the towpath over the former entrance to the Two Locks Line. An embankment on the side of a hill carries the canal on to Blowers Green Lock, which is the deepest lock on the Birmingham Canal Navigations, as it replaced two earlier locks which were affected by subsidence. Nearby is a pumphouse, managed by the Dudley Canal Trust. At Park Head Junction, Line No. 2 turns off to the south-east, but the original line continues through three locks to a junction with the remains of the Pensnett Canal and the Grazebrook Arm, and into the southern portal of Dudley Tunnel. At the far end is the Black Country Museum, which offers boat trips into the tunnel and associated mines.

Following Line No. 2 from Park Head Junction, the canal passes around Netherton Hill, where there are mass graves for cholera victims in St. Andrew's churchyard, after which is passes through a cutting which is part of the cut made in 1838 to accommodate the construction of Lodge Farm Reservoir. Brewins Tunnel was built here, but was uncapped after 20 years. A short arm managed by the Withymoor Island Trust is located on the west bank and is used for moorings. Beyond it, the Bumble Hole Branch partially encircles Bumble Hole, a water-filled former clay pit. This was once the main line, but the embanked route which cuts off the loop was built as part of the Netherton Tunnel project. Another part of the old loop, the Boshboil Arm, turns to the west opposite Windmill End Junction, where to the north lies the southern portal of Netherton Tunnel. Both this portal and the north portal are grade II listed structures.

From Windmill End Junction, Line No. 2 continues towards the closed Lapal Tunnel. This was once an area of industry, but most of it has gone, to be replaced by housing estates, light industrial units, and playing fields. At the northern end of Gosty Tunnel, a layby marks the site when a tug was once kept to pull barges through the tunnel. Beyond lies Hawne Basin, refurbished as a marina after its use as a railway interchange ceased in 1967. The head of navigation is just beyond the basin entrance. Much of the remaining route to the tunnel mouth is traceable, and the Lapal Canal Trust have carried out some restoration, as they have also done on the section from the eastern portal to the Worcester and Birmingham Canal at Selly Oak.

== Points of interest ==
Point	Coordinates (Links to map resources)	OS Grid Ref	Notes
Dudley Tunnel north portal	52.5233°N 2.0789°W	SO947917	
Dudley Tunnel south portal	52.5012°N 2.1007°W	SO932892	
Park Head Junction	52.4978°N 2.0990°W	SO933888	Line No 2 meets Line No 1
Delph Flight bottom lock	52.4756°N 2.1233°W	SO917864	Jn with Stourbridge Canal
West end of Two Locks Line	52.4902°N 2.1060°W	SO929880	
East end of Two Locks Line	52.4887°N 2.0990°W	SO933878	
Lodge Farm Reservoir Cut	52.4845°N 2.0926°W	SO938873	
Netherton Tunnel north portal	52.5153°N 2.0495°W	SO967908	
Netherton Tunnel south portal	52.4934°N 2.0693°W	SO953883	
Windmill End Junction	52.4916°N 2.0703°W	SO953881	
Gosty Hill Tunnel north portal	52.4701°N 2.0517°W	SO965857	
Hawne Basin	52.4577°N 2.0396°W	SO974844	
Lapal Tunnel west portal	52.4455°N 2.0287°W	SO981830	
Lapal Tunnel east portal	52.4442°N 1.9765°W	SP016829	
Harborne Lane bridge	52.4435°N 1.9426°W	SP03908288	Proposed limit "in water" from Worcester & Birmingham
Jn with Worcester & Birmingham Canal	52.4435°N 1.9378°W	SP043828	

== See also ==
- Canals of the United Kingdom
- History of the British canal system

== Bibliography ==
- Chambers, Ivor (2008). "A Guide: Windmill End to Hawne Basin" (PDF). Combeswood Canal Trust. Archived (PDF) from the original on 5 September 2018.
- Cumberlidge, Jane (2009). Inland Waterways of Great Britain (8th Ed.). Imray Laurie Norie and Wilson. ISBN 978-1-84623-010-3.
- Hadfield, Charles (1985). The Canals of the West Midlands. Newton Abbot: David and Charles. ISBN 978-0-7153-8644-6.
- Nicholson (2006). Nicholson Guide Vol 2 - Severn, Avon & Birmingham. Harper Collins. ISBN 978-0-00-721110-4.
- Squires, Roger (2008). Britain's restored canals. Landmark Publishing. ISBN 978-1-84306-331-5.
