= Lapal Tunnel =

Canal tunnel in the West Midlands, England

- Interactive map of Lapal Tunnel

Overview
- Location: West Midlands, England
- Coordinates: 52.4450°N 2.0017°W
- OS grid reference: SO998830
- Status: Closed
- Waterway: Dudley No. 2 Canal
- Start: 52.4458°N 2.0275°W
- End: 52.4442°N 1.9759°W

Operation
- Constructed: 1798
- Closed: 1917

Technical
- Design engineer: William Underhill
- Length: 3,795-yard (3,470 m)
- Tunnel clearance: 6 feet (1.8 m)
- Width: 7 feet 3 inches (2.2 m)
- Towpath: no
- Boat-passable: no

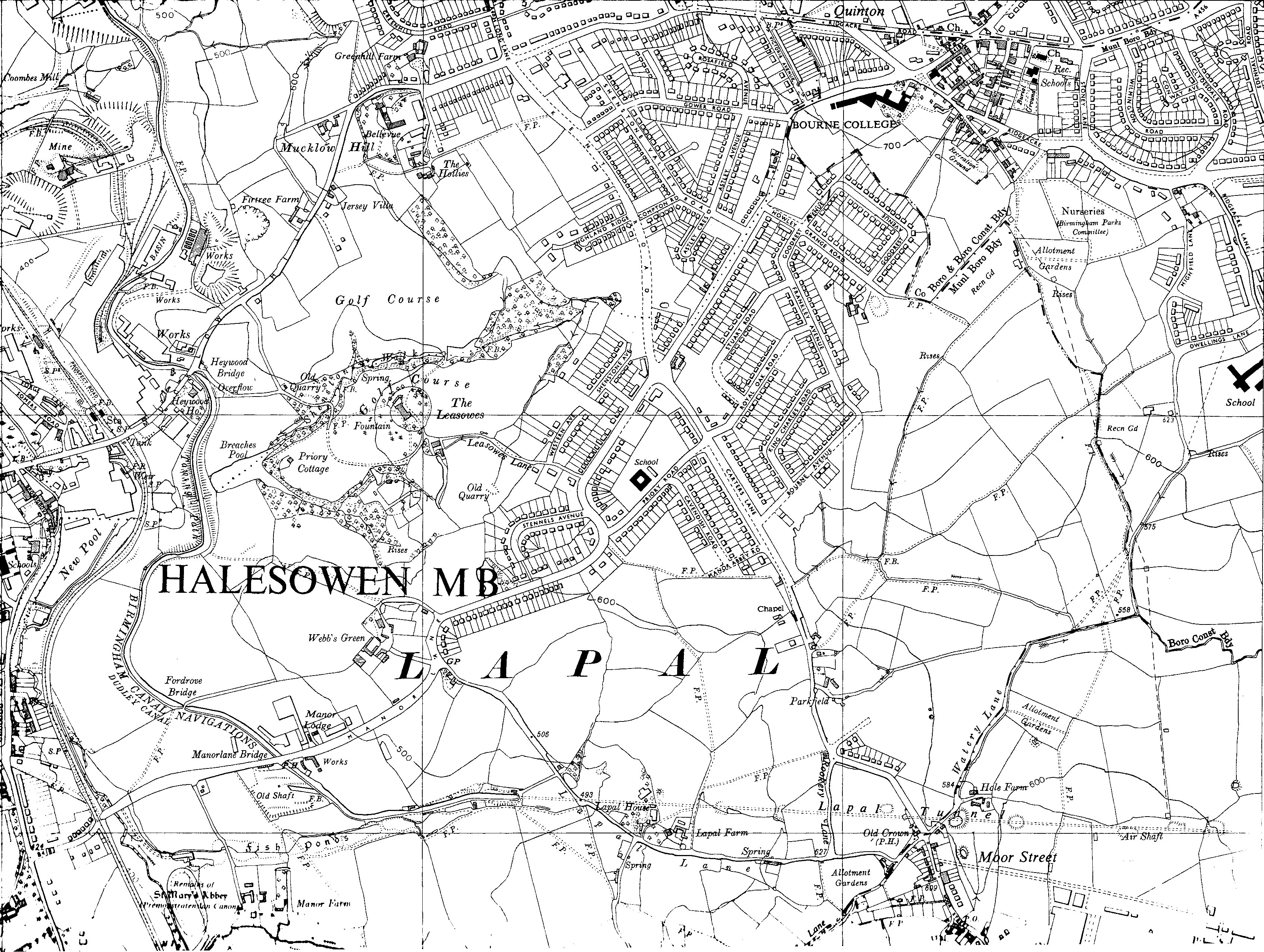
1955 Ordnance Survey map of the west portal of tunnel

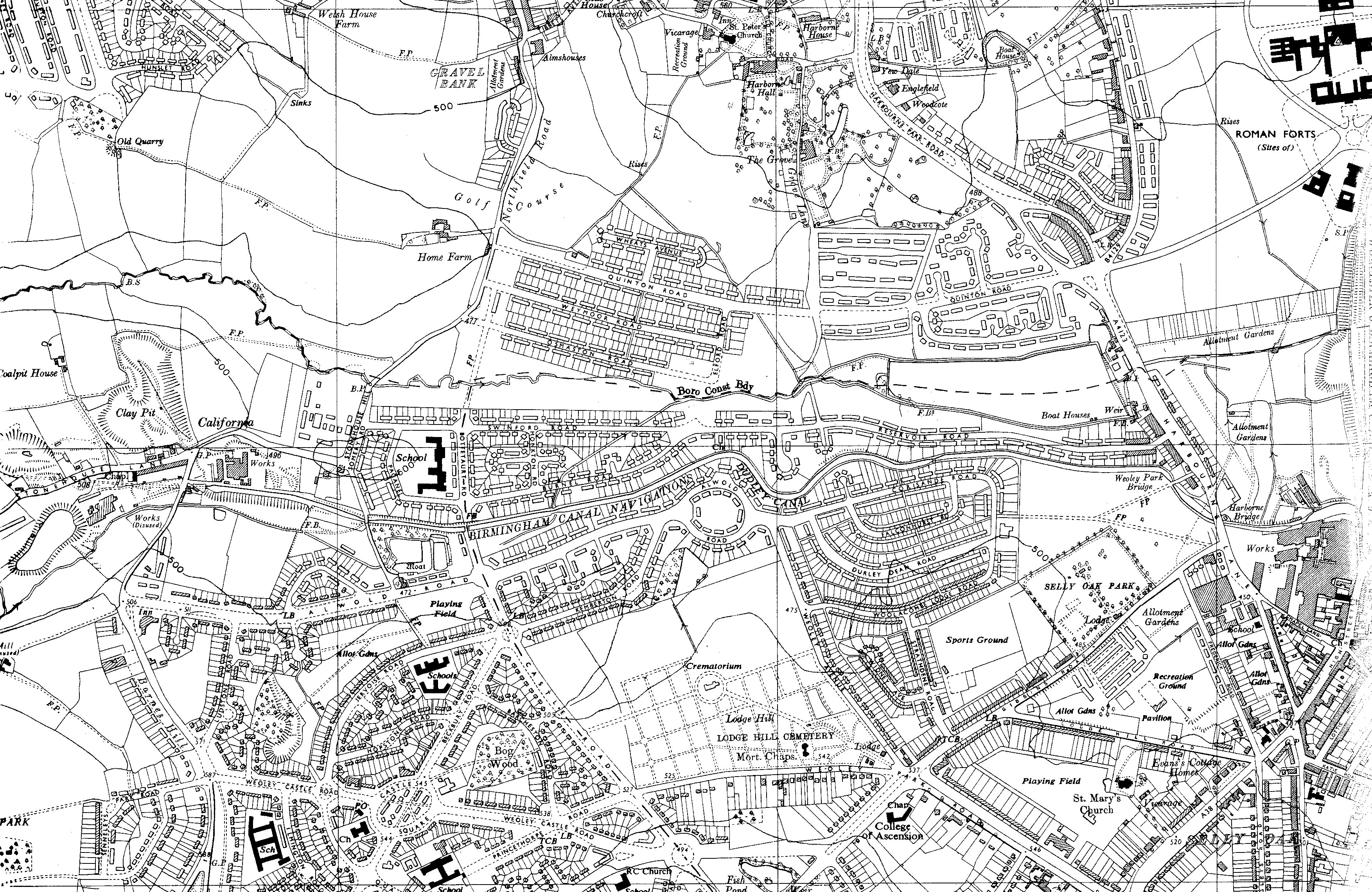
1955 Ordnance Survey map of the east portal of tunnel

The Lapal Tunnel (old spelling Lappal Tunnel) is a disused 3,795-yard (3,470 m) canal tunnel on the five mile dry section of the Dudley No. 2 Canal in the West Midlands, England. It takes its name from the settlement of Lapal.

== History ==
The narrow brick-lined tunnel, built in 1798 by William Underhill, had no towpath. It had a very small bore — at 7 feet 9 inches, barely wider than the boats which used it, with a headroom of only 6 feet. Boats originally took about three hours to complete the passage by legging or poling, so in 1841 a steam engine was built at the Halesowen end which drove a scoop wheel to load the tunnel with water. Stop gates could be opened at either end to assist boats along the tunnel in either direction.

The tunnel suffered many collapses, and after a collapse in 1917 due to mining subsidence it was abandoned. It runs under Lapal, the M5 motorway near junction 3 and Woodgate Valley Country Park. The canal between Halesowen and Selly Oak is disused and some sections have been filled in as the tunnel was considered uneconomic to repair. A short un-navigable length remains in the grounds of the Leasowes, once a garden belonging to the poet William Shenstone (1714–1763), and now a public park and golf course.

To the north of Halesowen, the canal is in good repair and is used by boats accessing Hawne Basin. The canal north of Halesowen includes the Gosty Hill Tunnel which at 557 yards (509 m) is much shorter than the Lapal Tunnel. It was built at the same time and has similar cross sectional dimensions.

== Restoration ==
The Lapal Canal Trust aims to restore the un-navigable parts of the Dudley No 2 canal to the tunnel entrance sites at Halesowen and California, from Hawne Basin and Selly Oak

They originally aimed to restore the tunnel, but a study in 2007 showed this to be unfeasible. The study showed that an "up and over" solution would be possible, though at a cost that makes its achievement in the foreseeable future somewhat unlikely.

The restoration of a short section of the canal from the junction with the Worcester Birmingham Canal to Selly Oak Park is probably achievable. The recently built supermarket on the line includes allowance for the restoration.

The exact locations of the portals at California and Halesowen can be seen on the National Library of Scotland website.

== Points of interest ==
Point	Coordinates (Links to map resources)	OS Grid Ref	Notes
End of navigable Dudley No 2 Canal	52.4565°N 2.0415°W	SO9718084325	near Halesowen
West portal	52.4458°N 2.0275°W	SO98228309	(precise OS ref from 6" map) At western end of track opposite Lapal Cottage, Lapal Lane South
Mid point	52.4450°N 2.0017°W	SP9996583000	(calculated)
East portal	52.4442°N 1.9759°W	SP01718291	(precise OS ref from 6" map) Under grass
Harborne Lane bridge	52.4435°N 1.9426°W	SP03908288	
Selly Oak Junction	52.4436°N 1.9377°W	SP0423482891	Terminus of canal at Selly Oak

== See also ==
- Dudley Tunnel
- List of canal tunnels in the United Kingdom
