= Quinton, Birmingham =

Coordinates: 52.46°N 2.00°W

Quinton
- Suburb and ward
- Location within the West Midlands
- Population: 24,174 (2011 Ward)
- Metropolitan borough: Birmingham
- Metropolitan county: West Midlands
- Region: West Midlands
- Country: England
- Sovereign state: United Kingdom
- Post town: BIRMINGHAM
- Postcode district: B32
- Dialling code: 0121
- Police: West Midlands
- Fire: West Midlands
- Ambulance: West Midlands
- UK Parliament: Birmingham Edgbaston
- Councillors: Sam Forsyth (Independents); Nagy Penakacherla (Reform UK)

Quinton is a suburb and ward of Birmingham, in the county of the West Midlands, England, 5 miles (8 km) west of the city centre. Formerly part of Halesowen parish, Quinton became part of Birmingham in 1909. Quinton was a village and the surrounding area was farmland until the 1930s when the first housing estates were developed. Most of the farmland had been built on by 1980 but some countryside remains in the form of Woodgate Valley Country Park. Along with Bartley Green, Harborne and Edgbaston, Quinton is within the Birmingham Edgbaston constituency.

== History ==
The name of Quinton is thought to derive from Cweningtun, meaning the queen's settlement.

Quinton was formerly a chapelry in the ancient parish of Halesowen and was largely owned in medieval times by the wealthy abbey at Lapal near Halesowen. In the 1840s, when called The Quinton, mention was made of two small coal mines in the area and that the inhabitants were employed in nail manufacturing. It formed, with most of Halesowen parish, a detached part of Shropshire, until moving to Worcestershire in 1844. In 1866 Ridgacre became a separate civil parish, in 1894 the parish was renamed from "Ridgacre" to "Quinton". On 1 April 1912 the parish was abolished and merged with Birmingham. In 1911 the parish had a population of 1120. Quinton developed along the turnpiked Kidderminster and Birmingham road.

Data from the 1881 census shows working in agriculture and the building trades to be the top two male occupations whereas for working women it was domestic service and nail making.

=== Bourne College ===
Prior to the construction of the M5 motorway, Quinton's north western boundary extended over 250 metres (820 ft) to the west. Where is now the Chantry Drive housing development there formerly stood the Primitive Methodist, Bourne College in its 19 acres (7.7 ha) of grounds. The college, a boarding school for boys, was built in 1882 and named after one of the joint founders of Primitive Methodism, Hugh Bourne. Hoosen Close is named after the college's only headmaster. The college closed in 1928 and the buildings were used from 1931 as a residential home for elderly men, known as Quinton Hall. The hall was demolished in 1978.

=== Incorporation into Birmingham ===
Quinton with its population of 1,100 and area of 838 acres (339 ha) was incorporated into the county borough of Birmingham, in Warwickshire, on 9 November 1909. Quinton residents voted by 180 out of 224 to join with Birmingham rather than remain in Halesowen Rural District though it remained a parish until 1912. The main benefit for Quinton Parish Council was connection to an extended Birmingham drainage and sewerage network. For Birmingham Corporation the attraction was the prospect of developing farmland for housing. A tree was planted by Birmingham's Lord Mayor in Quinton Recreation Ground to commemorate the centenary. Quinton became, with the rest of Birmingham, part of the metropolitan county of the West Midlands on 1 April 1974, under the Local Government Act 1972.

=== World wars ===
Although a First World War Zeppelin flew over Quinton on 31 January 1916, its bombing target was Halesowen and no bombs were dropped on the parish. Quinton remained in character a village rather than a suburb until large-scale private housing development of the 1930s. Factory developments were not planned for the area because of objections by residents of Edgbaston to the possibility of fumes being blown over by the wind and so Quinton was not a prime bombing target for the German Luftwaffe. On 17 July 1941, all six crew of a Royal Air Force, World War Two, Armstrong Whitworth Whitley (Z6476) bomber died when their plane crashed in Quinton after striking a barrage balloon cable on a training flight from RAF Abingdon. The only fatalities from German bombs that fell on Quinton were a mother and son who perished on 18 October 1940 when a newsagents on Court Oak Road was hit. Three houses in Wolverhampton Road South were ruined and several more damaged in the same raid. Overall, Quinton was not greatly affected by bombing compared to some areas of Birmingham and the Black Country.

== Geography ==
Quinton is covered by the B32 postal district. The northern boundary of Quinton is the southern side of the A456/A458 Hagley Road West between Balden Road and the M5 motorway; the northern side is Brandhall in the Metropolitan Borough of Sandwell. The M5 forms the western boundary down to junction 3, and separates Quinton from the town of Halesowen in the Metropolitan Borough of Dudley. The Bourn Brook in Woodgate Valley Country Park is the southern boundary and divides Quinton from Woodgate, South Woodgate and Bartley Green. Balden Road, Tennal Lane and West Boulevard (B4121) form the eastern boundary, however, the ward boundary extends further east to Lordswood Road in the B17 postcode area of Harborne.

Quinton covers an area of 4.8 square kilometres (2 sq mi) though its boundaries have since expanded slightly. Eastern parts were formerly known as Ridgacre, with Quinton or "The Quinton" being the area now around the church.

Elevation

Quinton's highest point is 226 metres (741 ft) above sea level at the original village centre on High Street. The land drops away to the south and east to a low of 154 metres (505 ft) at the Bourn Brook by West Boulevard. The top of the spire of the (Church of England) Christ Church is the highest point of any building in Birmingham. The escarpment a little to the west forms part of the national watershed, dividing the catchment areas of the River Severn and the River Trent.

Housing

The area is almost entirely residential, though there are typical small local service businesses. An office park, accessed from the Quinton Expressway, has been built on part of Quinton Meadows.

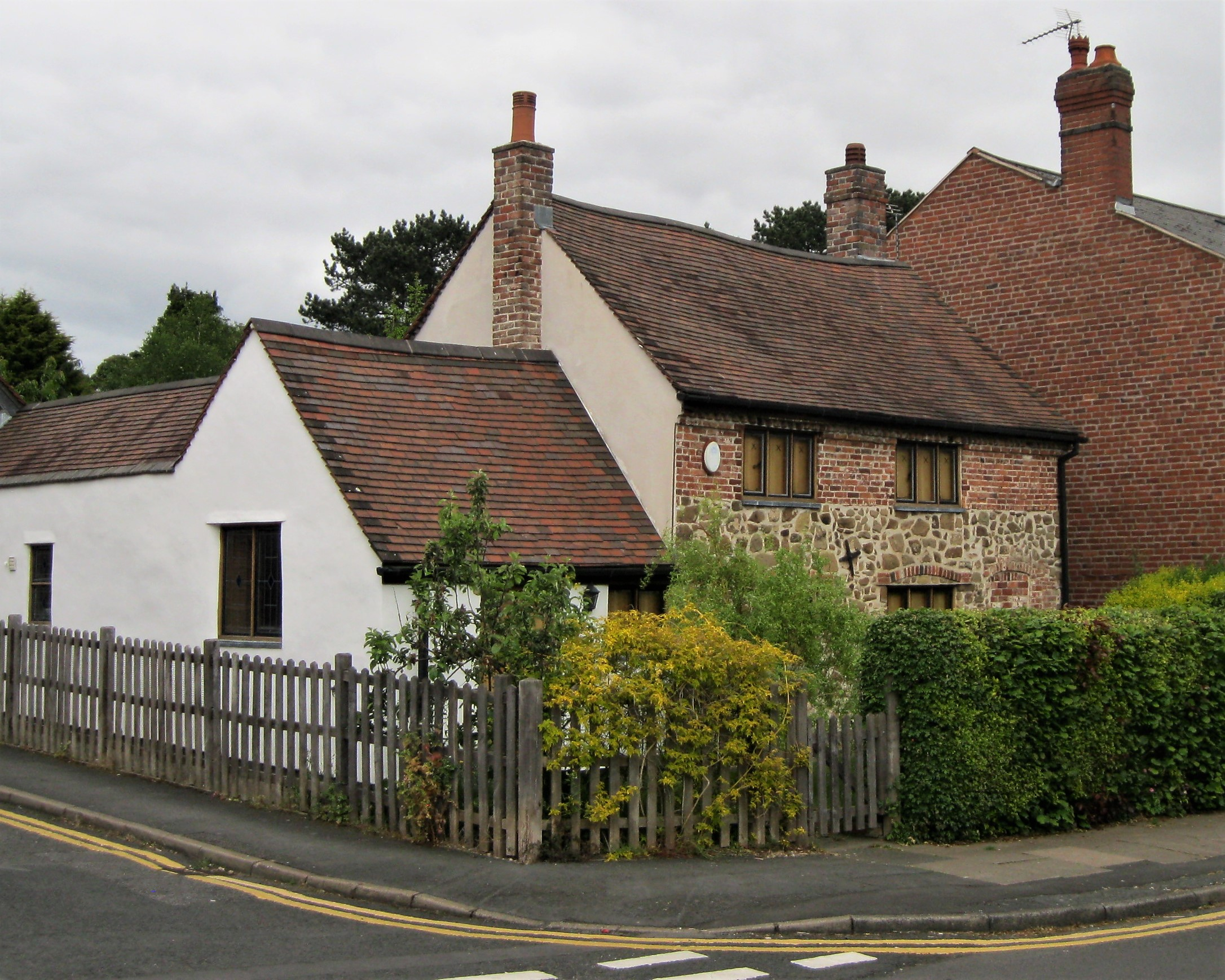
Nailer's Cottage on Ridgacre Road West

The original Quinton village in the area around Christ Church on Hagley Road West is of largely Victorian terraced houses. On the corner of Ridgacre Road West and High Street stands the Nailer's Cottage, apparently 18th century, but whose lower walls may date back to the 16th century. It is the oldest dwelling in Quinton. The village spread south in the 1970s with the Chichester Drive housing development.

Much of the Ridgacre estate consists of medium-sized, private semi-detached houses from the 1930s and 1940s. Many of the roads are tree-lined. Construction of the estate was halted during World War II. In the 1950s, council houses typical of the period were built. Further council housing was built south of Quinton Road West along Simmons Drive in the 1970s, encroaching into the Woodgate Valley. Most of the housing is two storey terraces but there are some three storey townhouses all of which originally had integral garages. At the head of each of the V-shaped cul-de-sacs that project into Woodgate Valley is a four-storey block of flats.

Parks and open spaces

The northern part of Woodgate Valley Country Park down to the Bourn Brook lies in Quinton. Woodland and shrubs planted in the late 1980s predominate, but there are also some smaller areas of open meadow.

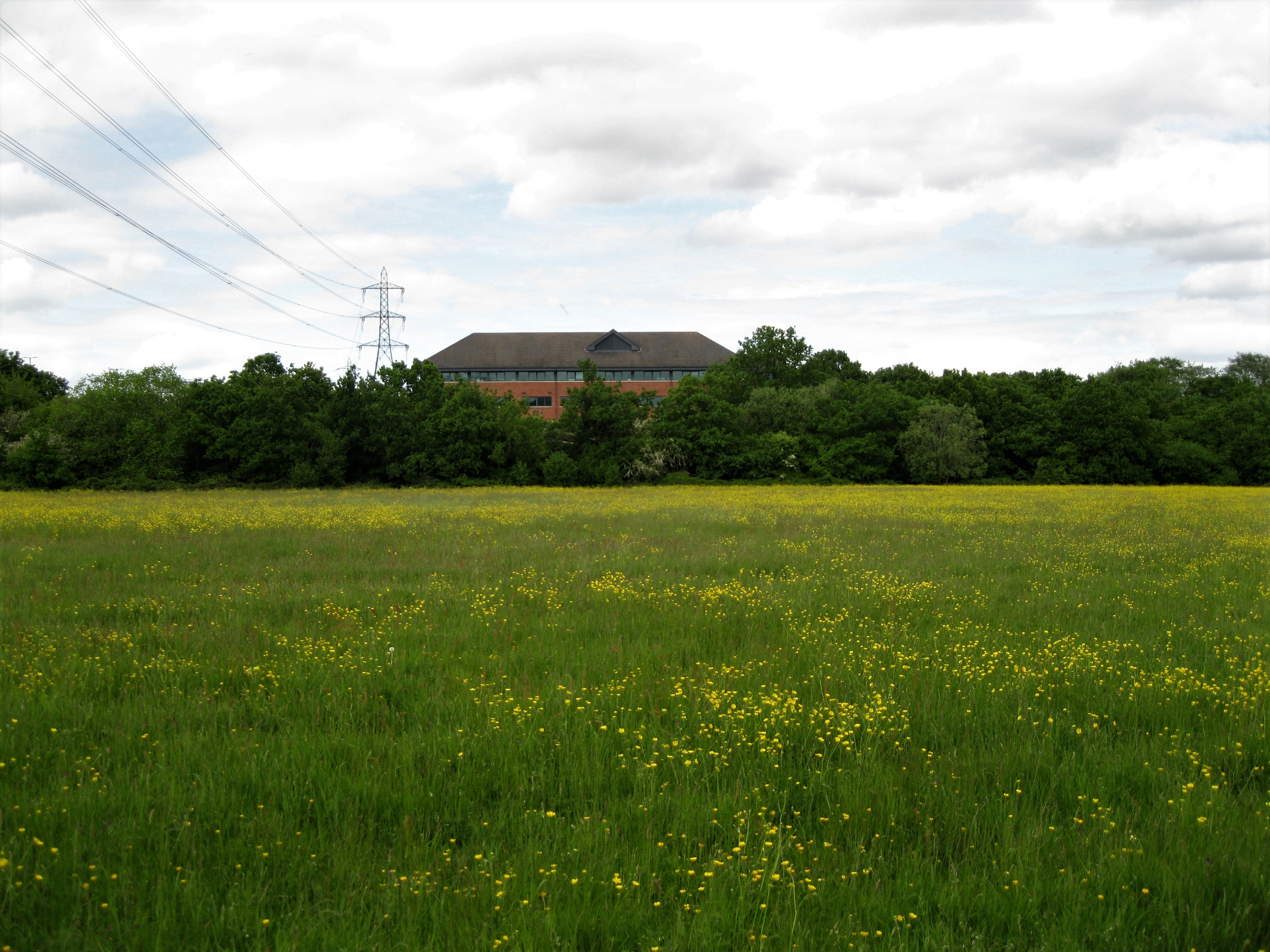
Quinton Meadows looking north to the business park

Quinton Meadows Local Nature Reserve comprises 25 acres (10 ha) of grassland and woodland sandwiched between the M5 motorway and the A456 Quinton Expressway. Access from Woodgate Valley Country Park is via a pelican crossing on the Expressway. 18 acres (7 ha) of the meadows were lost in the early 2000s following the construction of Quinton Business Park.

Quinton Recreation Ground next to the M5 is accessed from Meadow Road and Powell Avenue. Highfield Farm Recreation Ground has a children's play area, multi-sports pitch and exercise equipment. There is car parking off Highfield Lane.

Transport infrastructure

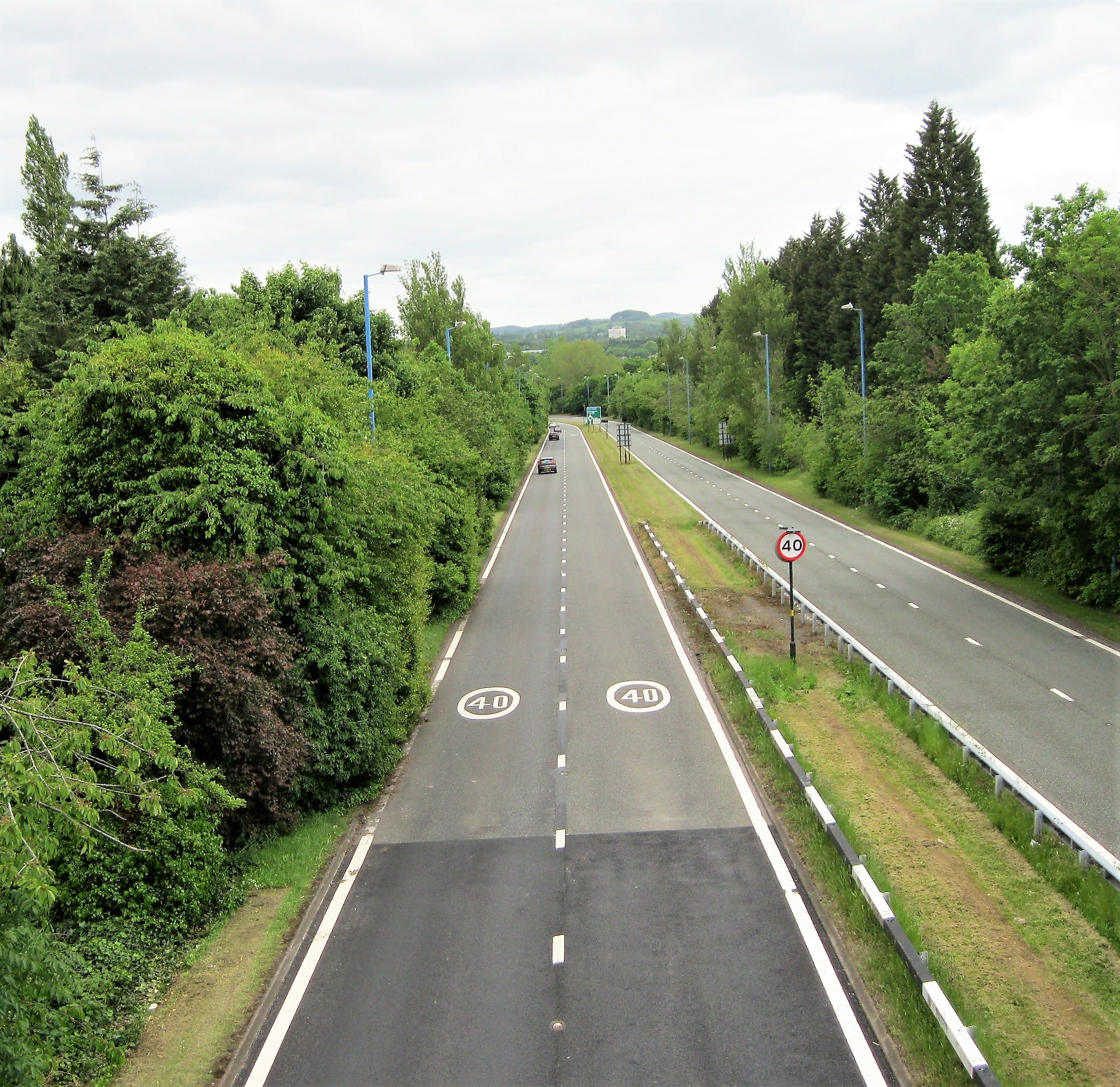
The Quinton Expressway (A456) looking south

The 1.25 miles (2 km) long A456 Quinton Expressway links Quinton to the M5 motorway at junction 3 via a short underpass. The A456 continues as Hagley Road West towards Birmingham city centre. The A458 to Halesowen via Mucklow Hill begins at the Quinton traffic island. A short section of the A4123, enters Quinton as Wolverhampton Road South and bears east along Court Oak Road towards Harborne. West Boulevard used to terminate at Quinton Road West but was extended in August 1986 across the Woodgate Valley and reclassified as the B4121.

No railway lines or canals pass through Quinton.

== Demography ==
The 2021 Population Census recorded that 21,377 people were living in Quinton, down from 23,084 in 2001. 40% (8,548) of the ward's population consisted of ethnic minorities (up from 14.5% in 2001), compared with 51.3% for Birmingham. 46.8% of the population of Quinton stated Christianity as their religion in 2021, down from 71.7% in 2001.

== Politics ==
Quinton ward is currently represented on Birmingham City Council by two councillors: an independent, Sam Forsyth, and Nagu Penakacherla of Reform UK.

The ward of Quinton forms part of Birmingham Edgbaston constituency along with Bartley Green, Edgbaston, Harborne and North Edgbaston, which has been represented by Labour Co-operative MP Preet Kaur Gill since 2017.

== Education and community facilities ==
Quinton has one secondary school, Four Dwellings Academy and four primary schools; Quinton Church Primary, World's End Junior, Woodhouse Primary Academy and Four Dwellings Primary Academy. Quinton Church Primary School's roots go back to 1846, six years after the consecration of Christ Church. Pitts Wood, a small ancient woodland designated as a Site of Importance for Nature Conservation adjoins Woodhouse Primary Academy and is used by the school for environmental education.

Quinton Library on the corner of Overdale Road and Ridgacre Road opened on 2 June 1974. Adjoining the library is Quinborne Community Centre whose roots go back to 1938 at the former Edgbaston Golf Clubhouse. Quinborne is an amalgam of Quinton and Harborne. The centre includes a stage and indoor sports facility, Bennett Hall, built in 1958 from funds donated by the late Lord Peter Bennett. The community association offers academic, activity and social classes. There is also a pre-school nursery and youth club.

The area is served by three post offices: Quinton post office on Hagley Road West in Quinton village, Faraday Avenue post office on Worlds End Lane and West Boulevard post office on Court Oak Road.

Quinton police station on Quinton Road West had permanently closed and the building was set to be sold off, however in October 2023 West Midlands Police and Crime Commissioner, Simon Foster announced the station is to be reopened in 2024.

The main supermarkets are Tesco on the corner of Ridgacre Lane and Ridgacre Road built in 2007 on the site of Birmingham Corporation's Quinton bus depot and Asda on Hagley Road West which opened in October 2011 on the site of the Kings Highway public house.

Quinton Cemetery covering 51 acres (21 ha) opened in 1923 and although in Halesowen is owned and maintained by Birmingham City Council. The office and Registrar’s house were built in 1936.

The Reel Cinema, again just over the border in Halesowen, opened in 1939 as the Danilo. It was renamed the Essoldo in 1954 and upon becoming multi-screened in 1973 was known as the Quinton Classic.

Quinton Art Festival was established in 2001 and takes place annually at the Methodist Church hall over three days in May. There are up to 300 paintings and drawings on display along with craft stalls, flower displays and art demonstrations, plus a Friday evening concert.

== Religious sites ==
The Early English styled Christ Church is of red sandstone and was built at a cost of £2,500 in 1840. The "Old Burial Ground" at the end of the church drive, next to Quinton Church Primary School was opened in 1898. Half of the site was for members of the Church of England and half for other residents of the parish; each administered separately. In the 1950s the grounds became overgrown and by the 1980s were in effect closed. Since 2006 the area has been restored and maintained.

St Boniface, Church of England on Quinton Road West, consecrated in 1959, was designed by the architectural partnership of Bromilow, While & Smeaton who also designed St John the Baptist's Church, Longbridge. It is within the Diocese of Birmingham. The church building of brick has a clerestory with dormer windows as part of a steeply pitched roof. The gabled west front is surmounted by an octagonal, louvred, copper-roofed bell turret. The altar by architect, W H Bidlake came from St Stephen's, Newtown Row.

Quinton Methodist Church on Ridgeway Avenue just over the border in Halesowen was built by William Jackson of Langley Green to a design by Selby Clewer and opened on 3 February 1968. The building replaced one on College Road opened in 1888 that was demolished to make way for the M5 motorway. Ridgacre Methodist Church on World's End Lane opened in May 1951.

The Catholic parish of Our Lady of Fatima is part of the Archdiocese of Birmingham. The Parish Hall was built in Higgins Lane in 1952 and served as a dual purpose building for both church and social activities. The present church was built next to the hall, and was consecrated on 7 October 1978 by His Grace, George Patrick Dwyer, Archbishop of Birmingham. Our Lady of Fatima Catholic Primary School is on Winchfield Drive, Harborne.

Quinton Evangelical Free Church on World's End Lane and Ridgacre Road has served the local community since 1944. The Christadelphian Hall on Ridgacre Road dates from 1938.

== Public transport ==
National Express West Midlands buses serve the area. Buses from Birmingham city centre to Stourbridge (service no. 9), Wolverhampton (X8) and Gornal Wood (X10) all stop along Hagley Road West. Service no. 24 Birmingham – Woodgate Valley North stops on Court Oak Road, Ridgacre Road, Ridgacre Lane, Highfield Lane, Simmons Drive and Quinton Road West. Services also run to Dudley and Q.E. Hospital (service no. 19), West Bromwich (54 - operated by Diamond) and Longbridge (55 – operated by Kevs Cars and Coaches). Service 55 was previously numbered 39 and starts from outside the Tesco store built on the site of Quinton bus garage.

== Sport ==
Quinton is home to three amateur football teams, Quinton Monarch, Quinton Magpies and Quinton Rangers, all three play in the Warley and District Football League. A healthy local rivalry has been built up over several years with the Monarch significantly more successful.

== Cultural references ==
Quinton was fictionalised as "Tilton" by Francis Brett Young in his 1931 novel Mr & Mrs Pennington.

== Notable people ==
- Adrian Chiles
- Elliot Knight, British actor best known for his role as Aiden Walker in How To Get Away With Murder.
- Joleon Lescott, grew up in Quinton and attended the Four Dwellings High School
- Bill Oddie
- Jerome Sinclair, footballer
- The Twang, an indie band who were formed in Quinton.
