= Bartley Green =

Coordinates: 52.43°N 01.98°W

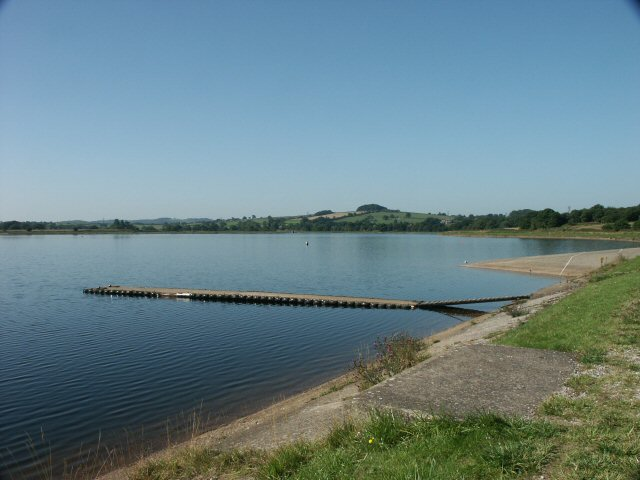

- Location within the West Midlands
- Area: 7.8 km^{2} (3.0 sq mi)
- Population: 22,670 (2021. Ward)
  - Density: 2,906/km^{2} (7,530/sq mi)
- OS grid reference: SP015825
- Metropolitan borough: Birmingham
- Metropolitan county: West Midlands
- Region: West Midlands
- Country: England
- Sovereign state: United Kingdom
- Post town: BIRMINGHAM
- Postcode district: B31 B32
- Dialling code: 0121
- Police: West Midlands
- Fire: West Midlands
- Ambulance: West Midlands
- UK Parliament: Birmingham Edgbaston

Bartley Green is a residential suburban area and electoral ward in Birmingham, England, 5 miles (8 km) south west of the city centre. The ward is part of the Birmingham Edgbaston constituency and is represented in parliament by Labour Co-operative MP Preet Kaur Gill.

== History ==
Bartley Green was first noted in the Domesday Book of 1086 as Berchelai. This means either the birch tree wood or the clearing in the birch trees (from the Old English "beorc leah"). Bartley Green was part of the estate of the manor of Weoley. Bartley Green was again mentioned in 1657, however, this time it was under its current name. Most of the land occupied by Bartley Reservoir was in the parish of Northfield, Birmingham, originally in Worcestershire. It was transferred to Warwickshire when Northfield became part of Birmingham in November 1911.

Bartley Green became more built up after the end of the Second World War in 1945, with a mix of private and council housing being built.

The Athol Farm council estate was a notable development by the city council during the 1960s, and included five tower blocks; however all of these have now been demolished.

However, the south-west end of the reservoir overlapped into the parish of Frankley, in Worcestershire (Hereford and Worcester, from 1974). In April 1995, part of Frankley (including the south-west part of Bartley Reservoir) was transferred to Birmingham and became part of the West Midlands county.

The parish church is St. Michael and All Angels.

== Geography ==
Located to the east is the Weoley ward, to the south is Frankley and to the west is the county of Worcestershire as well as Halesowen and Illey, part of Dudley MBC. To the north is Quinton and Woodgate Valley Country Park. Bartley Reservoir, a reservoir for drinking water, is used by Bartley Sailing Club and nearby schools and clubs for sailing and canoeing.

== Politics ==
Bartley Green has been part of the Birmingham Edgbaston constituency since 1997, having previously been in the neighbouring Birmingham Northfield Constituency. Since its inclusion, the Labour Party have held the seat in every general election, which is currently represented by Labour MP Preet Gill since June 2017, and previously by Gisela Stuart who held the seat since 1997, replacing Conservative Dame Jill Knight in the year of Tony Blair's landslide victory. Edgbaston has had a female Member of Parliament since 1953, longer than any other UK constituency.

Bartley Green has been a safe Conservative ward at Birmingham City Council level in recent years, with all three serving Councillors – John Lines, Vivienne Barton and Bruce Lines (son of John) – representing the party. Labour candidates had won the ward on several occasions in the 1980s and early 1990s but never held all three seats at once. The most recent election in which it was won by Labour was in 1995.

Councillor John Lines was Lord Mayor of Birmingham in 2012/13.

The ward has adopted a Ward Support Officer, with the current holder of the status being Tina Willetts.

== Demography ==
The United Kingdom Census 2021 found that 22,670 people lived in Bartley Green with a population density of 2,880 people per km^{2}. Bartley Green has an area of 7.8 km^{2}/ 885.6 hectares. The ward had a female proportion of 52.7%, above the city average of 51.6% and the national average of 51.3%. The male population represented 47.3% of the population total.

26.6% (6,260) of the ward's population represent ethnic minorities, compared with 51.3% for Birmingham. 15.4% of the population was born outside the United Kingdom. The White ethnic group was the largest at 72.4%. Black was the second largest at 10%. 50.2% of the population stated themselves as Christian, down from 73.5% in 2001. 40% stated they were of no religion.

98.8% of the population lived in households, above the city and national averages of 98.3% and 98.2% respectively. 1.2% lived in communal establishments. A total of 11,160 households in the ward are occupied, resulting in an average of 2.3 people living in each house. This is below the city average of 2.5 and the national average of 2.4. 49.9% of the occupied households are occupied by the owner, below the city average of 60.4%. 37.3% of the occupied households are rented from Birmingham City Council, above the city average of 19.4%. 394 households were stated as being vacant. The most common form of housing in the ward is terraced housing, with 35% of all houses being terraced. 32.6% of houses were stated as being semi-detached. A high proportion of the housing stock in the ward was constructed after 1945 (98.8%) compared with a city average of 67.4%. Much of the housing is now in poor condition.

The ward currently ranks in the top 7% in terms of deprivation on Government indices. 16.9% were of a pensionable age, compared with 16.7% for the city and 18.4% for the country. 60.1% of the population was of a working age, above the city average at 59.8% and below the national average of 61.5%. The largest age group was 25–44 at 27.3%. 10.2% of the population is unemployed, of which 36.5% are in long term unemployment. 18.1% of the Bartley Green working population worked in the manufacturing sector. The largest employer organisation in the ward was identified by the Birmingham Chamber of Commerce as Birmingham Accord Ltd., a construction firm that employs approximately 600 people.

== Notable people ==
Bartley Reservoir is the place where Bill Oddie did a lot of his early birdwatching, and features in his books (notably Bill Oddie's Gone Birding) and television programmes. His first ever published article, for the West Midland Bird Club's annual report, was about the birds of the reservoir.

Kelli Dayton (also known as Kelli Ali) is a female vocalist most recognised for being the lead singer for the trip-hop group Sneaker Pimps, grew up in Bartley Green.

Jane Bunford, the tallest person ever to have lived in the United Kingdom, who reached a height of 7 feet 11 inches (2.41 m), lived in Bartley Green until her death at her home on 1 April 1922. Her hair measured 8 feet 1 inch (2.46 m).

== Sport and recreation ==
Bartley Green has produced sportsmen and women including Fliss Johnson, a former pupil of Woodgate Primary School, who became the English Ladies Amateur Golf Champion in May 2005 and won the BBC Midlands Sports Woman of the Year Award. Bartley Green F.C. were a successful football club based in the ward and past members of the Midland Combination Premier Division. There are at least five amateur football teams in the area; Bartley Revolution FC, Bartley Green Blades, Angels F.C., Bartley Green Falcons and the Rea Valley Colts. Bartley Green Leisure Centre is the local leisure centre. The Judo club based in Bartley Green meets at the nearby Shenley Court Community Leisure Centre in Northfield.

Woodgate Valley Country Park is a 450-acre (1.8 km^{2}) park on the cusp of Bartley Green and Quinton, and features a city farm and café.

== Schools and education ==
Bartley Green National School opened in 1840 as a Sunday school. The site was subsequently enlarged and the school rebuilt in 1871. By 1872, there were two departments for mixed and infant children. A new infants school opened in 1881 on a site to the north of the church. The school was reorganised in 1931 into a single department for junior mixed and infant children aged 5 – 9½ years. Children aged 9½ and over were transferred to Bartley Green Council School. In 1951, the school was again reorganised for infant children only. It closed in 1954 on the opening of St. Michael's C.E. Primary School. The last headteacher of the primary school, Lily C. Treadwell, was transferred to St. Michael's C.E. Primary School to become its first headteacher.

Bartley Green Council School opened in 1914 replacing Woodgate Council School. It was reorganised in 1931 for Senior Mixed and again in 1951 for Junior Mixed. The school closed in 1953 when the pupils transferred to Woodgate County Primary School.

=== Primary schools ===
There are eight primary schools located within the Bartley Green ward. As part of the Bartley Green Action Plan, all primary schools were given golf facilities. Woodgate Junior and Infant School, Kitwell Junior and Infant School, St. Michael's C.E. Junior and Infant School and St. Peter's R.C. School all had golf courses constructed within their school grounds for the pupils.

=== Secondary schools ===
Bartley Green School was granted technology status in 2000 and has 848 pupils on roll. 61% of pupils are boys and 12.3% of pupils come from ethnic minorities. Half of these pupils from ethnic minorities are from the Black Caribbean ethnic group.

A survey conducted by the Department of Applied Social Studies and Social Research in 1998, concluded that "52.4% of pupils at Bartley Green School live in 40% of the Birmingham Enumeration Districts with the highest proportion of the population dependent on income support. Around half of the pupils at the school live in the Bartley Green ward, and 22.9% live in the Weoley and Longbridge wards. All of these wards have urban deprivation scores considerably above the Birmingham average, which itself is far higher than the national average."

Hillcrest School was opened as Bartley Green Grammar School for Girls on 7 September 1954. The sixth form was set up around the end of the 1950s. The school was renamed Hillcrest School in September 1983 and dropped its grammar school status. During an uncertain period, it faced closure during the 1980s. However, it remained open following a campaign by the school and has since become one of the most successful schools in Birmingham. Boys were allowed to join the sixth form during the 1980s.

King Edward VI Five Ways moved to the area from Five Ways in 1958, however, retained the name. Having introduced girls in the years following 1998, today Five Ways is the largest co-educational state grammar school in the West Midlands and one of the top five co-educational grammar schools nationally.

=== University ===
- Newman University
