= Lapal =

Coordinates: 52.451°N 2.0220°W

- Residential area
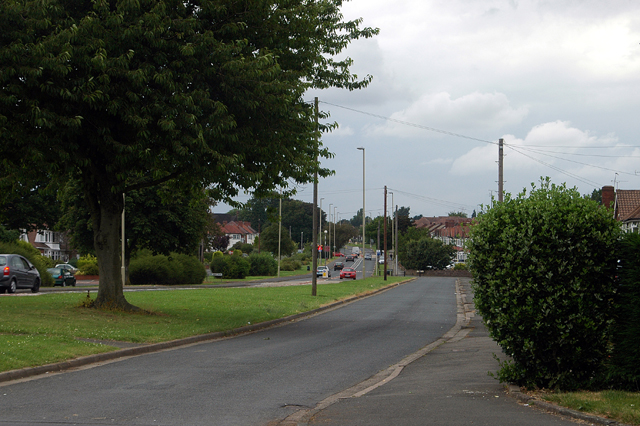
- Carter's Lane

- Location within the West Midlands
- Metropolitan borough: Dudley
- Metropolitan county: West Midlands
- Region: West Midlands
- Country: England
- Sovereign state: United Kingdom
- Police: West Midlands
- Fire: West Midlands
- Ambulance: West Midlands

Lapal is a residential area of Halesowen, in the Dudley district, in the county of the West Midlands of England (part of Worcestershire until 1974). It is situated in the east of the town on the border with Birmingham. The Lapal area sits to the East of the Lapal Canal, to the North of Lapal Lane South up to what is now the M5 motorway, to the South West of Carters Lane and Kent Road, and to the South East of Mucklow Hill. Most of the houses were built between 1930 and 1980. In the late 1970s the large Abbeyfields estate was built alongside the currently disused portion of the Dudley Canal, adding to its already extensive owner-occupier housing stock.

It is the most affluent suburb of Halesowen, commanding the largest average house prices of all the suburbs in the town.

The area is served by Lapal Primary School and Leasowes High School, the Royal Oak public house and a small cluster of shops opposite, including a newsagent/post office, bakery, fish and chip shop, Chinese take-away, pharmacy and general grocery store. Also to be found in the area the ruins of the 13th century Halesowen Abbey, located in a field off the Manor Way by-pass.

The area has local bus connections with Halesowen town centre, Stourbridge, Brierley Hill, Cradley Heath, Merry Hill, Birmingham and Oldbury. It is situated near to Junction 3 of the M5 motorway.

The disused Lapal Canal Tunnel is nearby.

== History ==
Lapal was formerly a township in the parish of Halesowen, in 1866 Lapal became a separate civil parish, on 1 April 1974 the parish was abolished. In 1951 the parish had a population of 2730.
