= Merry Hill Shopping Centre =

Shopping centre in England

Merry Hill
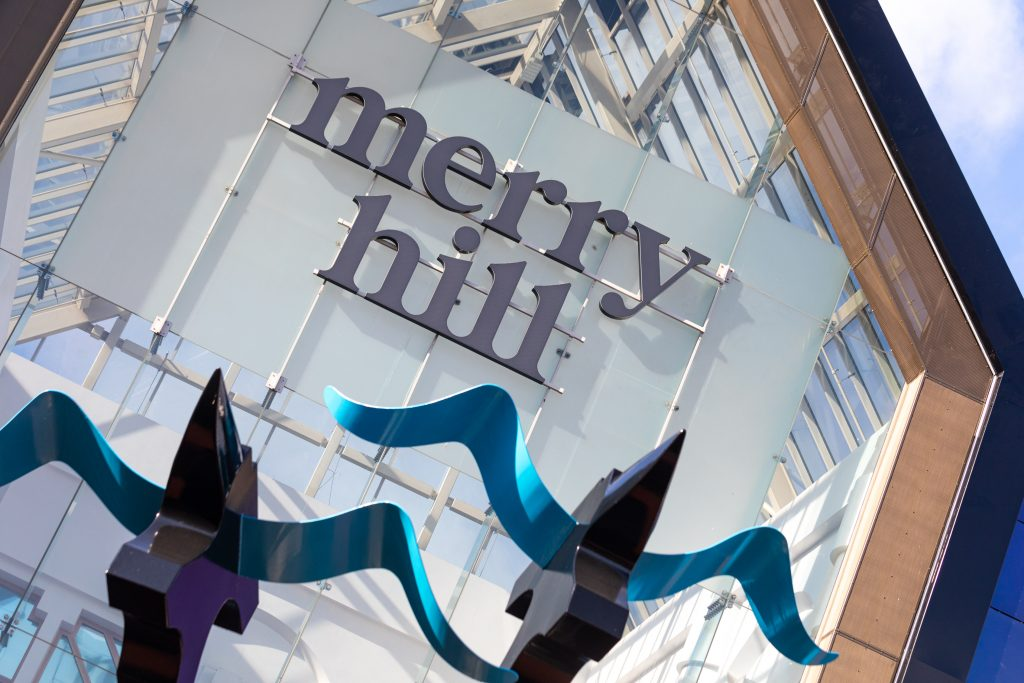
- Entrance to Merry Hill, featuring the flying anvil sculptures.
- Location: Brierley Hill, West Midlands, England
- Coordinates: 52°28′53.4″N 2°6′39.4″W
- Opened: 1985; 41 years ago
- Developer: Richardson Developments
- Manager: Savills
- Owner: Redical Limited
- Num. of stores: 217
- Num. of anchor tenants: 5
- Floor area: 1,671,000 square feet (155,200 m^{2})
- Floors: 2 (Some shops have extra floors)
- Website: mymerryhill.co.uk

Merry Hill (formerly Intu Merry Hill, Westfield Merry Hill and The Merry Hill Shopping Centre) is a large shopping complex in Brierley Hill near Dudley, England. It was developed between 1985 and 1990, with several subsequent expansion and renovation projects. The centre has more than 200 shops, a retail park, cinema, food court, arcade and more than 10,000 parking spaces, and is anchored by Harvey Norman, Marks & Spencer, Primark, Asda and Next.

Adjacent to the main shopping mall is a marina called The Waterfront accommodating a number of bars, restaurants, the studios of Black Country Radio, and the Headquarters and Control Room of West Midlands Ambulance Service. The Dudley No.1 Canal passes through The Waterfront and along the edge of the shopping centre before descending to Delph Locks.

The centre's original developers and owners were Richardson Developments. Savills carry out the day-to-day management of Merry Hill and strategic planning and asset management is by Sovereign Centros on behalf of the current owners.

== History ==
=== Background ===
At the beginning of the 1980s, the recently elected Conservative government of Margaret Thatcher created a number of enterprise zones to attract businesses to areas of high unemployment that had resulted from the down-sizing or closure of major industrial concerns. On 29 October 1980, Chancellor Geoffrey Howe announced that Dudley Council's application for an enterprise zone near to Brierley Hill had been successful. The enterprise zone included Merry Hill Farm, a large open green space cherished locally as a haven for wildlife. It was anticipated that the enterprise zone would help replace some of the lost jobs in manufacturing. Incentives for business included a relaxation of planning rules, enhanced capital allowances on industrial and commercial buildings, exemption from Development Land Tax and a ten-year exemption from business rates.

In December 1982, the neighbouring Round Oak Steelworks closed with the loss of around 1,300 jobs; later, the enterprise zone was extended to include the Round Oak site. Jobs were created in the small and medium-sized units built by developers on trading estates, but no large-scale manufacturing business had been attracted to the enterprise zone. Oldbury-based Richardson Developments, which had bought both the Merry Hill Farm and Round Oak sites, decided to focus on retail and leisure, rather than manufacturing for Merry Hill Farm.

The building contract for the shopping malls was awarded to Tarmac Construction.

Prior to the first retail unit opening, planning officials working for Dudley Council warned of the adverse effect the proposed shopping centre would likely have on shops in nearby Brierley Hill, Quarry Bank and Stourbridge. Neighbouring local authorities and West Midlands County Council agreed and sought to curb retail development within the enterprise zone, fearing the effect retail provision at Merry Hill would have on the wider area. The Evening Mail newspaper advised careful consideration but viewed job creation within the enterprise zone as the priority, whether from manufacturing or retail.

While the centre was still being developed in the late 1980s, plans were unveiled to build the world's tallest tower at Merry Hill. The tower would have been 2,000 feet tall, with a hotel at its base, a restaurant halfway up and a nightclub plus observatory at the top. However, plans to build it were scrapped in 1992.

=== 1980s–1990s ===
Despite protests from some local residents over construction taking place on the green space, rather than on the former steelworks site, the first phase of the project went ahead and by Christmas 1985 a Queensway furniture store, an MFI home furnishings retail warehouse (the very first tenant) and an Atlantis Electrical superstore were all trading. Shortly before this, the developers announced plans to triple the amount of retail floorspace at Merry Hill within 18 months, subject to Dudley Council's approval. Early 1986 saw the opening of Halfords, B&Q and Texas Homecare.

In February 1986, the chairman of the West Midlands strategic planning committee took the "unprecedented" step of writing to leading retailers, spelling out the "strong opposition" to further expansion of retail at Merry Hill. Environment Secretary Kenneth Baker had given Dudley Council the power to amend the enterprise zone conditions, but despite his urging, Dudley councillors decided by a single vote to back developer Don and Roy Richardson's plans.

Merry Hill had the first free-standing Pizza Hut in the UK, one of the first drive-thru McDonald's restaurants in the UK and the largest Texas Homecare store – all of them opened during 1986.

A Carrefour hypermarket opened on 1 July 1986 as part of the first phase of the indoor shopping centre, but closed within 18 months, its place taken by a Gateway supermarket. Asda had replaced Gateway by 1990 and have held the tenancy ever since; they already had a store in Brierley Hill town centre as well as several others in the wider Black Country area but the Brierley Hill store remained open. The ground floor of the shopping mall was extended during 1987 and an upper shopping level added in early 1988. A separate 10-screen cinema opened in November 1988. The 350-seat Jules Verne food court, which offered a round-the-world eating experience and had a large globe-shaped balloon as its centrepiece, opened in June 1989 on the upper level; however, it closed within five years owing to disappointing trade, and was subdivided into additional retail units.

Construction of the final phase of the centre was completed in 1989. A Sainsbury's supermarket and Burger King fast-food outlet opened in September and department stores Debenhams and British Home Stores in November. Marks and Spencer opened on 23 October 1990, following the closure of its West Bromwich and Dudley stores on 25 August; C&A and Littlewoods stores also opened around this time. This part of the shopping centre was partly remodelled in 1996.

The completion of Merry Hill resulted in the loss of many big name retailers from nearby town centres, with Dudley being the hardest hit, suffering an estimated 70% decline in retailing market share between 1985 and 1990. However, some retailers kept their stores in nearby towns open, despite opening new stores at Merry Hill.

In autumn 1991, the Marks & Spencer store expanded on the ground level into a vacant neighbouring unit. The Littlewoods store had expanded some years earlier, into a former Woolworths store on the upper level. The Littlewoods store was taken over by Marks & Spencer in the late 1990s and converted into a furniture and menswear store with café.

An impact study on the effect Merry Hill had on retailing in nearby towns was commissioned by West Midland local authorities, public transport coordinator CENTRO and the Department of the Environment. The report, published in 1993, found Dudley town centre to have been most adversely affected, followed by Stourbridge, Halesowen, Kidderminster and West Bromwich; Brierley Hill and Cradley Heath had suffered "a qualitative decline in retailing". Merry Hill was found to have had only a limited impact on the larger centres of Birmingham, Wolverhampton and Walsall. The exodus of retailers from Dudley, and to a lesser degree Stourbridge and Halesowen, left a number of large empty premises, leading many shoppers to abandon the town centres for the Merry Hill Centre, affecting the viability of those shops remaining.

The 1993 impact study found that Merry Hill employed some 3,370 people of whom 80 per cent were women. 69 per cent of the jobs were part-time.

The initial developer and owner was a business set up by entrepreneurial twin brothers Don and Roy Richardson, who grew up near the site. The 1989 expansion of the centre was a joint venture between the Richardsons and Tony Clegg's publicly listed Mountleigh and by late 1990 the Richardsons had sold their interest in the shopping centre to Mountleigh.

Mountleigh's ownership was short-lived. The Merry Hill Centre was soon put up for sale by Mountleigh's new American owners to pay down the company's debts. In January 1992, a sale was agreed, but fell through possibly owing to what were later, unfounded land contamination issues. In May 1992, it was announced that receivers were to be appointed by Mountleigh's bankers and in February 1993 Merry Hill was sold to Elliott Bernerd's London property company Chelsfield and an undisclosed international partner. Chelsfield had assumed full ownership of the shopping centre by June 1996.

Access to the complex was improved in 1998 by alterations to the two junctions with the A4036 Dudley – Pedmore Road. More than 40 houses were demolished to make way for the widened road and re-designed Quarry Bank junction.

=== 2000s–2010s ===
Westfield, the Australian-owned shopping centre group, took over the Merry Hill Centre as a member of the consortium that acquired Chelsfield in December 2004, but two years later sold 50 per cent to fund manager Queensland Investment Corporation. The Merry Hill Centre continues to draw most of its trade from the local area. The developers did plan that the centre would attract visitors from across the country, by building coach parks; however, the centre failed to attract nationwide visitors as anticipated and the coach parks were redeveloped with private housing and flats in 2003. In 2008, Merry Hill Centre, alongside nearby Brierley Hill, was redesignated as the "strategic town centre" of the Dudley Borough, and thus the focus of future local government investment. Eat Central was opened on 22 October 2009, by TV chef James Martin at the cost of £24 million. The food court reused the Eat Central branding from Westfield Derby (Derbion), which opened two years earlier, despite that centre losing the Eat Central branding in 2017.

A further blow came when Dudley Metropolitan Borough announced that it was bringing in parking charges throughout the area in 2011; this turned more shoppers away from local town centres, and towards the Merry Hill Centre, where parking remains free. Though there have since been plans for introducing parking charges at the centre, this has been criticised owing to fears of impacting trade.

Intu Properties purchased Westfield's 50 per cent in March 2014 and became full owners in June 2016 after buying out Queensland Investment Corporation's stake; the centre was renamed to Intu Merry Hill.

In 2018, a new 75,000 sq-ft flagship Next store opened replacing the Sainsbury's store that closed on 31 December 2016.

=== 2020s ===
In June 2020, Intu became Merry Hill's second owner to enter administration, 28 years after Mountleigh. Ownership of the centre passed to a group of banks that were creditors of the centre and that appointed managers to run the centre; the centre was reverted to its old name.

It was announced on 26 September 2021 that the centre would undergo a 5-year improvement and expansion plan to become the "Ultimate family shopping and leisure destination in the West Midlands". While the expansions are still in the early planning stage, there are plans to divide the centre into new districts focusing on entertainment, fashion, and health and wellbeing among others. Early concept art shows the new area containing a new Odeon cinema and the expansion linking into the existing Eat Central area. Alongside this, there are plans to improve connections to The Waterfront and wider surrounding areas.

Changes include most of the outside of the centre's wall tiles being replaced by more colourful ones, reworked entrances and a new brand identity. The centre also got a new leisure quarter which consists of Hollywood Bowl and many restaurants.

On 15 January 2024, Australian retailer Harvey Norman announced it would be opening its first store in the UK in the centre, in part of the former Debenhams unit. The former Debenhams was split into three units, with Harvey Norman, XF Gyms and Funstation opening.

In June 2025, Marks & Spencer announced that it would be merging its stores in the centre into one big store, although the café would move into a standalone concession. The combined store opened on 27 November 2025.

Following ongoing refurbishments, the centre was put up for sale in early September 2025 for a reported asking price in the region of £250 million; the sale is being managed by Knight Frank. Bidders included Frasers Group, INGKA Centres, KLX Retail Estate Partners and Redical, with the last mentioned being the frontrunner.

On 20 March 2026, Redical finalised the purchase of the centre.

== The Waterfront ==
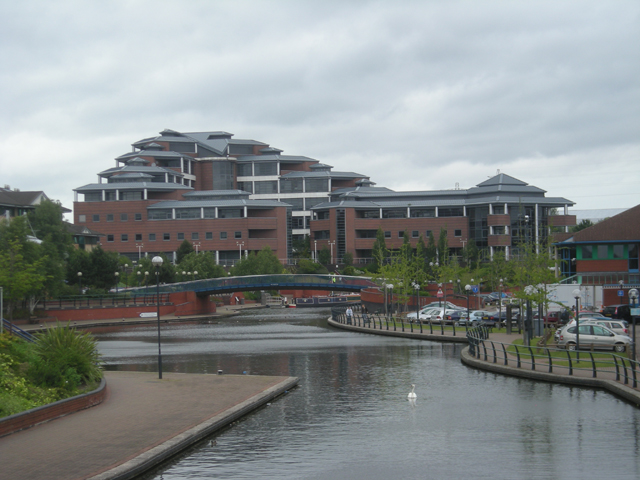
The Waterfront development

Redevelopment of the Round Oaks steelworks site did not commence until 1989, when construction began on The Waterfront development, which consisted of Phases 6–8. Phase 6 saw the construction of 69,700 square metres (750,245 sq ft) of offices (the first of which was occupied in December 1990), Phase 7 saw the construction of 6,500 square metres (69,965 sq ft) of restaurants and bars, and Phase 8 saw the addition of a 15,800 square metres (170,070 sq ft) business park, which was completed in 1995. Waterfront Way was opened in December 1990 to serve the new complex and provide a road link to the shopping centre and also to the main A461 road between Dudley and Stourbridge.

The Waterfront development created some 4,000 jobs, but the onset of another recession in 2008 saw many businesses vacate the development, leaving a high percentage of office units and other buildings empty. In June 2011, in a bid to bring jobs back to the Waterfront, the area was among the candidates for enterprise zone status once again – 17 years after the original enterprise zone expired.

== Main centre ==
The centre has around 217 stores and more than 10,000 free parking spaces, with a total retail floorspace of 1,671,000 square feet (155,200 m^{2}) making the centre the eighth largest in the United Kingdom, behind Westfield London, the MetroCentre, Bluewater, Trafford Centre and Westfield Stratford City.

The centre has space for five anchors; these currently consist of Marks & Spencer, Primark, Asda and Next. The centre had a Debenhams as its anchor tenant, which was closed on 15 May 2021 as a part of the wider administration process. It also contains a range of other major brands and privately operated stores. Notable names are H&M, TK Maxx, Sports Direct and Boots, and food tenants include Nando's, Slim Chickens, Wagamama and Wingstop.

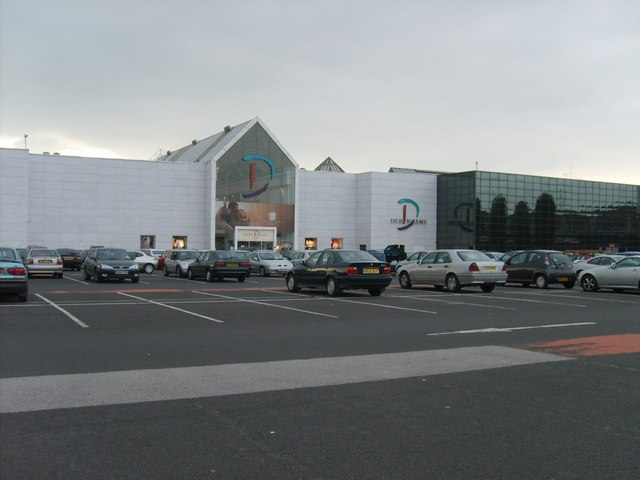
The former Debenhams store at Merry Hill

=== Main centre anchors ===
Store	Notes
Asda	Originally occupied by Carrefour, then Gateway
Marks & Spencer	Originally two stores for menswear and womenswear; former store formerly occupied by Littlewoods
Primark	Formerly occupied by WHSmith, MK One, Index and BHS
Harvey Norman	Formerly occupied by Debenhams
Next	Formerly occupied by Sainsbury's

=== Eat Central ===
Located on the Upper Mall, Eat Central was opened on 22 October 2009, by TV chef James Martin at the cost of £24 million to the centre's then owners, Westfield Group. The food court features a unique lighting system developed by into lighting to lessen the use of more traditional downlights and reused the Eat Central branding from Westfield Derby (Derbion), which opened two years earlier, despite that centre losing the Eat Central branding in 2017.

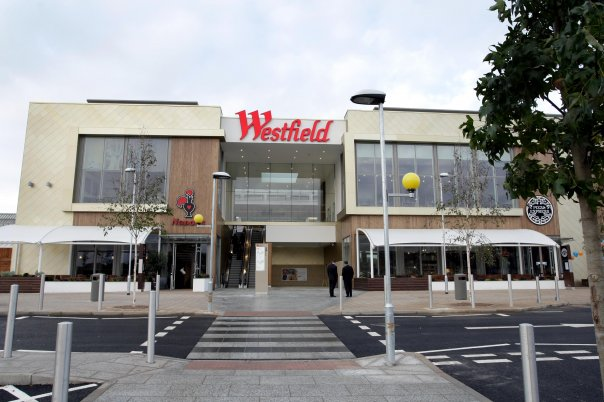
Merry Hill Eat Central exterior entrance with the former Westfield branding

On opening, Eat Central consisted of 16 eatery units in the main food court and three two-story restaurant units to the rear. However, this has since been reduced to one unit being occupied by retailer Max Spielmann and another unit at the entrance to the food court now being used as extra seating; it was previously occupied by the now-defunct retailer Phones 4u. Additionally, one of the three restaurant units to the rear has remained empty since opening. Opening day eateries consisted of Nando's, Pizza Express, Burger King, KFC, Subway, Napoli Italian, Oporto (Chicken & Burgers), Tiffinbites (Asian), Nineteen Ten Mexican, Yangtze Express, Zetao Noodles and Sushi, Crepescape, Muffin Break and Harpers English classics. The Pizza Express closed in late 2020 as part of a wider restructuring of the company.

== Retail park ==
Beyond the main shopping centre is a separate retail park that has a number of shops and restaurants and also a cinema. Stores in this area include Wren Kitchens, Oak Furniture Land, Bensons for Beds, The Range, Currys, B&M Home & Garden, B&Q, Pets at Home and Matalan.

In April 2021, Lidl announced plans to open a store in part of the former Ultimate Outdoors unit; this happened in 2022. TK Maxx opened in the rest of the unit in the same year, replacing a unit in the Merry Hill centre itself.

=== Cinema ===
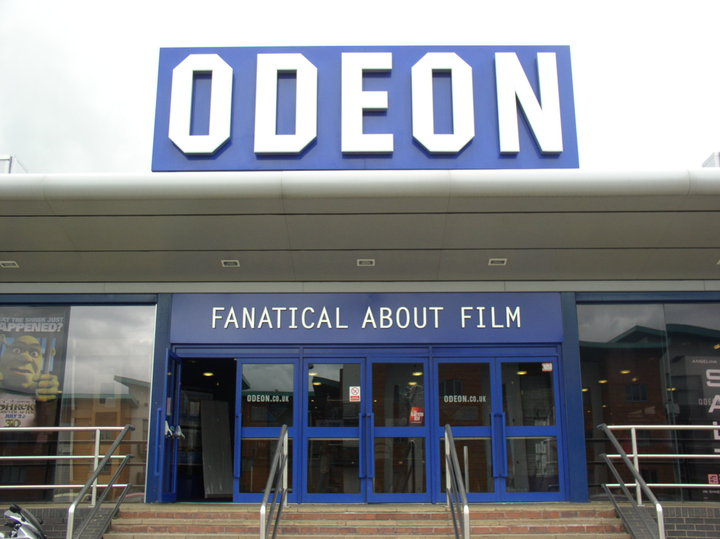
Odeon Cinemas, Merry Hill

There is a ten-screen Odeon Cinema situated on the retail park. It was the first multiplex cinema in the Dudley borough and the first new one to have been built for some fifty years. It was originally owned by AMC Cinemas and later sold to UCI Cinemas. It was refurbished following the 2005 merger with the Odeon Cinemas chain.

== Recent developments ==
The owners and local council leaders have stated their aim to connect and integrate better Merry Hill with the traditional town centre of Brierley Hill. The Dudley Canal was re-routed in the late-1990s, and between 2002 and 2005, housing has been developed around the complex (several apartment blocks opposite the cinema as well as apartments and houses overlooking Pedmore Road). A new line of the West Midlands Metro tram system was scheduled to reach the site in 2011, but was delayed with a new opening date of late 2023. Owing to lack of finance, the link has been delayed further and completion depends upon additional funding being given.

In July 2017, plans were revealed to expand the centre to include more restaurants and to open a new Odeon cinema inside the centre to replace the old multiplex at the retail park. These plans were put forward after Intu acquired the existing Odeon Cinemas building and it would have been built at the rear of the centre, connecting to phase 1 of the centre and would have doubled the amount of leisure and entertainment located at the centre to 10%. However, as of early 2021 the aging multiplex continues to operate on the retail park and no further plans or information has been released following the 2017 announcement.

== Transport ==
=== Bus station ===
A bus station has served Merry Hill since its opening, but the current, more substantial bus station was developed in the early 1990s and gives direct connections to towns including Dudley, Halesowen, Stourbridge, Walsall, West Bromwich and Cradley Heath as well as the cities of Birmingham and Wolverhampton.

Similarly, the bus services connect the centre to Cradley Heath railway station, for West Midlands Trains services to Birmingham Snow Hill, Kidderminster and Worcester via Stourbridge Junction.

Various distance bus services from Merry Hill are operated by Diamond West Midlands and West Midlands Bus.

=== Bus services ===
Route	Destination	Operator	Notes
2/2A	Wrens Nest via Wallows Road (2A), Brierley Hill, Russell's Hall Hospital and Dudley	National Express West Midlands (NXWM)	Formerly Numbered 222 running to Dudley only
3	West Bromwich via Cradley Heath, Old Hill, Blackheath, Portway and Oldbury	NXWM, Carolean	Formerly Numbered 289 serving Rowley Regis Hospital. Carolean operate journeys after 19:30 and all day Sunday.
4M	Walsall via Cradley Heath, Old Hill, Blackheath, Oldbury, West Bromwich, Stone Cross and Caldmore	NXWM	
7	Dudley & Wollaston, West Midlands via Merry Hill, Lye and Pedmore	NXWM	Formerly Numbered 276 and additional early morning Mon–Fri journeys were operated by Diamond Bus & Hansons Local Buses
8	Wolverhampton & Wollaston Farm via Coseley, Dudley, Merry Hill and Stourbridge	NXWM	Service used to serve Wrens Nest instead of Wolverhampton and was also numbered X96
15	Wombourne via Brierley Hill, Bromley, Kingswinford and Himley	NXWM	Formerly Numbered 255/ 255A. On late evenings and Sundays, service 15 runs only as far as Wall Heath. This service previously continued to Wolverhampton. 15 was shortened to Wombourne in June 2025.
24	Halesowen via Saltwells, Cradley Heath, Old Hill, Rowley Regis and Blackheath	Diamond Bus	Service 24 serves Rowley Regis Station. It replaced service 24 (Dudley – Merry Hill), which was operated by National Express West Midlands. 24H was withdrawn and replaced the sole 24.
25	Stourbridge & Dudley via Saltwells and Merry Hill	Diamond Bus	To be operated by National Express West Midlands from 26 July 2026
25A	Kidderminster & Dudley via Netherton, Saltwells, Merry Hill, Stourbridge and Norton	Diamond Bus	From 26 July 2026, this service will be operated by National Express West Midlands and renumbered as 25.
X10	Birmingham & Gornal Wood	NXWM	Replaced 236/237 Merry Hill – Gornal Wood, which had partly replaced the 136/137 Gornal Wood to Birmingham and also replaced the 141.
217	Blackheath via Cradley Heath, Old Hill, Halesowen and Olive Lane	Diamond Bus	Introduced on 25 January 2026 replacing 17H between Halesowen and Merry Hill, part of the 231 and part of the 24H serving Dudley Wood Road.
002	Weoley Castle via Colley Gate, Halesowen, Lapal, Woodgate and Bartley Green	Diamond Bus	Replaced by X21 on Sundays.
'X21	Birmingham via Colley Gate, Halesowen, Lapal, Woodgate, Bartley Green, Weoley Castle, Selly Oak and University	NXWM	Operates on Sundays replacing only the 002 service.
13	Halesowen via Saltwells, Netherend and Fatherless Barn	Diamond Bus	
142/142A	Halesowen via Stourbridge, Withymoor Village	Diamond Bus	To be operated by National Express West Midlands from 26 July 2026. The service will follow the current 25 route between Merry Hill and Stourbridge. Withymoor Village will be served by service 25 instead.
226	Dudley via Bromley, Kingswinford, Ashwood Park and Pensnett	Diamond Bus	Operates as 226A on evening and Sundays serving Ashwood Park estate. From 19 July, service 226A will run Mon–Fri off-peak with all journeys on service 226 serving Ashwood Park.

=== West Midlands Metro Line Two ===
Transport for West Midlands (TfWM) is currently constructing a new line of the West Midlands Metro from Wednesbury to Brierley Hill, with two new stops at The Waterfront and Merry Hill. The line was first planned in 1986 and was expected to be built during the 1990s, but funding and planning difficulties resulted in a 30-year delay to this project becoming a reality. As of January 2026, construction of the Wednesbury to Dudley section is well underway and expected to open in August 2026, with the Dudley to Brierley Hill section set to open in 2028.

== Monorail ==
An elevated monorail was opened at Merry Hill in June 1991, but closed in 1996 as a result of a combination of technical problems and safety concerns (especially the difficulty of evacuation), exacerbated by a dispute between the owners of Merry Hill and The Waterfront, which at the time were owned separately. The infrastructure was later removed, leaving only one disused monorail station and part of the old railings visible – on top of the Marks and Spencer store roof.

The monorail cost £22 million to build, the construction work taking place alongside the final phase of the shopping complex in 1988–1989, but owing to health and safety concerns, it did not open until 19 months after the centre was completed.

There were to be five stations, with the system extending over the canal and terminating close to the site of the former Round Oak railway station where an interchange with a West Midlands Metro extension was proposed. However, only the first four stations were completed; Waterfront East, Central Station, Times Square and Boulevard; with Waterfront West planned as a future development.

The system was officially opened on 1 June 1991. The actual public opening was delayed while Her Majesty's Railway Inspectorate investigated evacuation procedures. After operating for a short while, the monorail was temporarily closed again in 1992, but ran sporadically until 1996.

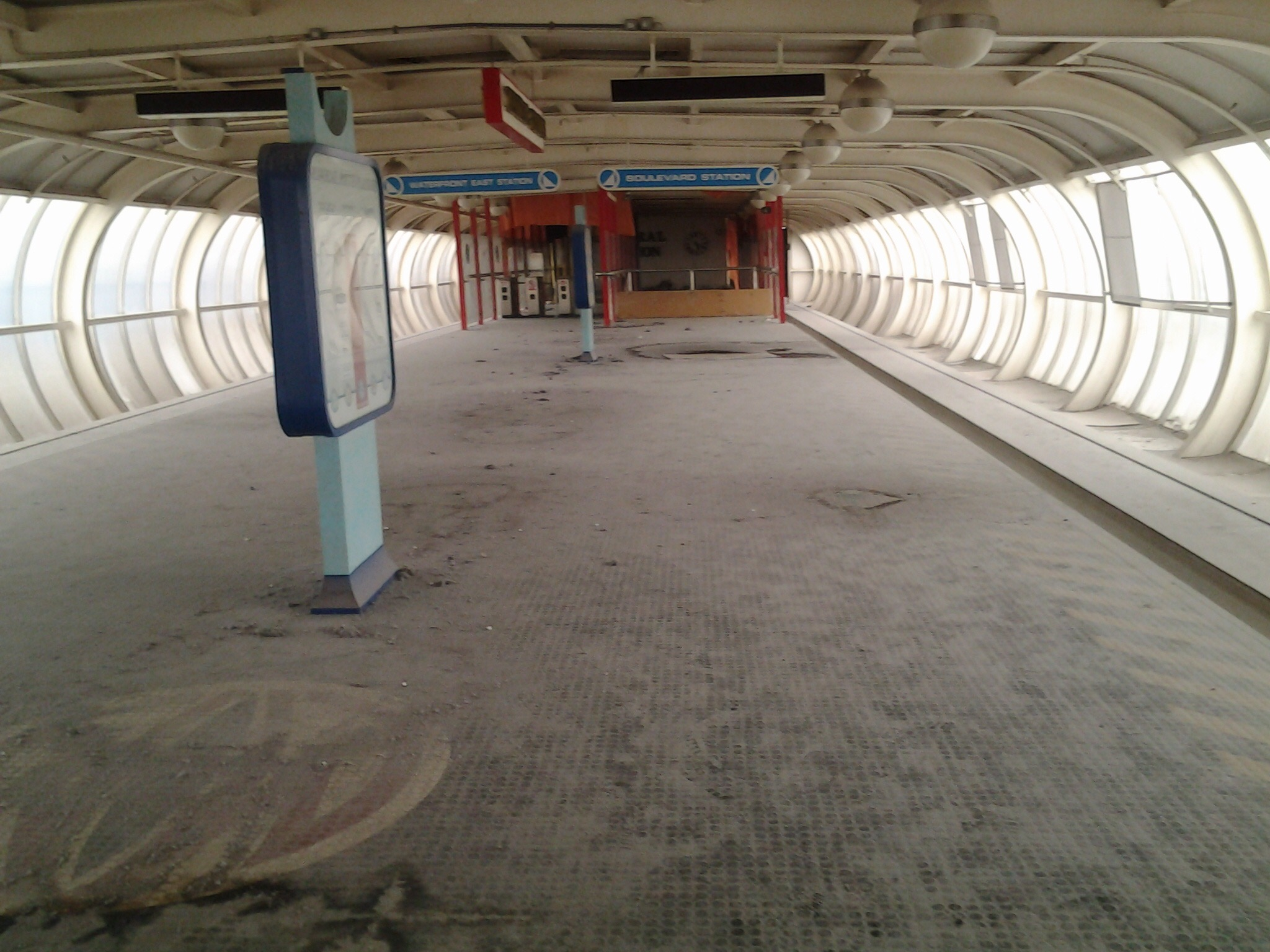
Central Station in 2013. Very well preserved—albeit dust covered

After the system was put up for sale in 1996, the trains and track were transferred in 2001 to the Oasis Shopping Centre, in Broadbeach, Queensland, Australia, to enable expansion of its own monorail system (which was later closed in 2017). The remaining monorail station, Central Station, was perfectly preserved, but owing to renewed interest in 2016 surrounding the 25th anniversary of its opening artefacts were removed from the station and placed in a memorial exhibition near the lift shaft which once gave access to it. One hundred and fifty commemorative coins were minted and sold at the exhibition.

By the end of the monorail's life at the centre, tickets for adults cost 40p while children under the age of 5 enjoyed free travel on the network. A "monorail replacement bus" service operated between the UCI Cinema (now Odeon) and The Waterfront car parks once the monorail ceased operating, using two Travel Merry Hill-owned MCW Metrobuses.

== In culture ==
The areas around Next, TK Maxx, H&M, Eat Central, the amphitheatre and outside Debenhams at Merry Hill made an appearance on the popular Cartoon Network show The Amazing World of Gumball as "Elmore Mall" in the episode called "The Mothers"; Eat Central also made an appearance in the episode called "The Burden". Interior and exterior shots of Merry Hill have also featured in subsequent episodes.

Working at Merry Hill gave Catherine O'Flynn the inspiration for the fictional Green Oaks centre, the main location in her successful novel What Was Lost.

The former Sainsbury's at Merry Hill was featured in the third episode of the first series of the popular children's television programme Rosie and Jim, called "Supermarket", which was originally broadcast on ITV on 17 September 1990, and featured the boat's owner, John Cunliffe, going shopping at Sainsbury's, with the ragdolls Rosie and Jim in tow.
