= Paul Bloomfield =

Paul Bloomfield may refer to:

- Paul Bloomfield (businessman) (1946–2016), British businessman
- Paul Bloomfield (philosopher), American philosopher

== See also ==
- Paul Blomfield (born 1953), British politician
