= Saif Durbar =

- Born: Saifee Durbar; 1961 (age 64–65); Gujarat, India
- Other name: Saifee Durbar
- Occupations: Businessman, investor, and property developer

Saif Durbar (born 1961) is an Indian-born Pakistani-Central African businessman, investor, and property developer. He served as a key adviser to the former presidents of the Central African Republic Ange Felix Patasse and François Bozizé. From 2008 to 2009, he was the Deputy Minister of Foreign Affairs in the Central African Republic.

Durbar is the founder and chief executive officer of Girc, Bridge Africa Counselage, and founder of philanthropic organisation Kutamani, which provides educational tools for students in Africa.

== Life and career ==
Saif Durbar was born in 1961 in Gujarat, India, close to the Pakistan border. After the decolonisation of India in 1947, his family remained close to the British, and was also closely connected to Gulf monarchies. Following his studies in England and Pakistan, he joined the family manufacturing, textile, steel, plastics, and packaging businesses. In 1987, he returned to the U.K. to start his own import export business, and eventually expanded in bond trading and banking.

In 1993, Durbar started working in Africa, developing businesses in infrastructure and real estate in Zaire until the fall of Mobutu Sese Seko in 1997. Throughout his business dealings in Africa, he has been close to several of the heads of states on the continent, including Mobutu, Laurent-Désiré Kabila, Omar Bongo, François Bozizé, and Alpha Condé.

After the loss of nearly a billion dollars in 1995, Durbar expanded projects in mining and property development with large capitalisation. He continued to create businesses in the Central African Republic, attracting international investors to the region. Durbar became an economic adviser to President Ange-Félix Patassé from 1999 until the end of 2000, whom he represented at the United Nations as well.

In 2005, Dubar along with Paul Bloomfield, announced the US$13 billion (£7.4 billion) partnership between Bovis Lend Lease and Foster & Partners to develop a new city in Saudi Arabia which included a plan for 750,000 new homes. He also took part in setting up The Saudi Construction Group. Previously, he started a property fund and was involved in several large property deals in Britain and Europe.

In 2006, Durbar became an advisor to President François Bozizé, and in 2009 was appointed Deputy Minister of Foreign Affairs.

== Controversies ==
Durbar was the adviser of François Bozize, when the Canadian company Uramin acquired 90 percent of the Bakouma uranium mine.

In 2007, the French state-owned nuclear company Areva purchased Uramin and its mines for 1.8 billion euros. According to Durbar, the acquisition took place without notification of change of ownership to the CAR government who owned 15 percent of Uramin. Durbar advised the government to appoint lawyers to give notice to Areva to justify the transaction. The mines were later proved unusable because of their low uranium concentration and the expensive logistics involved, which Areva's CEO Anne Lauvergeon was aware of at the time of the purchase of Uramin. This brought about allegations of possible corruption.

In August 2007, one month after the CAR government issued its notice to Areva to justify the Uramin transaction, the French government issued a warrant against Durbar following the appeal of his 1995 fraud conviction.

In October 2008 the US ambassador to Bangui reported France's desire "to limit the influence of Saiffee Durbar, including by using the legal proceedings against him". To protect Durbar, President Bozizé appointed him Deputy Minister of Foreign Affairs, offering him diplomatic immunity and Central African citizenship. Following pressure from France he left the position. At the end of 2009, after his resignation as Deputy Minister of Foreign Affairs, he went to France to defend himself and to negotiate his extradition. He was placed on probation for six months under house arrest in a Paris apartment. Durbar left France at the end of his probation period in September 2010. He still works in Africa and other parts of the world with a focus on mining, infrastructure, real estate and the oil sectors.

In 2014, Vincent Crouzet published a book Radioactive about the Uramin scandal with Saif Durbar as one of the main protagonists and a key witness.

== See also ==
- Jan Bonde Nielsen
