= Travel Merry Hill =

Bus operator

- Parent: National Express Group
- Founded: 1987
- Ceased operation: 2001
- Headquarters: Birmingham
- Service area: West Midlands
- Service type: Bus services

Travel Merry Hill was a bus operator in the West Midlands. It was a subsidiary of National Express.

== History ==
In 1988, the Merry Hill Minibus company was formed by the former owners of the Merry Hill Centre, Richardson Developments.

Originally launched to compete with West Midlands Passenger Transport Executive's Mini Buzz service, at that time the Merry Hill Minibuses were the major form of public transport linking the surrounding areas with the shopping centre, of which approximately half had been opened by the time the service was launched (the first retailers had moved to the centre in 1985 and it was completed in 1989).

In the early days, the fleet consisted of Carlyle Works bodied Freight Rover Sherpa vehicles. An attraction to customers of the Merry Hill Minibus service was that the buses gave change to passengers not having the exact fare, which was not the case with the incumbent West Midlands Travel. The company intended to operate around 100 vehicles from the time of the centre's completion in November 1989, but stalled at 46 following the early 1990s recession. An unusual further attraction was that all the drivers wore bow-ties.

=== National Express takeover ===
In April 1997, Merry Hill Minibuses was purchased by Travel West Midlands, the new identity of West Midlands Travel following its purchase by National Express, who retained the company as a separate subsidiary named Travel Merry Hill. The operating centre was moved in 1999 from the back of the Merry Hill Centre to the Pensnett Trading Estate in Dudley. Subsequently, the garage was relocated to a larger location elsewhere on the Estate to cater for an increased allocation of vehicles. The routes were mostly withdrawn and the fleet used standard West Midlands Travel buses such as Leyland Nationals and MCW Metrobuses.

On 17 February 2001, following a group restructuring, the Travel Merry Hill services were absorbed into Travel West Midlands with the Travel Merry Hill brand dropped.
