= Mohammad Ghadami =

Iranian-born British property developer (born 1954)

- Born: March 1954 (age 72); Harlow

Mohammad Reza Ghadami (born March 1954) is an Iranian-born British property developer based in Harlow, Essex.

In 1995, Ghadami was convicted in the Crown Court at St Albans of two counts of being knowingly concerned in the fraudulent evasion of Value Added Tax.

In 2004, Ghadami was involved in a legal dispute with Harlow Council over the Harvey Centre in Harlow and other businesses that he owned that resulted in court proceedings.

In April 2014, a London court ordered British property investor Paul Bloomfield, who was an associate of Ghadami and has since died, to pay Ghadami £110m in damages.

== See also ==
- Jan Bonde Nielsen
