= Round Oak Steelworks =

Coordinates: 52.486°N 2.114°W

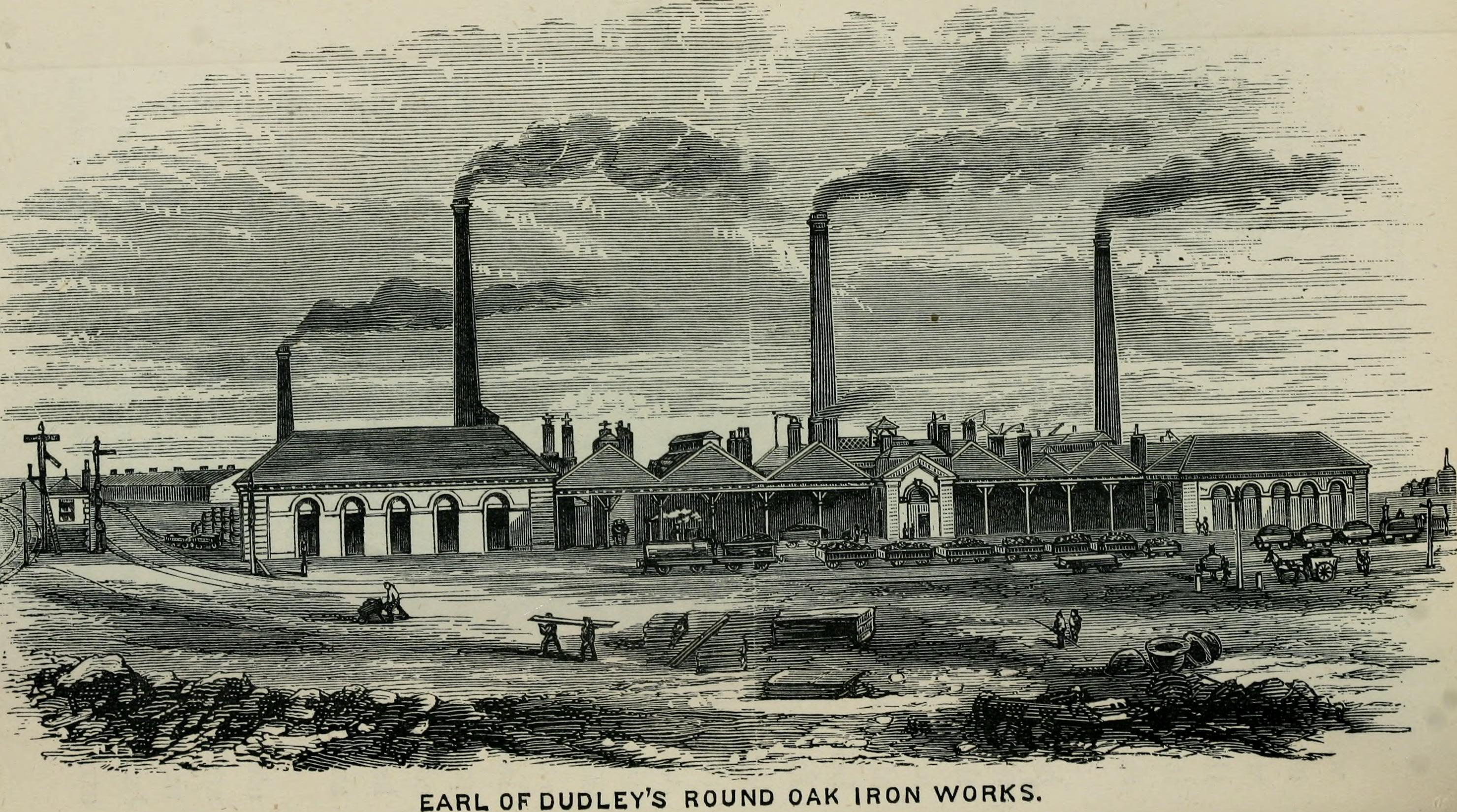
- The Round Oak Ironworks in the 1870s
- Interactive map of the Round Oak Steelworks area
- Former names: The Round Oak Ironworks

General information
- Type: Steelworks
- Location: Brierley Hill, United Kingdom
- Opened: 1857
- Closed: 1982
- Demolished: 1984

The Round Oak Steelworks was a steel production plant in Brierley Hill, West Midlands (formerly Staffordshire), England. It was founded in 1857 by Lord Ward, who later became, in 1860, The 1st Earl of Dudley, as an outlet for pig iron made in the nearby blast furnaces. During the Industrial Revolution, the majority of iron-making in the world was carried out within 32 kilometres of Round Oak. For the first decades of operation, the works produced wrought iron. However, in the 1890s, steelmaking was introduced. At its peak, thousands of people were employed at the works. The steelworks was the first in the United Kingdom to be converted to natural gas, which was supplied from the North Sea. The works were nationalized in 1951, privatized in 1953 and nationalized again in 1967 although the private firm Tube Investments continued to part manage the operations at the site. The steelworks closed in December 1982.

== History ==
=== The Round Oak Iron Works ===
The Ward family, Lords of Dudley Castle, came to own and control a wide range of industrial concerns in the Black Country of the nineteenth century. The family owned land in the region as well as extensive mineral rights. In 1855, the Dudley Estate commenced the construction of the Round Oak Iron Works at Brierley Hill under the supervision of the estate's mineral agent, Richard Smith. The site was next to the Dudley Canal and two railway systems: the public railway run by the Oxford, Worcester and Wolverhampton Railway and the Pensnett Railway, a mineral line owned by the Dudley Estate itself. Also nearby were the Level New Furnaces (also known as the New Level Furnaces) where blast furnaces, owned by the Dudley Estate could supply pig iron for the new iron works at Round Oak. The iron works commenced production in 1857. It was a large-scale operation: on its opening it employed 600 men, and the equipment included 28 puddling furnaces and five mills. In 1862, the works won a Prize Medal at the International Exhibition. The works were extended between 1865 and 1868, and were then capable of producing 550 tons of finished iron per week.

In 1889, the company started producing chains and ships' cables.

=== Steel production ===
Demand for iron began to fall from the 1870s as steel production began to compete with traditional iron products, and it was decided to convert the plant to steel production. In 1890, the Dudley Estate sold the iron works to a new public company, which would aim to convert to steel production. The price of the works was set at £110,000 of which £10,000 was paid in cash and the remainder by a mortgage provided by the Dudley estate itself. The company passed to the Lancashire Trust and Mortgage Insurance Corporation Limited, which floated the shares in the firm to the public, receiving £135,000. The new company was called the Earl of Dudley's Round Oak Iron and Steel Works and was incorporated on 16 April 1891. The chairman of the new company was Mr Richard Dalgleish and the managing director was Mr R. Smith Casson. Steel was first produced in August 1894. However, the company had run into financial difficulty and on 26 November 1894, the company went into liquidation, resulting in repossession by the Dudley Estate. A new company, The Earl of Dudley's Round Oak Works Ltd, was established on 15 July 1897 under the ownership of the Dudley family. The chairman of the new company was The 2nd Earl of Dudley, and the managing director was George Hatton.

The steel plant, built next to the ironworks, included three 17-ton furnaces of the open-hearth type, a 30-inch cogging mill and a 28-inch finishing mill.

In 1904, the works were described as consisting of: "iron works for the manufacture of high-class bar iron; chain works for the manufacture of chain; and steel works for the manufacture of Siemens-Martin steel in bars of every variety of section". It was also stated that the steelworks "comprise five large open-hearth-steel melting furnaces, standing in a shop 350 ft. long by 90 ft. wide." The Bertrand-Thiel process of making steel was being used at the works.

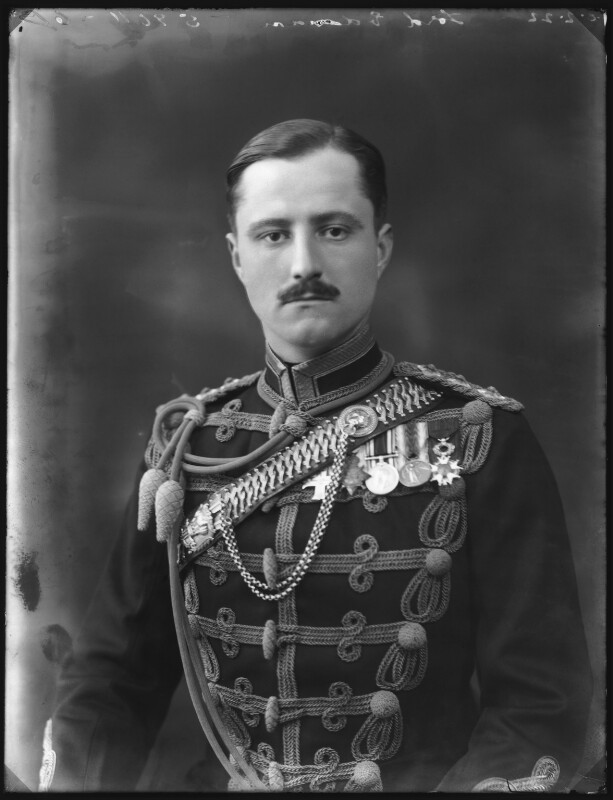
The then Viscount Ednam, who later became The 3rd Earl of Dudley, brought about the management changes that improved the prospects of the steelworks in the 1920s

The works prospered until just after the First World War when the firm faced a financial crisis due to a national depression combined with weaknesses at the plant itself It was the Earl's son, the then Viscount Ednam, who tackled the problems by taking specialist financial advice. In 1923, a new board of directors was constituted.

In 1927, it was reported that the equipment at the plant included a 90-ton tilting furnace, two 50-ton and three 40-ton fixed open-hearth furnaces, in addition to a 30-inch cogging mill and a 28-inch finishing mill.

The company's name was changed to Round Oak Steel Works Limited on 14 December 1936.

At the end of the Second World War, it was found necessary to carry out a modernisation of the plant, which cost over £4,000,000, the financing coming from the Finance Corporation for Industry Limited.

The works were nationalised by the British Government in 1951, but were sold to Tube Investments in 1953. Tube Investments paid £1.4 million and took responsibility for the repayment of loans totaling £4.2million. The chairman of Tube Investments, Ivan Stedeford, took over as chairman of Round Oak Steel Works.

Steel was produced at the works using basic electric arc and open hearth methods. Principal products included alloy and carbon steel bars (case hardening, bright drawing, free cutting, machining, hot and cold forging), special sections, railway bearing plates, rounds, squares, flats, angles, channels, joists, billets, blooms, slabs and large forging ingots. Round Oak manufactured a weldable extra high-strength steel under the brand name, 'Thirty-Oak'.

The 3½ mile-long railway between the steelworks and Baggeridge closed in September 1966.

The plant was re-nationalized in 1967, becoming part of British Steel although the works continued to be part managed by Tube Investments.

By the 1970s, the plant's future was in doubt and the workforce was shrinking. The plant had employed around 3,000 workers at its peak, but by 1982 that figure had fallen to around 1,200.

An image of the works was used for the cover art for the Depeche Mode album Some Great Reward released in 1984.

=== Closure ===
By the late 1970s, jobs were being axed at the plant, which had employed around 2,500 people at its peak, and British Steel was planning to close it down completely.

The plant finally closed on 23 December 1982, after 125 years of steel production, with the loss of more than 1,200 jobs. Brierley Hill had already been hit hard by the economic downturn of the late 1970s and early 1980s, but the closure of Round Oak saw unemployment in the town peak at around 25% — one of the highest rates of any town or city in Britain at this time. The closure came in spite of a fierce argument by local Conservative MP John Blackburn that the plant was still profitable and should be retained. Demolition work took place during 1984, when the land purchased by Don and Roy Richardson, who in October that year were given the go-ahead to build a shopping complex on nearby farmland.

=== Redevelopment of the site ===
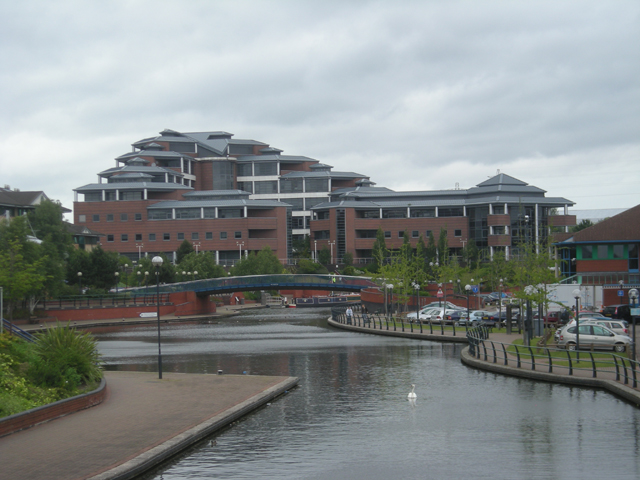
This canalside block at the Waterfront development in Brierley Hill occupies part of the former steelworks site. The canal basin once served the works

The farmland which stood in the shadow of Round Oak Steelworks was designated by the Government as an Enterprise Zone in 1980, being extended to include the site of the works in 1984 — the same year that the Round Oak buildings were demolished. In October 1984, Dudley Metropolitan Borough Council approved the plans of local twin brothers Don and Roy Richardson to build a retail park and shopping mall on the farmland. The first retail units were occupied in the autumn of 1985, and by April 1986 the first phase of the Merry Hill Shopping Centre had been completed. The site was gradually expanded until the final phase opened in November 1989.

Merry Hill brought thousands of jobs to the local area and spearheaded a region-wide transition from manufacturing to services as the key employer of local workers, although many of the new shopping centre's jobs were occupied by people who had worked in other locations - mostly Dudley town centre = until the retailers decided to relocate to new units at Merry Hill.

The first businesses did not move onto the steelworks site until December 1990, when new offices were completed as part of the Waterfront development.

Despite the closure of the works in 1982, a steel terminal was opened on the adjacent railway in August 1986 and is still in use.
