= Queensway (retailer) =

Queensway was a retailer in the United Kingdom that specialised in the sale of carpets and furniture. It was a pioneer of out of town shopping and one of the first retailers in the U.K. to sell directly to customers from a warehouse.

It was founded in 1967 by Anthony Parish in Norwich with £50. Within a few months Queensway moved to a nearby disused warehouse. Parish's strategy was to sell carpets in the same way supermarkets sell food. The success of this approach enabled the company to rapidly expand to 26 branches in 1970 and by 1975, it had 38 branches across the country.

In the mid-1970s it was due to float with an expected market capitalisation of around £7 million but due to a serious downturn in the economy the float was withdrawn. Managing director Anthony Parish was by now was suffering from ill health and, after a boardroom coup, the company was sold to Phillip Harris in 1977 and it became Harris Queensway plc.

On 20 December 1985, Queensway opened a store at the Merry Hill Shopping Centre in the West Midlands, becoming one of the complex's first tenants and following the trend of big retail names moving to out-of-town outlets which began around this time. Within four years it was part of Europe's largest indoor shopping centre.

In 1988 Harris Queensway was valued at £450 million and the company was sold to become Lowndes Queensway. Lowndes Queensway went bankrupt in 1992 as a result of the downturn in sales brought on by the recession, but later became part of Allied Carpets.
