= Richard Smith (mining engineer) =

Canadian engineer and politician

Member of the Nova Scotia House of Assembly
- In office 1833–1834
- Constituency: Cape Breton County

Personal details
- Born: January 30, 1783 Tipton, Staffordshire, England
- Died: July 21, 1868 (aged 85) near Lichfield, Staffordshire, England
- Spouse: Elizabeth Fereday
- Children: Frederick Smith
- Education: Royal School of Mines
- Occupation: Mining engineer, industrialist, politician

Richard Smith (January 30, 1783 – July 21, 1868) was an English-born mining engineer, industrialist and politician. He represented Cape Breton County in the Nova Scotia House of Assembly from 1833 to 1834. Between 1836 and 1864, Smith was the mineral agent for the estate of the Lords of Dudley.

== Life ==
Richard Smith was born in Tipton, Staffordshire, the son of Thomas Smith and Mary Morris, and was educated at the Royal School of Mines.

In 1811, he married Elizabeth Fereday. Smith and his father-in-law suffered financial losses when the coal and iron market collapsed at the end of the Napoleonic Wars. He subsequently set himself up in business again in London and also managed coal operations in Wales and Portugal. In 1824 he was engaged by Baron Rothschild to manage his estates in North and South Wales. In 1827, Smith was hired to establish coal mining operations in Nova Scotia for the General Mining Association. He established sites at Albion Mines (later Stellarton), Sydney Mines, Bridgeport and Little Bras d'Or. Smith contested a new assembly seat for Cape Breton in a violent election held in 1832 where William Young's supporters intimidated voters at some polls; he was declared elected to the assembly in 1833 after Young's election was overturned.

In 1834, he returned to England. Smith managed the mineral holdings of the Earl of Dudley from 1836 to 1864, taking over from Francis Downing. The Dudley Estate was extensive and included coal, limestone and iron ore mines and blast furnaces in the Black Country region of England. Richard Smith oversaw the construction of a private railway network for the estate. as well as the construction of the Round Oak Ironworks.

Richard Smith retired as the Earl of Dudley's mineral agent in 1864, being succeeded in the post by his son, Frederick Smith. Richard's final residence was Berry Hill, near Lichfield. He died near Lichfield, Staffordshire at the age of 85.
