= Arthur Ryan =

Irish businessman, founder of Primark

- Born: Arthur St. John Ryan; 18 July 1935; Dublin, Ireland
- Died: 8 July 2019 (aged 83); Dublin, Ireland
- Occupation: Businessman
- Years active: 1962–2019
- Title: Founder & Chairman of Primark

Arthur St. John Ryan (18 July 1935 – 8 July 2019) was an Irish businessman who was the founder, chairman, and chief executive of Primark. The business was founded as Penneys and continues to trade under that name in the Republic of Ireland.

== Early life ==
Arthur Ryan was born the son of a Cork-born insurance clerk in 1935, and went to the Synge Street CBS in Dublin after moving to the city with his family. After emigrating to London, he entered the genteel world of gentlemen's tailoring as a tie buyer at Swan & Edgar. He also worked for London fashion wholesaler Carr & McDonald. From there, he returned to Dublin and a job at Dunnes Stores in Cornelscourt.

== Business career ==
Ryan opened the first Penneys shop on Mary Street in Dublin in 1969. Subsequently, in 1974, he took the model to Britain, initially under the Penneys brand, but following a trademark dispute with the American retailer JC Penney, the shops outside the Republic of Ireland were rebranded as Primark. The major turnaround came in 2005, when Primark acquired a huge portfolio of Littlewoods stores. Meanwhile, close attention to catwalk trends made it chic as well as cheap. It went from being the "shop that nobody admitted going to" to a Mecca for celebrity shoppers. It now accounts for over a third of parent company Associated British Foods' (ABF) operating profits. In 2009, Ryan gave up his day-to-day control of the firm as chief executive but became chairman instead.

== Personal life ==
Arthur St John Ryan was married to the former entertainer (The Swarbriggs/Alma Carroll) and had a daughter Jess Ryan. Ryan additionally had four children from his first marriage, Colin, Barry, Arthur and Alison Ryan. He was an intensely private man, living in one of Dublin's best-protected houses, he never gave interviews and was rarely seen in public without bodyguards. His great fear was kidnap – a real enough threat for Irish retail magnates during the Troubles. In 1981, the IRA snatched department store boss Ben Dunne; two years later, they tried to kidnap Galen Weston, scion of the Canadian family behind Primark's owner, food and retail conglomerate Associated British Foods (ABF). Ryan took no chances. "His daily schedule is kept secret from all but his closest aides."[5] Ryan's son, Barry, who was 51, died while attempting to save his son and his son's girlfriend from drowning during a freak accident on 30 June 2015. Barry's son and his girlfriend also died during the rescue bid.

== Death ==
Ryan died of a short illness on 8 July 2019, 10 days before his 84th birthday.
