= Paul Bloomfield (businessman) =

British property investor (1946–2016)

- Bloomfield
- Born: February 1946
- Died: April 2016
- Occupation: Property investor
- Known for: High-profile property deals; involvement with Mountleigh and Alton Towers

Paul Bloomfield (February 1946 – April 2016) was a British property investor known as "Boom-boom" Bloomfield.

== Career ==
Bloomfield was involved in a number of high-profile deals during the 1980s and was known as the man who sourced the transactions that made Tony Clegg's Mountleigh a stock market favourite in 1986–87.

In 1989, it emerged that he was the joint owner of the Alton Towers theme park and a leisure venture at Battersea Power Station after forming a joint venture, Alton International, with John Broome of the Alton Group. Broome had been struggling to complete the Battersea project.

Bloomfield became bankrupt during the 1990s property crash. He later moved to Russia, where he made a number of successful deals in the former Soviet states. He also helped to raise finance for the redevelopment of Wembley Stadium.

== See also ==
- Jan Bonde Nielsen
- Mohammad Ghadami
- Timur Kulibayev
