= Primark =

Irish multinational fast-fashion company

Primark Limited

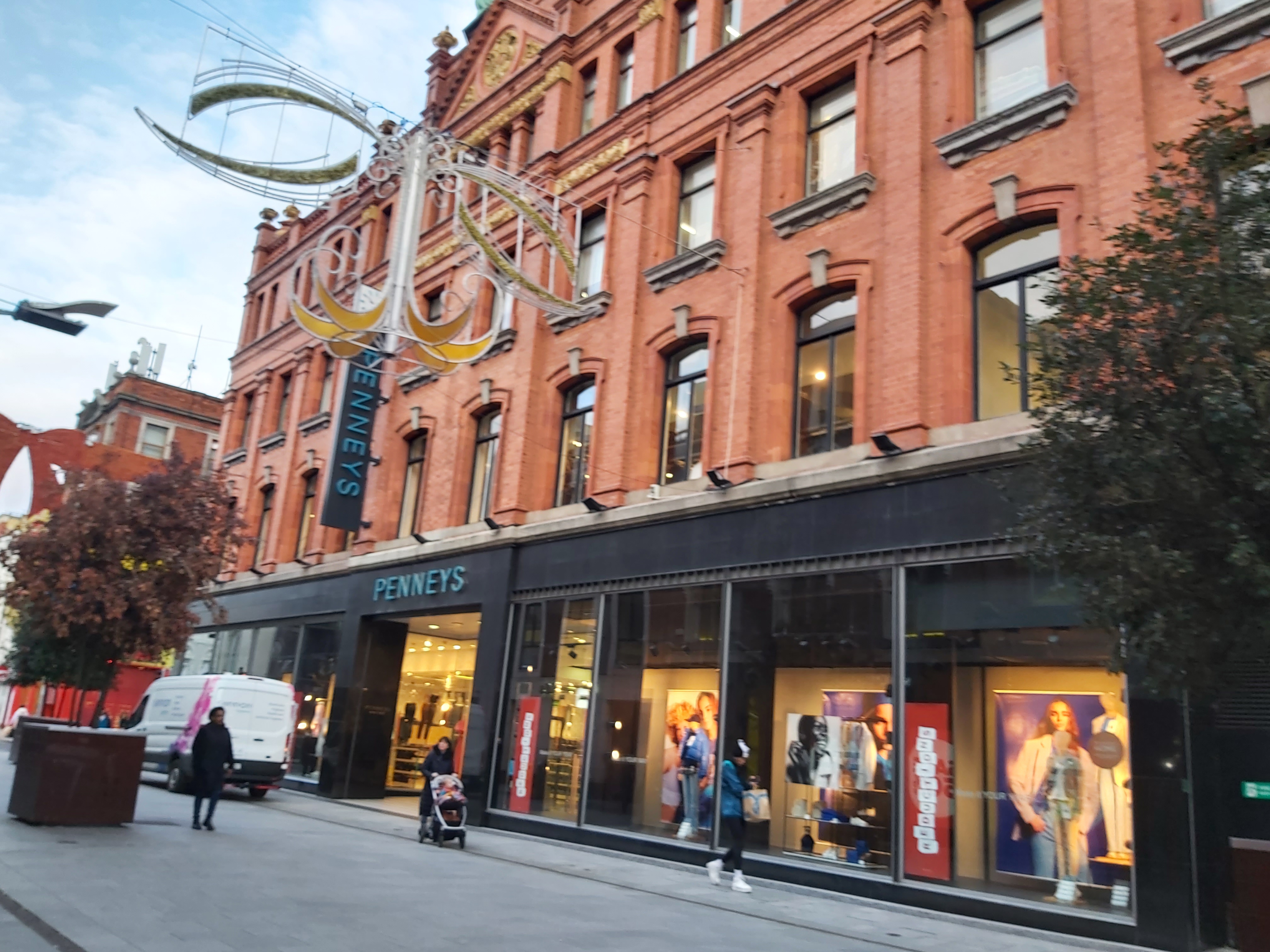
- The original shop on Mary Street, Dublin
- Trade name: Primark (outside Ireland); Penneys (in Ireland)
- Formerly: Penneys (outside of Ireland, 1969–1976)
- Type: Subsidiary
- Industry: Retail
- Founded: 13 June 1969; 57 years ago in Dublin, Ireland
- Founder: Arthur Ryan, Micaela Mitchell
- Headquarters: Arthur Ryan House, 22–24 Parnell Street, Dublin, Ireland
- Number of locations: 495 (as of 16 July 2026)
- Area served: Ireland; United Kingdom; Spain; The Netherlands; Portugal; Germany; Belgium; Austria; France; Italy; United States; Slovenia; Poland; Czech Republic; Romania; Hungary; Slovakia; Kuwait; United Arab Emirates
- Key people: Eoin Tonge (CEO)
- Products: Clothing; cosmetics; housewares
- Revenue: ▲£9,448 million (2024)
- Number of employees: ▲82,000 (2024)
- Parent: Associated British Foods
- Website: primark.com

The company's original logo introduced in 1969

The company's first Primark-branded logo introduced in 1974

Primark Limited (/ˈpraɪ.mɑːrk/; trading as Penneys in Ireland) is an Irish multinational retailer specialising in fast fashion. It is headquartered in Dublin, Ireland, with 491 shops in Europe and in the United States and 4 franchised shops in Kuwait and Dubai. The company was founded as Penneys; however, that brand hasn't been used outside of the Republic of Ireland since 1976 because of a trademark conflict with American retailer JCPenney. Primark is owned by Associated British Foods, with a corporate spin-off planned for late 2027.

Primark sells clothing, accessories and footwear, beauty products, housewares, and confectionery.

It is a member of the UN Fashion Charter and the Ethical Trading Initiative. As of 2025, 74% of its garments use recycled fibers.

The company has been criticised for sourcing products from suppliers with poor working conditions in investigations by War on Want, BBC News, as well as from notes found by alleged workers in clothing; however, some of these notes and footage have been determined to be fabricated or hoaxes.

== History ==
=== 20th century ===
The company's first shop, named Penneys and still in operation today, was established at 47 Mary Street in Dublin by Arthur Ryan and his business partner Micaela Mitchell in June 1969 on behalf of the Weston family, who had founded Allied Bakeries Limited in 1935, which was later renamed Associated British Foods (ABF).

The first major shops outside of Dublin were opened in the cities of Cork and Belfast in 1971, both under the name of Penneys.

The company opened a shop in Derby in 1973, marking its first expansion into Great Britain. By 1974, it had 24 shops, including three in Scotland and two in England, all operating under the Penneys brand.

JC Penney, an American company, opposed the use of Penneys as a business name. JC Penney registered the various business names of Penneys' parent company in countries throughout Europe, in order to put pressure on it to relinquish its registration of the Penneys brand, and issued court proceedings disputing the use of the brand. Following an injunction granted by the High Court of England in June 1974, the two shops in England were rebranded as Primark, named after the in-house clothing brand that had been introduced early on. However, the Penneys brand continued to be used in Ireland and Scotland, and in 1975–1976, four more Penneys-branded shops were opened in Scotland and Northern Ireland.

In a settlement of the trademark dispute, Penneys/Primark agreed that from 27 August 1976 onward, it would only use the Penneys brand in the Republic of Ireland, with its shops elsewhere, including in Northern Ireland, to be rebranded as Primark. In exchange, JC Penney agreed to relinquish its registration of the various business names of Primark's parent companies throughout Europe, and agreed not to trade under the Penneys brand in the Republic of Ireland. Since that date, it has been known as Penneys in the Republic of Ireland and as Primark elsewhere.

=== 21st century ===
In 2005, Primark acquired UK retailer Littlewoods's retail shops for £409 million, retaining 40 of the 119 shops and selling the remainder.

In May 2006, the first Primark shop in mainland Europe opened in Madrid, Spain. In December 2008, it expanded into the Netherlands, followed by Portugal, Germany and Belgium in 2009.

In January 2009, a supplier was forced by the Ethical Trading Initiative to remove its branding from Primark shops and websites following a BBC/The Observer investigation into the employment practices. The investigation alleged the use of illegal immigrant labour and argued that the workers were paid less than the UK legal minimum wage.

In July 2009, having led the company since its foundation in 1969, Arthur Ryan retired as Chief Executive and became Chairman instead. He was replaced as Chief Executive by the company's Chief Operating Officer, Paul Marchant.

Primark expanded into Austria in 2012, France in 2013, and Italy in 2014.

On 24 April 2013, in the Rana Plaza collapse, a manufacturing facility for Primark and other international brands, collapsed, killing 1,134 people. Primark was the largest contributor of compensation, paying over US$10 million for deceased, missing, and injured claims.

From 2014, Primark began selling makeup products.

Primark opened its current headquarters in 2015 in a redeveloped Dublin building, Arthur Ryan House, formerly Chapel House.

In 2015, Primark opened its first United States shop, in Boston.

Primark started selling vegan snacks from January 2018.

In April 2019, Primark opened its largest shop to date, occupying Birmingham's former Pavilions Shopping Centre of 161,000 sq ft (15,000 m^{2}), with five floors including a beauty salon, Disney-themed café and a barbershop, and adding the largest Greggs fast-food outlet in the world in February 2022. In June 2019, it expanded to Slovenia with a shop in Ljubljana.

In February 2020, Primark launched a Wellness collection, which includes 80 products made of organic, sustainable or recycled materials.

In August 2020, Primark opened its first shop in Poland, in the Galeria Młociny shopping centre in Warsaw. This was followed by shops in Poznań, Kraków, Katowice, Wrocław and Łódź in 2021. In June 2021, it opened its first shop in the Czech Republic, occupying an area of 50,590 sq ft (4,700 m^{2}) in Prague and serving as a flagship for the region of Central and Eastern Europe.

In November 2022, Primark introduced an online shopping service, inspired by losses during the COVID-19 lockdowns.

In December 2022, Primark expanded into Romania.

In May 2023, Primark opened its first shop in Slovakia.

In May 2024, Primark unveiled a new brand identity, revealing a more curved and bold logo based on its 2005 logo, along with changing the colour slightly.

In May 2024, Primark expanded into Hungary with a shop at Arena Mall in Budapest.

In June 2024, Primark opened an extension to its Colombo Centre, Lisbon shop, which, at 6,038 square metres (64,990 sq ft), made it the largest single-floor Primark shop in the world.

In March 2025, in Belfast, Primark opened its first ever standalone homeware shop.

In March 2025, Paul Marchant resigned as CEO of Primark following an investigation into inappropriate behaviour towards a woman in a social setting. Marchant admitted to an error in judgement, apologised to the individual, the ABF board and his colleagues, and accepted that his actions fell below the company's expected standards. Eoin Tonge, ABF's finance director, was appointed as interim CEO. Tonge was confirmed as permanent CEO in March 2026.

In May 2025, Primark entered into a franchise agreement with Alshaya Group to open four shops in the Arabian Peninsula, with one shop in Kuwait and three in Dubai. The shop in Kuwait opened in October 2025.

In August 2025, Primark launched a mobile app.

In April 2026, Associated British Foods announced the corporate spin-off of Primark, to take place by late 2027.

In September 2026, Primark announced that they plan to launch a home delivery service in Britain.

== Corporate affairs ==
Key trends for Primark (financial years ending 17 September)
Year	Revenue (£m)	Adjusted operating profit (£m)	Number of employees (1000s)	Number of shops	Number of served countries	Selling space (million sq ft)
2014	6,950	662	54	278	9	10.2
2015	5,347	673	61	293	10	11.1
2016	5,949	689	68	315	11	12.3
2017	7,053	735	73	345	11	13.8
2018	7,477	843	75	360	11	14.8
2019	7,792	913	78	373	12	15.6
2020	5,895	362	70	384	13	16.2
2021	5,593	321	71	398	14	16.8
2022	7,697	756	72	408	14	17.3
2023	9,008	735	76	432	16	18.1
2024	9,448	1,108	82	451	17	18.7
2025	9,489	1,126	82.6	473	17	19.5

Primark shops by country
Country	Number of shops as of 16 July 2026
United Kingdom	183-200
Spain	66
United States	43
Republic of Ireland	37
France	30
Germany	28
Italy	20
Netherlands	19
Portugal	13
Belgium	8
Poland	8
Romania	6
Austria	5
Czech Republic	3
United Arab Emirates	3
Slovenia	1
Hungary	1
Slovakia	1
Kuwait	1
Total	495

== In popular media ==
In January 2024, RTÉ broadcast a six-part documentary, entitled Inside Penneys, exploring the workings of the company.

== Gallery ==
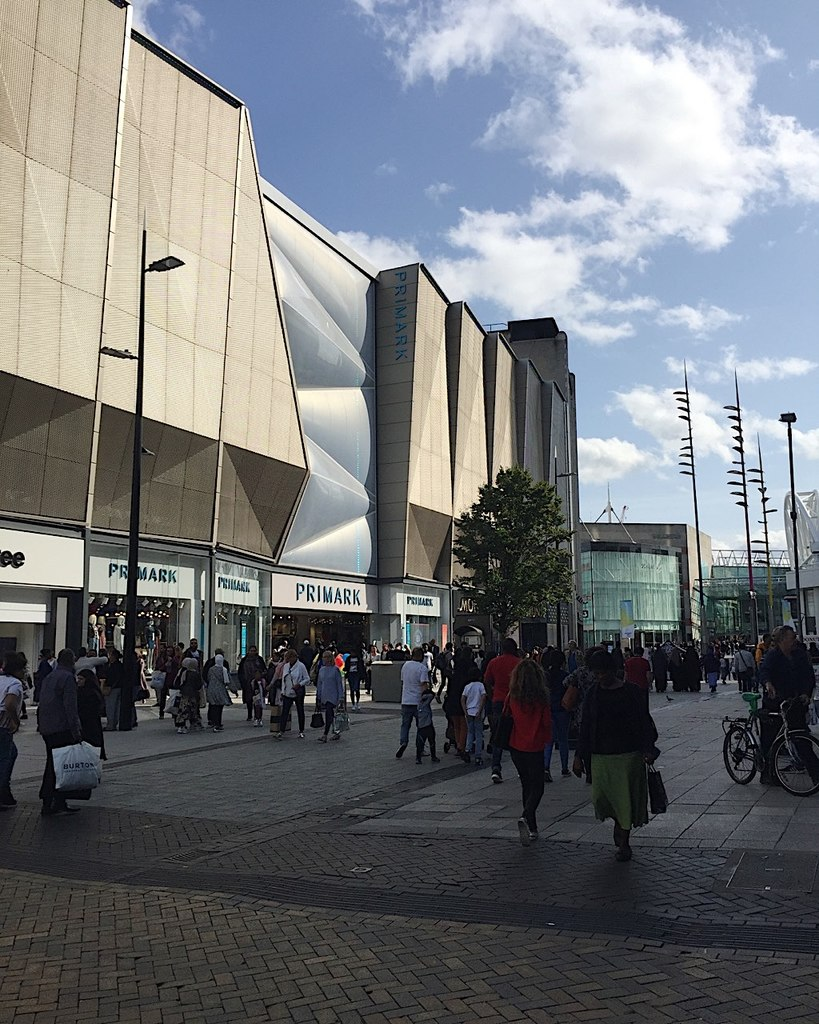
Primark shop at High Street in Birmingham, England, the largest in the chain

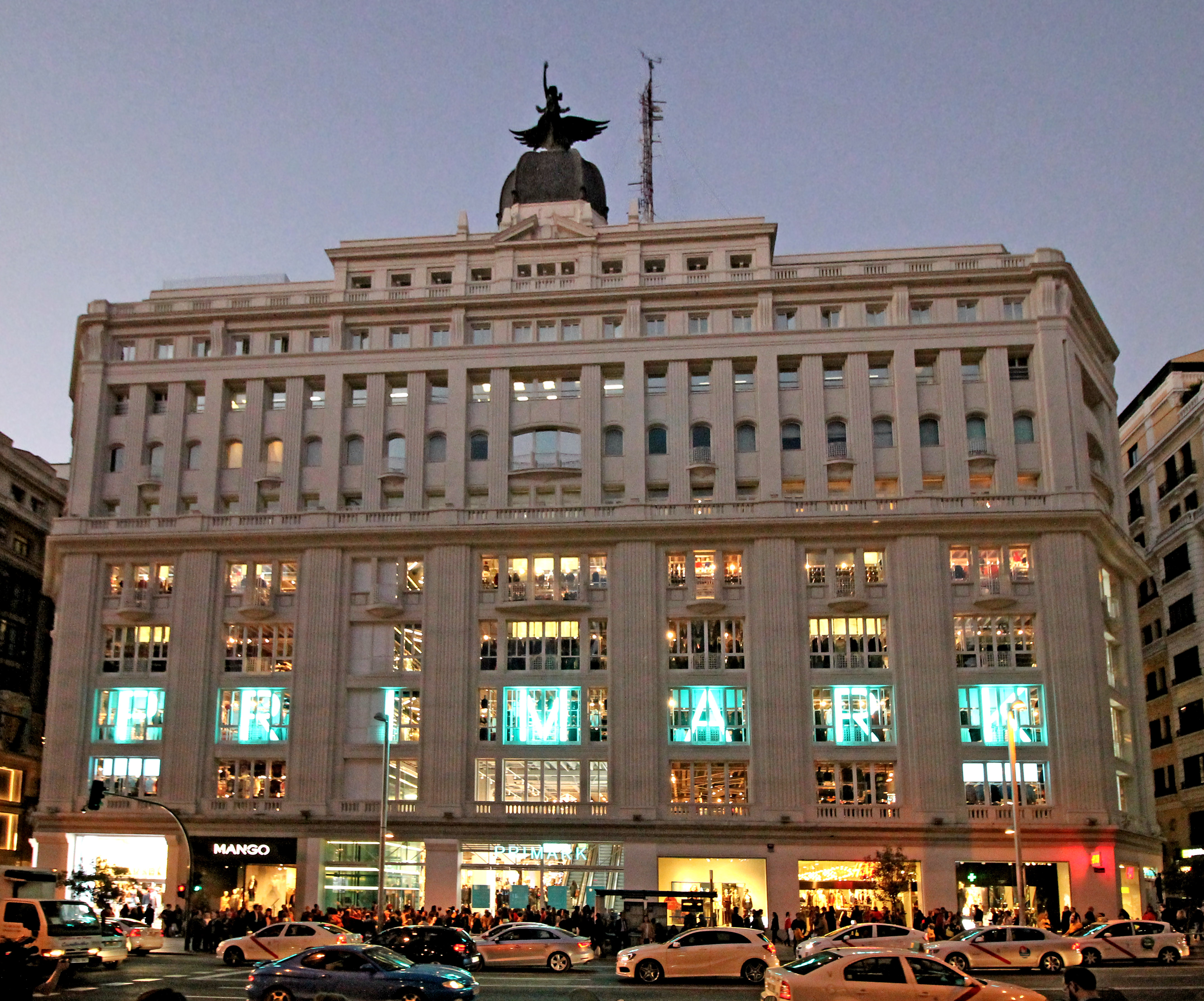
Primark shop at Gran Vía in Madrid, Spain, the second-largest in the chain

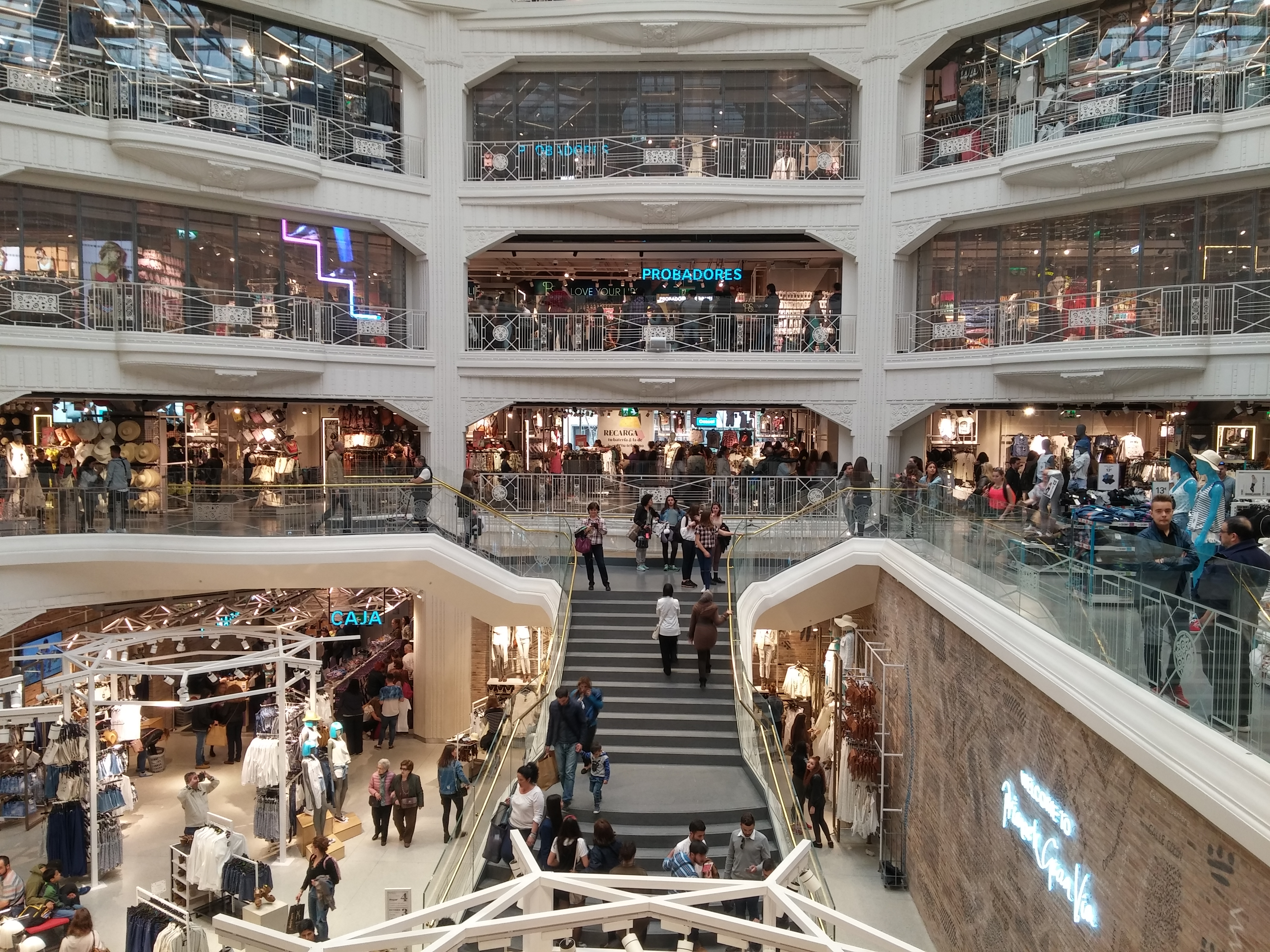
Interior of the Primark shop at Gran Vía in Madrid, Spain

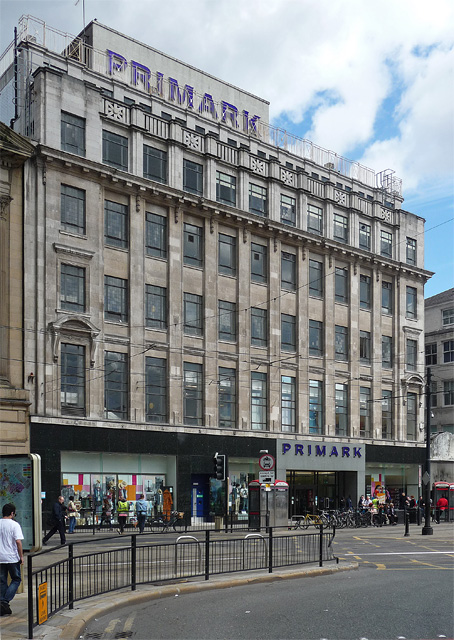
Primark in the former Lewis's Building in Manchester city centre, Manchester, England

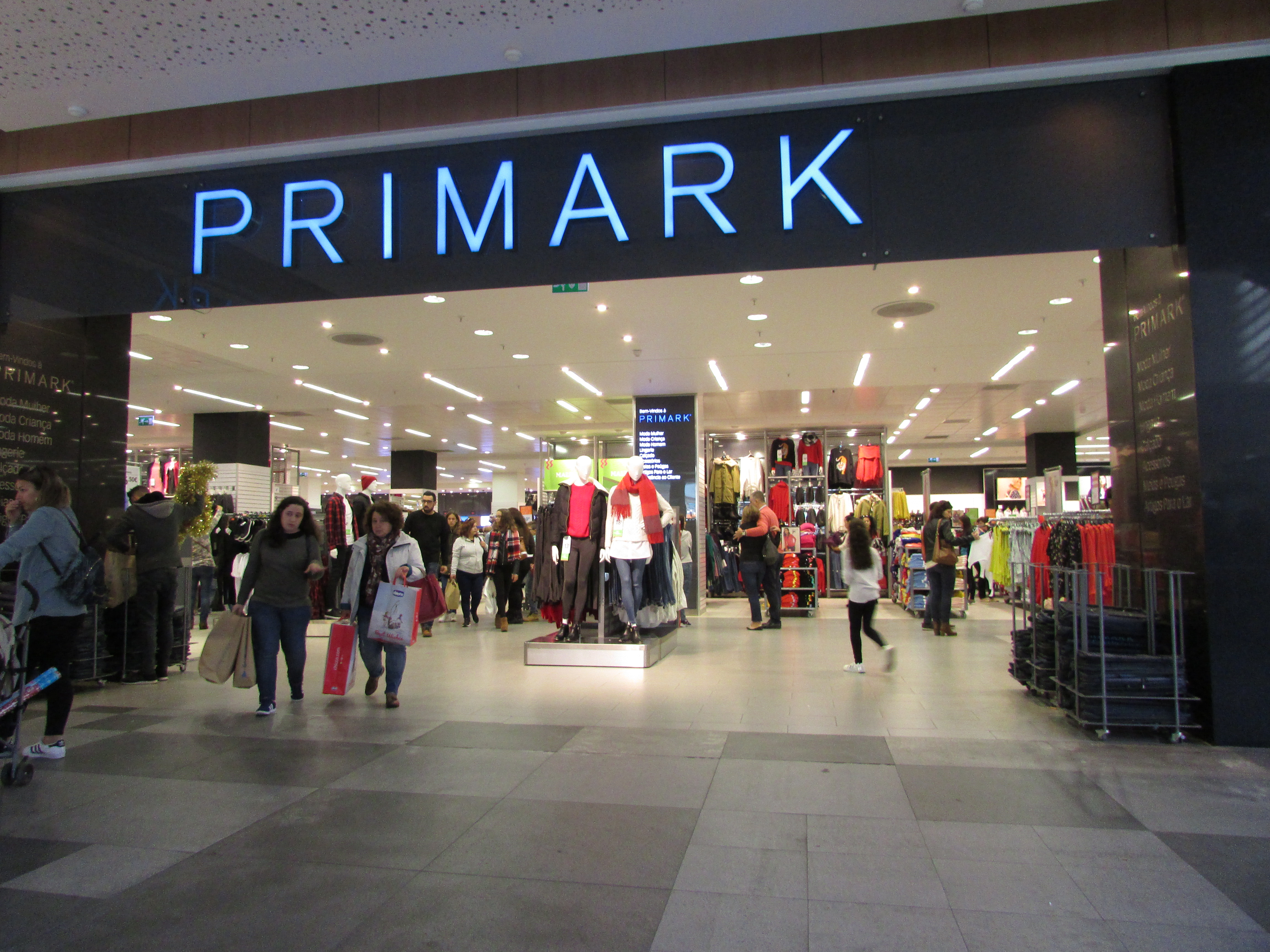
Primark in the Aqua Shopping Centre, Portimão, Algarve region, Portugal

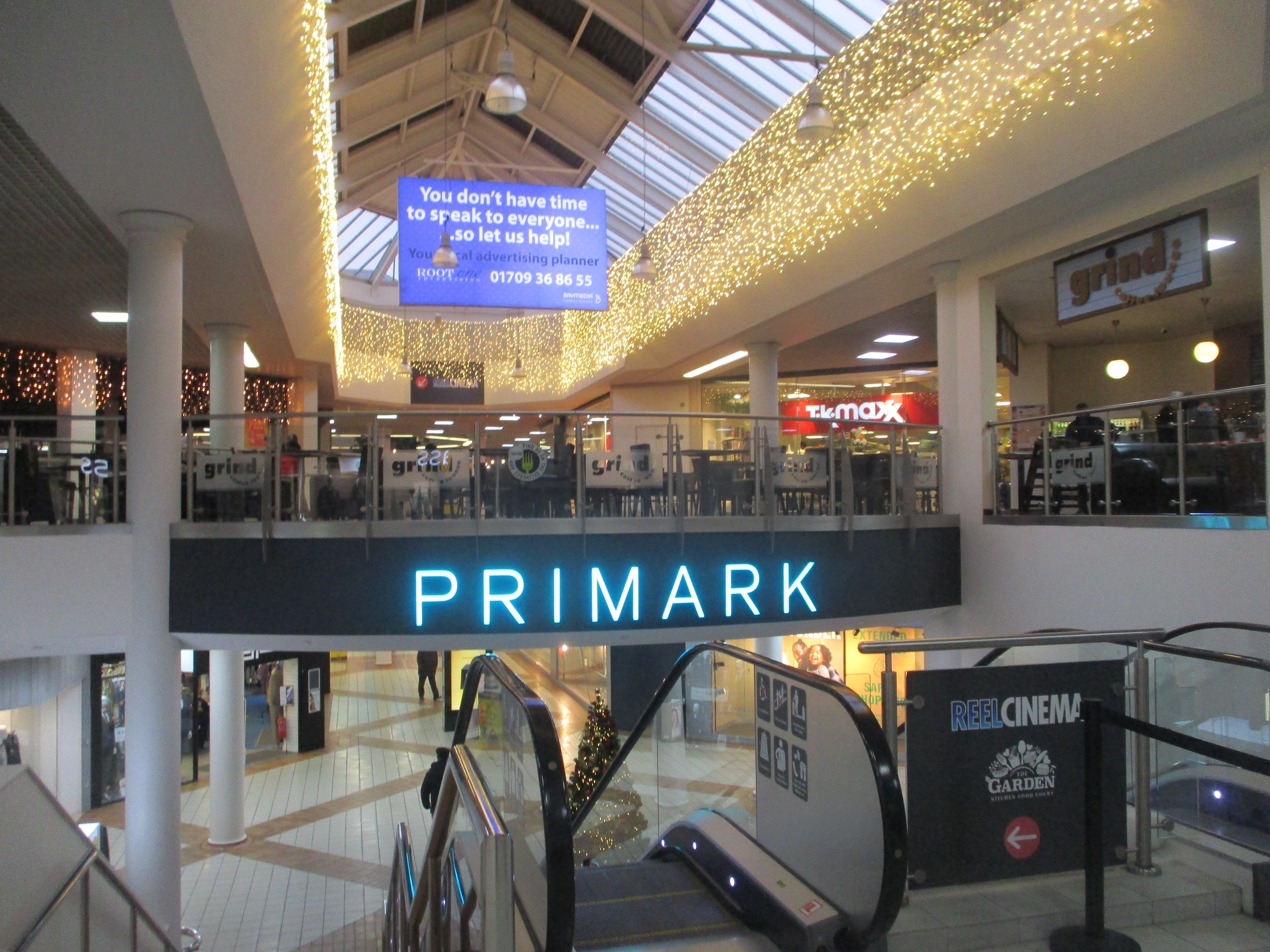
Primark in the Ridings Centre, Wakefield, West Yorkshire, England

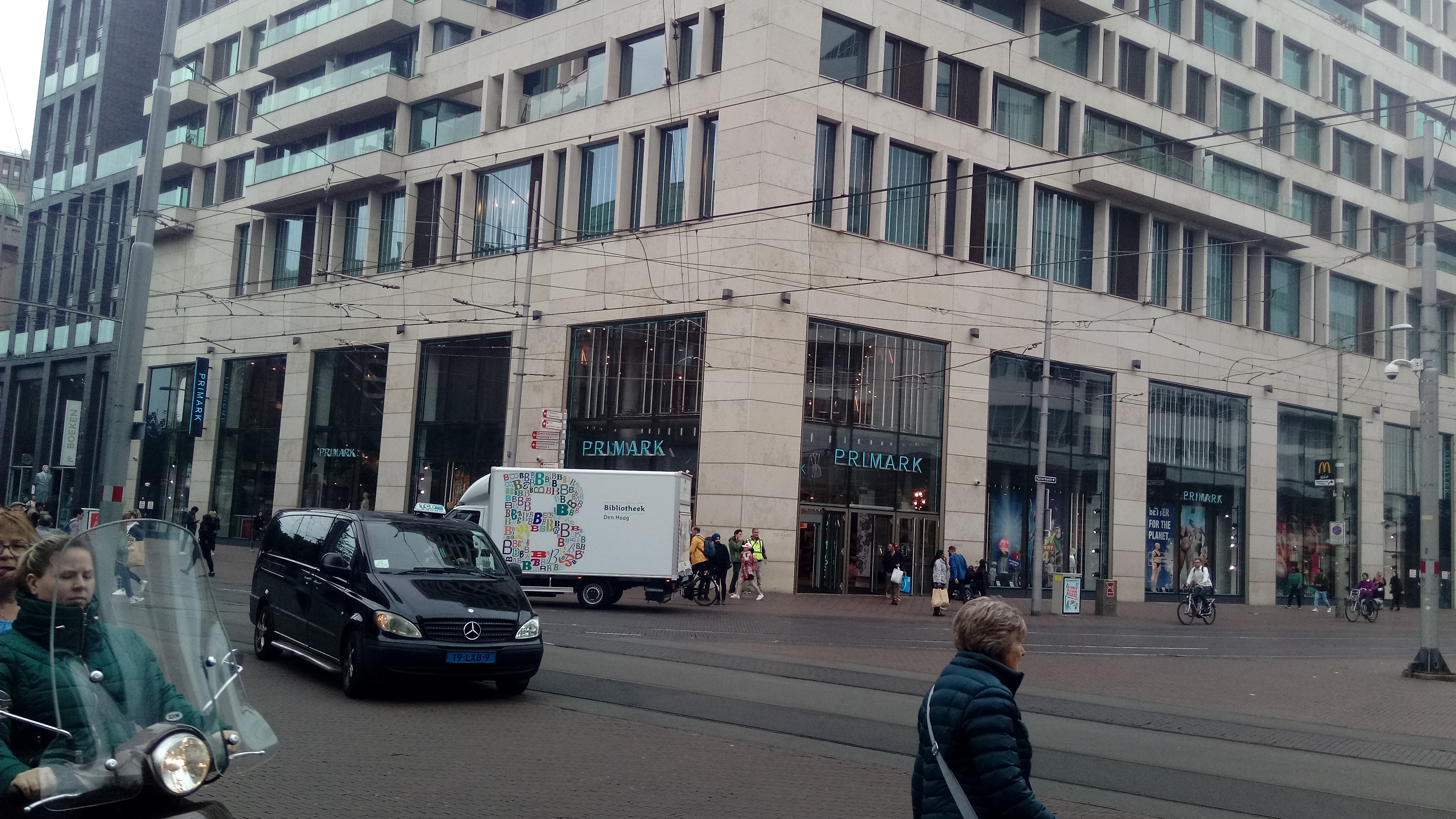
Primark in The Hague, Netherlands

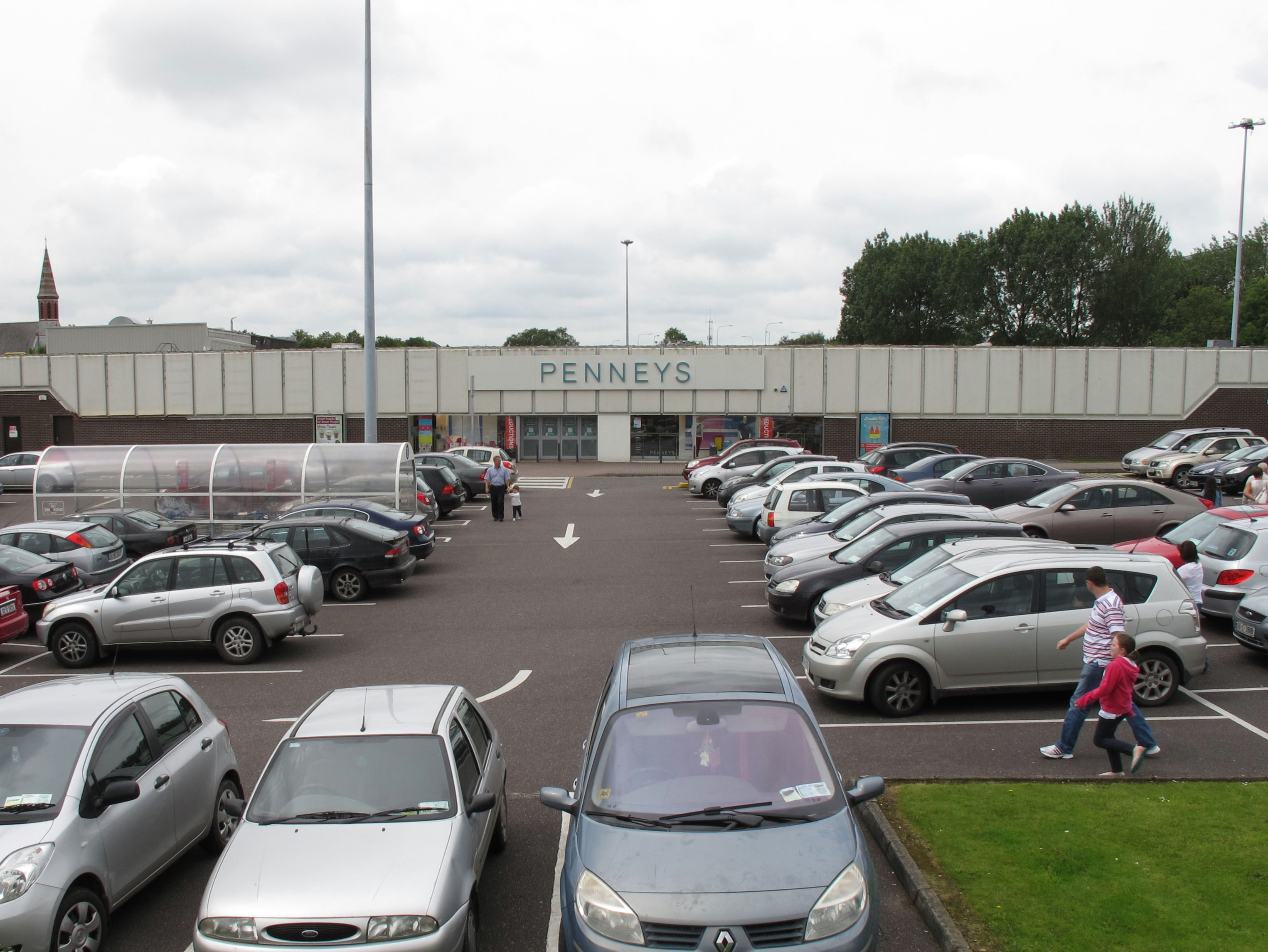
Penneys in the Wilton area of Cork, Ireland

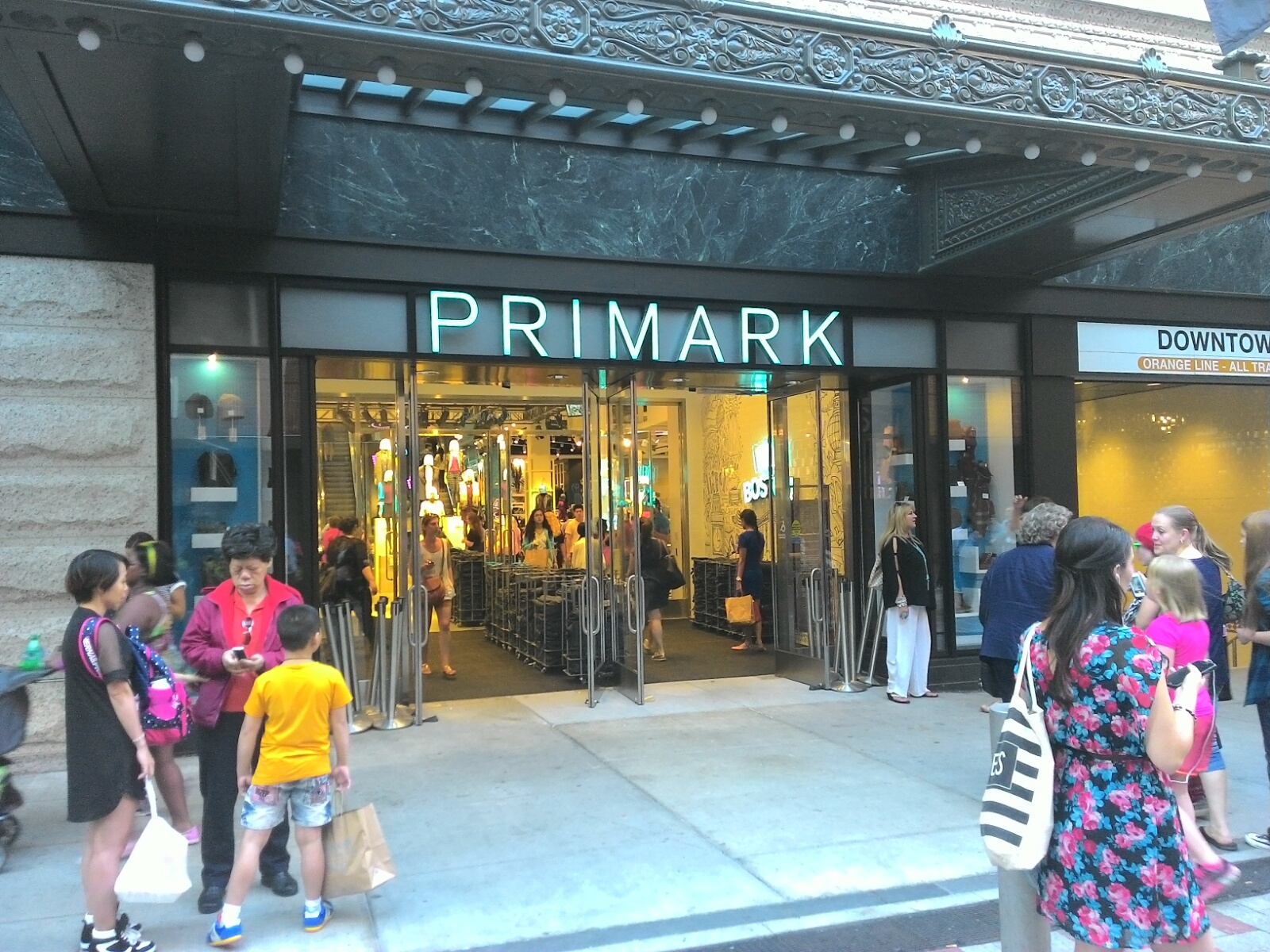
Primark in the Downtown Crossing area of Boston, Massachusetts, U.S.

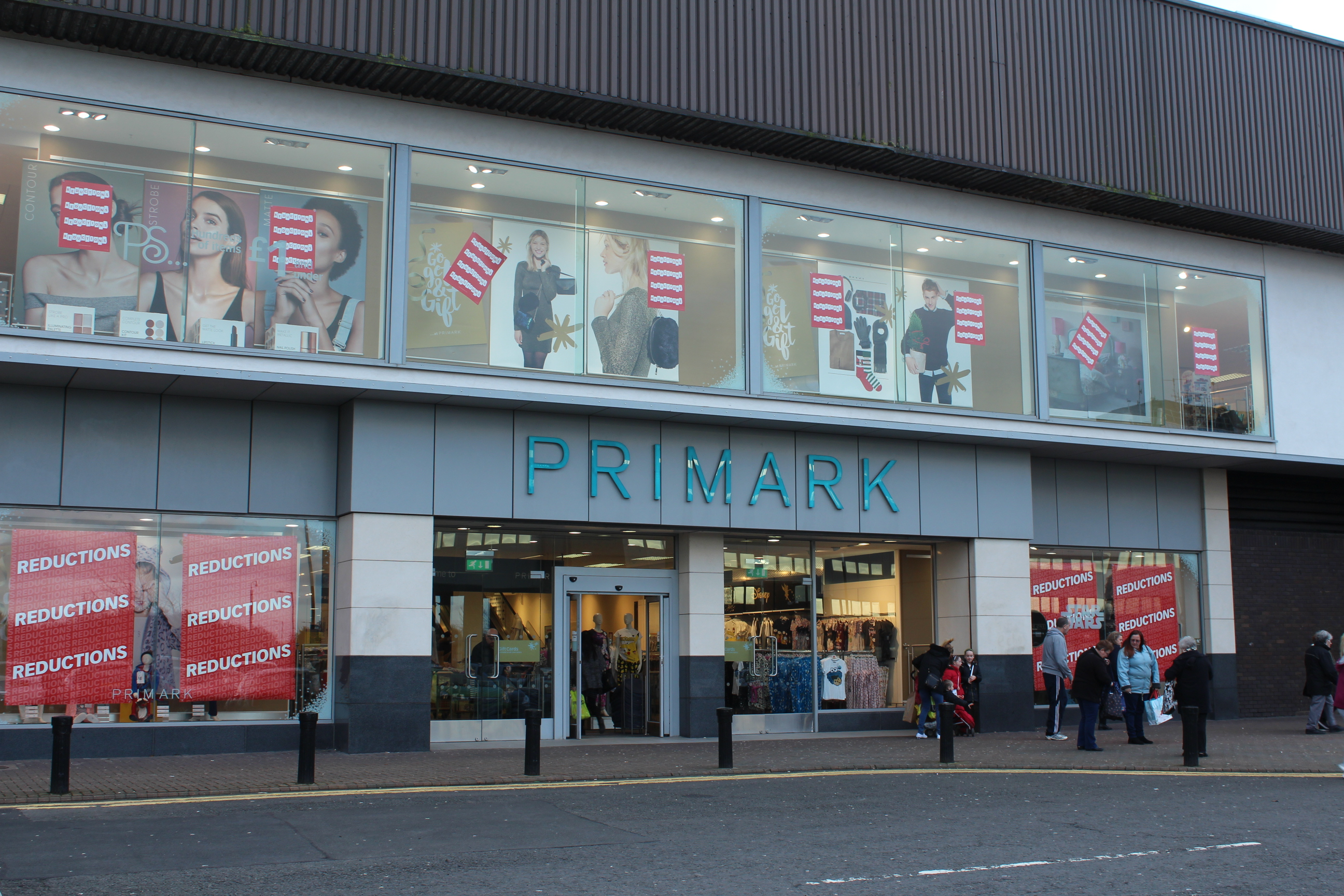
Primark in Irvine, North Ayrshire, Scotland.

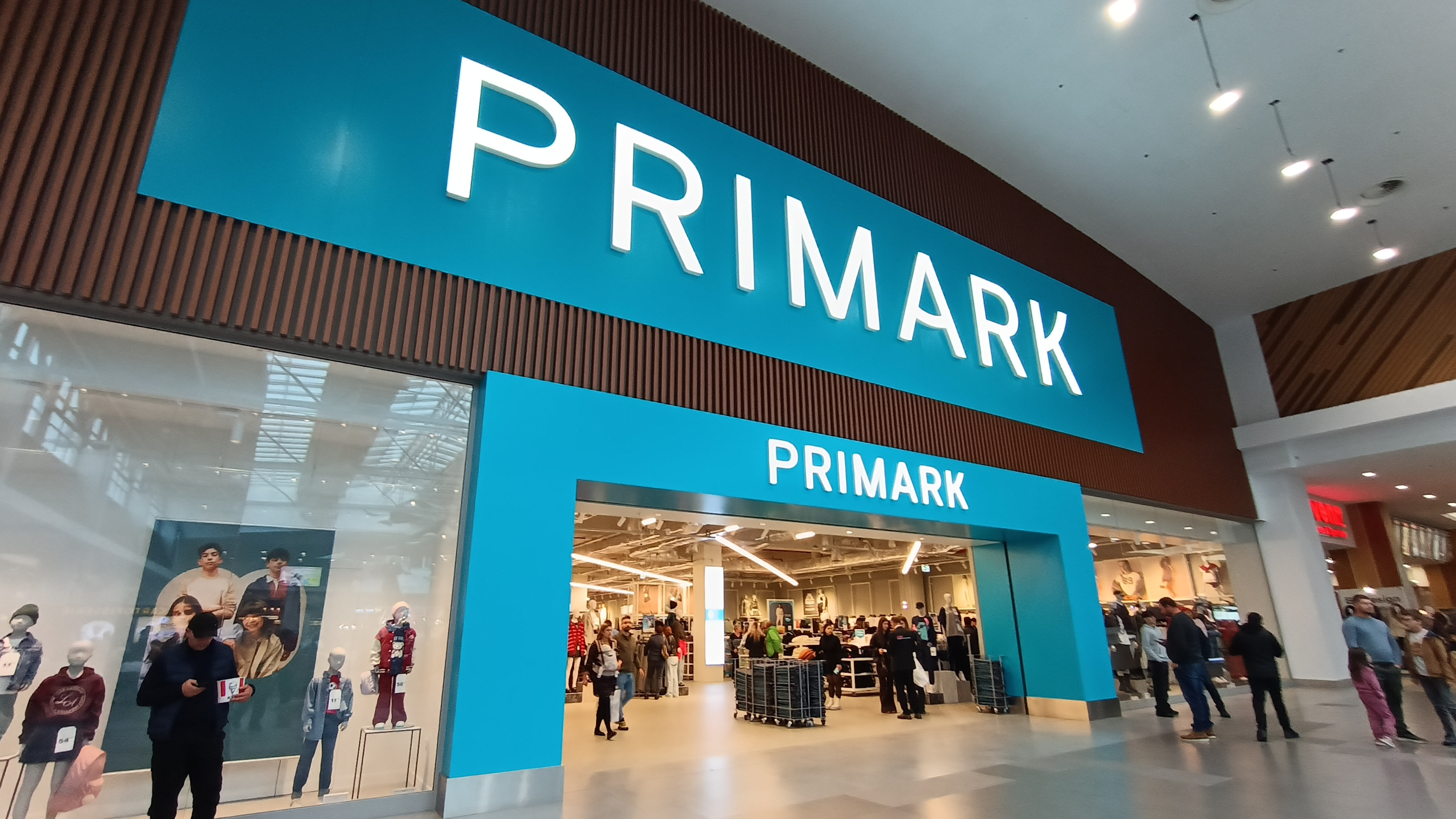
Primark in Cluj Napoca, Romania
