= Paul Bloomfield (philosopher) =

American philosopher

Education
- Education: Syracuse University (PhD), Tufts University (BA)

Philosophical work
- Era: 21st-century philosophy
- Region: Western philosophy
- Institutions: University of Connecticut
- Main interests: ethics

Paul Bloomfield is an American philosopher and Professor at the University of Connecticut. He is known for his works on moral realism.

== Books ==
- The Virtues of Happiness: A Theory of the Good Life, Oxford University Press, 2014, ISBN 9780199827367
- Moral Reality, Oxford University Press, 2001, ISBN 0-19-513713-2
- The Oxford Handbook of Moral Realism, edited with David Copp, Oxford University Press, 2023
- Morality and Self Interest (ed.), Oxford University Press, New York 2008
