= Don Richardson (businessman) =

British businessman (1930 – 2007)

- Born: Donald Richardson; 1930; Brierley Hill, Staffordshire, England
- Died: 6 September 2007 (aged 77); Cotswolds, England
- Occupation: Businessman
- Years active: 1940s–2007
- Known for: Founder, Merry Hill Shopping Centre
- Spouse: Ann (until 2007, his death)

Donald "Don" Richardson (1930 – 6 September 2007) was a British businessman who specialised in commercial development in conjunction with his twin brother Roy Richardson. They were joint owners of the Richardson Developments partnership, which was set up in the early 1980s in response to the government's new enterprise zones to bring jobs to areas suffering from high unemployment due to de-industrialisation.

Richardson is most famous for developing the Merry Hill Shopping Centre in Brierley Hill, West Midlands, England. He was born just a few streets away from the Round Oak Steel Works that once occupied part of the huge Merry Hill site, and when the steel works closed in December 1982 (with the loss of more than 1,000 jobs), the Richardson brothers set about revamping the site.

By 1985, barely two years after the closure of Round Oak, the Richardsons had already constructed the first two phases of the Merry Hill development - part of an enterprise zone that would be free of rates for 10 years under government initiatives to regenerate areas plagued with high levels of unemployment due to a decline in the manufacturing industry.

By 1989, the Richardsons had created one of Europe's largest shopping centres, which also incorporated fast food outlets, a cinema and a petrol station. They officially opened the final phase of the complex on 14 November 1989.

Richardson died of cancer in September 2007 at the age of 77. He was survived by his wife Ann and his brother Roy.
