= Tony Clegg (businessman) =

British businessperson (1937–1995)

Tony Clegg (8 April 1937 – 1 June 1995) was a British property entrepreneur whose company, Mountleigh, was a stock market favourite in the 1980s.

== See also ==
- Paul Bloomfield
