= Jan Bonde Nielsen =

Danish oil tycoon (born 1938)

Jan Bonde Nielsen (born 20 May 1938), known also by his nickname JBN, is a Danish billionaire and oil tycoon.

Bonde Nielsen found initial success in the floriculture industry through his Kenyan company, DCK International. In collaboration with the Danish government's Industrialization Fund for Developing Countries, he went on to employ over 7,000 people, operating on five million square metres of land.

Between 1974 and 1980, Bonde Nielsen was a member of the Executive Board and later President and CEO and Vice Chairman and Chairman of the Board of Directors of Burmeister & Wain. He moved to London in 1981 after filing for bankruptcy.

In 1982, in the so-called "Bonde Nielsen case", Bonde Nielsen, who was then residing in the United Kingdom, was indicted for a fraud in connection with the transfer of shares. In 1986, he was acquitted by the Copenhagen City Court, but the prosecution appealed the case. Due to Bonde Nielsen's absence and, according to English criminal law, he could not be extradited, the Østre Landsret had to postpone the case.

== See also ==
- De Danske Bomuldsspinderier
- Paul Bloomfield
- Saif Durbar
- Timur Kulibayev
