= Mountleigh =

Mountleigh was a property development and dealing company formerly listed on the London Stock Exchange. The company grew from a small textiles company to be one of the largest property trading companies in Britain under the chairmanship of Tony Clegg before being sold after the 1990s property crash.
